= George W. Clarke (Iowa politician) =

American politician (1852–1936)

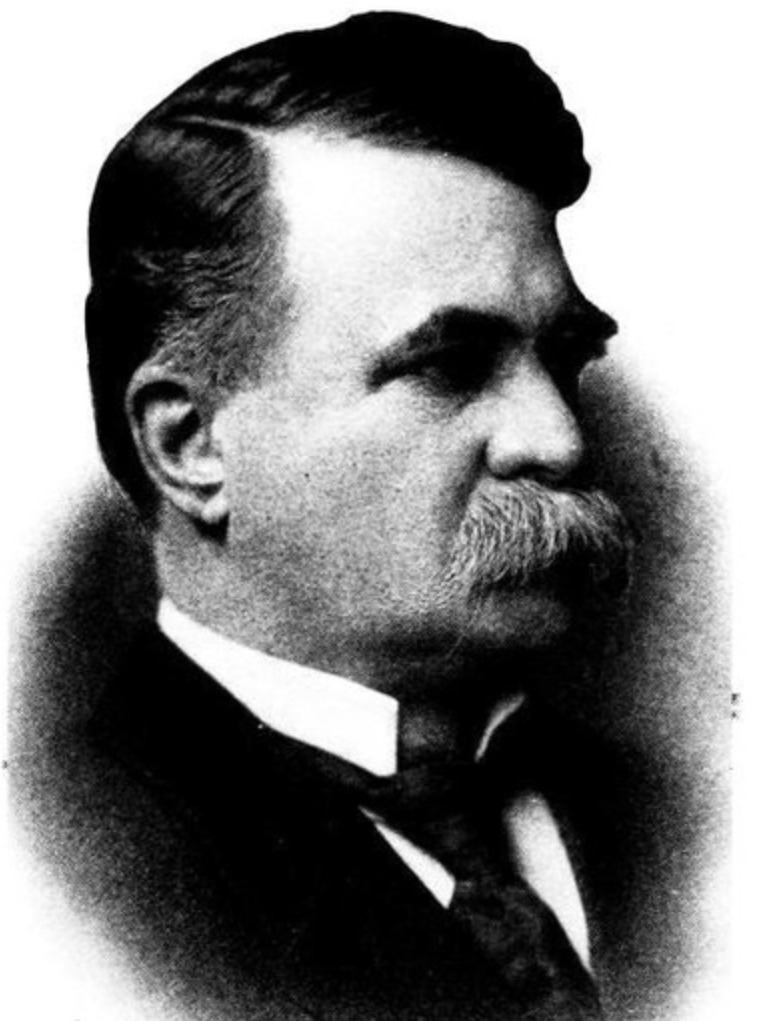

21st Governor of Iowa
- In office January 16, 1913 – January 11, 1917
- Lieutenant: William L. Harding
- Preceded by: Beryl F. Carroll
- Succeeded by: William L. Harding

21st Lieutenant Governor of Iowa
- In office January 14, 1909 – January 16, 1913
- Governor: Beryl F. Carroll
- Preceded by: Warren Garst
- Succeeded by: William L. Harding

Speaker of the Iowa House of Representatives
- In office 1904–1906

Member of the Iowa House of Representatives
- In office 1900–1906

Personal details
- Born: October 24, 1852 Shelby County, Indiana, U.S.
- Died: November 28, 1936 (aged 84) Adel, Iowa, U.S.
- Resting place: Oakdale Cemetery
- Party: Republican
- Spouse: Arletta Greene (m. 1878)
- Children: 4
- Relatives: Nile Kinnick (grandson)
- Education: Oskaloosa College (AB); University of Iowa College of Law (JD)
- Profession: Politician and Lawyer

George Washington Clarke (October 24, 1852 – November 28, 1936) was an American politician who served two terms as the 21st governor of Iowa from 1913 to 1917.

== Early life ==
George Washington Clarke was born on October 24, 1852, in Shelby County, Indiana, to Jane Eliza (née Akers) and John Clarke. In October 1856, the family moved to Drakesville, Iowa. He taught school in Drakesville and Bloomfield, Iowa.

From 1874 to 1877, he attended and graduated from Oskaloosa College with a Bachelor of Arts. He graduated from the University of Iowa College of Law in 1878, was admitted to the bar, and moved to Adel, Iowa. In 1895, he established a farm near Adel.

== Career ==
Clarke served four years as justice of the peace and in 1882 formed a law partnership with John B. White. He was a Republican.

He served in the Iowa House of Representatives from 1901 to 1909 and was speaker of the house for two terms from 1904 to 1909. He was chair of the judiciary committee. He was lieutenant governor for two terms from 1909 to 1913.

In 1912, he defeated Bull Moose Party candidate John L. Stevens for Governor of Iowa. He served from 1913 to 1917. During his tenure, he pushed for a US$2,285,000 beautification project of the Iowa State Capitol grounds. The grounds were expanded from four blocks to 93 acres (38 ha). He advocated for better roads and workmen's compensation laws.

== Later life ==
Clarke was dean of Drake University Law School for one year. He was manager for the campaign of Albert B. Cummins in 1926, which Cummins loss during the primary and then subsequently died a month later. He returned to practicing law in Adel, Iowa. His papers are in the collection of the University of Iowa.

== Personal life ==
Clarke married Arletta Greene on June 23, 1878. He had two sons and two daughters, including Fred, Charles and Frances. Arletta's father was Benjamin Greene, a member of the Iowa House of Representatives from 1852 to 1854 (4th General Assembly) and 1856 to 1858 (6th General Assembly).

He had an extensive book collection and library. His grandson Nile Kinnick, won the Heisman Trophy while playing for the University of Iowa, died during World War II and is the namesake for Kinnick Stadium at the University of Iowa.

Clarke died on November 28, 1936, at his home in Adel and was buried in Oakdale Cemetery.

Party political offices
Preceded by Beryl F. Carroll	Republican nominee Governor of Iowa; 1912, 1914	Succeeded by William L. Harding
Political offices
Preceded by Warren Garst	Lieutenant Governor of Iowa; 1909–1913	Succeeded by William L. Harding
Preceded by Beryl F. Carroll	Governor of Iowa; 1913–1917	Succeeded by William L. Harding
