= Joseph Eiboeck =

German-American newspaper editor (1838–1913)

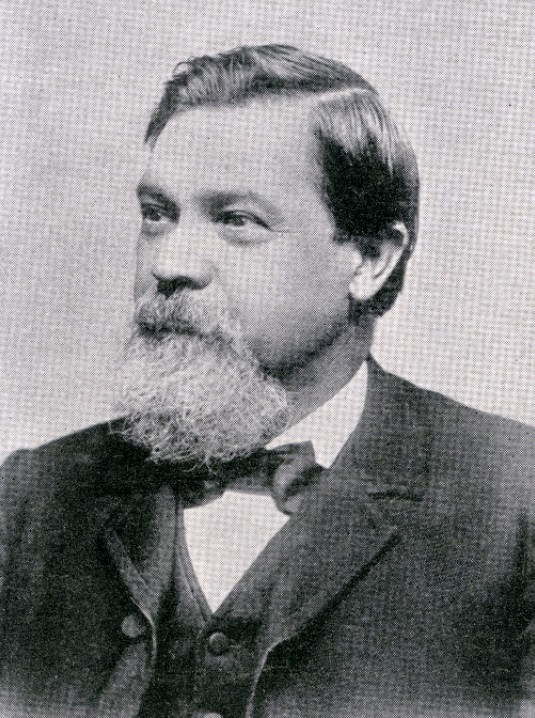
- Born: February 23, 1838; Breitenbrunn (Szeleskut), Hungary
- Died: January 8, 1913 (aged 74); Des Moines, Iowa, US
- Occupations: Newspaper editor and publisher Political campaigner
- Known for: Iowa Staats-Anzeiger; Anti-Prohibition activism
- Notable work: The Germans of Iowa and Their Achievements
- Political party: Democratic Party of Iowa

Joseph Eiboeck (February 23, 1838 – January 8, 1913) was an American newspaper editor, publisher, and author, who emigrated from the Austrian Empire to the United States. Known as "Colonel Eiboeck", he was one of the most prominent newspaper editors in late 19th- and early 20th-century Iowa, writing in both German and English, and an influential opponent of Prohibition. For nearly 40 years, he edited the Iowa Staats-Anzeiger, a Des Moines newspaper focusing on state politics and advocating "personal liberty", the motto of anti-Prohibitionists. Although Eiboeck himself did not drink alcohol, he believed in individual choice over regulation, and campaigned fervently against anti-saloon legislation, representing "the extreme views of the liquor interests in Iowa politics" according to The New York Times.

Prior to taking the helm at Staats-Anzeiger, he was editor and publisher of the Clayton County Journal for 13 years, and founder of the Elkader Nord Iowa Herold. In 1900, Eiboeck published The Germans of Iowa and Their Achievements, the first book focusing on the history of German, Swiss, and Austrian settlers across the state. English translations of chapters from his book are now available through the University of Iowa and the State Historical Society of Iowa.

== Early life and education ==
Eiboeck was born on February 23, 1838, in Breitenbrunn (Szeleskut), then part of Hungary, (Note: According to Britannica, "After World War I the predominantly German parts of western Hungary were ceded to Austria and became Burgenland". ("Burgenland", Britannica. Retrieved May 9, 2022.)) to Joseph and Marie Eiboeck. After his father was killed in a duel, he moved to Vienna, Austria, where he was educated in Latin. His stepfather, Paul Kiene, participated in the German revolutions of 1848–1849. Eiboeck later claimed that he developed "a love of liberty and equality" and hatred of all forms of oppression while witnessing the uprisings in front of their home in Vienna. Forced into exile, his family arrived in Dubuque, Iowa, on May 1, 1849, two and a half years after Iowa had become a state.

=== Apprenticeship and teaching ===
At the age of eleven, Eiboeck became a printer's devil at the first German-language newspaper in Iowa, then known as Der nordwestliche Demokrat. There, he worked with editor Anton Eickhoff, who later became editor-in-chief at the New Yorker Staats-Zeitung. Eiboeck completed his typesetting apprenticeship at the Miners' Express, then a daily newspaper in Dubuque, under Colonel William H. Merritt and William Ashley Jones, and continued working with Merritt when the Miners' Express merged with the Dubuque Herald. During his years as an apprentice and journeyman, he studied English in his free time, and passed an examination to become a teacher. He started giving writing lessons at the age of 18, and became a public school teacher the following year. It was his first time setting foot in an American classroom.

== Publishing career ==
In the spring of 1855, Eiboeck moved to Garnavillo, Iowa. He worked for a time at the Clayton County Journal, the first newspaper north of Dubuque. He then "drifted" to Elkader, where he worked at the Elkader Tribune, founded by Frank Belfay. According to Eiboeck, Belfay's frequent absences from the office allowed him to gain his first "real" newspaper experience, although he had been writing for various newspapers for a year or more. While at the Elkader Tribune, he covered the very first meeting of the Anti-Nebraska Party in northern Iowa, which would later become the Republican Party.

In the spring of 1859, he went back to Garnavillo on a lecture tour. A few months later, he bought the Clayton County Journal for $300, and in 1860, he moved it to Elkader, Iowa, when it became the county seat. In 1868, Eiboeck founded the German weekly paper Elkader Nord Iowa Herold, which he sold six months later. He was based in Clayton County, publishing and editing Clayton County Journal, for 13 years.

In August 1872, Eiboeck sold his interest in the newspaper, so that he could complete his first book, History of Clayton County and North Iowa, which he had been writing for some time. He then traveled extensively to gather information and improve his health, throughout the United States, its territories, the Pacific Coast, and northern Mexico. In 1873, he went to the World's Fair in Vienna as an honorary commissioner from Iowa, and visited major cities throughout Europe, sharing his experience in lectures upon his return to America. Twenty years later, Eiboeck was honored once again, as a commissioner from Iowa for the 1893 World's Columbian Exposition in Chicago, where he gave a speech that was "cabled to Paris and London".

=== Iowa Staats-Anzeiger ===
In February 1874, Joseph Eiboeck moved to Des Moines and bought the Iowa Staats-Anzeiger, taking over as both editor and publisher. Over the next 39 years, he established Iowa Staats-Anzeiger as one of the leading German newspapers in what was then the northwestern United States. Eiboeck shifted the paper's focus to state politics, positioning the Iowa Staats-Anzeiger as a staunch advocate and defender of civil liberties, and an opponent of the temperance movement. He introduced front-page editorials written in English – a format that proved very popular with readers – under the column header "The State Anzeiger: Personal Liberty Organ".

By 1895, the paper's circulation had reached 6,400 households throughout the state. Although its readership was mainly German-speaking Iowans, the paper's "English Department" was also read by state legislators, and became "the leading forum for the exchange of anti-Prohibition information and strategies in Iowa". While running the Iowa Staats-Anzeiger, Eiboeck also published two English-language publications in Des Moines dedicated to the anti-Prohibition cause: Herald of Liberty, followed by the State Independent. As of 1892, he also had two German-language journals: Haus-Schatz and Sonntags-Post.

== Political campaigns ==
=== Democratic Party ===
Eiboeck initially joined the early Liberal Republican movement in Iowa. In May 1872, he served as a delegate to the Liberal Republican convention in Cincinnati, which nominated newspaper editor and publisher Horace Greeley for president. Later that year, he became a lifelong member of the Iowa Democratic Party, although he and other German Iowans briefly "flirted" with the Anti-Monopoly Party in 1874. In 1878, Eiboeck was the Democratic candidate for the Iowa State Auditor, but narrowly lost the election to Republican Buren R. Sherman, who went on to become Governor of Iowa. For over a quarter century, Eiboeck went on annual lecture tours across Iowa and other states including Nebraska, Ohio, Illinois, Indiana, Wisconsin, Minnesota, and South Dakota, to campaign on behalf of the Democratic Party.

=== Anti-Prohibition movement ===
As the Republican Party of Iowa became increasingly tied to Prohibition and anti-immigrant sentiment, German American men across the state, united against Prohibition, emerged as an influential voting bloc. Eiboeck sought to use his visibility and reach to capitalize on the ability of German American voters to sway elections. In May 1879, the Iowa State Register, a pro-Prohibition newspaper, credited Eiboeck and the Iowa Staats-Anzeiger for defeating Des Moines Prohibitionists in a municipal referendum calling for anti-saloon legislation. By the 1880s, Eiboeck's reputation extended well beyond Iowa. In 1885, The New York Times said that Colonel Eiboeck "represents the extreme views of the liquor interests in Iowa politics" in an article appearing on the newspaper's front page.

In July 1879, Eiboeck was a co-founder of the "State Protective Association" in Des Moines, which brought together saloon keepers, brewers, and liquor dealers, to lobby for a "judicious license law" and educate voters about the economic losses incurred by farmers and businesses as a result of existing laws prohibiting liquor. Eiboeck helped to forge alliances between the Germans and Irish anti-Prohibitionists, by working to overcome the resentment felt by many Irish Iowans, whose whiskey was technically illegal, toward German Iowans, who were still allowed to brew beer. In 1881, Eiboeck was one of three Polk County delegates to a state-wide convention for the organization of an Iowan State Anti-Prohibition Club. The convention resolved to defeat a proposed statewide referendum on Prohibition, and elected Eiboeck to the club's executive committee as a representative from Iowa's 7th congressional district.

In 1885, Eiboeck caused the Greenback Party to scramble, after interviewing Greenback Congressman James B. Weaver about the party's candidate for Lieutenant Governor, E. H. Gillette. Weaver, thinking that an interview with Iowa Staats-Anzeiger would only be read by German speakers, promised that if elected, Gillette would reverse his Prohibitionist views and "convene an anti-Prohibition committee in the state senate". Iowa Republicans promptly circulated translations of Weaver's Staats-Anzeiger interview, causing him to retract his statements, claiming that Eiboeck had misunderstood him. The incident nearly scuppered plans for a combined ticket, putting forward a Democrat for governor and a Greenback for lieutenant governor in the gubernatorial election, which was won in the end by Republican William Larrabee.

In 1910, Eiboeck became the founding president of the German-American Alliance of Iowa, known as the Deutsch-Amerikanischer Liberaler Staatsverband von Iowa (German-American Liberal State Association of Iowa). With 16,000 members, the statewide organization used its considerable reach to lobby against Republican efforts to introduce a Prohibition amendment to the Iowa state constitution.

=== The Germans of Iowa and Their Achievements ===
Joseph Eiboeck published The Germans of Iowa and Their Achievements, his "800-page magnum opus", in 1900. Written in German, Die Deutschen von Iowa und deren Errungenschaften was the only book of its kind, dedicated to the history of German, Austrian, and Swiss immigrants to Iowa. Popular chapters within his book include Chapter 8, "German Iowans in the Union Army", Chapter 22, "German Settlements", and Chapter 11, "Iowa's Prohibition Plague". In "Iowa's Prohibition Plague", Eiboeck provides a detailed account of the battles over Prohibition in the 1880s, including the defeat of a Prohibition amendment to the state constitution in 1882, and the subsequent Prohibition Act that went into effect in 1884. Eiboeck describes the period from July 4, 1884 to 1890 as "a reign of terror for Iowa", during which the consumption and production of alcoholic beverages in Iowa was made illegal, and efforts to enforce and resist the law often ended in violence.

== Personal life ==
From November 1861 to January 1862, Eiboeck served briefly in the Union Army during the American Civil War. Along with other volunteers from Clayton County, he enlisted in Company E of the 9th Iowa Infantry Regiment, but was discharged at Pacific, Missouri, due to disability.

On June 15, 1862, Joseph Eiboeck married Fannie Garrison, who was originally from Detroit, Michigan. They had six children, including a son who died at the age of five. Their daughter Marie "Minnie" Eiboeck married Silas C. McFarland, the editor and publisher of The Marshalltown Times, who entered the United States Consular Service, and served in posts in Nottingham, England; Reichenberg; and St. Gall, Switzerland.

For many years, Eiboeck served as president, then honorary president, of the German-American Press Association of the West. In addition, Eiboeck belonged to the Des Moines Turners; the German Jonathan Lodge No. 137 I.O.O.F. (Independent Order of Odd Fellows); and the German Men's Choir. He was a Freemason and a Knight Templar.

== Death and legacy ==
Joseph Eiboeck died on January 8, 1913, in Des Moines, Iowa due to complications from pneumonia, followed a few days later by his wife, Fannie. They were both buried at Woodland Cemetery, and survived by Minnie McFarland and one granddaughter.

In 1916, The Germans of Iowa and Their Achievements was listed in Rudolf Cronau's German Achievements in America, as one of several comprehensive histories of German immigrants at the state level. Writing during World War I, Cronau suggested that collectively, these and other works would help to provide "a solid wall against present-day efforts to minimize the German as a factor in America." Five years after Eiboeck's death, the Babel Proclamation was signed into law by Iowa Governor William Harding, prohibiting the use of foreign languages in public. The executive order marked the end of the foreign-language press in Iowa.

Since 2014, the University of Iowa and the University of Münster have collaborated in transcribing and translating chapters of The Germans of Iowa and Their Achievements, which was originally printed in a German blackletter typeface (Fraktur). In 2019, an annotated English translation of Joseph Eiboeck's "Iowa's Prohibition Plague" (Chapter 11) was published in its entirety in The Annals of Iowa.
