= 1912 Iowa gubernatorial election =

- November 5, 1912
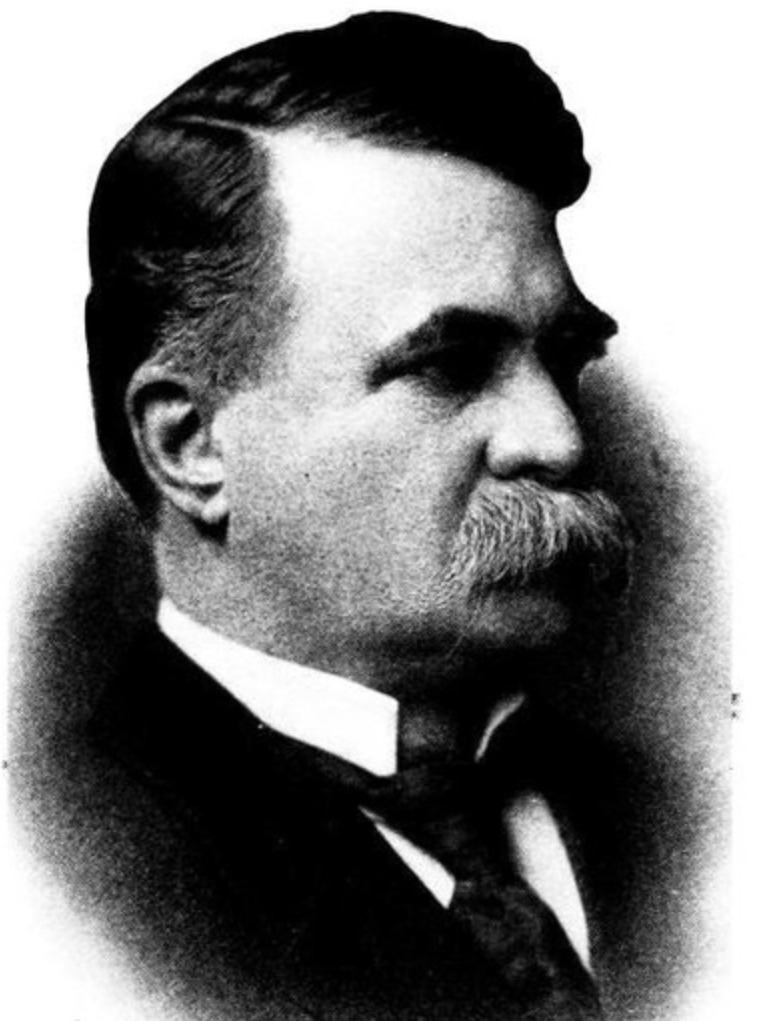

| Nominee | George W. Clarke | Edward G. Dunn | John L. Stevens |
| Party | Republican | Democratic | Progressive |
| Popular vote | 184,150 | 182,449 | 71,879 |
| Percentage | 39.93% | 39.56% | 15.59% |
- County results Clarke: 30–40% 40–50% 50–60% 60–70% Dunn: 30–40% 40–50% 50–60% 60–70%
Governor before election
Beryl F. Carroll
Republican
Elected Governor
George W. Clarke
Republican

The 1912 Iowa gubernatorial election was held on November 5, 1912. Republican nominee George W. Clarke defeated Democratic nominee Edward G. Dunn with 39.93% of the vote.

== Primary elections ==
Primary elections were held on June 3, 1912.

=== Democratic primary ===
==== Candidates ====
- Edward G. Dunn
- John Taylor Hamilton, former U.S. Representative

==== Results ====
Democratic primary results
| Party | Candidate | Votes | % |
|---|---|---|---|
| Democratic | Edward G. Dunn | 31,965 | 55.72 |
| Democratic | John Taylor Hamilton | 25,405 | 44.28 |
| Total votes | | 57,370 | 100.00 |

=== Republican primary ===
==== Candidates ====
- George W. Clarke, incumbent Lieutenant Governor
- Perry Greeley Holden, Iowa State University professor
- A. V. Proudfoot

==== Results ====
Republican primary results
| Party | Candidate | Votes | % |
|---|---|---|---|
| Republican | George W. Clarke | 89,107 | 49.17 |
| Republican | Perry Greeley Holden | 68,801 | 37.97 |
| Republican | A. V. Proudfoot | 23,311 | 12.86 |
| Total votes | | 181,219 | 100.00 |

== General election ==
=== Candidates ===
Major party candidates

- George W. Clarke, Republican
- Edward G. Dunn, Democratic

Other candidates

- John L. Stevens, Progressive
- I. S. McCrillis, Socialist
- C. Durant Jones, Prohibition

=== Results ===
1912 Iowa gubernatorial election
| Party | Candidate | Votes | % | ±% |
|---|---|---|---|---|
| Republican | George W. Clarke | 184,150 | 39.93% | |
| Democratic | Edward G. Dunn | 182,449 | 39.56% | |
| Progressive | John L. Stevens | 71,879 | 15.59% | |
| Socialist | I. S. McCrillis | 14,986 | 3.25% | |
| Prohibition | C. Durant Jones | 7,746 | 1.68% | |
| Majority | | 1,701 | | |
| Turnout | | | | |
| Republican hold | | Swing | | |
