= Logan Park =

Logan Park may refer to:

- Logan Park (Fresno), a residential park in Fresno, California
- Logan Park (Santa Ana) a neighborhood in Santa Ana, California
- Logan Park, Minneapolis a neighborhood in Minneapolis, Minnesota
- Logan Park, Dunedin a sports venue in New Zealand
- Logan Park High School, in Dunedin, New Zealand
- Logan Park Cemetery (Sioux City), located in Iowa
