= Claude R. Porter =

American politician

Claude Rodman Porter
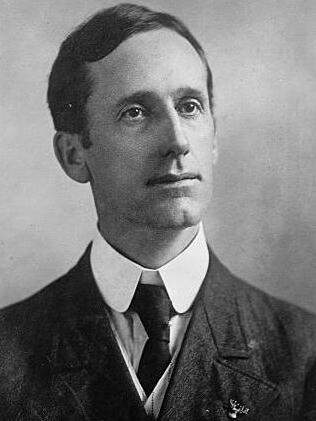
- Porter in 1910

Member of the Iowa Senate from the 3rd district
- In office January 8, 1900 – January 10, 1904
- Preceded by: Beryl F. Carroll
- Succeeded by: Lewis Leroy Taylor

Member of the Iowa House of Representatives from the 4th district
- In office 1896–1900
- Preceded by: George W. Wyckoff
- Succeeded by: Frank Smith Payne

Personal details
- Born: July 8, 1872 Moulton, Iowa, U.S.
- Died: August 17, 1946 (aged 74) Washington, D.C., U.S.
- Party: Democratic
- Education: Parsons College; Washington University in St. Louis
- Occupation: Attorney

Claude Rodman Porter (July 8, 1872 – August 17, 1946) was an American politician and lawyer. He served in both chambers of the Iowa General Assembly and as a United States Attorney, and was a perennial Democratic Party runner-up to Republican victors in three races for governor of Iowa and six races for U.S. senator. In an era in which the Republican Party was so dominant in Iowa that Senator Jonathan P. Dolliver remarked that "Iowa will go Democratic when Hell goes Methodist," Porter twice came closer to winning the governorship than all but one other Democratic candidate of that era. He later served as a member of the U.S. Interstate Commerce Commission for eighteen years.

== Background ==
Porter was born to attorney George D. Porter and Hannah (Rodman) Porter in Moulton, Iowa, in Appanoose County. He was educated at Parsons College in Fairfield, Iowa, and St. Louis Law School (now Washington University School of Law) in St. Louis.

== Service in the legislature and military ==
After becoming admitted to the bar in 1893 and beginning to serve as a lawyer in Centerville, Iowa, he was elected in 1895, at age twenty-three, to the Iowa House of Representatives as a "fusion candidate" with Democratic Party and Populist Party support. The youngest member of the House, Porter served two terms (from 1896 to 1900).

In 1898, while a state representative, he served in the United States Army with the 51st Iowa Volunteer Infantry Regiment during the Spanish–American War and early stages of the Philippine–American War. While in the service, he also ran unsuccessfully for the Democratic nomination for the United States House of Representatives in Iowa's 8th congressional district, and for Secretary of State of Iowa. In 1899, he married Maude Boutin, and was elected to the Iowa Senate from Iowa's 3rd Senate district, where he served from 1900 to 1904. In 1900, 1902, 1904, and 1906, he refused requests to run again for Congress in the 8th district, concluding each time that incumbent Republican Congressman William P. Hepburn could not be defeated.

== Statewide elections, 1906–1911 ==
In 1906, Porter ran for governor of Iowa, winning the Democratic nomination, but losing to incumbent Republican Albert B. Cummins.

Because the term of U.S. Senator Dolliver would expire in March 1907, Dolliver was up for re-election by the General Assembly in January 1907. All but one of the Democrats in the General Assembly voted for Porter rather than Dolliver, but their numbers were far too few to prevent Dolliver's re-election.

In 1908, Iowa's other U.S. Senate seat was up, and a new state law provided for Senate nominees to be selected in a primary election. Porter won the Democratic nomination. Senator William B. Allison defeated Cummins in the Republican primary but died soon thereafter, and in a special convention Republicans chose Cummins to take Allison's place as Republican nominee. The Iowa General Assembly, which retained the power to choose U.S. senators from among the parties' nominees, twice selected Cummins over Porter, in a November 1908 vote (resolving who would serve the rest of Allison's original March 1903 – 1909 term) and a January 1909 vote (resolving who would serve the March 1909 – 1915 term).

In 1910, Porter ran for governor again, this time losing to incumbent Republican Beryl F. Carroll.

Porter tried again to become a U.S. Senator in 1911, when the entire contest was decided in the Iowa General Assembly without a primary due in part to Dolliver's death. Porter was the choice of the Democrats' minority caucus, and the Republicans' majority caucus divided their votes among multiple candidates, but at the end of the legislative session, on the 67th ballot, Republican William S. Kenyon finally achieved a large enough majority to win. In all, five times in five years, Porter was the Democrats' top choice for either Governor or U.S. Senator, but came away with nothing.

== Wartime prosecutor and candidate for governor ==
After Democrat Woodrow Wilson was elected president, Porter was nominated and confirmed as United States District Court for the Southern District of Iowa, where he served from 1914 to 1918. While serving as U.S. Attorney, he aggressively enforced the Espionage Act of 1917 against persons who spoke out against the draft or "assisted" others who did so, including the defendants in the 1917–18 Davenport sedition trial. He also served as first assistant special prosecutor in the Chicago trial of over one hundred members of the Industrial Workers of the World on similar charges. After a trial that lasted from April to August 1918, the jury deliberated briefly and returned convictions of all 100 remaining defendants, including IWW general secretary Big Bill Haywood. Soon after the trial was completed, Porter was promoted to Assistant Attorney General of the United States.

Porter continued to prosecute federal charges while running for Iowa governor in 1918. He received the Democratic nomination without opposition, and faced incumbent Republican William L. Harding in the general election. Despite Porter's attacks on Harding's patriotism, Harding prevailed, as part of an Iowa Republican sweep.

Porter continued to serve as an Assistant U.S. Attorney General until July 1919, when he became chief counsel for the Federal Trade Commission, serving in that position until October 1, 1920.

== Statewide elections, 1920–1926 ==
In November 1920, Porter again ran unsuccessfully for the United States Senate. Once again, he was the Democratic nominee against Cummins, who had served as a senator since defeating Porter in 1908.

Porter's chances for a victory in a statewide election were the greatest in 1926, when he again ran for the U.S. Senate, this time against insurgent Republican Smith W. Brookhart. Brookhart was fiercely opposed by many within his own party because of his anti-business, pro-labor views, and Brookhart's opposition to Republican President Calvin Coolidge, and had officially lost the 1924 race for Iowa's other Senate seat to Democrat Daniel Steck. However, Porter again lost in the general election. Porter never again ran for statewide office.

Porter also served as a delegate from Iowa to Democratic National Conventions in 1908, 1912, and 1924. He also served on the Iowa State Board of Education from 1925 until November 1928.

== Interstate Commerce Commission ==
In 1928, he was appointed by President Coolidge to the Interstate Commerce Commission in Washington, D.C. He served as a member of the Commission until his death on August 17, 1946, of a cerebral hemorrhage. He died the same day that his son, George B. Porter, was buried, following his accidental death five days earlier.

Party political offices
Preceded by J. B. Sullivan	Democratic nominee for Governor of Iowa; 1906	Succeeded by Frederick Edward White
Preceded by Frederick Edward White	Democratic nominee for Governor of Iowa; 1910	Succeeded by Edward G. Dunn
Preceded by Edwin T. Meredith	Democratic nominee for Governor of Iowa; 1918	Succeeded by Clyde L. Herring
Preceded by Maurice Connolly	Democratic nominee for U.S. Senator from Iowa (Class 3); 1920, 1926	Succeeded by Richard L. Murphy
