= Governor Harding =

Governor Harding may refer to:

- John Harding, 1st Baron Harding of Petherton (1896–1989), Governor of Cyprus from 1955 to 1957 officer
- William L. Harding (1877–1934), 22nd Governor of Iowa, from 1917 to 1921

== See also ==
- Governor Hardinge (disambiguation)
