= David W. Stewart =

American politician (1887–1974)

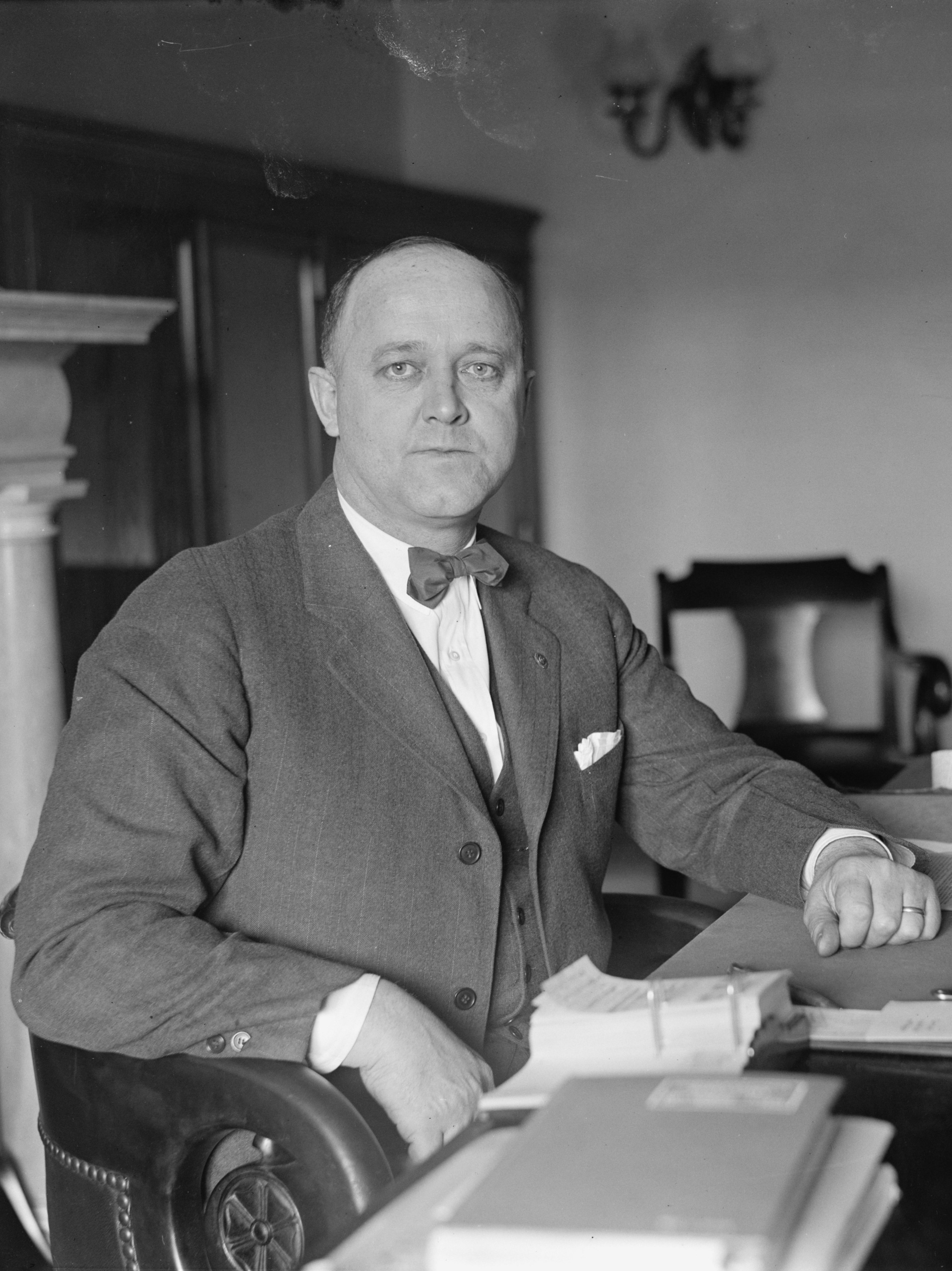
- Wallace in 1926

United States Senator from Iowa
- In office August 7, 1926 – March 3, 1927
- Preceded by: Albert B. Cummins
- Succeeded by: Smith W. Brookhart

Personal details
- Born: January 22, 1887 New Concord, Ohio
- Died: February 10, 1974 (aged 87) Sioux City, Iowa
- Party: Republican

David Wallace Stewart (January 22, 1887 – February 10, 1974) served as a United States senator from Iowa from August 7, 1926, until March 3, 1927, serving out the unexpired term of a senator who died soon after he was defeated for re-election in a Republican primary.

Born in New Concord, Ohio, Stewart attended public schools and graduated from Geneva College (in Beaver Falls, Pennsylvania) in 1911. He came to Iowa in 1911, to coach at Cherokee, Iowa, and then coached and taught high school classes in Sioux City, Iowa until 1914. He graduated from the University of Chicago Law School in 1917 where he was a member of the Delta Chi fraternity. Serving in the U.S. Marine Corps in the First World War under General Smedley D. Butler, he served overseas as a first sergeant in Company K of the 53rd Regiment. Returning to Sioux City after the war, he resumed the practice of law. He was president of that city's Chamber of Commerce in 1925.

In early 1926, Stewart became active in the campaign to re-elect longtime Iowa Republican Senator Albert B. Cummins. Starting in April 1926, Cummins received a challenge from an "insurgent" candidate, former U.S. Senator Smith W. Brookhart. That month, Brookhart's Senate colleagues had ousted him from Iowa's other U.S. Senate seat, in an election challenge to his apparent 1924 victory, prompting Brookhart to immediately run for Cummins's seat. Running on a populist, farm-relief agenda, Brookhart defeated Cummins in the primary in June 1926; the following month, Cummins unexpectedly died.

Only the Republicans chose to nominate a candidate in the November 1926 election to serve out the final four months in Cummins's unexpired term, because Democrats concentrated their efforts on an unsuccessful effort to defeat Brookhart's candidacy for the next full term. Stewart went to the Republican nominating convention expecting others to win, and finished a distant fifth on the first ballot, but anti-Brookhart delegates eventually aligned behind him, and he prevailed on the third ballot. That same day, Governor John Hammill appointed Stewart to fill Cummins's seat from August until the November election.

Stewart was elected November 2, 1926 and served until Cummins's unexpired term ended on March 3, 1927. Returning to Sioux City, he resumed the practice of law.

He was president of the board of trustees of Morningside College from 1938 to 1962.

Stewart died in Sioux City in 1974; his interment is in Logan Park Cemetery.

Party political offices
| Preceded by Albert B. Cummins | Republican nominee for U.S. Senator from Iowa (Class 3); 1926 | Succeeded by Smith W. Brookhart |
U.S. Senate
| Preceded by Albert B. Cummins | U.S. senator (Class 3) from Iowa; 1926 – 1927; Served alongside: Daniel F. Steck | Succeeded by Smith W. Brookhart |
