= Anton Lang =

German studio potter and actor

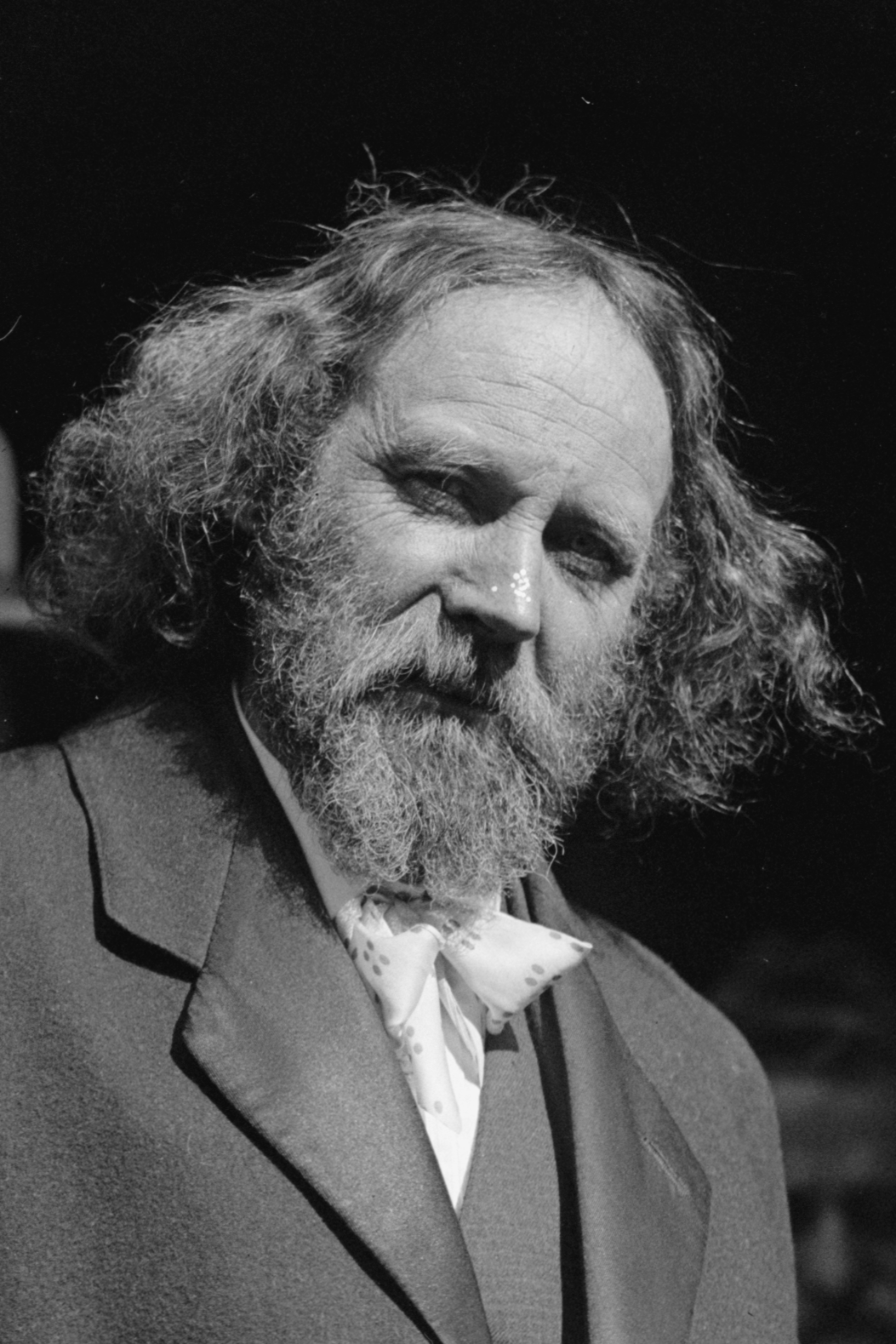
- Lang in 1924
- Born: January 17, 1875; Oberammergau, Kingdom of Bavaria, German Empire
- Died: May 30, 1938 (aged 63); Munich, Bavaria, Nazi Germany
- Occupations: actor, potter

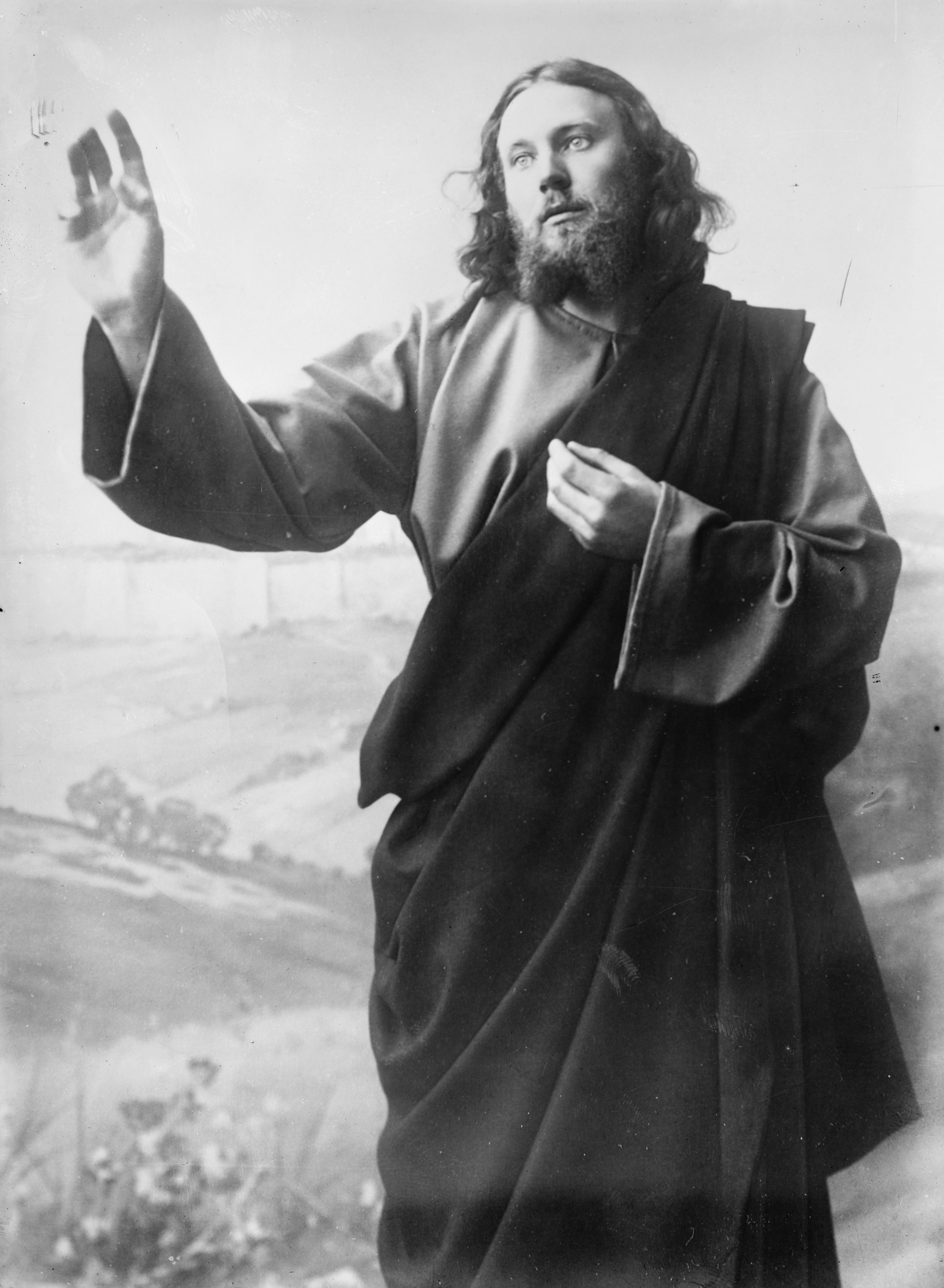
Anton Lang as Jesus in the Oberammergau Passion Play of 1900

Anton Lang (17 January 1875 – 30 May 1938) was a German studio potter and an actor in the Oberammergau Passion Play. He played the role of Jesus Christ in 1900, 1910, and 1922. He was the Prologue Speaker in 1930 and again in the Jubilee Production of 1934.

== Biography ==
Lang was born on January 17, 1875, in Oberammergau, Bavaria, Germany.

He played the role of Jesus Christ in the Oberammergau Passion Play in 1900, 1910, and 1922.

Lang died in Munich on May 30, 1938, at the age of 63, following surgery for a stomach ailment.

== Legacy ==
In 1923–1924, Lang visited the U.S. and was asked to comment on many of the current events of the day. When reporters told Lang of "religious clashes" in the United States, which then was witnessing fights between evolutionists and religious fundamentalists and the rebirth of the Ku Klux Klan and its anti-Catholic and antisemitic propaganda, and of "the organized manifestations of bigotry" he "seemed incredulous" and "shook his head deprecatingly." Lang commented that "At Oberammergau we have all kinds. There is a Catholic church, and a chapel that is used by the Protestants—Baptists, Methodists, Episcopalians, and all kinds. But that isn't what counts. It is how one lives that makes one good or bad; and Jesus, I believe, will take us all to heaven according to our virtues." "And the Jews?" a reporter asked. Lang smiled again, and replied: 'Yes, I think the Jews, too, will go to heaven.’"

In 1938, rumors reached England that Lang was in trouble with the Nazi authorities. He was a pacifist and also opposed Nazi attempts to add overtly antisemitic language to the Passion Play. Two English newspapers hired Elizabethe Corathiel to visit Lang. "He was exceedingly anxious to impress upon me the necessity of denying the rumours, pointing out that it might be very dangerous for him if they were allowed to persist." Two weeks later Lang was dead'. Corathiel was "convinced that the political trend at the time hastened his end." Almost the whole Oberammergau population attended Lang's funeral. "There were no tributes, however, from Nazi party or State authorities nor was there any Nazi uniform among the 1,200 mourners in the little churchyard."

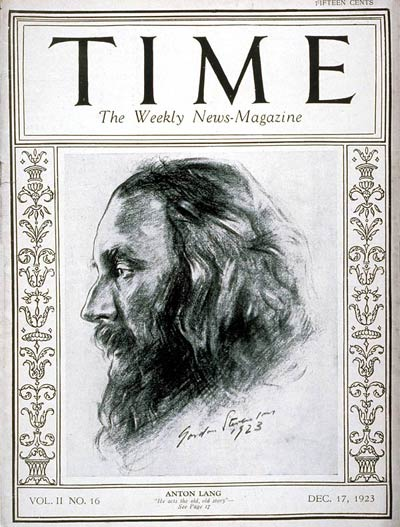
Time cover, 17 Dec 1923

Two of Lang's sons, Karl and Friedl, belonged to a Catholic Youth group that visited Rome in 1934. Friedl recalled: "On our way back to Germany, our buses were stopped at the border. The guards seized our cameras, our shirts and buckles, tents, banners etc, and took our names. After running the gauntlet of a bevy of abusing HJ [Hitler Youth] boys, we were allowed to proceed to Munich. There the police were already waiting for us. We were again arrested, and taken to the Police Headquarters where our passports were checked and our names registered. In the morning they let us go." Two of Anton's three sons, Anton Jr. and Friedl, escaped Germany to the U.S. before the war. Both became U.S. citizens and were college professors. One of his three daughters, Martha Krause-Lang, was professor for economics and social work at Munich.

== Posthumous rumours and confusion with Alois Lang ==
According to an urban myth given credence by a number of obituaries of director Billy Wilder notably in the Independent and The New York Times, Lang was a hardline fascist and led, in 1938, a violent attack on the sole Jew living in Oberammergau at the time. He was not allowed to appear in post-war Passion Plays by an artistic censorship committee, because of his record. The Wilder comment and the artistic censorship comment may refer to Alois Lang, the Christus of 1930 and 1934, who was subject of a denazification court in 1947.

== Notes ==
Awards and achievements
Preceded by Albert Baird Cummins	Cover of Time magazine 17 December 1923	Succeeded by George Bernard Shaw
