= 1918 Iowa gubernatorial election =

- November 5, 1918
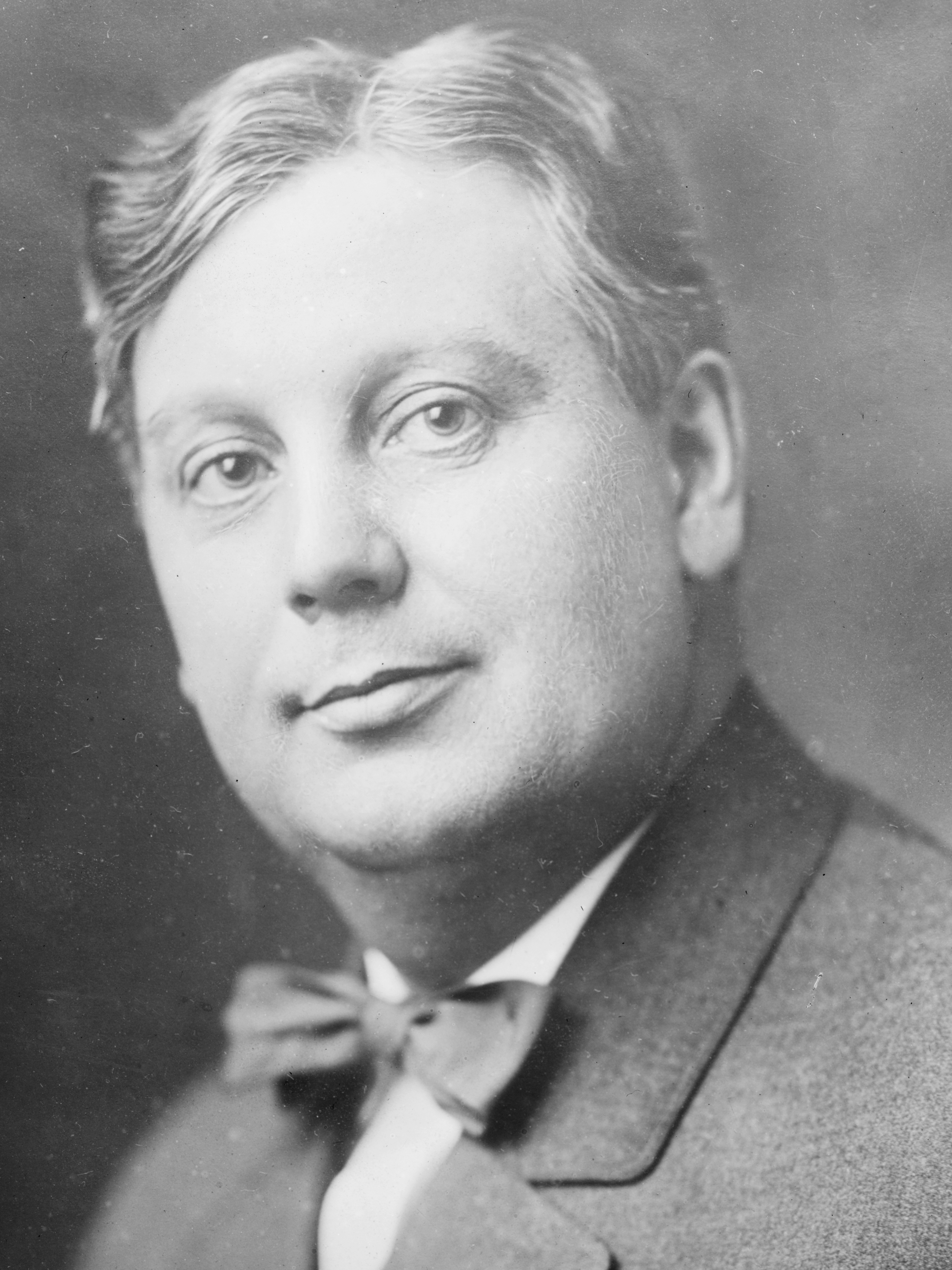

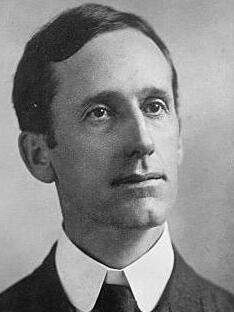
Nominee	William L. Harding	Claude R. Porter
Party	Republican	Democratic
Popular vote	192,662	178,815
Percentage	50.55%	46.92%
- County results Harding: 40–50% 50–60% 60–70% Porter: 40–50% 50–60% 60–70%
Governor before election
William L. Harding
Republican
Elected Governor
William L. Harding
Republican

The 1918 Iowa gubernatorial election was held on November 5, 1918. Republican nominee William L. Harding defeated Democratic nominee Claude R. Porter with 50.55% of the vote.

== General election ==
=== Candidates ===
Major party candidates

- William L. Harding, Republican
- Claude R. Porter, Democratic

Other candidates

- Andrew Engle, Socialist
- M. L. Christian, Prohibition

=== Results ===
1918 Iowa gubernatorial election
Party	Candidate	Votes	%	±%
Republican	William L. Harding (incumbent)	192,662	50.55%	
Democratic	Claude R. Porter	178,815	46.92%	
Socialist	Andrew Engle	8,005	2.10%	
Prohibition	M. L. Christian	1,625	0.43%	
Majority		13,847		
Turnout				
Republican hold		Swing		
