= Albert Baird Cummins House =

Historic house in Iowa, United States

- U.S. National Register of Historic Places
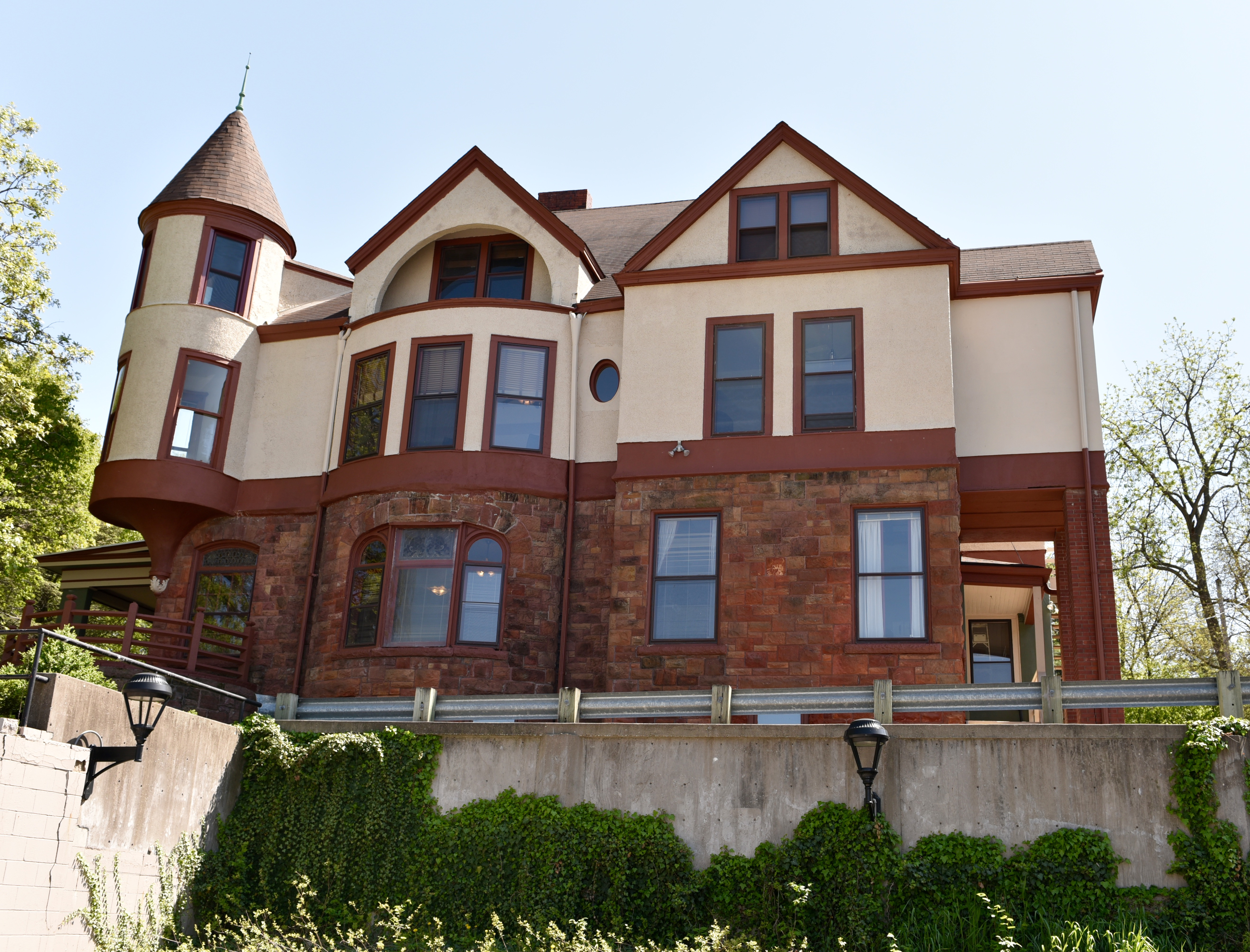

- Location within Iowa Location within the United States
- Location: 2404 Forest Dr. Des Moines, Iowa
- Coordinates: 41°35′02.4″N 93°39′1.5″W
- Area: less than one acre
- Built: 1893
- Architectural style: Queen Anne
- NRHP reference No.: 82002634
- Added to NRHP: June 30, 1982

The Albert Baird Cummins House, also known as Terrace Tower, is a historic building located in Des Moines, Iowa, United States. This 2 1/2-story stone and stucco Queen Anne was built in 1893. It is significant because of its association with Albert Baird Cummins who lived here from the time it was built until 1920. A Republican, Cummins served as Governor of Iowa from 1902 to 1908 and as United States Senator from 1908 until his death in 1926. He was a Progressive who supported the "Iowa Idea," which sought to destroy trusts by removing tariffs from trust made products. As a senator he sponsored the Esch-Cummins Act that returned the railroads to private control after the government took them over during World War I. The house was listed on the National Register of Historic Places in 1982.
