= Governor Hardinge =

Governor Hardinge may refer to:

- Charles Hardinge, 1st Baron Hardinge of Penshurst (1858–1944), Governor-General of India from 1910 to 1916
- Henry Hardinge, 1st Viscount Hardinge (1785–1856), Governor-General of India from 1844 to 1848

== See also ==
- Governor Harding (disambiguation)
