= 1926 United States Senate elections in Iowa =

1926 U.S. Senate election in Iowa
- November 2, 1926
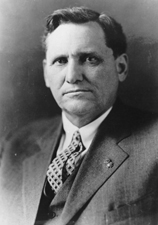

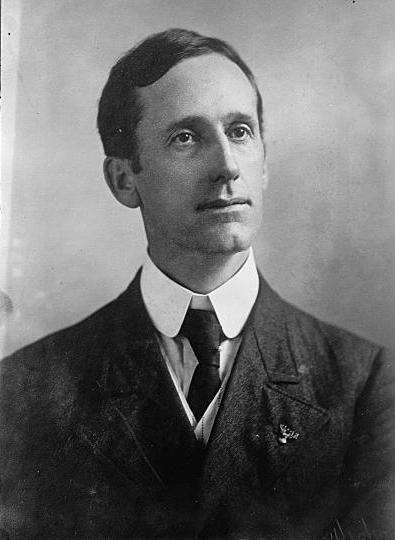
| Nominee | Smith W. Brookhart | Claude R. Porter |
| Party | Republican | Democratic |
| Popular vote | 323,409 | 247,869 |
| Percentage | 56.61% | 43.39% |
- County results Brookhart: 50–60% 60–70% 70–80% 80–90% Porter: 50–60% 60–70%
U.S. senator before election
David W. Stewart
Republican
Elected U.S. senator
Smith W. Brookhart
Republican

The 1926 United States Senate election in Iowa was held on November 2, 1926, alongside a concurrent special election to the same seat.

Incumbent Senator Albert B. Cummins ran for re-election to a fourth term in office but was defeated in the Republican primary by former Senator Smith W. Brookhart, who had been removed from office by a vote of the Senate in 1924.

After his primary loss, Senator Cummins died on July 30. Republicans nominated David W. Stewart, a Sioux City attorney and Cummins supporter, to run for the unexpired term ending in March 1927. Stewart was then appointed to the seat by Governor John Hammill and ran unopposed in the special election, which was held concurrently with the regular election.

== Background ==
Smith W. Brookhart was elected to the Senate in 1922, winning a special election to succeed William S. Kenyon. After joining the Senate, Brookhart's radicalism isolated him from both parties. His indifference to President Calvin Coolidge in the 1924 presidential election also upset conservatives. In 1924, he ran re-election to a full term, and it initially appeared he had narrowly defeated Democratic nominee Daniel Steck despite the defection of many conservative Republicans. However, Steck challenged the result in the U.S. Senate and, during a lengthy process, the Iowa Republican Party sided with Steck. Brookhart was removed from office on April 12, 1926, and replaced with Steck by a vote of 45–41. A dozen Senate Republicans voted with Democrats to unseat Brookhart.

Iowa's other Senator, Albert B. Cummins, was a respected political veteran and took no position in the contested 1924 election, at least in part because he believed Brookhart would challenge him if unseated. Though he was a leading American progressive in his early political career, Cummins's politics had gradually become more conservative following World War I.

== Republican primary ==
=== Candidates ===
- Smith W. Brookhart, former United States Senator
- Howard J. Clark
- Albert B. Cummins, incumbent Senator since 1908
- L. E. Eickelberg
- Dan B. Reardon

=== Campaign ===
As Brookhart was narrowly unseated on April 12, just two months before the primary, he had little time to return to Iowa and mount a campaign.

=== Results ===
1926 Republican U.S. Senate primary
| Party | Candidate | Votes | % |
|---|---|---|---|
| Republican | Smith W. Brookhart | 208,894 | 50.66% |
| Republican | Albert B. Cummins (incumbent) | 137,367 | 33.31% |
| Republican | Howard J. Clark | 54,392 | 13.19% |
| Republican | Dan B. Reardon | 6,037 | 1.46% |
| Republican | L.E. Eickelberg | 5,643 | 1.37% |
| Total votes | | 412,333 | 100.00% |

== Democratic primary ==
=== Candidates ===
- J. R. Files
- George Finch
- James C. Murtaugh
- Claude Porter, former State Senator from Centerville and nominee in 1920

=== Results ===
1926 Democratic U.S. Senate primary
| Party | Candidate | Votes | % |
|---|---|---|---|
| Democratic | Claude Porter | 28,077 | 48.85% |
| Democratic | James C. Murtaugh | 12,881 | 22.41% |
| Democratic | J. R. Files | 11,922 | 20.74% |
| Democratic | George Finch | 4,601 | 8.00% |
| Total votes | | 57,481 | 100.00% |

== Special election ==
=== Candidates ===
- David W. Stewart, Sioux City attorney and interim Senator

=== Results ===
1926 U.S. Senate special election in Iowa
| Party | Candidate | Votes | % |
|---|---|---|---|
| Republican | David W. Stewart (Incumbent) | 336,410 | 100.00% |
| Total votes | | 336,410 | 100.00% |
| Republican hold | | | |

== General election ==
=== Candidates ===
- Smith W. Brookhart, former Senator (1922–1926) (Republican)
- Claude Porter, former State Senator from Centerville and nominee in 1920 (Democratic)

=== Results ===
1926 U.S. Senate election in Iowa
| Party | Candidate | Votes | % | ±% |
|---|---|---|---|---|
| Republican | Smith W. Brookhart | 323,409 | 56.61% | |
| Democratic | Claude Porter | 247,869 | 43.39% | |
| Total votes | | 571,278 | 100.00% | |

== See also ==
- 1926 United States Senate elections
