= 1910 Iowa gubernatorial election =

- November 8, 1910
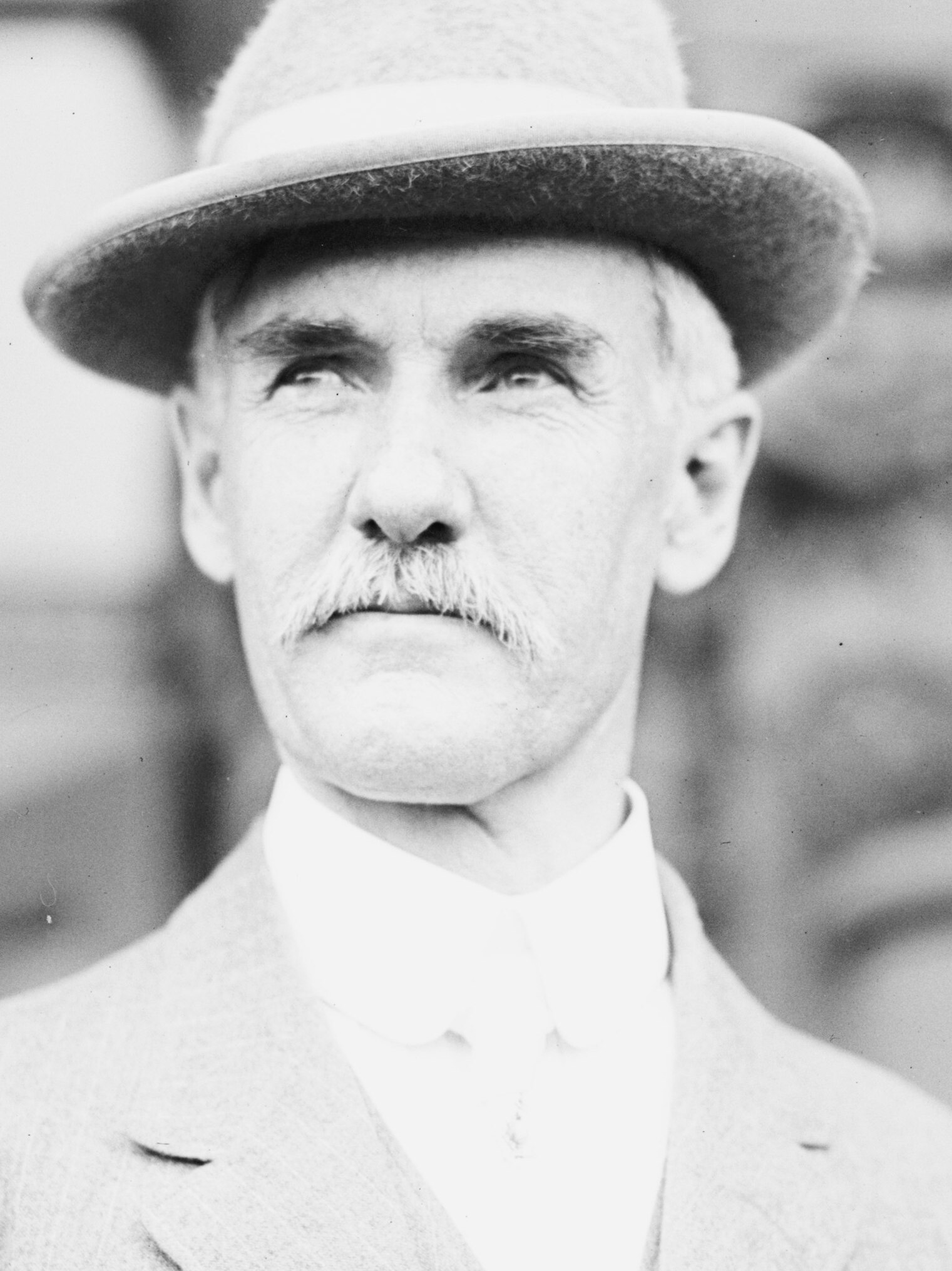

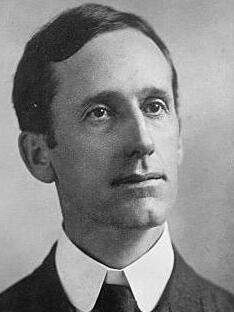
Nominee	Beryl F. Carroll	Claude R. Porter
Party	Republican	Democratic
Popular vote	205,678	187,353
Percentage	49.81%	45.37%
- County results Carroll: 40–50% 50–60% 60–70% 70–80% Porter: 40–50% 50–60% 60–70% 70–80%
Governor before election
Beryl F. Carroll
Republican
Elected Governor
Beryl F. Carroll
Republican

The 1910 Iowa gubernatorial election was held on November 8, 1910. Incumbent Republican Beryl F. Carroll defeated Democratic nominee Claude R. Porter with 49.81% of the vote.

== General election ==
=== Candidates ===
Major party candidates

- Beryl F. Carroll, Republican
- Claude R. Porter, Democratic

Other candidates

- A. MacEachron, Prohibition
- John M. Work, Socialist

=== Results ===
1910 Iowa gubernatorial election
Party	Candidate	Votes	%	±%
Republican	Beryl F. Carroll (incumbent)	205,678	49.81%	
Democratic	Claude R. Porter	187,353	45.37%	
Prohibition	A. MacEachron	10,248	2.48%	
Socialist	John M. Work	9,685	2.35%	
Majority		18,325		
Turnout				
Republican hold		Swing		
