= Warren Garst =

American politician (1850–1924)

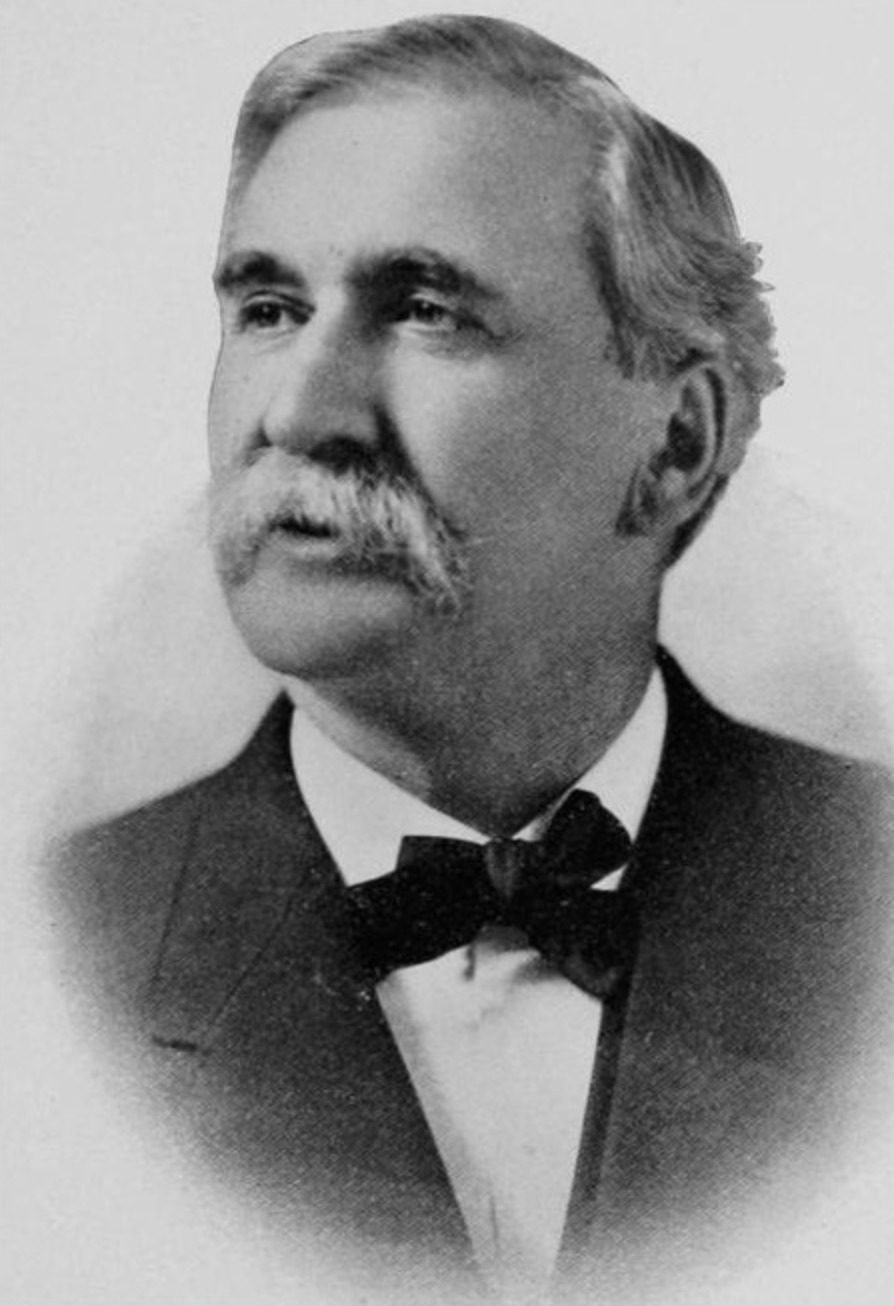

1st Industrial Commissioner of Iowa
- In office July 1913 – 1914
- Appointed by: George W. Clarke

19th Governor of Iowa
- In office November 24, 1908 – January 14, 1909
- Lieutenant: Vacant
- Preceded by: Albert B. Cummins
- Succeeded by: Beryl F. Carroll

20th Lieutenant Governor of Iowa
- In office January 17, 1907 – November 24, 1908
- Governor: Albert B. Cummins
- Preceded by: John Herriott
- Succeeded by: George W. Clarke

Member of the Iowa Senate from the 48th district
- In office January 8, 1894 – January 13, 1907

Personal details
- Born: December 4, 1850 Dayton, Ohio, US
- Died: October 5, 1924 (aged 73) Iowa City, Iowa, US
- Party: Republican
- Spouse(s): Elizabeth Johnson (died 1881); Clara H. Clark Lee (m. 1889)
- Children: 4
- Profession: Politician

Warren Garst (December 4, 1850 – October 5, 1924) was an American politician, Iowa state senator, a member of the Republican Party, the lieutenant governor of Iowa, and the 19th governor of Iowa.

== Early life ==
Garst was born to Dr. Michael Garst and Marie Louise Morrison in Dayton, Ohio. His father's side was descended from Holland and his mother's from Ireland. At age 8 he and his family moved to Champaign, Illinois. At age 19 he moved to Iowa to start his business career. He and his brother went to Coon Rapids, Iowa, to open a general store called The Garst Store. He later co-founded Iowa Savings Bank in Coon Rapids.

Garst and Elizabeth Johnson had one child, Ada Belle Garst. Elizabeth died in 1881. He then married to Clara H. Clark Lee, in 1889 in Boone, and had two children: Louise Garst and Warren Carroll Garst Jr.

== Political career ==
=== Iowa Senate ===
Garst started his political career when he ran for State Senate in 1893 and became a member of the Iowa Senate 1894. He served in the 25th through 31st General Assemblies (1894-1908). From 1896 to 1907, he was the chairman of the Senate Committee on Appropriations.

=== Lieutenant Governor and Governor ===
He was nominated for lieutenant governor at the Republican Convention in 1906 and was inaugurated on January 17, 1907.

When Governor Albert B. Cummins was elected into the United States Senate he was elevated to the position of Governor of Iowa. During his short time as governor he carried out the Cummins administration's policies. He was urged to run for a full term as governor, but lost the 1910 Republican primary to State Auditor Beryl F. Carroll 49% to 35%, with the votes being: Carroll receiving 88,834 votes; Garst, 63,737; and John J. Hamilton, 29,292.

=== Industrial Commissioner ===
In July 1913, Garst was appointed by Governor George W. Clarke to be Industrial Commissioner. He helped to get laws enacted to get workers compensated for industrial accidents.

== Later life ==
He died on October 5, 1924, and was buried at the Glendale Cemetery in Des Moines, Iowa.

Political offices
Preceded by John Herriott	Lieutenant Governor of Iowa; 1907–1908	Succeeded by George W. Clarke
Preceded by Albert B. Cummins	Governor of Iowa; 1908–1909	Succeeded by Beryl F. Carroll
