= Ernest Robert Moore =

American politician and banker (1869–1957)

Ernest Moore
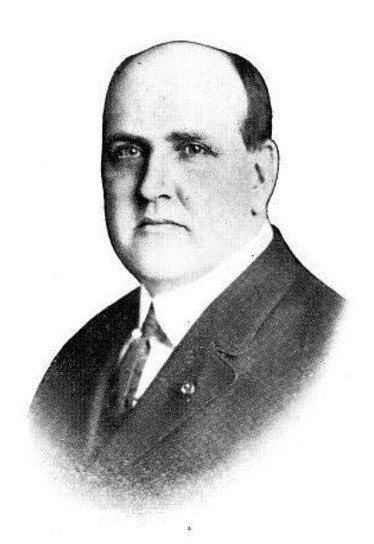
- Moore in 1919

23rd Lieutenant Governor of Iowa
- In office 1917–1921
- Governor: William L. Harding
- Preceded by: William L. Harding
- Succeeded by: John Hammill

Member of the Iowa House of Representatives
- In office January 14, 1907 – January 12, 1913
- Constituency: 48th District

Personal details
- Born: November 1, 1869 Anamosa, Iowa
- Died: March 4, 1957 (aged 87) Cedar Rapids, Iowa

Ernest Robert Moore (November 1, 1869 – March 4, 1957) was an American politician and banker.

Born in Anamosa, Iowa, he moved with his family to Cedar Rapids, Iowa. He served in the Spanish–American War. He was a banker in Cedar Rapids. Moore served in the Iowa House of Representatives from 1909 to 1913 and as Lieutenant Governor of Iowa under Governor William L. Harding between 1917 and 1921.

== Personal life ==
He married Winifred Evans of Cedar Rapids December 25, 1902. He was also a thirty-third degree Mason and became grand master of the Iowa supreme lodge in 1924. He died in Cedar Rapids, Iowa. Additionally, he was the department commander of the United States Spanish War Veterans. At the time of his death, he had three daughters, Mrs. Donald T. Brodines, Mrs. Robert M. Collins, and Mrs. Frank W. Davis. Additionally, he was the department commander of the United States Spanish War Veterans.

Political offices
Preceded by William L. Harding	Lieutenant Governor of Iowa; 1917–1921	Succeeded by John Hammill
