= 1903 Iowa gubernatorial election =

- November 3, 1903
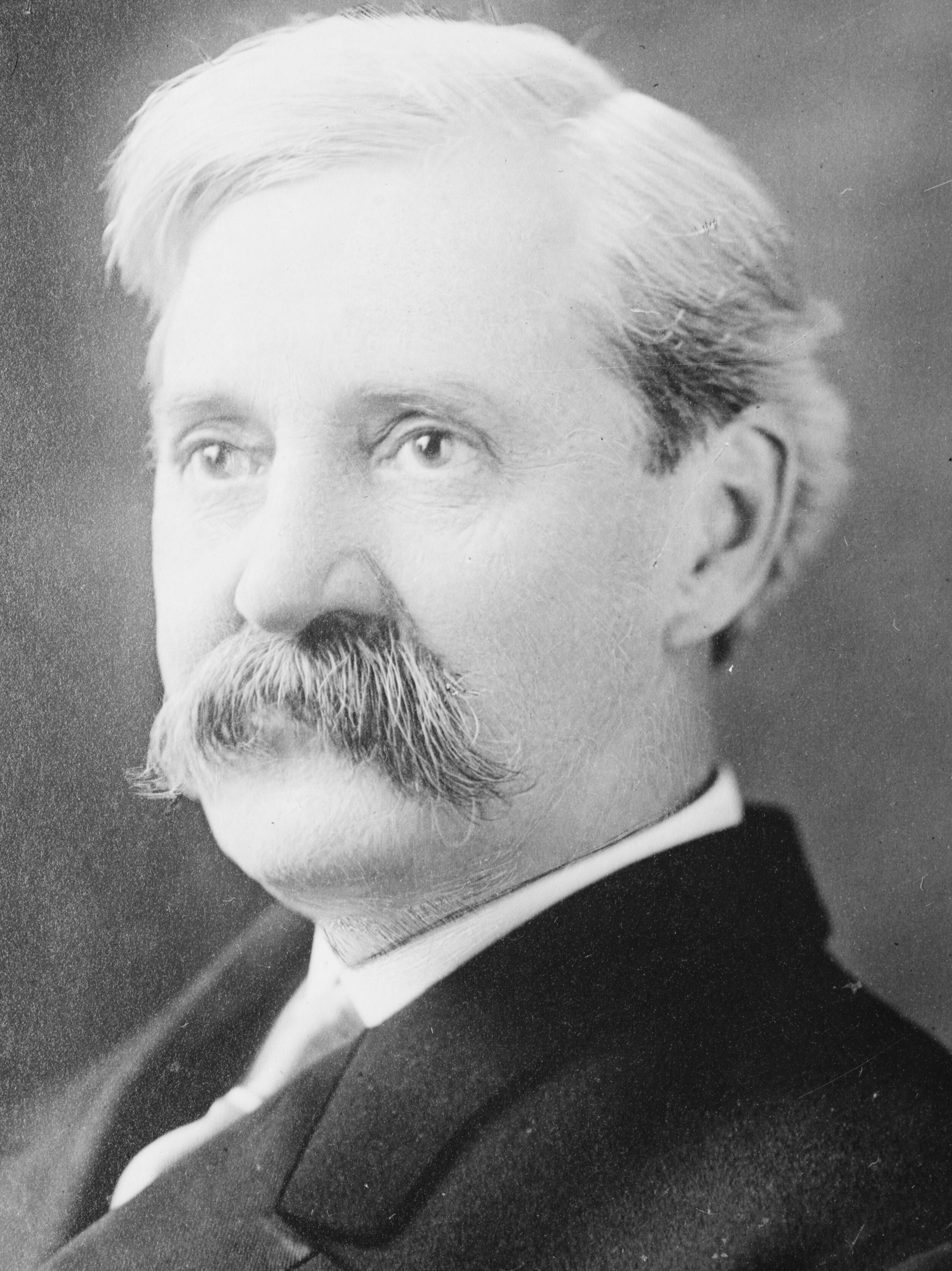

Nominee	Albert B. Cummins	J. B. Sullivan
Party	Republican	Democratic
Popular vote	238,804	159,725
Percentage	57.14%	38.22%
- County results Cummins: 40–50% 50–60% 60–70% 70–80% 80–90% Sullivan: 40–50% 50–60%
Governor before election
Albert B. Cummins
Republican
Elected Governor
Albert B. Cummins
Republican

The 1903 Iowa gubernatorial election was held on November 3, 1903. Incumbent Republican Albert B. Cummins defeated Democratic nominee J. B. Sullivan with 57.14% of the vote.

== General election ==
=== Candidates ===
Major party candidates

- Albert B. Cummins, Republican
- J. B. Sullivan, Democratic

Other candidates

- John F. Hanson, Prohibition
- John M. Work, Socialist
- Luman Hamlin Weller, People's

=== Results ===
1903 Iowa gubernatorial election
Party	Candidate	Votes	%	±%
Republican	Albert B. Cummins (incumbent)	238,804	57.14%	
Democratic	J. B. Sullivan	159,725	38.22%	
Prohibition	John F. Hanson	12,375	2.96%	
Socialist	John M. Work	6,421	1.54%	
Populist	Luman Hamlin Weller	594	0.14%	
Majority		79,079		
Turnout				
Republican hold		Swing		
