= 1901 Iowa gubernatorial election =

- November 5, 1901
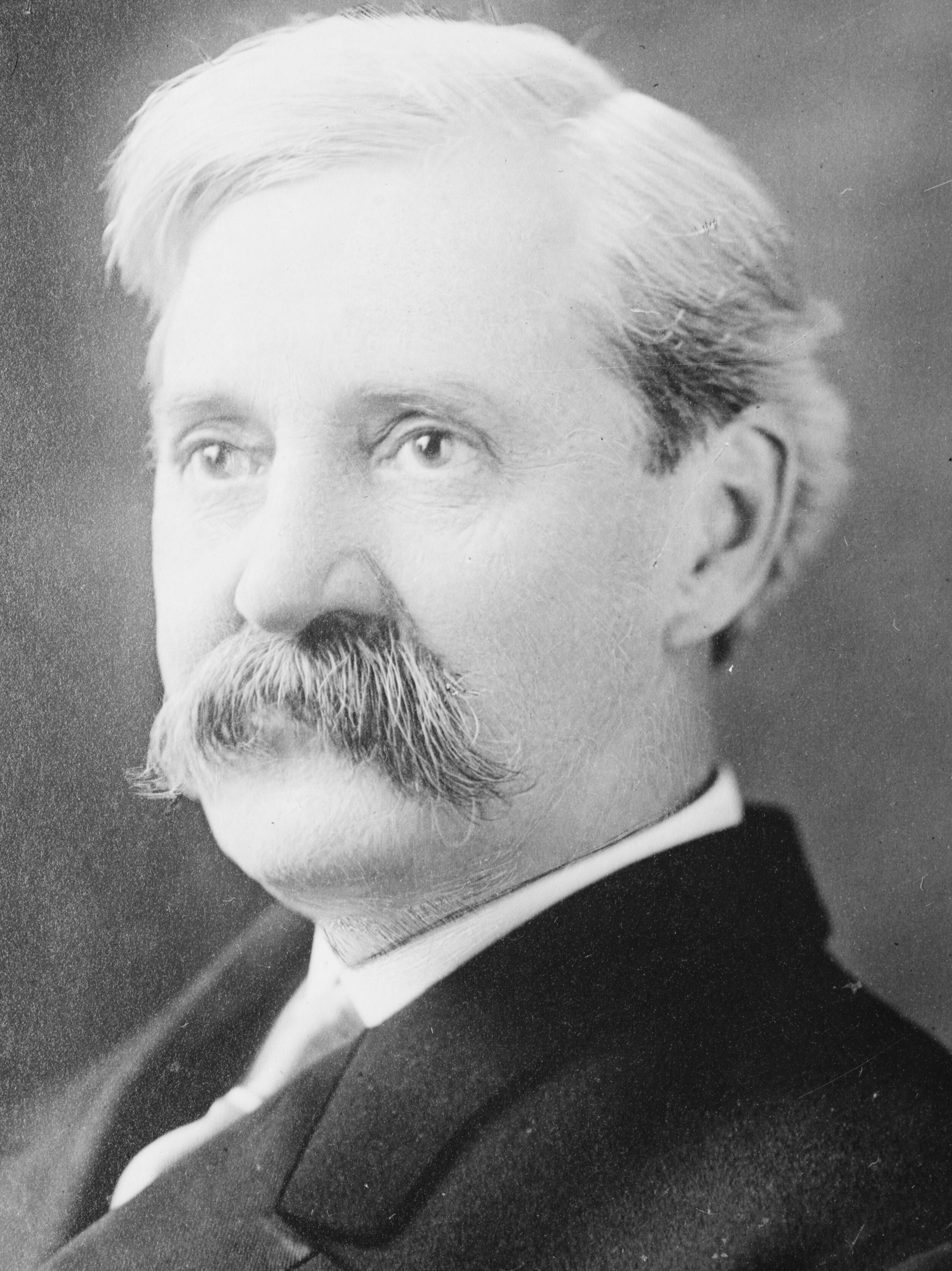

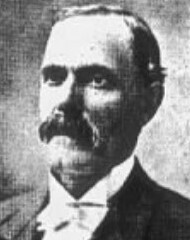
Nominee	Albert B. Cummins	T. J. Phillips
Party	Republican	Democratic
Popular vote	226,902	143,783
Percentage	58.09%	36.81%
- County results Cummins: 40–50% 50–60% 60–70% 70–80% 80–90% Phillips: 40–50% 50–60%
Governor before election
L. M. Shaw
Republican
Elected Governor
Albert B. Cummins
Republican

The 1901 Iowa gubernatorial election was held on November 5, 1901. Republican nominee Albert B. Cummins defeated Democratic nominee T. J. Phillips with 58.09% of the vote.

== General election ==
=== Candidates ===
Major party candidates

- Albert B. Cummins, Republican
- T. J. Phillips, Democratic

Other candidates

- A. U. Coates, Prohibition
- James Baxter, Socialist
- Luman Hamlin Weller, People's

=== Results ===
1901 Iowa gubernatorial election
Party	Candidate	Votes	%	±%
Republican	Albert B. Cummins	226,902	58.09%	
Democratic	T. J. Phillips	143,783	36.81%	
Prohibition	A. U. Coates	15,659	4.01%	
Socialist	James Baxter	3,463	0.89%	
Populist	Luman Hamlin Weller	782	0.20%	
Majority		83,119		
Turnout				
Republican hold		Swing		
