= 1920 United States Senate election in Iowa =

- November 2, 1920
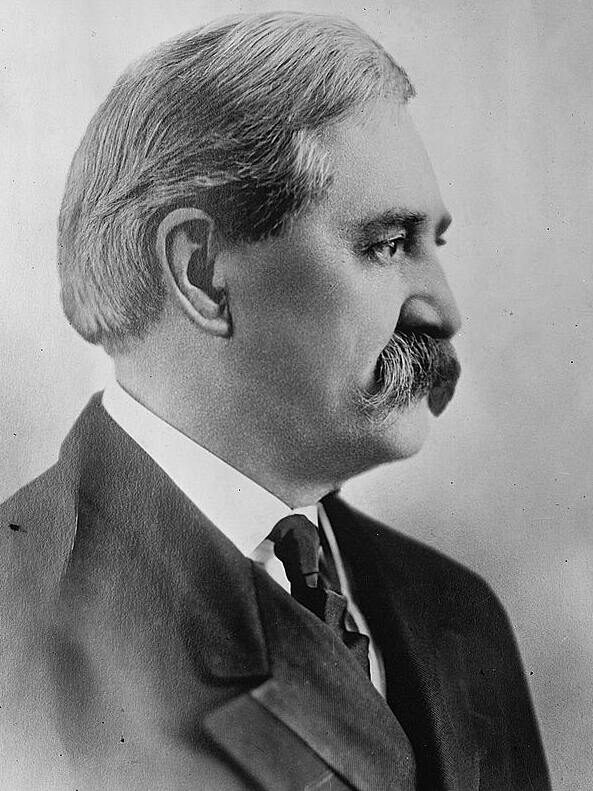

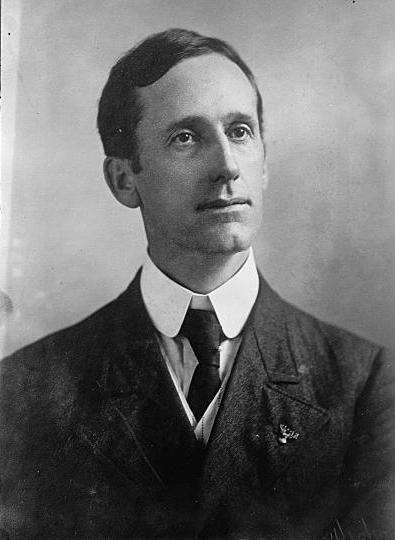
Nominee	Albert B. Cummins	Claude R. Porter
Party	Republican	Democratic
Popular vote	528,499	322,015
Percentage	61.42%	37.42%
- County results Cummins: 50–60% 60–70% 70–80% Porter: 50–60%
U.S. senator before election
Albert B. Cummins
Republican
Elected U.S. senator
Albert B. Cummins
Republican

The 1920 United States Senate election in Iowa was held on November 2, 1920. Incumbent Senator Albert B. Cummins was re-elected to a third term in office, defeating challenges from Smith W. Brookhart in the Republican primary and Claude R. Porter in the general election.

== Republican primary ==
=== Candidates ===
- Smith W. Brookhart, World War I veteran and marksman
- Albert B. Cummins, incumbent Senator since 1908

=== Campaign ===
Albert B. Cummins was a progressive senator from an earlier generation who distrusted both corporate interests and trade unions. Brookhart campaigned against railroad regulations Cummins had co-authored, the Esch–Cummins Act, which Brookhart claimed did too little to wrest ownership and control of railroads away from Wall Street interests. Brookhart attempted to register rank-and-file blue-collar workers as Republicans so that they could vote for him in the primary, which prompted Cummins to associate Brookhart with radical workers movements such as "the Socialists, reds and Industrial Workers of the World." Cummins was sidelined by illness in the weeks leading up to the primary but defeated Brookhart.

=== Results ===
1920 Republican U.S. Senate primary
Party	Candidate	Votes	%
Republican	Albert B. Cummins (incumbent)	115,768	54.52%
Republican	Smith W. Brookhart	96,563	45.48%
Total votes		212,331	100.00%

== Democratic primary ==
=== Candidates ===
- Claude Porter, former State Senator from Centerville

=== Results ===
1920 Democratic U.S. Senate primary
Party	Candidate	Votes	%
Democratic	Claude Porter	38,515	100.00%
Total votes		38,515	100.00%

== General election ==
=== Candidates ===
- H. W. Cowles (Farmer–Labor)
- Albert B. Cummins, incumbent Senator since 1908 (Republican)
- Arthur S. Dowler (Socialist Labor)
- Claude Porter, former State Senator from Centerville (Democratic)

=== Results ===
1920 U.S. Senate election in Iowa
Party	Candidate	Votes	%	±%
Republican	Albert B. Cummins (incumbent)	528,499	61.42%	
Democratic	Claude Porter	322,015	37.42%	
Farmer–Labor	H. W. Cowles	9020	1.05%	
Socialist Labor	Arthur S. Dowler	933	0.11%	
Republican hold				
Total votes		860,467	100.00%	

== See also ==
- 1920 United States Senate elections
