= 1906 Iowa gubernatorial election =

- November 6, 1906
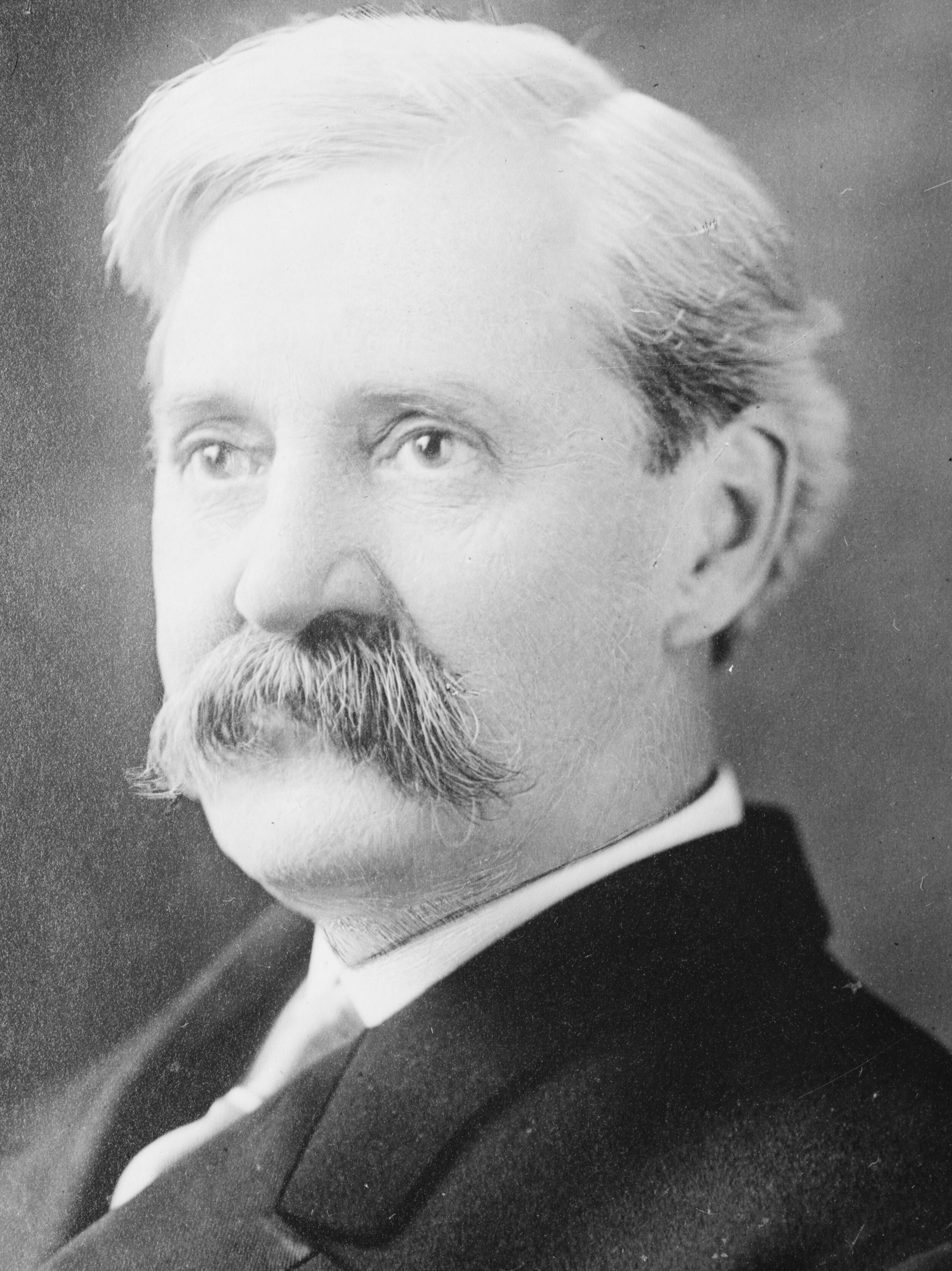

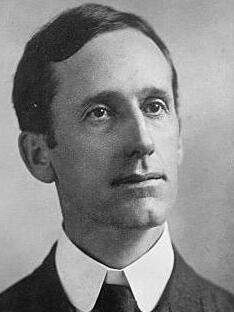
Nominee	Albert B. Cummins	Claude R. Porter
Party	Republican	Democratic
Popular vote	216,995	196,123
Percentage	50.18%	45.36%
- County results Cummins: 40–50% 50–60% 60–70% 70–80% 80–90% Porter: 40–50% 50–60% 60–70%
Governor before election
Albert B. Cummins
Republican
Elected Governor
Albert B. Cummins
Republican

The 1906 Iowa gubernatorial election was held on November 6, 1906. Incumbent Republican Albert B. Cummins defeated Democratic nominee Claude R. Porter with 50.18% of the vote.

== General election ==
=== Candidates ===
Major party candidates

- Albert B. Cummins, Republican
- Claude R. Porter, Democratic

Other candidates

- Lorenzo S. Coffin, Prohibition
- John E. Shank, Socialist
- J. R. Norman, People's
- Andrew Townsend Hisey, Independent

=== Results ===
1906 Iowa gubernatorial election
Party	Candidate	Votes	%	±%
Republican	Albert B. Cummins (incumbent)	216,995	50.18%	
Democratic	Claude R. Porter	196,123	45.36%	
Prohibition	Lorenzo S. Coffin	9,872	2.28%	
Socialist	John E. Shank	8,728	2.02%	
Populist	J. R. Norman	347	0.08%	
Independent	Andrew Townsend Hisey	340	0.08%	
Majority		20,872		
Turnout				
Republican hold		Swing		
