= Logan Park Cemetery (Sioux City) =

Cemetery in Woodbury County, Iowa

Coordinates: 42.538°N 96.431°W

- Interactive map of Logan Park Cemetery

Details
- Location: Sioux City, Iowa

Logan Park Cemetery is a cemetery located at the northwest edge of Sioux City, Woodbury County, Iowa. The cemetery contains a number of notable figures from the history of Sioux City.

== Notable burials ==
- Jay Darling, cartoonist.
- David W. Stewart, U.S. Senator in 1926 and 1927
- George Foreman, professional boxer
