= Beryl F. Carroll =

American politician

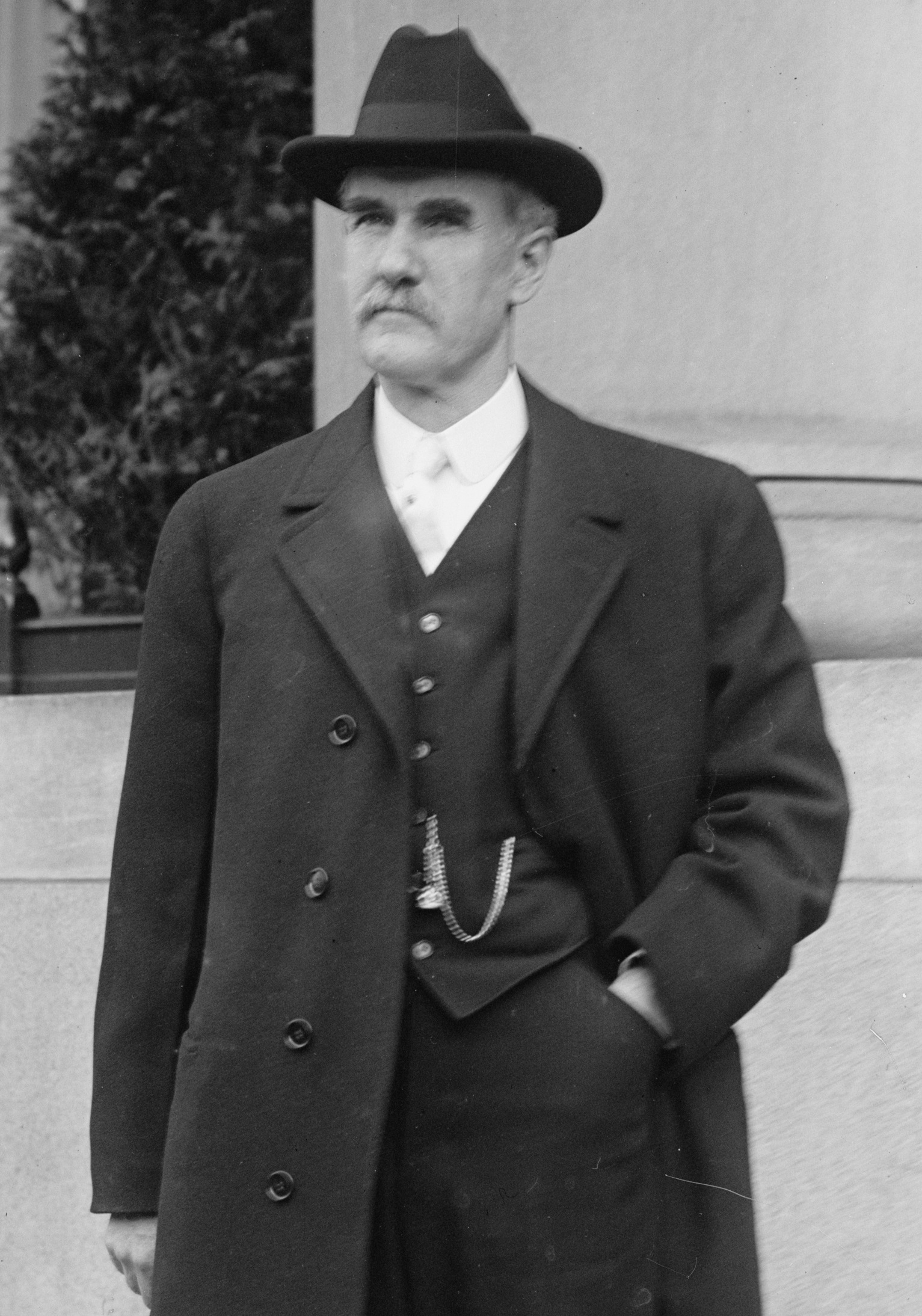
- Carroll in 1912

20th Governor of Iowa
- In office January 14, 1909 – January 16, 1913
- Lieutenant: George W. Clarke
- Preceded by: Warren Garst
- Succeeded by: George W. Clarke

18th Iowa State Auditor
- In office 1903–1909
- Governor: Albert B. Cummins
- Preceded by: Frank Merriam
- Succeeded by: John L. Bleakly

Postmaster of Bloomfield, Iowa
- In office 1898–1903
- Preceded by: A. H. Fortune

Member of the Iowa Senate from the 3rd district
- In office January 13, 1896 – January 7, 1900
- Preceded by: Ephraim M. Reynolds
- Succeeded by: Claude R. Porter

Personal details
- Born: March 15, 1860 Davis County, Iowa, US
- Died: December 16, 1939 (aged 79) Bloomfield, Iowa, US
- Party: Republican
- Spouse: Jennie Dodson (m.1886)
- Children: 2

Beryl Franklin Carroll (March 15, 1860 – December 16, 1939) was the 20th governor of Iowa from 1909 to 1913. He was the first native-born governor of Iowa.

== Early life ==
Carroll was born in Davis County, Iowa, the second youngest of 13 to Willis and Christena Carroll. He graduated from the Missouri State Normal School in 1884, where he received a Bachelor of Science in Education. He would spend the next 5 years teaching, first as a principal in Jamesport, Missouri then as superintendent in Rich Hill, Missouri.

On June 15, 1886, he married his fellow Truman State student Jennie Dodson. They had a son, Paul, born in 1889, and daughter, Jean, born in 1900.

On January 1, 1891, he bought half of the Davis County Republican, co-owning it with A. H. Fortune, the postmaster of Bloomfield at the time. In 1893, he bought out the full interest of the newspaper.

== Political career ==
He was a member of the Iowa Senate (1896–1900), Postmaster of Bloomfield, Iowa (1898–1903), and Iowa State Auditor (1903–1909). He was elected Governor in 1908 and reelected in 1910.

During his tenure, Carroll established the State Board of Education, helped in getting firefighters and police officers a pension plan and advocating for miners.

On November 30, 1910, Governor Carroll was hailed as a hero for entering a burning building in Des Moines and retrieving a trunk containing valuable property.

== Later life ==
After leaving office, Carroll worked in the life insurance business in Des Moines. He died in Bloomfield, and was buried at the Odd Fellows Cemetery in Bloomfield.

His nephew, Herbert Carroll, was also a Senator from Iowa's 3rd Senate district from 1931 to 1933.

Party political offices
| Preceded by Albert B. Cummins | Republican nominee Governor of Iowa; 1908, 1910 | Succeeded by George W. Clarke |
Political offices
| Preceded by Frank Merriam | State Auditor of Iowa; 1903–1909 | Succeeded by John L. Bleakly |
| Preceded by Warren Garst | Governor of Iowa; 1909–1913 | Succeeded by George W. Clarke |
