= Babel Proclamation =

Proclamation issued in Iowa

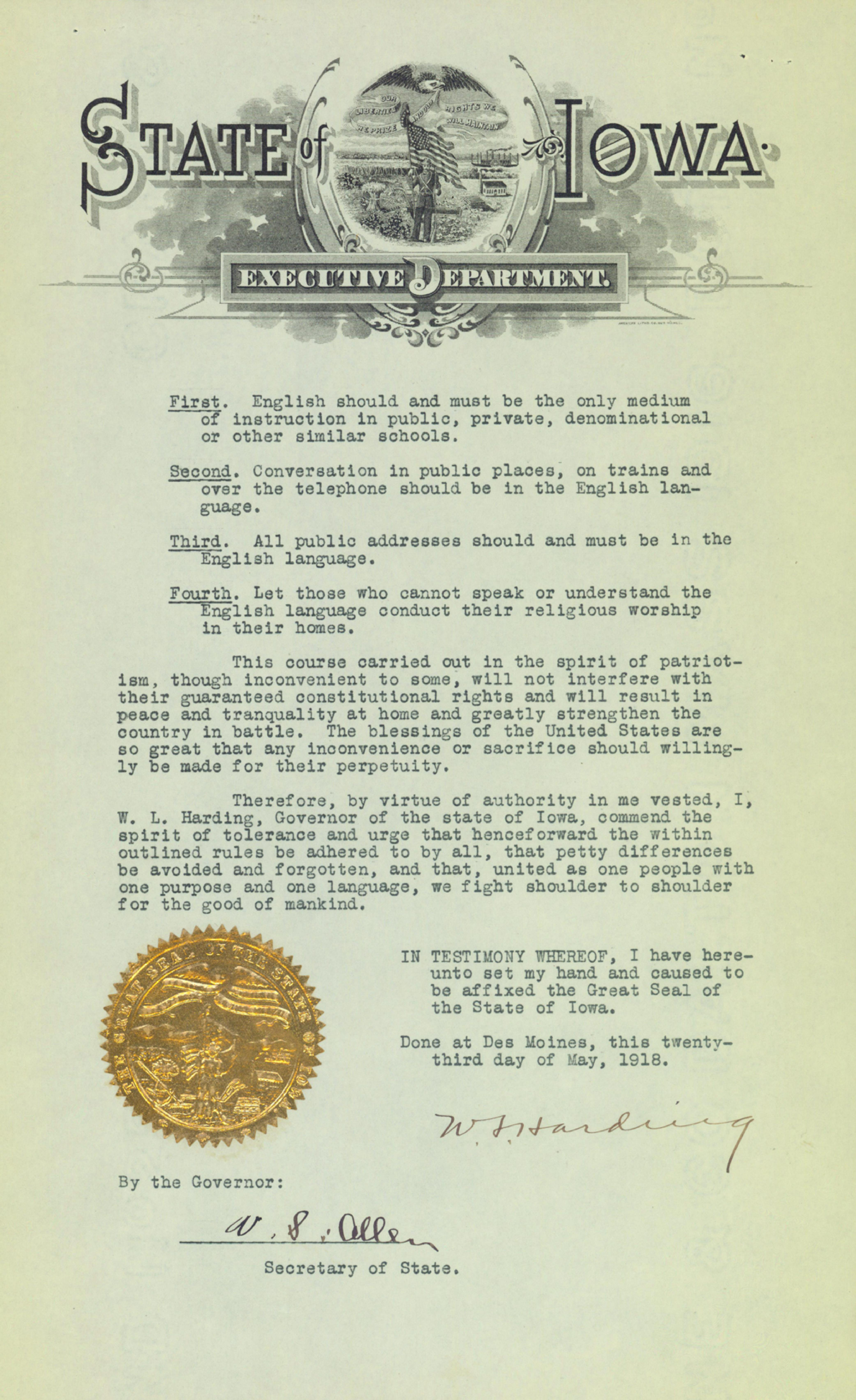
The Babel Proclamation

The Babel Proclamation was issued by Iowa's Governor William L. Harding on May 23, 1918. It forbade the speaking of any language besides English in public. The proclamation was controversial, supported by many established English-speaking Iowans and notably opposed by citizens who spoke languages other than English. Harding repealed it on December 4, 1918. The Babel Proclamation marked the peak of a wave of anti-German sentiment in Iowa during World War I.

== Rise in anti-German sentiment ==
As America became involved in World War I on the side of the Allies and against Germany, the nation saw a rise in anti-German sentiment. Nativism, which had existed before the war, became increasingly mainstream as a result of American intervention. The state of Iowa saw a particularly large rise in anti-German sentiment. On November 23, 1917, the Iowa State Council for Defense determined that German should not be taught in public schools and took actions to that effect, such as burning German books. Iowa also saw places that had German-related names renamed, such as Germania being renamed to Lakota. Some German-Americans were attacked for speaking their language in public. In 1900 there were 46 German-language newspapers in Iowa; 20 years later there were just 16.

== Description ==
The Governor of Iowa, William L. Harding, issued the Babel Proclamation on May 23, 1918. It stated that Iowa schools must teach their courses in English, public conversations had to be in English, addresses in public were to be given in English, and religious services were to be in English. Harding asserted that allowing languages other than English to be spoken "disturbs the peace and quiet of the community" and would lead to "discord among neighbors and citizens." He maintained that all non-English languages could be used to spread German propaganda. He further argued that the proclamation would "save the lives of American boys overseas by curbing sedition at home." Harding stated that the proclamation should be treated as law, although it was accused of violating the First Amendment to the United States Constitution, which guarantees freedom of speech. He argued that the amendment did not apply to languages other than English.

In response to the mandate, there were several protests, including one led by a priest at St. Wenceslaus Catholic Church on May 30. Scandinavian speakers were not excluded from the discrimination; one Lutheran pastor wrote to his representative in May 1918 complaining that half his congregation would be unable to understand the service if it were not conducted in Norwegian, the language in which he had been preaching for the past 40 years. The next month, Harding stated that "there is no use in anyone wasting his time praying in languages other than English. God is listening only to the English tongue."

However, it was generally popular among English-speaking, well established Iowans. Former US President Theodore Roosevelt publicly supported Harding's decision in a speech given on May 27, saying "America is a nation—not a polyglot boarding house ... There can be but one loyalty—to the Stars and Stripes; one nationality—the American—and therefore only one language—the English language." Virtually all ethnic minorities who spoke languages other than English opposed the proclamation to some extent. The proclamation was seriously enforced, and many "patriotic organizations" issued fines to violators. The majority of violators were caught when telephone operators listened to conversations for violations. For instance, in Le Claire Township, Scott County, four or five women received fines after they spoke German over the telephone. They ended up paying $225, which was donated to the Red Cross. Nebraska issued a similar proclamation. Across the Midwestern United States, 18,000 people eventually faced charges of violating English mandates.

The proclamation became "the major political issue" in Iowa for 1918. The Des Moines Register led opposition, publishing several op-eds against the proclamation.A Jewish leader in Des Moines contacted Louis Marshall, then the president of the American Jewish Committee, for advice. Marshall responded that he couldn't "conceive the possibility that the people of any state could be guilty of such an absurdity." However, he advised the Jewish community to avoid publicly going against the proclamation. On June 13 Marshall wrote a letter of protest to Harding.

People debated the proclamation across the state and more generally what it meant to be "American". Some newspapers called English "American", as calling it English would suggest that it was "borrowed, and therefore any European tongue would be as legitimate as English." After World War I ended, Harding repealed the proclamation on December 4, 1918.

== Legacy ==
A 2018 op-ed published in The Des Moines Register called the Babel Proclamation "perhaps the most infamous executive order" in Iowa's history. Several articles have cited the proclamation as an early example of anti-immigrant sentiment. A hearing in the United States House of Representatives in 2006 called the proclamation "the most famous" of several "English-only" restrictions passed around the same time.
