= Albert B. Cummins =

Politician, governor, and senator from Iowa (1850–1926)

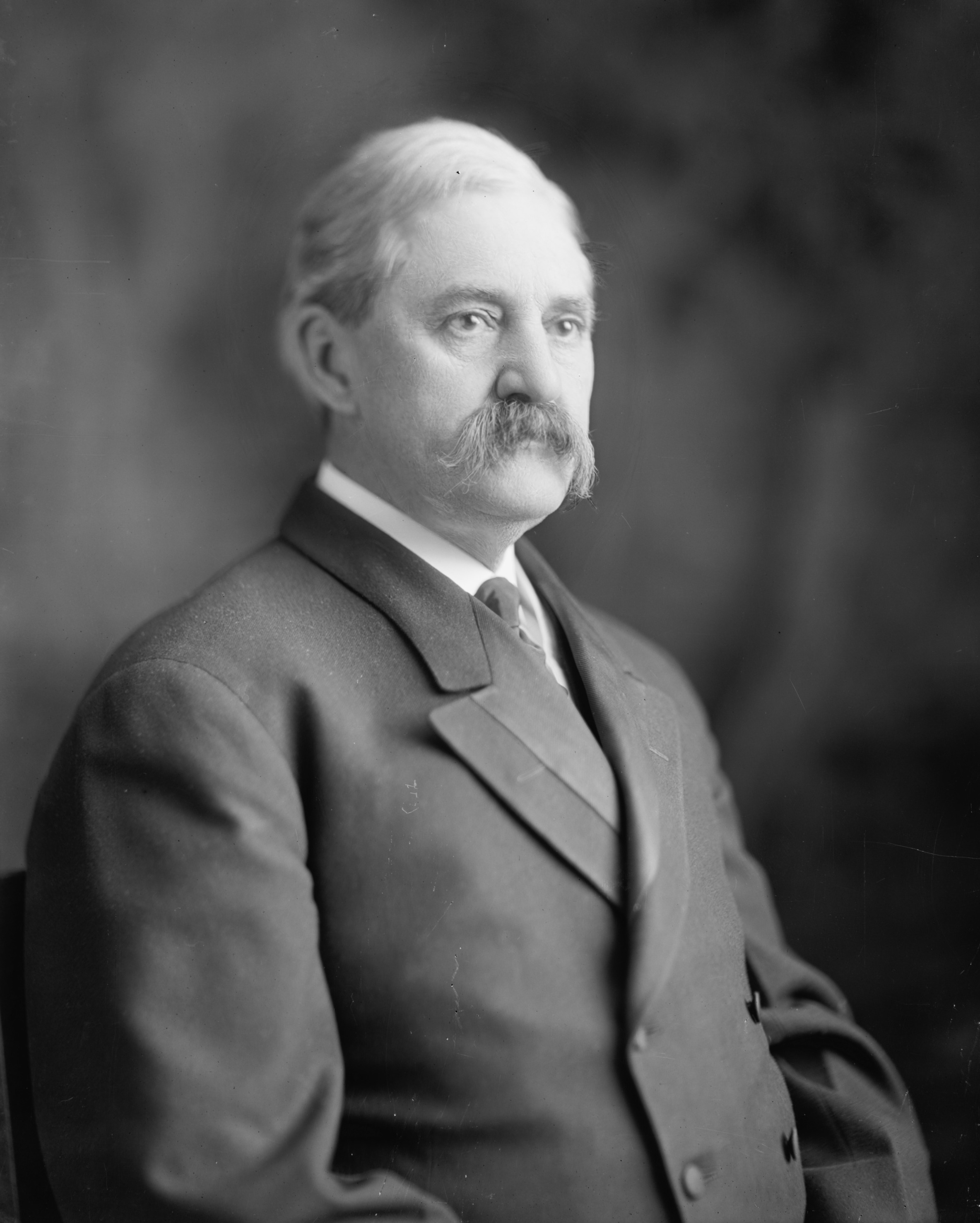
- Cummins, 1905–1926

President pro tempore of the United States Senate
- In office May 19, 1919 – March 6, 1925
- Preceded by: Willard Saulsbury Jr.
- Succeeded by: George H. Moses

United States Senator from Iowa
- In office November 24, 1908 – July 30, 1926
- Preceded by: William B. Allison
- Succeeded by: David W. Stewart

18th Governor of Iowa
- In office January 16, 1902 – November 24, 1908
- Lieutenant: John Herriott; Warren Garst
- Preceded by: Leslie M. Shaw
- Succeeded by: Warren Garst

Member of the Iowa House of Representatives
- In office January 9, 1888 – January 12, 1890
- Preceded by: Wesley Redhead
- Succeeded by: Bradford B. Lane
- Constituency: 22nd district

Member of the Iowa Senate
- In office 1887–1888

Personal details
- Born: Albert Baird Cummins; February 15, 1850 Carmichaels, Pennsylvania, US
- Died: July 30, 1926 (aged 76) Des Moines, Iowa, US
- Party: Republican
- Spouse: Ida L. Cummins
- Children: 1

Albert Baird Cummins (February 15, 1850 – July 30, 1926) was an American lawyer and politician. He was the 18th governor of Iowa, elected to three consecutive terms and U.S. Senator for Iowa, serving for 18 years. Cummins was a leader of the Progressive movement in Washington and Iowa. He fought to break up monopolies. Cummins' successes included establishing the direct primary to allow voters to select candidates instead of bosses; outlawing free railroad passes for politicians; imposing a two-cent street railway maximum fare; and abolishing corporate campaign contributions. He tried, with less success, to lower the high protective tariff in Washington.

== Early life ==
Cummins was born in a log house in Carmichaels, Pennsylvania, the son of Sarah Baird (Flenniken) and Thomas L. Cummins, a carpenter who also farmed. He attended different schools including the Greene Academy at Carmichaels, and was matriculated at Waynesburg College.

He completed required classes at Waynesburg College, but was not graduated because of a dispute with the college's president regarding Darwinism. After leaving college, he initially became a tutor and taught at a country school. At age nineteen, Cummins came with his maternal uncle to Elkader, Iowa, finding employment in the Clayton County recorder's office and also worked as a carpenter. In 1871, he relocated to Allen County, Indiana, where he labored as a railway clerk, carpenter, construction engineer, express company manager, and deputy county surveyor.

== Lawyer ==
Cummins moved to Chicago where he studied law while clerking in an attorney's office; he was admitted to the Illinois Bar in 1875. After practicing law in Chicago for three years, he set up a practice in Des Moines, Iowa. At first, Cummins mainly represented businessmen in court, thus improving his finances and achieving prominence in Des Moines' high society. However, in his most famous case as an attorney he represented a group of Iowa farmers from the Grange movement against Washburn and Moen, a barbed wire trust, as farmers tried to break an eastern syndicate's monopoly of the production of barbed wire by running their own factory. However, historians consider his representation of farmers in the barbed wire case to be an anomaly because more often he represented corporations or businessmen.

== Political career ==
After identifying with the Republican Party, Cummins became active first in state and later in national politics. He attended every state and national Republican convention between 1880 and 1924, he served as an Iowa state legislator in 1888 to 1890, he was a presidential elector in 1892, and he was elected to the Republican National Committee in 1896 to 1900. Cummins found political support in the Progressive faction of the Iowa's GOP and challenged Iowa's Republican establishment represented by Senator William B. Allison, Congressman David B. Henderson and Representative William P. Hepburn.

In 1887, Cummins was elected to a single term in the Iowa State Senate representing Des Moines. He was asked to serve as temporary chair of the 1892 State Republican Convention. He unsuccessfully pursued a seat in the U.S. Senate in 1894. In 1896 he was active in the William McKinley campaign, and was appointed as Iowa's representative on the Republican National Committee.

=== Running for U.S. Senate ===
In 1900, Cummins was passed over twice for the U.S. Senate. In early 1900, when the Iowa General Assembly exercised its former power to choose a U.S. senator for the Class 2 seat, to serve from 1901 to 1907, Cummins was the opponent of incumbent Republican John H. Gear, but withdrew when it appeared he lacked the votes to win. After Gear suffered a fatal heart attack in July 1900, Governor Leslie M. Shaw rejected numerous appeals to appoint Cummins to the vacancy, and instead appointed Jonathan P. Dolliver. Cummins initially vowed to seek the seat again in the 1901 legislative session, but instead focused on winning the 1901 election for governor of Iowa.

=== Governor of Iowa ===
Cummins served as governor of Iowa between 1902 and 1908, becoming the first Iowa governor elected to three successive terms. In the third election he won tight races for the Republican nomination against George D. Perkins, editor of the Sioux City Journal, and in the general election against Democrat Claude R. Porter. While governor he led efforts to establish compulsory education, a state department of agriculture, and a system of primary elections.

Cummins became identified with an approach to tariff-setting known as "the Iowa idea". The "Iowa idea", as stated in the Iowa Republican Party's 1902 platform, favored "such amendments of the Interstate Commerce Act as will more fully carry out its prohibition of discrimination in ratemaking, and [such] modifications of the tariff schedules [as] may be required to prevent their affording a shelter to monopoly." The "Iowa idea" embodied the principle that tariff rates should accurately measure the difference between the cost of production here and abroad, but not set rates higher than necessary to protect home industries.

=== U.S. senator ===
Senator Albert B. Cummins in 1911

In June 1908, Governor Cummins ran in the Republican primary for the U.S. Senate seat held by William B. Allison, who was seeking a record seventh term. Cummins was accused of breaking an earlier promise not to challenge Allison, and lost by over 12,000 votes. However, Senator Allison died on August 4, 1908, two months after the primary and before the Iowa General Assembly chose among the primary winners. In November 1908, a second Republican primary was held, which Cummins won decisively. Later that month and again two months later, in January 1909, Cummins was appointed by the Iowa General Assembly over Democratic rival Claude R. Porter. He served as U.S. senator from Iowa for 18 years, from 1908 until his death in 1926. He served as president pro tempore of the U.S. Senate between 1919 and 1925. He also chaired the Senate Judiciary Committee and the Committee on Interstate Commerce.

Cummins generally supported President Woodrow Wilson's initiatives to regulate business, and authored a clause of the Sherman Antitrust Act. Although Cummins voted in favor of the 1917 United States declaration of war on Germany when Wilson requested it, he sided most often with his party than with Wilson on other foreign policy issues, opposing the arming of merchant ships in early 1917 and U.S. membership in a League of Nations in 1919 and 1920.

It was as Interstate Commerce Commission chair that Cummins sponsored the Esch-Cummins Act of 1920, establishing the conditions for the return of the railroads to private control after their government operation during World War I. Labor activists complained that the bill perpetuated harsh limits on collective bargaining, including provisions making it a crime to encourage a railroad strike, in the absence of a wartime emergency. It symbolized Cummins' postwar break with the progressive movement, which would ultimately contribute to his defeat.

=== Pursuit of the presidency ===
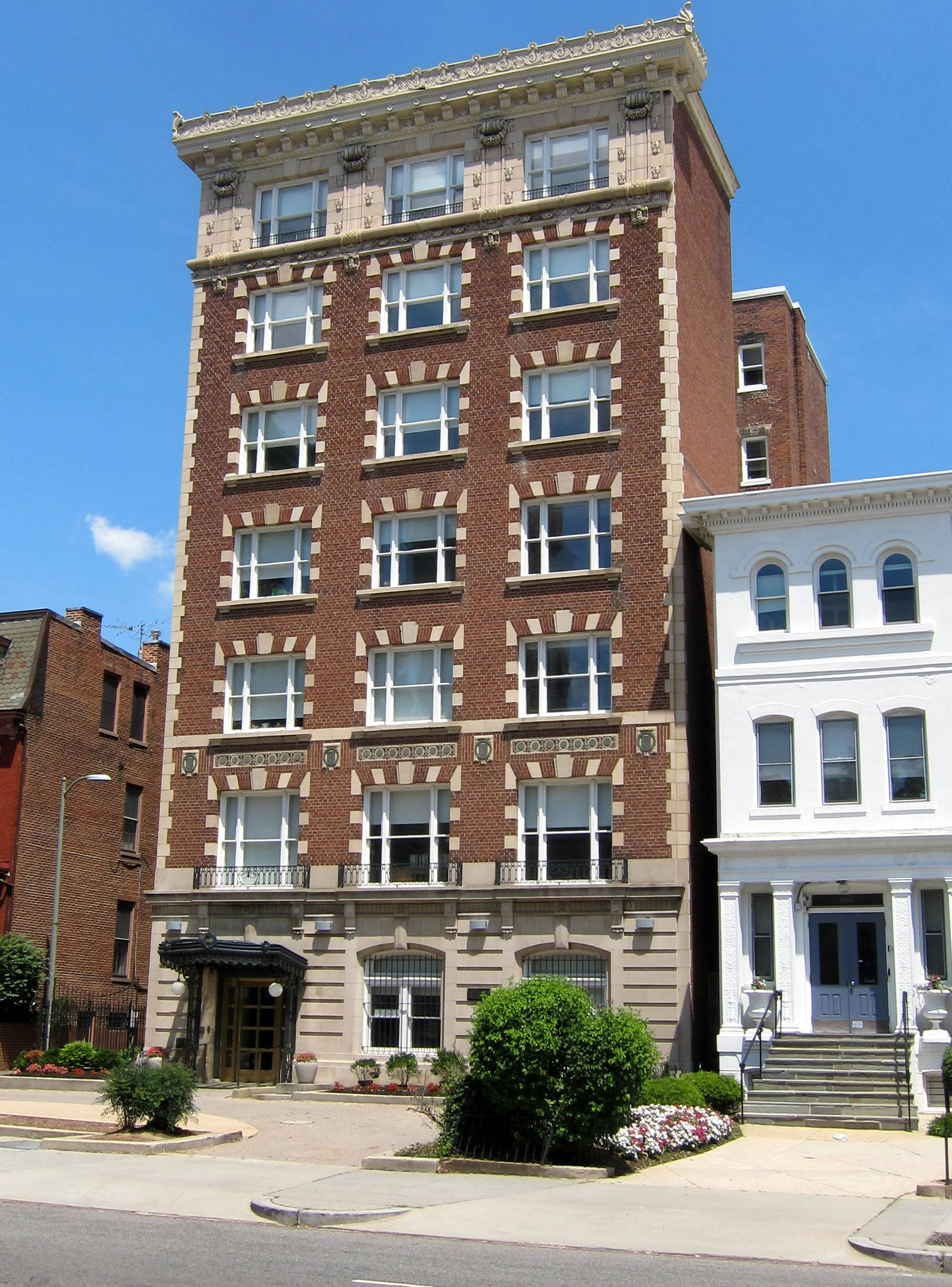
Cummins's former residence in Washington, D.C.

In January 1912, Cummins announced his intention to run for the Republican presidential nomination. He was considered as a candidate at the 1912 Republican National Convention. However, during the turmoil following the walkout of Theodore Roosevelt's supporters, Cummins's name was not placed in the presidential ballot. In the national election, Cummins supported Roosevelt rather than Taft, even though he opposed Roosevelt's creation of a third party.

In 1916, Cummins again ran for the Republican presidential nomination at the 1916 Republican National Convention. This time, with no incumbent president of his own party, delegates were split among over a dozen candidates on the first ballot on which Cummins finished fifth. After Cummins again finished fifth on the second ballot, he released his delegates, contributing to the third-ballot victory of Supreme Court Justice Charles Evans Hughes.

=== Defeat and death ===
In June 1926, insurgent Smith W. Brookhart defeated Cummins in the Republican primary for Cummins' Senate seat. Two months earlier, Brookhart had been removed from Iowa's other U.S. Senate seat when a majority of his colleagues in the Republican-controlled U.S. Senate voted in favor of Democrat Dan Steck's challenge to the outcome of the 1924 Brookhart-Steck race. Cummins had refused to take a position on the election contest, knowing that if Brookhart were unseated he would likely run for Cummins's seat. The month after his primary defeat, Cummins died in Des Moines. He is buried at the Woodland Cemetery there.

=== Political legacy ===
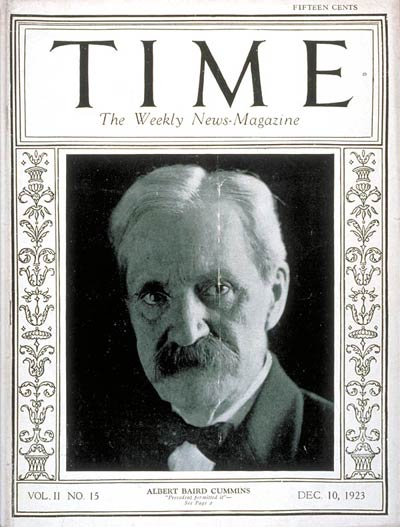
Time cover, December 10, 1923

Apart from being the Iowa governor and U.S. senator, Cummins is remembered for serving as president pro tempore of the Senate from 1919 to 1925. In addition, two times he declared his intentions to run for the Republican presidential nomination but did not succeed. Cummins was perhaps the most influential and charismatic Progressive leader in Iowa politics in the first quarter of the 20th century. However, he gradually turned more conservative moving from La Follette's Progressivism to the New Era Republicanism of Warren G. Harding. In the 1890s, he led the Iowa Republican Party's progressive wing, or the so-called insurgents, to power at the expense of its old guard of standpatters, who had controlled the party almost since its inception. After his postwar withdrawal from the progressive movement and shortly before his death, Cummins was defeated by a progressive contender within his own party.

== Family ==
On June 24, 1874, Cummins married Ida Lucette Gallery; they had one child, a daughter. His wife, Ida L. Cummins, was an activist in the suffrage movement and very influential in the development of Iowa child labor laws.

== See also ==
- List of members of the United States Congress who died in office (1900–1949)
- The Albert Baird Cummins House in Des Moines is listed on the National Register of Historic Places.

Party political offices
| Preceded by L. M. Shaw | Republican nominee Governor of Iowa; 1901, 1903, 1906 | Succeeded by Beryl F. Carroll |
| First | Republican nominee for U.S. senator from Iowa (Class 3); 1914, 1920 | Succeeded by David W. Stewart |
Political offices
| Preceded by Leslie M. Shaw | Governor of Iowa; January 16, 1902 – November 24, 1908 | Succeeded by Warren Garst |
| Preceded by Willard Saulsbury Jr. | President pro tempore of the United States Senate; May 19, 1919–March 6, 1925 | Succeeded by George H. Moses |
| Preceded by Frank B. Brandegee | Chairman of the Senate Judiciary Committee; 1924 – 1926 | Succeeded by George W. Norris |
U.S. Senate
| Preceded by William B. Allison | U.S. senator (Class 3) from Iowa; 1908 – 1926; Served alongside: Jonathan P. Dolliver, Lafayette Young, William S. Kenyon, Charles A. Rawson, Smith W. Brookhart, Daniel F. Steck | Succeeded by David W. Stewart |
Awards and achievements
| Preceded by Robert M. La Follette Sr. | Cover of Time magazine 10 December 1923 | Succeeded by Anton Lang |
