= William L. Harding =

American politician (1877–1934)

William Lloyd Harding
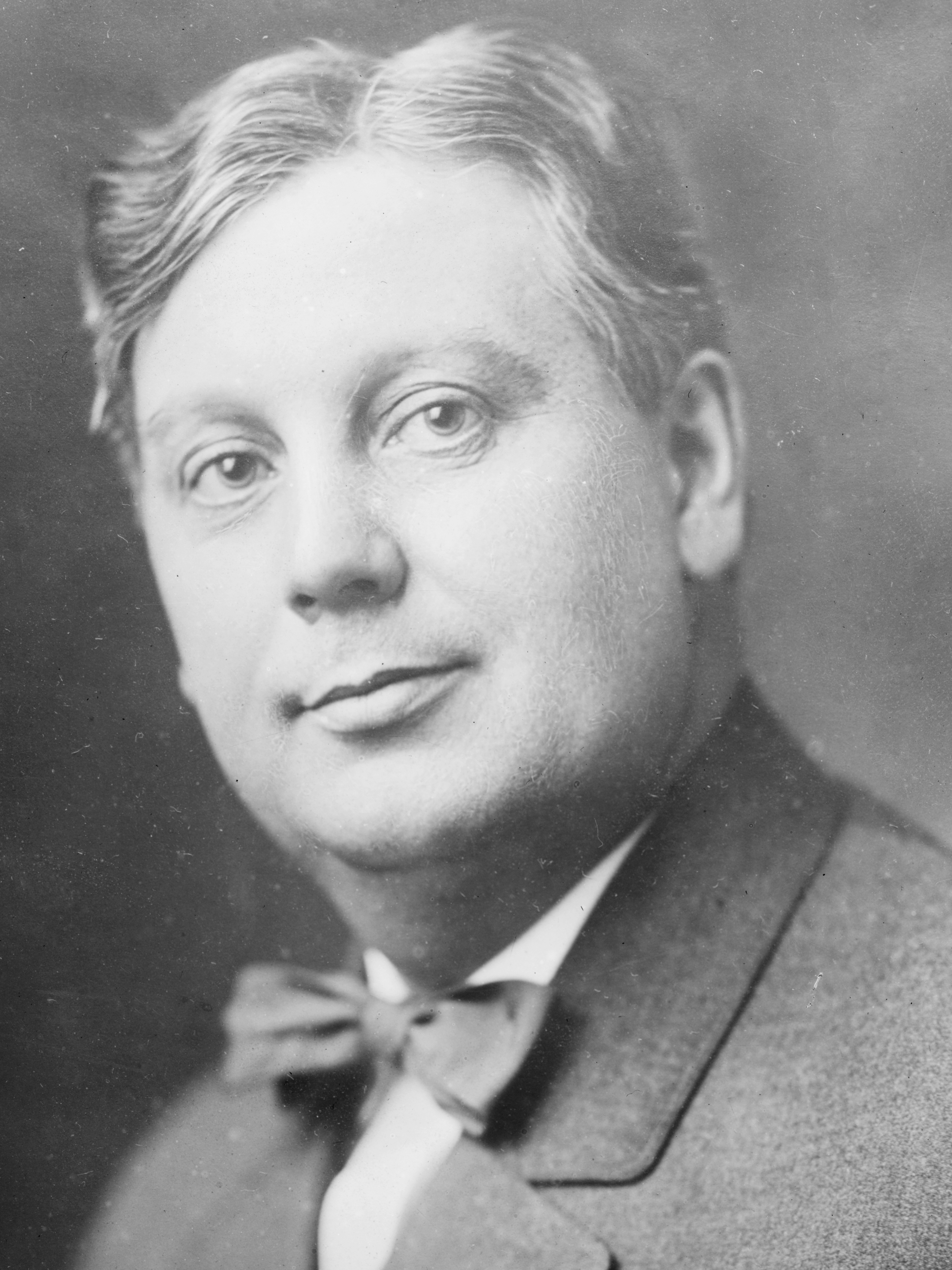

22nd Governor of Iowa
- In office January 11, 1917 – January 13, 1921
- Lieutenant: Ernest R. Moore
- Preceded by: George W. Clarke
- Succeeded by: Nathan E. Kendall

22nd Lieutenant Governor of Iowa
- In office January 16, 1913 – January 11, 1917
- Governor: George W. Clarke
- Preceded by: George W. Clarke
- Succeeded by: Ernest R. Moore

Member of the Iowa House of Representatives
- In office 1907–1913
- Constituency: 58th District

Personal details
- Born: October 3, 1877 Sibley, Iowa, U.S.
- Died: December 17, 1934 (aged 57) Des Moines, Iowa, U.S.
- Party: Republican
- Spouse: Carrie Lamoreaux (m. 1907)
- Children: 1
- Education: Morningside College; University of South Dakota (LLB)

William Lloyd Harding (October 3, 1877 – December 17, 1934) was an American politician who served as the 22nd governor of Iowa, from 1917 to 1921.

== Early life ==
William Lloyd Harding was born in Sibley, Iowa, on October 3, 1877, to Orlando B. and Emalyn (née Moyer) Harding, the fourth of nine children. They hailed from Pennsylvania. From 1897 to 1901, he attended Morningside College, and then went on to earn his law degree from the University of South Dakota in 1905.

He began the practicing law in Sioux City with the firm of Oliver, Harding & Oliver. He came to be a partner of James W. Kindig, later an Iowa Supreme Court justice.

He was married to Carrie Lamoreaux on January 9, 1907, and had a daughter named Barbara.

== Political career ==
=== Iowa House ===
Harding entered politics in 1906, serving as a Republican member of the Iowa House of Representatives, a position he held for six years. He was a ranking member of the Judiciary Committee and the Chairman of the Committee on Municipal Corporations.

=== Governorship ===
He also served as Iowa's lieutenant governor from 1913 to 1917 during the tenure of Republican governor George W. Clarke. Harding won the 1916 Republican gubernatorial nomination and then won the election in a landslide (winning 98 of 99 counties). He was sworn as governor on January 11, 1917 by Chief Justice Frank Gaynor.

==== Babel Proclamation ====
Harding was reelected to a second term in 1918 and thus was governor during the four years which partly coincided with World War I. During that time, there were "defense councils" in every state, following President Wilson's famous statement "the world must be made safe for democracy", and "millions of men and women of German birth and native sympathy live amongst us....Should there be any disloyalty it will be dealt with a firm hand of repression."

Harding was convinced that assimilation would heighten patriotism and felt there is a connection between communication and assimilation. He also claimed that any foreign language provided an opportunity for the enemy to scatter propaganda. Harding became the only governor in the United States to outlaw the public use of all foreign languages. On May 23, 1918 he addressed these issues in an edict whose title was the Babel Proclamation, stating:

FIRST. English should and must be the only medium of instruction in

public, private, denominational or other similar schools.

SECOND. Conversation in public places, on trains and over the telephone should be in the English language.

THIRD. All public addresses should be in the English language

FOURTH. Let those who can not speak or understand the English language conduct their religious worship in their homes.

In response to complaints from pastors, Harding stated that "there is no use in anyone wasting his time praying in languages other than English. God is listening only to the English tongue."

His hostility towards immigrants and foreign ethnic groups extended beyond Germans and included Iowans of Norwegian and Danish descent.

==== Other issues ====
During his tenure, rural schools were consolidated, prison labor was abolished and a survey to establish state historical sites was done. The State Board of Conservation was created, as well as the state park system. The state also passed federal amendments in support of Women's Suffarage and Prohibition.

=== Pardon scandal ===
==== Prelude ====
In November 1917, Ernest Rathbun, of Ida Grove, Iowa, raped a 17 year old girl on a country road. He was convicted on December 22, being sentenced to life in prison in Anamosa Men's Reformatory. Rathbun's attorney, George Clark, appealed the conviction to the Iowa Supreme Court. While the appeal worked its way through the system, Rathbun remained free on bail.

In late 1918, Thad Snell approached Rathbun's father and brother, offering a pardon in exchange for $5000. Clark traveled to Des Moines to discuss the pardon with Harding, but was rebuffed, saying he needed the recommendation of the County Attorney and Judge in the trial. Having these recommendations, to reduce the sentence from life to a specified number of years, Rathbun's father applied for a full pardon from Harding, leaving the papers with the governor's secretary, Charles Witt, due to Harding attending a national conference of governors in DC. When Harding returned, he signed the pardon, not having the pardon reviewed by the State Board of Parole or the Attorney General's office.

Harding sent the copies to Clark, who gave a copy to Rathbun, but told him to keep it secret. Clark then went to Rathbun's accomplice, Ray O'Meara, to offer the same deal. Due to the secrecy of the pardon, the Iowa Supreme Court was still deciding on the appeal from Rathbun. On December 16, 1918, the court rejected his appeal, making it possible for Rathbun to be taken into custody. On December 17, Clark filed the pardon in Ida Grove.

==== Investigations ====
===== Attorney General =====
Iowa Attorney General Horace M. Havner got a copy of the pardon. In the pardon appeal to Harding, it was said that Havner had approved a commutation in this case, which he had not. This began an investigation into the pardon and the actions of the people involved. Judge J. L. Kennedy was asked to be special prosecutor in this case to "bring proceedings against any persons found to have been guilty of wrongful acts", which he accepted.

The Iowa Homestead said of the pardon that it was "Iowa's most flagrant miscarriage of justice." It then contrasted Rathbun's pardon with the trials and public hangings of three African American soldiers at Camp Dodge found guilty of a similar crime.

Havner and Ida County Attorney Charles Macomb worked together to convene a grand jury to invalidate the pardon due to perjury, which the hearings then started on February 17. The governor said he was going to testify in front of the grand jury but did not testify initially, initially because it was thought he had an ear infection, but later his doctor confirmed it to be mumps and diabetes.

On February 20, while the governor was still in the hospital, Havner declared the pardon void, and directed the Ida County sheriff to take custody of Rathbun. Clark immediately filed a Habeas Corpus motion, asking why his pardoned client was now being held in the County Jail. Since Havner's grand jury and Clark's petition were a part of the same issue, the cases were merged.

On February 24, the governor did testify for an hour in front of the grand jury. After the testimony, Havner went to Rathbun to tell him of all the indictments against him, including bribery, obstruction of justice, and conspiracy against Rathbun, his father and brother, Ray O'Meara, a friend involved in a previous assault charge, and his attorney, George Clark. But if Rathbun would renounce the pardon and plead guilty to perjury, all other indictments would be dropped, making sure that his father and brother did not go to prison. Rathbun agreed to this. The grand jury worked to find the money trail between Rathbun's father and George Clark, but ended up returning the only indictment of perjury against Rathbun.

The district court judge brought the court back to session and agreed that the pardon was obtained in fraud by false statements and that the governor did not follow the policy to have the board of parole to review pardons. After his guilty plea, he was sentenced to 10 years in addition to his life sentence for rape and he was sent to Anamosa Men's Reformatory.

Judge Kennedy, Havner's special prosecutor, was infuriated by the squashing of indictments of Clark and the Rathbun's family.

===== Iowa House of Representatives =====
Ida County Representative William Seth Finch proposed a resolution in the Iowa House to find out what had occurred with this pardon. Attached was a letter with the signatures of 425 outraged citizens of Ida County.

On February 10, 1919, the Iowa House of Representatives Judiciary Committee was considering whether or not to look into the matter. Harding went to the Iowa House to offer his version of events and demanded that the legislature either charge him or clear his name. The House initiated a Special Investigative Committee but could find no evidence that Harding actually received any of the $5000. Clark testified that he used some of the money to pay for legal debts owed to Thad Snell, while Snell testified that it was for poker debts.

On March 21, a sworn affidavit from Rathbun's father detailed how he gave $5,000 to lawyer George Clark and this was supposed to be passed on to the governor.

On April 12, the Iowa House Judiciary voted in favor, 17-14, of impeachment. The dissenting 14 wrote that the governor acted in a hasty manner with regards to the pardon. The full house later agreed with the minority report and voted for censure.

On April 11, 1919, the Iowa House initiated impeachment proceedings against Harding. The next day, the House decided against impeachment and pursued censure.

==== Censure ====
Around 1 a.m. April 17, the House voted 70-34 for censure rather than impeachment. "No man in Iowa has had to submit to more severe political persecution than I,” Harding said in a statement, vowing to expose the conspiracy against him.

The House also voted 49-53, against censuring Attorney General Havner.

He did not run again in 1920.

== Later life ==
After leaving the Governor's Mansion, he joined Harding, Ruffcorn & Jones law firm in Des Moines.

In September 1934 while at a campaign event in Crawfordsville, Indiana, Harding suffered a serious heart attack, which lead to declining health.

Harding died of diabetes on December 17, 1934 in Des Moines. He then was entombed in a mausoleum at the Graceland Park Cemetery in Sioux City, Iowa.

Party political offices
Preceded by George W. Clarke	Republican nominee Governor of Iowa; 1916, 1918	Succeeded by Nathan E. Kendall
Political offices
Preceded by George W. Clarke	Lieutenant Governor of Iowa; 1913–1917	Succeeded by Ernest Robert Moore
Preceded by George W. Clarke	Governor of Iowa; January 11, 1917 – January 13, 1921	Succeeded by Nathan E. Kendall
