= List of governors of Iowa =

Governor of Iowa
- State seal

- Incumbent; Kim Reynolds since May 24, 2017
- Government of Iowa
- Style: The Honorable
- Residence: Terrace Hill
- Term length: Four years, no term limits
- Precursor: Governor of Iowa Territory
- Inaugural holder: Ansel Briggs
- Formation: December 3, 1846 (179 years ago)
- Succession: Line of succession
- Deputy: Lieutenant Governor of Iowa
- Salary: $130,000 (2022)
- Website: governor.iowa.gov

The governor of Iowa is the head of government of the U.S. state of Iowa. The governor is the head of the executive branch of the state government. The officeholder has the power to either approve or veto bills passed by the Iowa General Assembly, to convene the legislature, as well as to grant pardons, except in cases of treason and impeachment. The governor of Iowa is also the commander-in-chief of the state's military forces. The governor has the ability to sign executive orders, these have ranged from topics including the establishment of councils, committees and task forces, and appropriation reductions to prevent a state budget deficit.

There have been 41 individuals who held the position of Iowa governor, with two of those serving multiple distinct terms, Samuel J. Kirkwood and Terry Branstad. The current governor, Kim Reynolds, is the first woman to hold the position and was sworn in on May 24, 2017. The longest-serving is Terry Branstad, who served from 1983 to 1999 and then again from 2011 to 2017. He is the longest-serving governor in U.S. history, surpassing the previous record of 21 years set by George Clinton of New York. The shortest-serving was Robert D. Fulton, who served 16 days.

== List of governors ==
=== Territory of Iowa ===
Iowa Territory was formed on July 4, 1838, from Wisconsin Territory. It had four governors appointed by the president of the United States, though the first resigned days after he was confirmed by the Senate and before ever reaching the territory.

Governors of the Territory of Iowa
No.	Governor	Term in office (Note: The range given is from the date the governor was confirmed by the Senate, or appointed by the President during a Senate recess, to the date the governor's successor was confirmed, unless noted.)	Appointed by
1	Henry Atkinson (1782–1842)	June 13, 1838 – July 7, 1838 (25 days; resigned before taking office) (Note: Atkinson was nominated on June 12, 1838, and confirmed by the Senate on June 13. However, he declined the post; no source gives a date for when this happened, so his term is marked as having ended when his successor was confirmed.)	Martin Van Buren
2	Robert Lucas (Note: Lucas did not arrive for six weeks after the territory had been created; in the interim, territorial secretary William B. Conway acted as governor.) (1781–1853)	July 7, 1838 (Note: Lucas was nominated, and confirmed by the Senate, on July 7, 1838. He took office on August 15.) – March 25, 1841 (993 days; replaced) (Note: Lucas was out of the capital when Chambers arrived, and did not formally resign his commission until June 17, per a letter written to U.S. Secretary of State Daniel Webster.)	Martin Van Buren
3	John Chambers (1780–1852)	March 25, 1841 (Note: Chambers was appointed on March 25, 1841, during a Senate recess; nominated on June 17; and confirmed by the Senate on July 15. He took office on May 13. He was reappointed on July 2, 1844, during a Senate recess, and reconfirmed by the Senate on December 23.) – November 18, 1845 (1700 days; replaced)	William Henry Harrison
4	James Clarke (1812–1850)	November 8, 1845 (Note: Clarke was appointed during a Senate recess; McMullin & Walker say it was on November 8, 1845, but some sources say November 18. He was formally nominated on December 23, 1845, and confirmed by the Senate on February 3, 1846.) – December 3, 1846 (381 days; statehood)	James K. Polk

=== State of Iowa ===
The southeast portion of Iowa Territory was admitted to the Union as the State of Iowa on December 28, 1846. The first Constitution of Iowa, adopted in 1846, created the office of governor with a four-year term, with no specific start date. The 1857 constitution reduced this term to two years, but an amendment in 1972 increased this back to four years. The 1857 constitution also set the start of the term to the second Monday in the January following the election, which was moved one day later by a 1988 amendment.

The office of lieutenant governor was created in the 1857 constitution, elected for the same term as the governor. An amendment in 1988 specified that the lieutenant governor would be elected on the same ticket as the governor. Originally, if the office of governor were to become vacant, the Secretary of State of Iowa would act as governor,, and in 1857 this became the duty of the lieutenant governor. An amendment was passed in 2024 making it so that the lieutenant governor becomes governor, not simply acts, in such circumstances. There is no term limit on the number of terms a governor may serve.

Governors of the State of Iowa
No. (Note: There is no official numbering, and different governors have interpreted it differently, depending on if they give a new number when a governor has multiple distinct terms in office. This article includes numbering for every distinct term in office.)	Governor	Term in office	Party	Election	Lt. Governor (Note: The office of lieutenant governor was created in 1857.) (Note: Lieutenant governors represented the same party as their governor unless noted.)
1	Ansel Briggs (1806–1881)	December 3, 1846 – December 4, 1850 (1463 days; retired)	Democratic	1846	Office did not exist
2	Stephen P. Hempstead (1812–1883)	December 4, 1850 – December 9, 1854 (1467 days; retired) (Note: Hempstead instead ran unsuccessfully for the United States House of Representatives.)	Democratic	1850	Office did not exist
3	James W. Grimes (1816–1872)	December 9, 1854 – January 14, 1858 (1133 days; retired)	Whig	1854 (Note: The election schedule changed with this term, switching to odd-numbered years and shortening the term by nearly a year.)	Office did not exist
4	Ralph P. Lowe (1805–1883)	January 14, 1858 – January 11, 1860 (728 days; retired) (Note: Lowe was instead elected to the Iowa Supreme Court.)	Republican	1857 (Note: First term under the 1857 constitution, which shortened terms to two years.)	Oran Faville
5	Samuel J. Kirkwood (1813–1894)	January 11, 1860 – January 14, 1864 (1465 days; retired)	Republican	1859	Nicholas J. Rusch
5	Samuel J. Kirkwood (1813–1894)	January 11, 1860 – January 14, 1864 (1465 days; retired)	Republican	1861	John R. Needham
6	William M. Stone (1827–1893)	January 14, 1864 – January 16, 1868 (1464 days; retired)	Republican	1863	Enoch W. Eastman
6	William M. Stone (1827–1893)	January 14, 1864 – January 16, 1868 (1464 days; retired)	Republican	1865	Benjamin F. Gue
7	Samuel Merrill (1822–1899)	January 16, 1868 – January 11, 1872 (1457 days; retired)	Republican	1867	John Scott
7	Samuel Merrill (1822–1899)	January 16, 1868 – January 11, 1872 (1457 days; retired)	Republican	1869	Madison Miner Walden (resigned 1871) (Note: No source appears to know which date Walden resigned, just that it was after being elected to the United States House of Representatives for a term beginning March 4.)
7	Samuel Merrill (1822–1899)	January 16, 1868 – January 11, 1872 (1457 days; retired)	Republican	1869	Vacant
7	Samuel Merrill (1822–1899)	January 16, 1868 – January 11, 1872 (1457 days; retired)	Republican	1869	Henry C. Bulis (appointed September 13, 1871)
8	Cyrus C. Carpenter (1829–1898)	January 11, 1872 – January 13, 1876 (1464 days; retired)	Republican	1871	Henry C. Bulis (appointed September 13, 1871)
8	Cyrus C. Carpenter (1829–1898)	January 11, 1872 – January 13, 1876 (1464 days; retired)	Republican	1873	Joseph Dysart
9	Samuel J. Kirkwood (1813–1894)	January 13, 1876 – February 1, 1877 (386 days; resigned) (Note: Kirkwood resigned, having been elected to the United States Senate.)	Republican	1875	Joshua G. Newbold
10	Joshua G. Newbold (1830–1903)	February 1, 1877 – January 17, 1878 (351 days; retired)	Republican	Succeeded from lieutenant governor	Vacant
11	John H. Gear (1825–1900)	January 17, 1878 – January 12, 1882 (1457 days; retired)	Republican	1877	Frank T. Campbell
11	John H. Gear (1825–1900)	January 17, 1878 – January 12, 1882 (1457 days; retired)	Republican	1879	Frank T. Campbell
12	Buren R. Sherman (1836–1904)	January 12, 1882 – January 14, 1886 (1464 days; retired)	Republican	1881	Orlando H. Manning
12	Buren R. Sherman (1836–1904)	January 12, 1882 – January 14, 1886 (1464 days; retired)	Republican	1883	Orlando H. Manning
13	William Larrabee (1832–1912)	January 14, 1886 – February 27, 1890 (Note: Boies' inauguration was delayed for six weeks; the legislature was deadlocked in organizing itself, so Larrabee remained in office until Boies was certified.) (1506 days; retired)	Republican	1885	John A. T. Hull
13	William Larrabee (1832–1912)	January 14, 1886 – February 27, 1890 (1506 days; retired)	Republican	1887	John A. T. Hull
14	Horace Boies (1827–1923)	February 27, 1890 – January 11, 1894 (1415 days; lost election)	Democratic	1889	Alfred N. Poyneer (Note: Represented the Republican Party)
14	Horace Boies (1827–1923)	February 27, 1890 – January 11, 1894 (1415 days; lost election)	Democratic	1891	Samuel L. Bestow
15	Frank D. Jackson (1854–1938)	January 11, 1894 – January 16, 1896 (736 days; retired)	Republican	1893	Warren S. Dungan
16	Francis M. Drake (1830–1903)	January 16, 1896 – January 13, 1898 (729 days; retired)	Republican	1895	Matt Parrott
17	L. M. Shaw (1848–1932)	January 13, 1898 – January 16, 1902 (1464 days; retired)	Republican	1897	James C. Milliman
17	L. M. Shaw (1848–1932)	January 13, 1898 – January 16, 1902 (1464 days; retired)	Republican	1899	James C. Milliman
18	Albert B. Cummins (1850–1926)	January 16, 1902 – November 24, 1908 (2505 days; resigned) (Note: Cummins resigned, having been elected to the United States Senate; Cummins had already lost the Republican nomination for governor to Beryl F. Carroll.)	Republican	1901	John Herriott
18	Albert B. Cummins (1850–1926)	January 16, 1902 – November 24, 1908 (2505 days; resigned)	Republican	1903 (Note: The election schedule switched to even-numbered years after this election, which lengthened this term by nearly a year.)	John Herriott
18	Albert B. Cummins (1850–1926)	January 16, 1902 – November 24, 1908 (2505 days; resigned)	Republican	1906	Warren Garst
19	Warren Garst (1850–1924)	November 24, 1908 – January 14, 1909 (52 days; retired)	Republican	Succeeded from lieutenant governor	Vacant
20	Beryl F. Carroll (1860–1939)	January 14, 1909 – January 16, 1913 (1464 days; retired)	Republican	1908	George W. Clarke
20	Beryl F. Carroll (1860–1939)	January 14, 1909 – January 16, 1913 (1464 days; retired)	Republican	1910	George W. Clarke
21	George W. Clarke (1852–1936)	January 16, 1913 – January 11, 1917 (1457 days; retired)	Republican	1912	William L. Harding
21	George W. Clarke (1852–1936)	January 16, 1913 – January 11, 1917 (1457 days; retired)	Republican	1914	William L. Harding
22	William L. Harding (1877–1934)	January 11, 1917 – January 13, 1921 (1464 days; retired)	Republican	1916	Ernest Robert Moore
22	William L. Harding (1877–1934)	January 11, 1917 – January 13, 1921 (1464 days; retired)	Republican	1918	Ernest Robert Moore
23	Nathan E. Kendall (1868–1936)	January 13, 1921 – January 15, 1925 (1464 days; retired)	Republican	1920	John Hammill
23	Nathan E. Kendall (1868–1936)	January 13, 1921 – January 15, 1925 (1464 days; retired)	Republican	1922	John Hammill
24	John Hammill (1875–1936)	January 15, 1925 – January 15, 1931 (2192 days; retired) (Note: Hamill instead ran unsuccessfully for the Republican nomination for the United States Senate.)	Republican	1924	Clem F. Kimball (died September 10, 1928)
24	John Hammill (1875–1936)	January 15, 1925 – January 15, 1931 (2192 days; retired)	Republican	1926	Clem F. Kimball (died September 10, 1928)
24	John Hammill (1875–1936)	January 15, 1925 – January 15, 1931 (2192 days; retired)	Republican	1926	Vacant
24	John Hammill (1875–1936)	January 15, 1925 – January 15, 1931 (2192 days; retired)	Republican	1926	Arch W. McFarlane (appointed November 15, 1928)
24	John Hammill (1875–1936)	January 15, 1925 – January 15, 1931 (2192 days; retired)	Republican	1928	Arch W. McFarlane (appointed November 15, 1928)
25	Dan W. Turner (1877–1969)	January 15, 1931 – January 12, 1933 (729 days; lost election)	Republican	1930	Arch W. McFarlane (appointed November 15, 1928)
26	Clyde L. Herring (1879–1945)	January 12, 1933 – January 14, 1937 (1464 days; retired) (Note: Herring was instead elected to the United States Senate.)	Democratic	1932	Nelson G. Kraschel
26	Clyde L. Herring (1879–1945)	January 12, 1933 – January 14, 1937 (1464 days; retired)	Democratic	1934	Nelson G. Kraschel
27	Nelson G. Kraschel (1889–1957)	January 14, 1937 – January 12, 1939 (729 days; lost election)	Democratic	1936	John K. Valentine
28	George A. Wilson (1884–1953)	January 12, 1939 – January 14, 1943 (1464 days; retired) (Note: Wilson was instead elected to the United States Senate.)	Republican	1938	Bourke B. Hickenlooper
28	George A. Wilson (1884–1953)	January 12, 1939 – January 14, 1943 (1464 days; retired)	Republican	1940	Bourke B. Hickenlooper
29	Bourke B. Hickenlooper (1896–1971)	January 14, 1943 – January 11, 1945 (729 days; retired) (Note: Hickenlooper was instead elected to the United States Senate.)	Republican	1942	Robert D. Blue
30	Robert D. Blue (1898–1989)	January 11, 1945 – January 13, 1949 (1464 days; retired)	Republican	1944	Kenneth A. Evans
30	Robert D. Blue (1898–1989)	January 11, 1945 – January 13, 1949 (1464 days; retired)	Republican	1946	Kenneth A. Evans
31	William S. Beardsley (1901–1954)	January 13, 1949 – November 21, 1954 (2139 days; died in office)	Republican	1948	Kenneth A. Evans
31	William S. Beardsley (1901–1954)	January 13, 1949 – November 21, 1954 (2139 days; died in office)	Republican	1950	William H. Nicholas
31	William S. Beardsley (1901–1954)	January 13, 1949 – November 21, 1954 (2139 days; died in office)	Republican	1952	Leo Elthon
32	Leo Elthon (1898–1967)	November 21, 1954 – January 13, 1955 (54 days; retired)	Republican	Succeeded from lieutenant governor	Vacant
33	Leo Hoegh (1908–2000)	January 13, 1955 – January 17, 1957 (736 days; lost election)	Republican	1954	Leo Elthon
34	Herschel C. Loveless (1911–1989)	January 17, 1957 – January 12, 1961 (1457 days; retired) (Note: Loveless instead ran unsuccessfully for the United States Senate.)	Democratic	1956	William H. Nicholas
34	Herschel C. Loveless (1911–1989)	January 17, 1957 – January 12, 1961 (1457 days; retired)	Democratic	1958	Edward J. McManus
35	Norman A. Erbe (1919–2000)	January 12, 1961 – January 17, 1963 (736 days; lost election)	Republican	1960	W. L. Mooty (Note: Represented the Democratic Party)
36	Harold Hughes (1922–1996)	January 17, 1963 – January 1, 1969 (2177 days; resigned) (Note: Hughes resigned, having been elected to the United States Senate.)	Democratic	1962	W. L. Mooty
36	Harold Hughes (1922–1996)	January 17, 1963 – January 1, 1969 (2177 days; resigned)	Democratic	1964	Robert D. Fulton
36	Harold Hughes (1922–1996)	January 17, 1963 – January 1, 1969 (2177 days; resigned)	Democratic	1966	Robert D. Fulton
37	Robert D. Fulton (1929–2024)	January 1, 1969 – January 16, 1969 (16 days; retired)	Democratic	Succeeded from lieutenant governor	Vacant
38	Robert D. Ray (1928–2018)	January 16, 1969 – January 14, 1983 (5112 days; retired)	Republican	1968	Roger Jepsen
38	Robert D. Ray (1928–2018)	January 16, 1969 – January 14, 1983 (5112 days; retired)	Republican	1970	Roger Jepsen
38	Robert D. Ray (1928–2018)	January 16, 1969 – January 14, 1983 (5112 days; retired)	Republican	1972	Arthur Neu
38	Robert D. Ray (1928–2018)	January 16, 1969 – January 14, 1983 (5112 days; retired)	Republican	1974 (Note: First term under a 1972 constitutional amendment which lengthened terms to four years.)	Arthur Neu
38	Robert D. Ray (1928–2018)	January 16, 1969 – January 14, 1983 (5112 days; retired)	Republican	1978	Terry Branstad
39	Terry Branstad (b. 1946)	January 14, 1983 – January 15, 1999 (5846 days; retired)	Republican	1982	Robert T. Anderson
39	Terry Branstad (b. 1946)	January 14, 1983 – January 15, 1999 (5846 days; retired)	Republican	1986	Jo Ann Zimmerman
39	Terry Branstad (b. 1946)	January 14, 1983 – January 15, 1999 (5846 days; retired)	Republican	1990	Joy Corning
39	Terry Branstad (b. 1946)	January 14, 1983 – January 15, 1999 (5846 days; retired)	Republican	1994	Joy Corning
40	Tom Vilsack (b. 1950)	January 15, 1999 – January 12, 2007 (2920 days; retired)	Democratic	1998	Sally Pederson
40	Tom Vilsack (b. 1950)	January 15, 1999 – January 12, 2007 (2920 days; retired)	Democratic	2002	Sally Pederson
41	Chet Culver (b. 1966)	January 12, 2007 – January 14, 2011 (1464 days; lost election)	Democratic	2006	Patty Judge
42	Terry Branstad (b. 1946)	January 14, 2011 – May 24, 2017 (2323 days; resigned) (Note: Branstad resigned, having been confirmed as United States Ambassador to China.)	Republican	2010	Kim Reynolds
42	Terry Branstad (b. 1946)	January 14, 2011 – May 24, 2017 (2323 days; resigned)	Republican	2014	Kim Reynolds
43	Kim Reynolds (b. 1959)	May 24, 2017 – Incumbent (Note: Reynolds' second full term began on January 13, 2023, and will expire on January 15, 2027; she is not seeking reelection.) (in office 3470 days)	Republican	Succeeded from lieutenant governor	Vacant
43	Kim Reynolds (b. 1959)	May 24, 2017 – Incumbent (in office 3470 days)	Republican	Succeeded from lieutenant governor	Adam Gregg (appointed May 25, 2017) (resigned September 3, 2024)
43	Kim Reynolds (b. 1959)	May 24, 2017 – Incumbent (in office 3470 days)	Republican	2018	Adam Gregg (appointed May 25, 2017) (resigned September 3, 2024)
43	Kim Reynolds (b. 1959)	May 24, 2017 – Incumbent (in office 3470 days)	Republican	2022	Adam Gregg (appointed May 25, 2017) (resigned September 3, 2024)
43	Kim Reynolds (b. 1959)	May 24, 2017 – Incumbent (in office 3470 days)	Republican	2022	Vacant
43	Kim Reynolds (b. 1959)	May 24, 2017 – Incumbent (in office 3470 days)	Republican	2022	Chris Cournoyer (appointed December 16, 2024)
44	Rob Sand (b. 1982)	Governor-elect takes office January 15, 2027	Democratic	2026	Dave Muhlbauer

== Timeline ==
Timeline of Iowa governors

== See also ==
- Gubernatorial lines of succession in the United States § Iowa
- List of lieutenant governors of Iowa
- List of Iowa General Assemblies

== Sources ==
- "Former Iowa Governors". National Governors Association.
- "Iowa Constitution". State Democracy Research Initiative. University of Wisconsin Law School.
- Dubin, Michael J. (2003). United States Gubernatorial Elections, 1776–1860: The Official Results by State and County. McFarland. ISBN 0-7864-1439-1 – via Internet Archive.
- Glashan, Roy R. (1979). American Governors and Gubernatorial Elections, 1775-1978. Meckler Books. ISBN 0-7201-1511-6 – via Internet Archive.
- Kallenbach, Joseph E.; Kallenbach, Jessamine S. (1977). American State Governors, 1776-1976. Oceana Publications. ISBN 978-0-379-00665-0 – via Internet Archive.
- McMullin, Thomas A.; Walker, David (1984). Biographical Directory of American Territorial Governors. Meckler Publishing. ISBN 0-930466-11-X – via Internet Archive.
- Mullaney, Marie Marmo (1994). Biographical Directory of the Governors of the United States, 1988–1994. Greenwood Publishing Group. ISBN 0-313-28312-5 – via Internet Archive.
- Sobel, Robert; Raimo, John (1978). Biographical Directory of the Governors of the United States, 1789-1978. Vol. 2. Meckler Books. ISBN 0-930466-01-2 – via Internet Archive.
- Thorpe, Francis Newton, ed. (1909). The Federal and State Constitutions, Colonial Charters, and Other Organic Laws of the States, Territories, and Colonies Now or Heretofore Forming the United States of America. Vol. 2. United States Government Publishing Office – via Internet Archive.
