= L. W. Housel =

American politician (1873–1935)

Member of the Connecticut House of Representatives from New Haven
- In office January 9, 1901 – June 1902 Serving with Jerome F. Donovan
- Preceded by: Alfred W. Forbes
- Succeeded by: Theodore Gruener

Personal details
- Born: Lorenzo William Housel; December 30, 1873 Van Ettenville, New York, U.S.
- Died: September 15, 1935 (aged 61) Rochester, Minnesota, U.S.
- Party: Democratic
- Spouse: Almira Harriet Finch (m. 1902)
- Education: Yale University (BA, LLB)
- Occupation: Lawyer; journalist; politician

Lorenzo William Housel (December 30, 1873 – September 15, 1935) was a Connecticut state legislator who later ran for Congress and statewide office in Iowa. Running as a Democrat in an era in which Republicans dominated Iowa politics, Housel was unsuccessful in each of his Iowa races.

== Personal background ==
L.W. Housel was born in VanEttenville, New York, to a veteran of the Civil War and his wife. The better portion of his young life was spent in Nichols, New York. After attending rural schools in New York and working on farms and in lumber camps, he was admitted to Yale University. While at Yale, he worked his way through college as a newspaper reporter for the New Haven Journal-Courier. After receiving his undergraduate degree from Yale in 1897, he then attended Yale Law School, receiving his law degree in 1900.

== Connecticut General Assembly ==
In November of the same year in which Housel graduated from law school, he was elected as a Democrat to the Connecticut House of Representatives, where he represented a district in New Haven. He was the youngest member of the House. In his first term as representative, he drafted and presented the bill to limit the length of the working day to eight hours. Although Democratic House members were outnumbered four to one by Republicans, his bill received good support, but did not pass.

== Relocation to Iowa ==
Because of long delayed plans he had made with his childhood sweetheart, plans that were now at least four years delayed, he resigned his seat in the Connecticut Legislature in early June 1902 and traveled to his childhood home of Nichols, New York to marry Almira Harriet "Mina" Finch, daughter of Iowa lawyer and state senator Parley Finch. The 'plans' with Mina included that he remove to Humboldt, Iowa, and to enter into private practice with his new father-in-law. Of course, the opportunity to advance his political career in Iowa as a Democrat who was the son-in-law of a Republican Iowa Legislator in a state that nearly always voted Republican at the time also was compelling.

Housel and his wife became the parents of Delphine Housel Christensen and William Parley Housel.

== Iowa elections ==
For Housel's first thirty years in Iowa (from 1902 to 1932), Republicans dominated the General Assembly and governorship, and the Iowa congressional delegation. Humboldt County and the congressional district in which it was then located (Iowa's 10th congressional district) were overwhelmingly Republican. Nevertheless, Housel and his family remained in Humboldt and he repeatedly ran for elective office as a Democrat. Three times he ran for election to the Iowa House of Representatives (in 1910, 1912, and 1920), but was defeated each time in the general election. In 1914, he ran in the Democratic primary for Congress for the Tenth District, but was defeated by Denis M. Kelleher of more populous Fort Dodge, who was in turn defeated in the general election by Republican Frank P. Woods.

In 1924 he received the Democratic nomination for Lieutenant Governor of Iowa, but was defeated by Republican Clem Kimball in the general election.

In 1928, he ran unopposed for the Democratic nomination for Governor of Iowa. In the general election he ran against Republican Governor John Hammill, who was then seeking his third term. With Iowa native Herbert Hoover at the top of the Republican ticket and the Great Depression a year away, Republicans swept all major races, including the governor's race.

For health reasons, Housel did not enter any races in 1930, but in 1932 ran again for the Democratic nomination for Governor. He ran on a conservative platform, urging that the state cut spending and programs by up to 25 percent in order to allow a general cut in all taxes as a form of relief from the Depression. That year would become the best year yet for Democratic candidates in Iowa, but Housel's candidacy did not survive the primary in a year when many Democrats were hopeful of a chance to defeat the Republicans. He was defeated in the June primary by future Governor and U.S. Senator Clyde L. Herring.

== Retirement ==
In 1931, Housel and his wife were traveling in Managua, Nicaragua when the 1931 Nicaragua earthquake destroyed their hotel. He was on the road at the time obtaining tickets for their air travel back to the United States, but upon his return trip, the vehicle he was traveling in was flipped by the earthquake. All aboard the vehicle walked away, but he was then forced to find his own way back to the hotel. Meanwhile, back at the hotel, the quick thinking of the hotel staff allowed at least his wife, Mina, to escape uninjured and spend the next night or so in the square adjacent to the hotel. For a very short time, Lorenzo Housel was the "senior" contact of the United States within the earthquake zone in Nicaragua. This did not last for long however, because their return to Humboldt, Iowa was overdue. When not traveling the world, they resided in Brownsville, Texas in winter and Humboldt for the rest of the year. He died in Rochester, Minnesota in September 1935 following a lingering illness.

Party political offices
Preceded by Alex R. Miller	Democratic nominee for Governor of Iowa; 1928	Succeeded by Fred P. Hagemann
