= Governor Hickenlooper =

Governor Hickenlooper may refer to:

- Bourke B. Hickenlooper (1896–1971), 29th Governor of Iowa
- John Hickenlooper (born 1952), 42nd Governor of Colorado
