= 1950 United States Senate election in Iowa =

- November 7, 1950
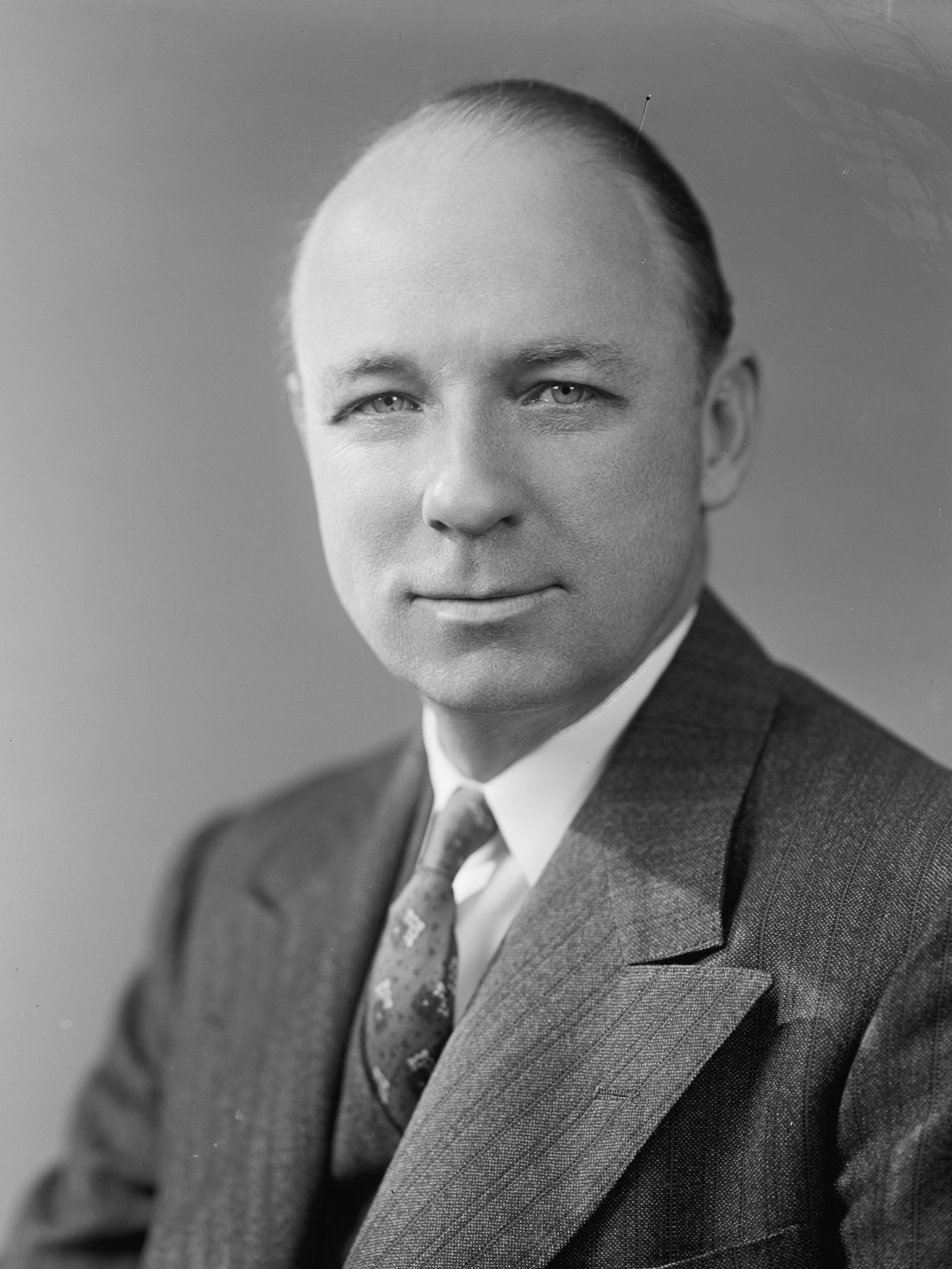

Nominee	Bourke B. Hickenlooper	Albert J. Loveland
Party	Republican	Democratic
Popular vote	470,613	383,766
Percentage	54.82%	44.70%
- County results Hickenlooper: 50–60% 60–70% Loveland: 40–50% 50–60%
U.S. senator before election
Bourke B. Hickenlooper
Republican
Elected U.S. Senator
Bourke B. Hickenlooper
Republican

The 1950 United States Senate election in Iowa took place on November 7, 1950. Incumbent Republican Senator Bourke B. Hickenlooper was re-elected to a second term in office over Democratic U.S. Undersecretary of Agriculture Albert J. Loveland.

Primary elections were held on June 5. Senator Hickenlooper faced nominal opposition for re-nomination in the Republican primary, while Loveland won a plurality over a five-man Democratic field including former Governor Nelson G. Kraschel and former U.S. Representative Otha Wearin.

== Republican primary ==
=== Candidates ===
- Bourke B. Hickenlooper, incumbent Senator since 1945
- Harry B. Thompson
- Earl F. Wisdom

=== Results ===
1950 Republican U.S. Senate primary
Party	Candidate	Votes	%
Republican	Bourke B. Hickenlooper (incumbent)	193,337	75.28%
Republican	Earl F. Wisdom	38,001	14.80%
Republican	Harry B. Thompson	25,480	9.92%
Total votes		256,818	100.00%

== Democratic primary ==
=== Candidates ===
- Nelson G. Kraschel, former Governor of Iowa (1937–1939)
- Albert J. Loveland, U.S. Undersecretary of Agriculture
- Alvin P. Meyer
- Ernest J. Seemann, perennial candidate
- W.M. Shaw, candidate for U.S. House in 1938
- Otha Wearin, former U.S. Representative from Glenwood (1933–1939)

=== Results ===
1950 Democratic U.S. Senate primary
Party	Candidate	Votes	%
Democratic	Albert J. Loveland	38,150	38.51%
Democratic	Nelson G. Kraschel	31,097	31.39%
Democratic	Otha Wearin	11,778	11.89%
Democratic	Alvin P. Meyer	9,341	9.43%
Democratic	W.M. Shaw	4,479	4.52%
Democratic	Ernest J. Seemann	4,225	4.27%
Total votes		99,070	100.00%

After losing the primary, Seemann entered the general election as a States' Rights candidate.

== General election ==
=== Candidates ===
- Bourke B. Hickenlooper, incumbent Senator since 1945 (Republican)
- Z. Everett Kellum (Prohibition)
- Albert J. Loveland, United States Undersecretary of Agriculture (Democratic)
- Leslie O. Ludwig (Socialist Labor)
- Ernest J. Seemann, perennial candidate (States' Rights)

=== Results ===
1950 U.S. Senate election in Iowa
Party	Candidate	Votes	%	±%
Republican	Bourke B. Hickenlooper (incumbent)	470,613	54.82%	▲3.54
Democratic	Albert J. Loveland	383,766	44.70%	▼3.67
Prohibition	Z. Everett Kellum	3,273	0.38%	▲0.11
Dixiecrat	Ernest J. Seemann	571	0.07%	N/A
Socialist Labor	Leslie O. Ludwig	300	0.04%	N/A
Total votes		858,523	100.00%	

== See also ==
- 1950 United States Senate elections
