= Albert J. Loveland =

American politician

United States Under Secretary of Agriculture
- In office 1948 – March 27, 1950

Personal details
- Born: Albert Joel Loveland; May 9, 1893 East of Janesville, Iowa, U.S.
- Died: August 7, 1961 (aged 68) Rochester, Minnesota, U.S.
- Party: Democratic Party
- Spouse: Vivian Slaughter (1914–1961)
- Children: Betty, Russell, Florence, Ronald
- Education: College of Commerce

Albert Joel "A. J." Loveland (May 9, 1893 – August 7, 1961), served as Under-Secretary of Agriculture, now known as United States Deputy Secretary of Agriculture, under President Harry S. Truman. Loveland was appointed to the post by Truman in 1948 and served until March 27, 1950, to run for congress. A member of the Democratic Party, Loveland ran unsuccessfully against Republican Bourke Blakemore Hickenlooper for the U.S. Senate election in 1950.

Loveland's first public office was as a member of the Janesville School Board. He was a graduate of Janesville High School and the College of Commerce in Waterloo, Iowa. He was one of the founding members of the Agricultural Adjustment Administration during the Great Depression, later serving chairman of that organization in Iowa. From 1941 until 1945, Loveland was the chairman of the Iowa State War Board for Agriculture.

== Electoral history ==
United States Senate from Iowa, 1950
Party	Candidate	Votes	%
Republican	Bourke B. Hickenlooper (inc.)	470,613	54.82
Democratic	Albert J. Loveland	383,766	44.70
Independent	Z. Everett Kellum	3,273	0.38
Independent	Ernest J. Seemann	571	0.07
Independent	Leslie O. Ludwig	300	0.04
Total votes		858,523	100

== Personal life ==
Born on the family farm just east of Janesville, Iowa, Loveland was the oldest of seven children born to Wilbert B. and Cora Loveland, and the grandson of Dr. Joel Loveland. Albert J. Loveland was a third-generation farmer, carrying on his father's herd of registered Holstein cattle.

Married on July 15, 1914, to Vivian Slaughter, Albert J. Loveland was the father of four children. At the time of his death, he still resided on the family farm where he was born. Loveland is buried at Oakland Cemetery near Janesville.

Party political offices
Preceded by Guy Gillette	Democratic nominee for U.S. Senator from Iowa (Class 3); 1950	Succeeded by R. M. Evans
