= George A. Wilson =

American politician (1884-1953)

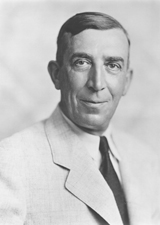

United States Senator from Iowa
- In office January 14, 1943 – January 3, 1949
- Preceded by: Clyde L. Herring
- Succeeded by: Guy Gillette

28th Governor of Iowa
- In office January 12, 1939 – January 14, 1943
- Lieutenant: Bourke B. Hickenlooper
- Preceded by: Nelson G. Kraschel
- Succeeded by: Bourke B. Hickenlooper

Member of the Iowa Senate from the 30th district
- In office January 10, 1927 – December 20, 1936
- Preceded by: William J. Goodwin
- Succeeded by: James J. Gillespie

Polk County District Court Judge
- In office December 1917 – January 1, 1920
- Preceded by: Charles Ashman Dudley
- Succeeded by: J.D. Wallinford

Polk County Attorney
- In office 1915–1916
- Preceded by: Thomas J. Guthrie

Assistant Polk County Attorney
- In office 1912–1914

Personal details
- Born: George Allison Wilson; April 1, 1884 Menlo, Iowa, U.S.
- Died: September 8, 1953 (aged 69) Des Moines, Iowa, U.S.
- Party: Republican
- Spouse: Mildred E. Zehner (m. 1921)
- Children: 4
- Education: Grinnell College; University of Iowa (LLB)

George Allison Wilson (April 1, 1884 – September 8, 1953) was an American politician and lawyer. He was a United States senator and 28th governor of Iowa.

== Personal background ==
Born on a farm near Menlo, Iowa, last child of James Henderson Wilson, a Civil War veteran and Iowa State Railroad Commissioner, and Martha Green (Varley) Wilson. His father died in November 1916 while in office as Railroad Commissioner while visiting Washington, D.C. He attended rural schools, then Grinnell College in Grinnell, Iowa and finally graduated from the University of Iowa College of Law at Iowa City in 1907. He was admitted to the bar in 1907. He then commenced practice in Des Moines.

On December 8, 1921, he married Mildred E. Zehner and they had 4 children, 3 sons served in World War II.

== Political career ==
=== Local Politics ===
Wilson's initial exposure to the Iowa Senate happened in 1898, aged just 14, when he got a job as a Page. He would then go on to be an Assistant Secretary of the Senate from 1906 to 1909 and then Secretary of the Senate in 1911.

He was assistant county attorney of Polk County, Iowa from 1912 to 1914 and the Polk County Attorney from 1915 to 1916.

Judge Charles Dudley, of the Polk County District Court, was in the middle of reading jury instructions when he was taken ill by a complication of kidney disease, which ultimately lead to his death. Governor Harding appointed Wilson to fill the vacant seat for the remainder of Dudley's term. He was then elected as district judge in 1918 and stayed on the bench until his resignation on January 1, 1921, to resume practicing law.

He later was a member of the Iowa Senate from 1927 to 1936.

=== Governor of Iowa ===
In 1936, Iowa's governor, Democrat Clyde Herring, ran for the U.S. Senate instead of running for re-election. Wilson won the Republican primary by 20,000 votes. He was just barely defeated by Democrat Nelson G. Kraschel in the general election by 2,431 votes out of over one million cast.

In 1938, Wilson again ran against Kraschel, with the opposite result. Wilson won by 59,282 votes.

Wilson was then re-elected as governor in 1940, winning by 66,539 votes in the general election over Democrat John Valentine after overcoming a surprisingly strong challenge in the Republican primary from future Congressman H.R. Gross.

At the beginning of his tenure, he eliminated the state Board of Control because of their failure and neglect toward the state's 15 prisons. New Departments created were a Tax Commission, Department of Public Safety, and a committee regarding State Industry and Defense. Also during his tenure, social welfare was reconstructed and a teacher tenure bill was passed. Additionally, the reapportionment of the State Legislature was authorized.

=== United States Senator ===
Instead of running for a third term in 1942, Wilson decided to challenge Senator Clyde L. Herring in the 1942 United States Senate race. He won by 115,189 votes, and served in the Senate from January 14, 1943, to January 3, 1949. His Senate committees included the Small Business Committee, the Armed Services Committee and the Agriculture Committee.

In 1948, former U.S. Senator Guy M. Gillette, unseated in his own bid for re-election in 1944, ran against Wilson in the general election. Wilson was expected to win. However, in a year in which President Harry S. Truman and many other Democrats surprised pundits, Gillette defeated Wilson by 162,448 votes.

== Later life ==
After leaving the Senate in early 1949, Wilson returned to practicing law with his son, George.

In 1964, the Wilson Island State Recreation Area was named after him.

Wilson died at Mercy Hospital in Des Moines during a surgery for a malignant throat tumor in 1953 and was buried at Glendale Cemetery in Des Moines.

Party political offices
Preceded by Dan W. Turner	Republican nominee Governor of Iowa; 1936, 1938, 1940	Succeeded by Bourke B. Hickenlooper
Preceded by Lester J. Dickinson	Republican nominee for United States Senator from Iowa (Class 2); 1942, 1948	Succeeded by Thomas E. Martin
Political offices
Preceded by Nelson G. Kraschel	Governor of Iowa; 1939–1943	Succeeded by Bourke B. Hickenlooper
U.S. Senate
Preceded by Clyde L. Herring	U.S. senator (Class 2) from Iowa; 1943–1949; Served alongside: Guy Mark Gillette, Bourke Hickenlooper	Succeeded by Guy Mark Gillette
