= 1940 Iowa gubernatorial election =

- November 7, 1940
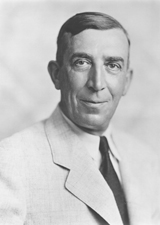

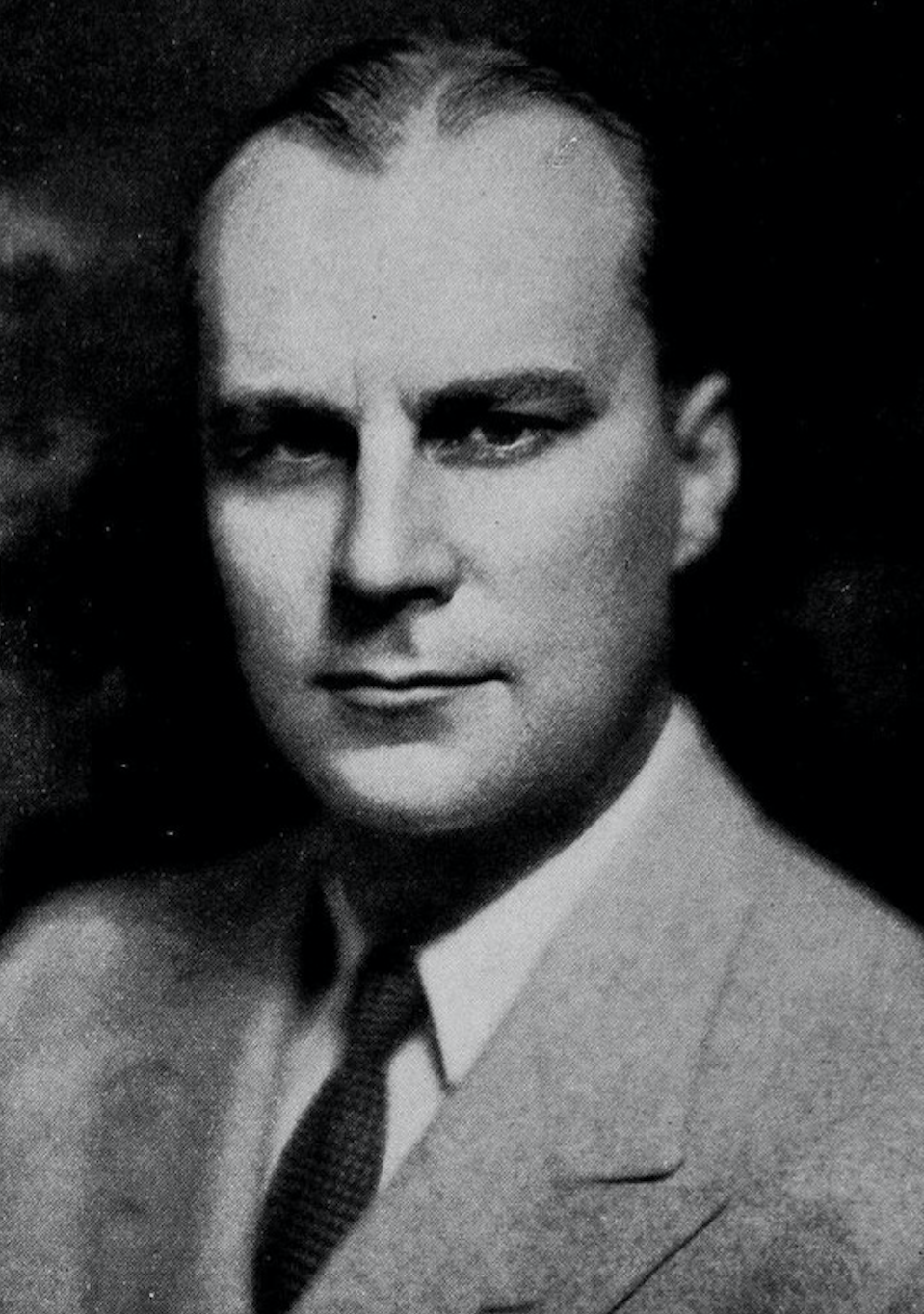
Nominee	George A. Wilson	John K. Valentine
Party	Republican	Democratic
Popular vote	620,480	553,941
Percentage	52.72%	47.07%
- County results Wilson: 40–50% 50–60% 60–70% Valentine: 50–60%
Governor before election
George A. Wilson
Republican
Elected Governor
George A. Wilson
Republican

The 1940 Iowa gubernatorial election was held on November 5, 1940. Incumbent Republican George A. Wilson defeated Democratic nominee John K. Valentine with 52.72% of the vote.

== Primary elections ==
Primary elections were held on June 3, 1940.

=== Democratic primary ===
==== Candidates ====
- John K. Valentine, former Lieutenant Governor
- Edward Breen, State Senator

==== Results ====
Democratic primary results
Party	Candidate	Votes	%
Democratic	John K. Valentine	70,233	57.88
Democratic	Edward Breen	51,112	42.12
Total votes		121,345	100.00

=== Republican primary ===
==== Candidates ====
- George A. Wilson, incumbent Governor
- H. R. Gross, Newspaper reporter
- Irving H. Knudson, former State Senator

==== Results ====
Republican primary results
Party	Candidate	Votes	%
Republican	George A. Wilson (incumbent)	165,176	49.66
Republican	H. R. Gross	146,395	44.01
Republican	Irving H. Knudson	21,039	6.33
Total votes		332,610	100.00

== General election ==
=== Candidates ===
Major party candidates

- George A. Wilson, Republican
- John K. Valentine, Democratic

Other candidates

- M. M. Heptonstall, Prohibition
- Charles Speck, Communist

=== Results ===
1940 Iowa gubernatorial election
Party	Candidate	Votes	%	±%
Republican	George A. Wilson (incumbent)	620,480	52.72%	
Democratic	John K. Valentine	553,941	47.07%	
Prohibition	M. M. Heptonstall	1,289	0.11%	
Communist	Charles Speck	1,230	0.11%	
Majority		66,539		
Turnout				
Republican hold		Swing		
