= 1942 Iowa gubernatorial election =

- November 3, 1942
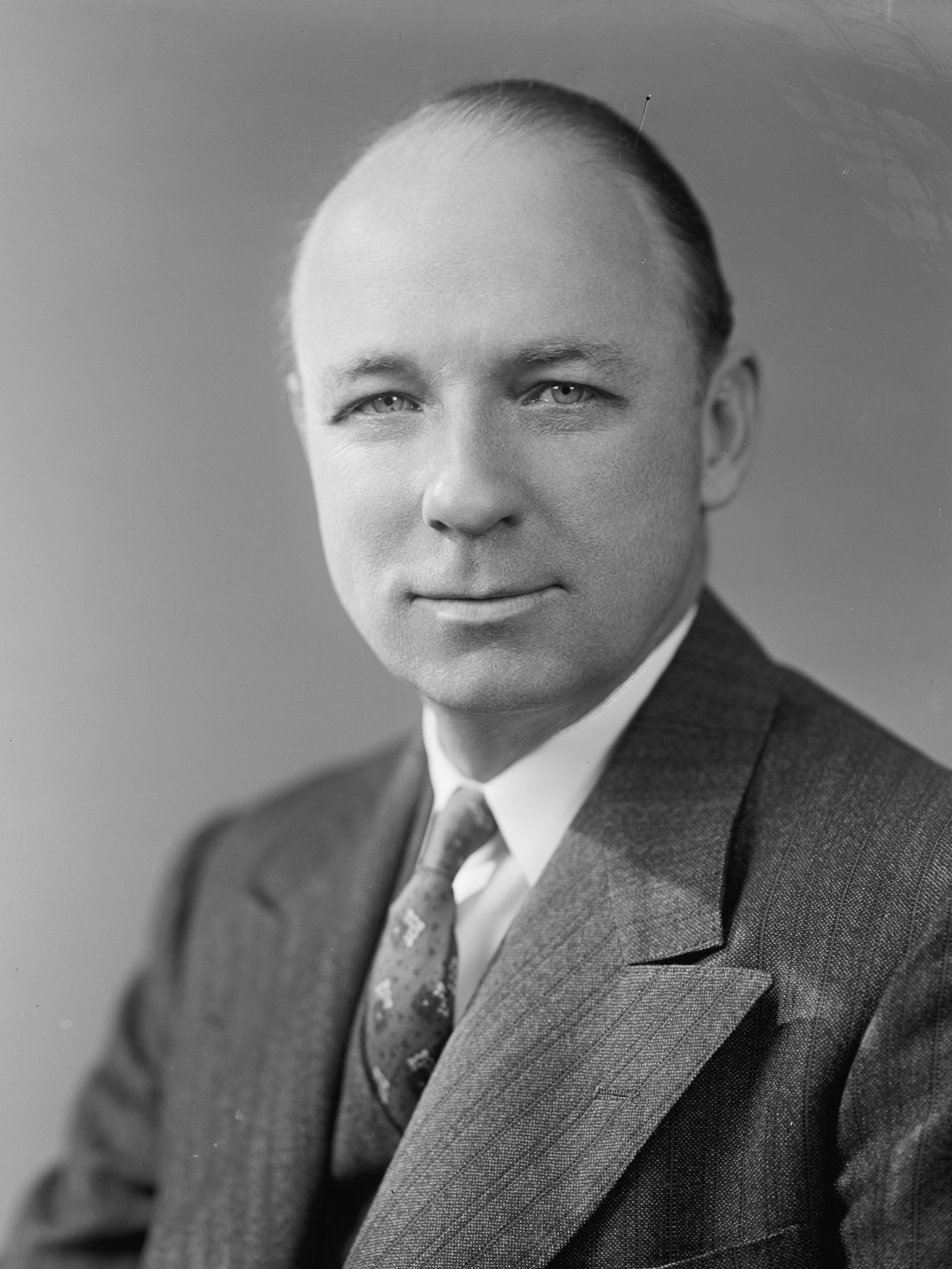

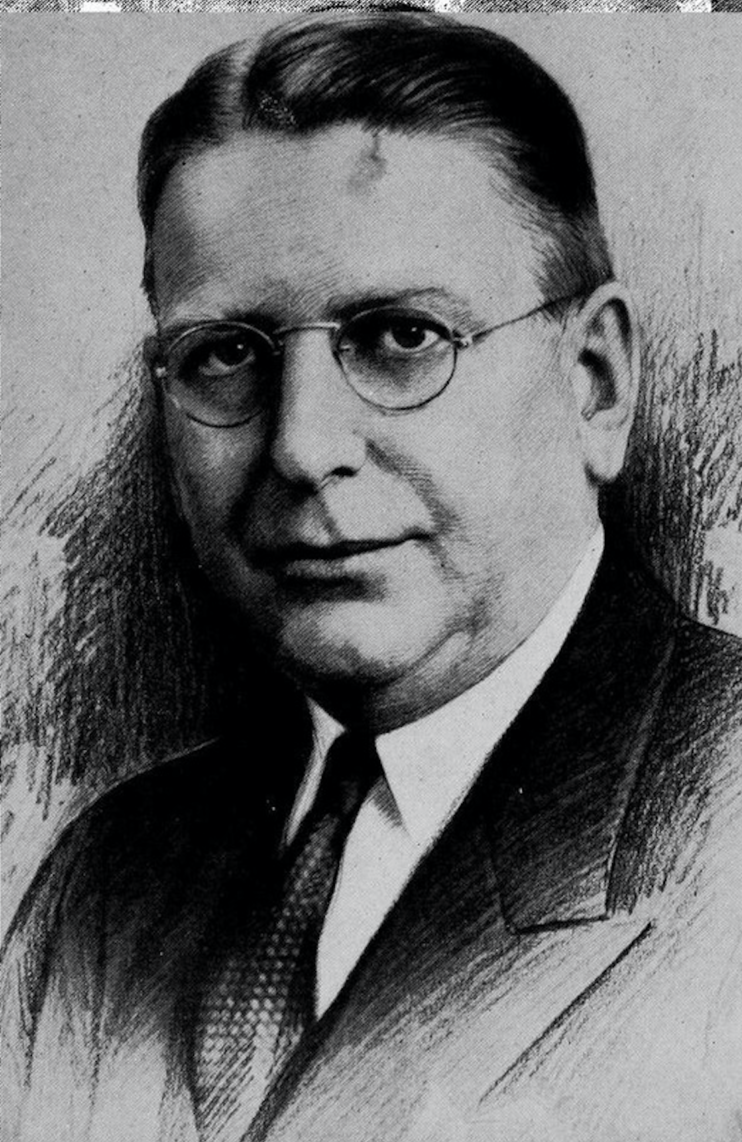
Nominee	Bourke B. Hickenlooper	Nelson G. Kraschel
Party	Republican	Democratic
Popular vote	438,547	258,310
Percentage	62.75%	36.96%
- County results Hickenlooper: 50–60% 60–70% 70–80% Kraschel: 50–60%
Governor before election
George A. Wilson
Republican
Elected Governor
Bourke B. Hickenlooper
Republican

The 1942 Iowa gubernatorial election was held on November 3, 1942. Republican nominee Bourke B. Hickenlooper defeated Democratic nominee Nelson G. Kraschel with 62.75% of the vote.

== Primary elections ==
Primary elections were held on June 1, 1942.

=== Democratic primary ===
==== Candidates ====
- Nelson G. Kraschel, former Governor
- Earl Miller
- Albert Earl Augustine, State Senator

==== Results ====
Democratic primary results
Party	Candidate	Votes	%
Democratic	Nelson G. Kraschel	50,172	
Democratic	Earl Miller	45,262	
Democratic	A. E. Augustine	28,293	
Total votes			

=== Republican primary ===
==== Candidates ====
- Bourke B. Hickenlooper, incumbent Lieutenant Governor

==== Results ====
Republican primary results
Party	Candidate	Votes	%
Republican	Bourke B. Hickenlooper	186,211	100.00
Total votes		186,211	100.00

== General election ==
=== Candidates ===
Major party candidates

- Bourke B. Hickenlooper, Republican
- Nelson G. Kraschel, Democratic

Other candidates

- Ward Hall, Prohibition
- F. M. Briggs, Independent

=== Results ===
1942 Iowa gubernatorial election
Party	Candidate	Votes	%	±%
Republican	Bourke B. Hickenlooper	438,547	62.75%	
Democratic	Nelson G. Kraschel	258,310	36.96%	
Prohibition	Ward Hall	1,483	0.21%	
Independent	F. M. Briggs	590	0.08%	
Majority		180,237		
Turnout				
Republican hold		Swing		
