= Parley Finch =

American politician (1844–1927)

Member of the Iowa Senate from the 50th district
- In office January 10, 1898 – January 12, 1902
- Preceded by: George W. Henderson
- Succeeded by: Edward King Winne

Member of the Iowa House of Representatives from the 76th district
- In office January 7, 1894 – January 9, 1898
- Preceded by: Frank E. Carpenter
- Succeeded by: Merton E. DeWolf

Personal details
- Born: Parley Finch; September 24, 1844 Windham, Pennsylvania, U.S.
- Died: February 16, 1927 (aged 82) Fort Dodge, Iowa, U.S.
- Party: Republican
- Spouse: Mary Delphine Waite (m. 1869; died 1882)

Parley Finch (September 24, 1844 – February 16, 1927) was an American politician who served in both chambers of the Iowa General Assembly as a member of the Republican Party, representing Iowa's 76th House of Representatives district in the Iowa House of Representatives from 1894 and 1898 and Iowa's 50th Senate district in the Iowa Senate from 1898 to 1902.

== Early life ==
Parley Finch was born in Windham, Pennsylvania, on September 24, 1844, to parents James and Lucia Johnson Finch. He attended the common schools of Bradford County. When not assisting on the family farm, Finch taught school for nine years from 1862, in Pennsylvania and later New York. Finch also read law with his brother Ira. In April 1871 Finch moved to Iowa, finished reading law with Oren Miller in Waterloo, and joined the Iowa bar by September of the same year. Between 1872 and 1912, Finch practiced law in Humboldt. He invested in real estate around the Humboldt area, and led the Humboldt State Bank as president.

== Political career ==
Politically, Finch was affiliated with the Republican Party. Finch's start in local politics included stints on Humboldt's city council and three terms as the city's mayor. He was elected to two terms on the Iowa House of Representatives in 1893 and 1895, both for District 76. Finch then served a single four-year term on the Iowa Senate for District 50 until 1902. As a legislator, Finch became known for his for expertise in and contributions to revisions of the Code of Iowa.

== Later life and family ==
Finch was married to Nichols, New York native Mary Delphine Waite from 1869 to her death in 1882. Finch's daughter, Almira Harriet "Mina" Finch, married Connecticut House of Representatives member L. W. Housel in 1902. Housel resigned his political office, moved to Humboldt per an agreement with Almira to practice law alongside her father, and contested several of Iowa's statewide offices as a Democratic candidate. Parley Finch died on February 16, 1927, at Mercy Hospital in Fort Dodge.
