= 1956 United States Senate election in Iowa =

Election in a U.S. state

- November 6, 1956
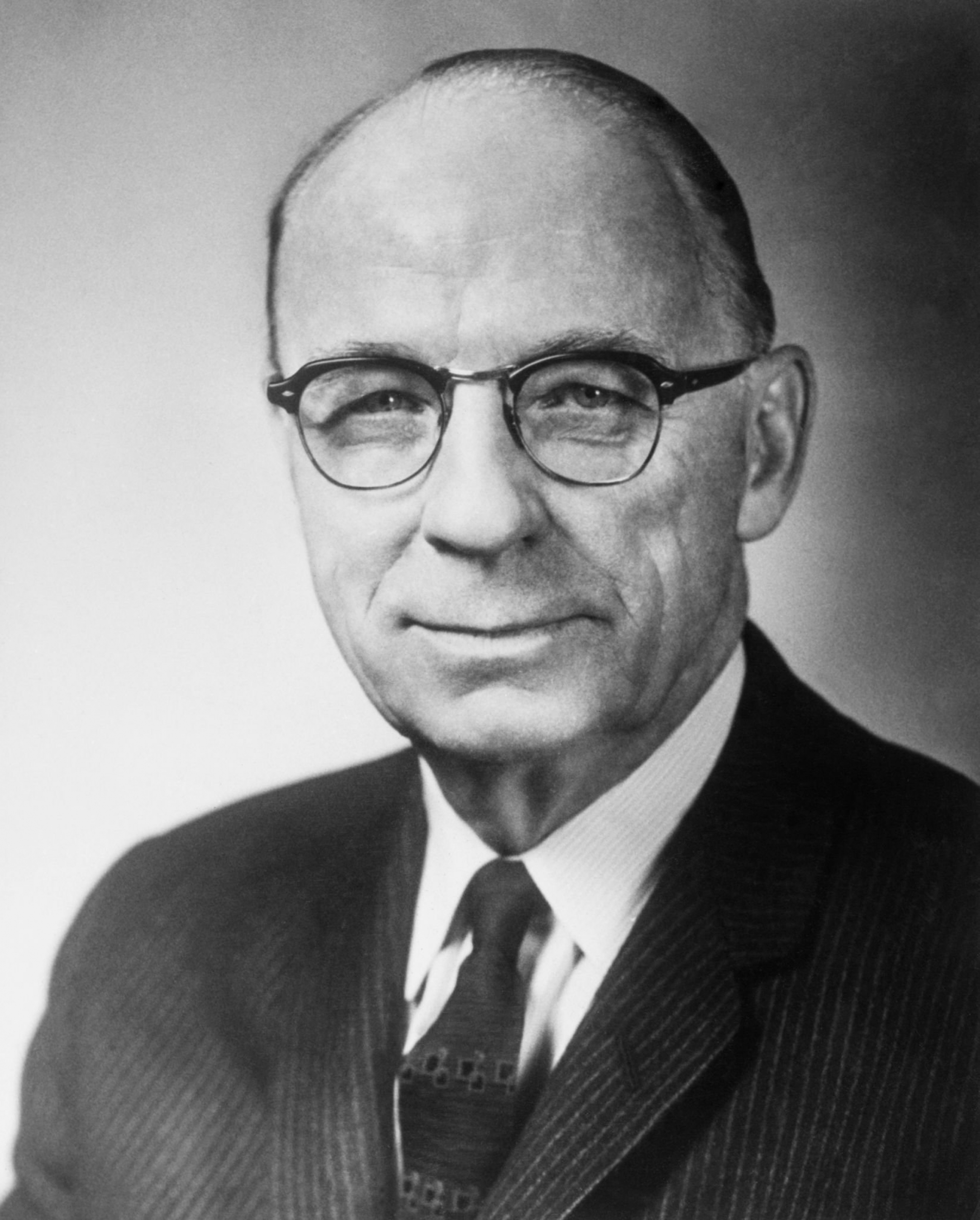

Nominee	Bourke B. Hickenlooper	Rudolph M. Evans
Party	Republican	Democratic
Popular vote	635,499	543,156
Percentage	53.92%	46.08%
- County results Stanley: 50–60% 60–70% 70–80% Evans: 50–60%
U.S. senator before election
Bourke B. Hickenlooper
Republican
Elected U.S. Senator
Bourke B. Hickenlooper
Republican

The 1956 United States Senate election in Iowa took place on November 6, 1956. Incumbent Republican Senator Bourke B. Hickenlooper was re-elected to a third term in office over Democrat Rudolph M. Evans.

== General election ==
=== Candidates ===
- Rudolph M. Evans (Democratic), former member of the Federal Reserve Board of Governors
- Bourke B. Hickenlooper, incumbent Senator since 1945 (Republican)

=== Results ===
1956 U.S. Senate election in Iowa
Party	Candidate	Votes	%	±%
Republican	Bourke B. Hickenlooper (incumbent)	635,499	53.92%	▼0.90
Democratic	Rudolph M. Evans	543,156	46.08%	▲1.38
Total votes		1,178,655	100.00%	

== See also ==
- 1956 United States Senate elections
