= Cyrus C. Carpenter =

American politician (1829–1898)

Cyrus Clay Carpenter
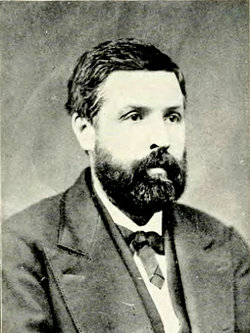

Member of the U.S. House of Representatives from Iowa's 9th district
- In office March 4, 1879 – March 3, 1883
- Preceded by: S. Addison Oliver
- Succeeded by: William H. M. Pusey

Iowa Railroad Commissioner
- In office March 26, 1878 – March 1879

2nd Comptroller of the Treasury
- In office January 1876 – September 1877

8th Governor of Iowa
- In office January 11, 1872 – January 13, 1876
- Lieutenant: Henry C. Bulis; Joseph Dysart
- Preceded by: Samuel Merrill
- Succeeded by: Samuel J. Kirkwood

Member of the Iowa House of Representatives
- In office 1884–1886

Registrar of the Iowa State Land Office
- In office 1866-1868

Personal details
- Born: November 24, 1829 Harford Township, Pennsylvania, U.S.
- Died: May 29, 1898 (aged 68) Fort Dodge, Iowa, U.S.
- Resting place: Oakland Cemetery; Fort Dodge, Iowa
- Party: Republican
- Spouse: Susan C. Burkholder
- Relatives: Gideon J. Carpenter (brother)
- Profession: Teacher; Surveyor

Military service
- Branch/service: Union Army
- Years of service: March 24, 1862–July 14, 1865
- Rank: Lieutenant colonel
- Battles/wars: Civil War

Cyrus Clay Carpenter (November 24, 1829 – May 29, 1898) was a Civil War officer, the eighth governor of Iowa and U.S. representative from Iowa's 9th congressional district.

== Early life ==
Born near Harford, Pennsylvania, Carpenter attended the common schools, and was graduated from Harford Academy in 1853. His parents were Asahel Carpenter and Amanda M. Thayer and he is a descendant of the immigrant William Carpenter, the founder of the Rehoboth Carpenter family who came to America in the mid-1630s.

== Early work ==
He moved to Iowa in 1854 and engaged in teaching in Fort Dodge, Iowa, and afterwards in land surveying, working as the County surveyor of Webster County in 1856. He studied law but never practiced. In March, 1857, he joined the relief expedition sent to Spirit Lake to aid the settlers driven from their homes by the Sioux Indians in the aftermath of the Spirit Lake Massacre.

He initially served as member of the Iowa House of Representatives from 1858 to 1860.

== Civil War ==
During the Civil War Carpenter volunteered as a private then was elected captain of volunteers on March 24, 1862, appointed lieutenant colonel on September 26, 1864, and brevet colonel on July 12, 1865 "for efficient and meritorious services" when he was in charge of commissary of subsistence in Sherman's Army on the march to the sea. He was mustered out July 14, 1865. During the war he served on the staff of Generals William Rosecrans, Grenville M. Dodge and John A. Logan.

After his service, he returned to Iowa where he married Susan C. Burkholder of Fort Dodge. He was elected as registrar of the Iowa state land office, from 1866 to 1868.

== Mid life ==
In 1871, he was run as a Republican for Governor of Iowa, winning his first two-year term. He was re-elected to a second term in 1873, serving until early 1876. At the expiration of his term he was appointed Second Comptroller of the Treasury of the United States, where he served two years, from January 1876 to September 1877. On March 26, 1878, he was appointed as a railroad commissioner of Iowa.

In 1878 Carpenter was elected to Congress to represent Iowa's 9th congressional district, which was then made up of the sparsely-settled northwestern quadrant of the state. After serving in the 46th United States Congress, he was re-elected in 1880 and served in the 47th United States Congress. He did not seek re-election to Congress in 1882. In all, he served in Congress from March 4, 1879, to March 3, 1883.

== Later life ==
In 1883, he again ran for the state legislature, winning election to the Iowa House of Representatives for a two-year term, and serving from 1884 to 1886.

Returning to Iowa from Washington, District of Columbia for the last time, he served as postmaster of Fort Dodge from 1889 to 1893. He also engaged in the management of his farm and in the real-estate business.

He died in Fort Dodge on May 29, 1898. He was interred in Oakland Cemetery in Fort Dodge.

Party political offices
Preceded by Samuel Merrill	Republican nominee Governor of Iowa; 1871, 1873	Succeeded by Samuel J. Kirkwood
Political offices
Preceded by Samuel Merrill	Governor of Iowa; 1872 – 1876	Succeeded by Samuel J. Kirkwood
U.S. House of Representatives
Preceded by S. Addison Oliver	Member of the U.S. House of Representatives from Iowa's 9th congressional district 1879–1883	Succeeded by William H. M. Pusey
