= John K. Valentine =

American politician and lawyer (1904-1950)

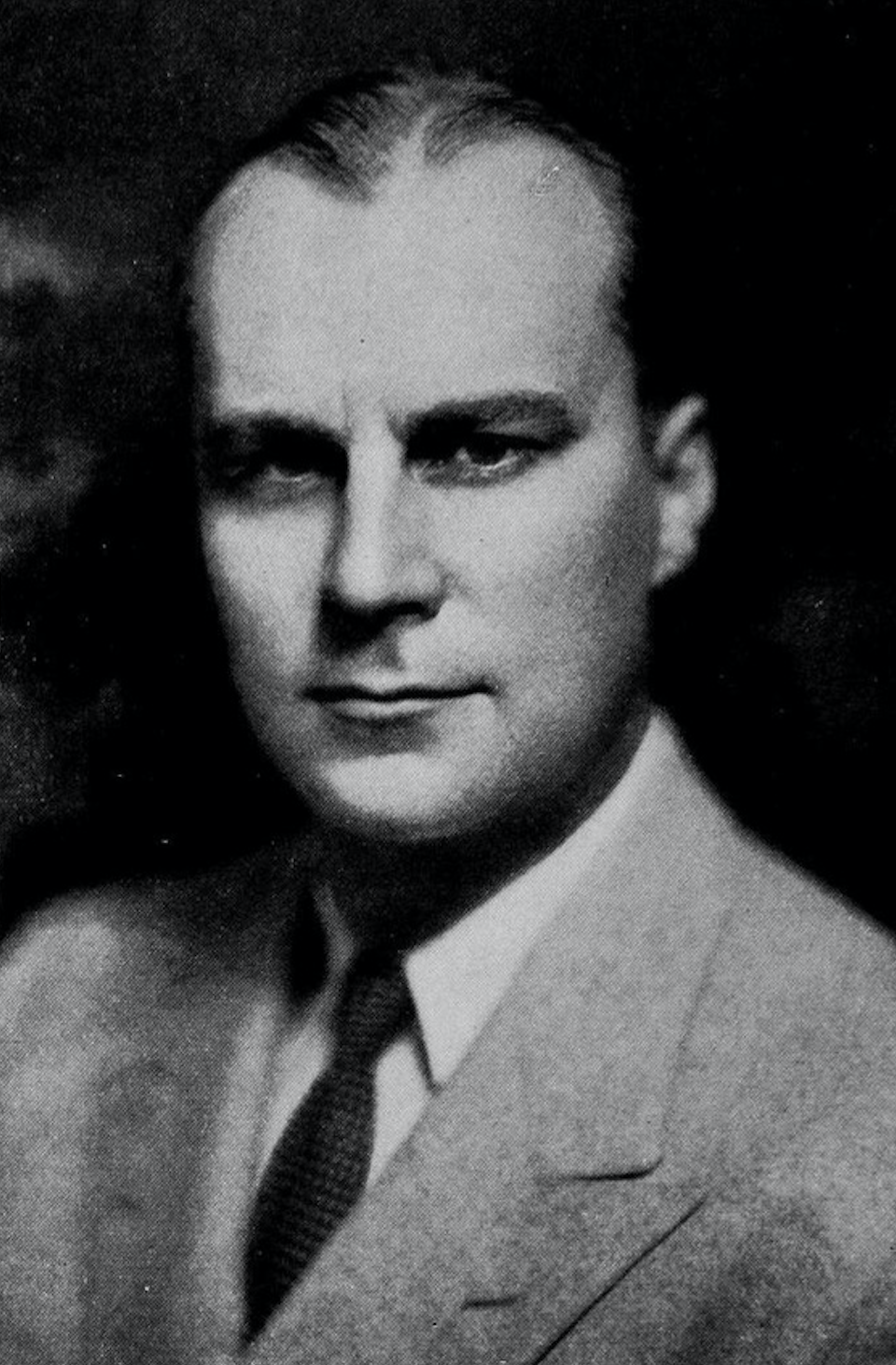
- Valentine in 1937

28th Lieutenant Governor of Iowa
- In office 1937–1939
- Governor: Nelson G. Kraschel
- Preceded by: Nelson G. Kraschel
- Succeeded by: Bourke B. Hickenlooper

Member of the Iowa Senate
- In office January 9, 1933 – July 31, 1935
- Constituency: 3rd district

Personal details
- Born: February 3, 1904 Oskaloosa, Iowa
- Died: October 12, 1950 (aged 46) Centerville, Iowa
- Education: University of Wisconsin–Madison

John Kalbach Valentine (February 3, 1904 – October 12, 1950) was an American Democratic politician and lawyer.

Born in Oskaloosa, Iowa, Valentine graduated from University of Wisconsin–Madison and received his law degree from University of Iowa College of Law. He then practiced law in Centerville, Iowa.

Valentine served in the Iowa State Senate representing the 3rd District. He resigned from the Senate in July 1935 to accept Governor Clyde Herring's appointment to be the Chairman of the State Board of Assessment and Review. In 1937, he became the Lieutenant Governor of Iowa and served until 1939.

Valentine died in Centerville, Iowa serving under Governor Nelson G. Kraschel.

Party political offices
Preceded by Nelson G. Kraschel	Democratic nominee for Governor of Iowa; 1940	Succeeded by Nelson G. Kraschel
Iowa Senate
Preceded by Herbert Carroll	3rd district 1933–1936	Succeeded by Hugh Guernsey
Political offices
Preceded by Nelson G. Kraschel	Lieutenant Governor of Iowa; 1937–1939	Succeeded by Bourke B. Hickenlooper
