= Wilson Island State Recreation Area =

Protected area in Iowa, United States

- Location within Iowa Location within the United States
- Location: Harrison County, Iowa, United States
- Nearest city: Missouri Valley, Iowa
- Coordinates: 41°29′00″N 96°00′24″W
- Area: 544 acres (220 ha)
- Administrator: Iowa Department of Natural Resources
- Website: Official website

Wilson Island State Recreation Area is a 544-acre (220 ha) state recreation area in Harrison County, Iowa, United States, near the city of Missouri Valley. The park, which is named for Iowa governor George A. Wilson, encompasses a forested area along the Missouri River.

The recreation area includes a boat ramp and fishing sites along the river. Fish living in the river include catfish, paddlefish, and walleye. The park is also open to hunting outside of developed areas, with deer and bird hunting being the most popular. Morel mushrooms grow in the recreation area, attracting foragers during the spring months. The park also has six miles (9.7 km) of multi-use trails and a modern campground.
