= John Hammill =

American politician (1875-1936)

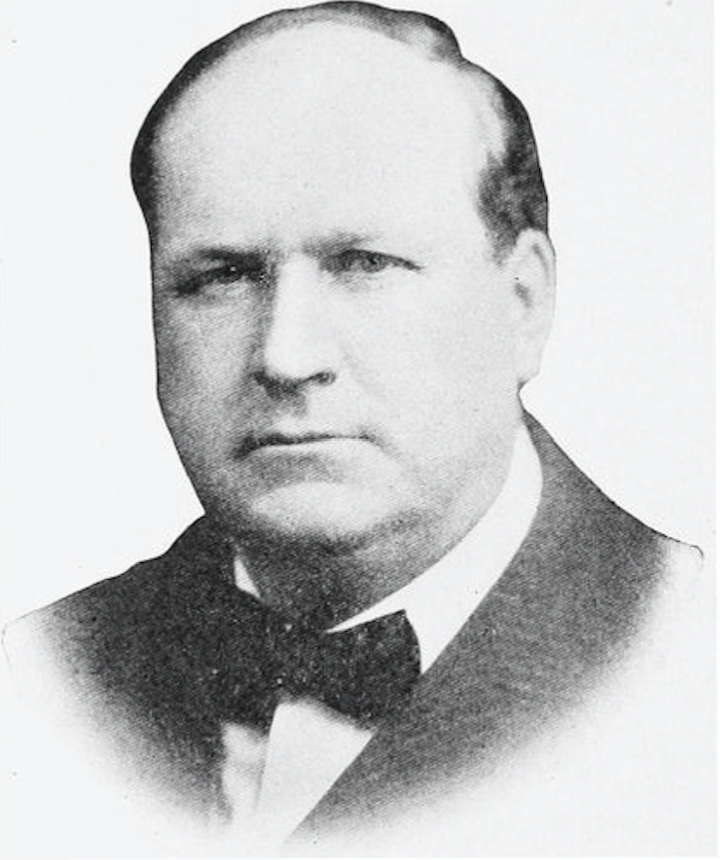

24th Governor of Iowa
- In office January 15, 1925 – January 15, 1931; Acting:August 1922-October 1922
- Lieutenant: Clem F. Kimball; Arch W. McFarlane
- Preceded by: Nathan E. Kendall
- Succeeded by: Daniel Webster Turner

24th Lieutenant Governor of Iowa
- In office January 13, 1921 – January 15, 1925
- Governor: Nathan E. Kendall
- Preceded by: Ernest Robert Moore
- Succeeded by: Clem F. Kimball

Member of the Iowa Senate
- In office January 11, 1909 – January 12, 1913
- Constituency: 43rd District

Personal details
- Born: October 14, 1875 Linden, Wisconsin, US
- Died: April 6, 1936 (aged 60) Minneapolis, Minnesota, US
- Party: Republican
- Spouse: Fannie B. Richards (m. 1899)

John Hammill (October 14, 1875 – April 6, 1936) served three terms as the 24th governor of Iowa from 1925 to 1931.

== Early life ==
Hammill was born in Linden, Wisconsin to George and Mary (Brewer) Hammill. He earned a law degree from the University of Iowa College of Law in 1897, and practiced law in Britt, Iowa.

He married Fannie B. Richards on June 7, 1899. They had no children.

== Political career ==
=== Local and state career ===
After serving as a Hancock County attorney from 1902 to 1908, he was elected to the Iowa Senate where he served until 1913. In 1920, he was elected the Lieutenant Governor of Iowa and was re-elected to that position in 1922, serving until 1925.

=== Governorship ===
In August 1922, Governor Nathan E. Kendall was sidelined because of a heart condition, which led to speculation that he would resign before the end of his term, thus leaving Hammill as Iowa's governor. Although Kendall left the state for an extended stay in Hawaii to recuperate, leaving Hammill as Iowa's acting governor for several months, Kendall did not resign. Kendall did not seek re-election in 1924, and Hammill announced his candidacy for the post.

Hammill won the 1924 Republican gubernatorial nomination, and defeated James C. Murtagh in the general election in a landslide. He was sworn into the governor's office on January 15, 1925. He won reelection to a second term in 1926 (defeating Democratic candidate Alex R. Miller), and to a third term in 1928 (defeating Democratic candidate L. W. Housel).

Hammill advocated for the sterilization of the unfit.

During his tenure an office of superintendent of child welfare was created, and added junior colleges into the public school system.

Hammill mentioned aviation in a speech to the General Assembly,the first to ever do so, moving the Assembly to establish air traffic control and aircraft and airmen licensing laws.

==== Highway improvement ====
Before his tenure, Iowa was known as "the Mud Roads State of the Union." During his tenure, by "legislating, locating, grading, draining and bridging" its primary roads, Iowa became one of the "best road states of the Union." Secondary roads had been a local responsibility, specifically counties or townships. With a new law, the Secondary Road Law, this helped to consolidated control of all of all the roadways, reducing the number of officials from 5,500 to 400 and centralizing the administration of highways under the control of the state highway commission. Secondary road funds were consolidated, resulting in hundreds of miles of secondary roads being graded and surfaced with gravel. Eventually, the state initiated a gasoline tax of two cents per gallon, later three cents per gallon, giving 5/9ths to the primary roads and 4/9ths to the secondary roads. Prior to his governorship, Iowa had fewer than 600 miles of paved roads and 2,500 miles of gravel roads, but at the end of his term, Iowa had 3,340 miles of paved primary roads and 2,420 miles of gravel roads. He reduced Iowa's unimproved roads from 24% down to 3%.

==== Banking improvement ====
The state enacted new banking laws, which were managed by the state banking board and established credit unions with the Iowa Credit Union Act in 1925, resulting in "the most comprehensive recodification of the banking laws that Iowa has ever undertaken since banking was set up in this state."

==== Women's rights ====
On August 18, 1920, the United States passed the 19th Amendment to the Constitution, giving women the right to vote. The Iowa Constitution required that only men could serve in the General Assembly. In 1926, this changed with a new constitutional amendment being added to the Iowa State Constitution that allowed women to be elected to the General Assembly. The amendment stated:

Strike out the word male from Section four (4) of Article three (III) of said constitution, relating to the legislative department

=== 1930 U.S. Senate election ===
Hammill did not run for reelection as governor in 1930, choosing instead to run for the United States Senate. He lost in the Republican primary to Lester J. Dickinson.

== Later life ==
He died on April 6, 1936, of a heart attack in a Minneapolis hotel room after leaving a conference regarding the dismemberment of the Minneapolis and St. Louis Railway and was buried in Britt. His wife, Fannie, died in December 1970 at age 92, in Britt, Iowa.

Party political offices
Preceded by Nathan E. Kendall	Republican nominee Governor of Iowa; 1924, 1926, 1928	Succeeded by Dan W. Turner
Political offices
Preceded by Ernest Robert Moore	Lieutenant Governor of Iowa; 1921–1925	Succeeded by Clem F. Kimball
Preceded by Nathan E. Kendall	Governor of Iowa; 1925–1931	Succeeded by Daniel Webster Turner
