= Bourke B. Hickenlooper =

American politician (1896–1971)

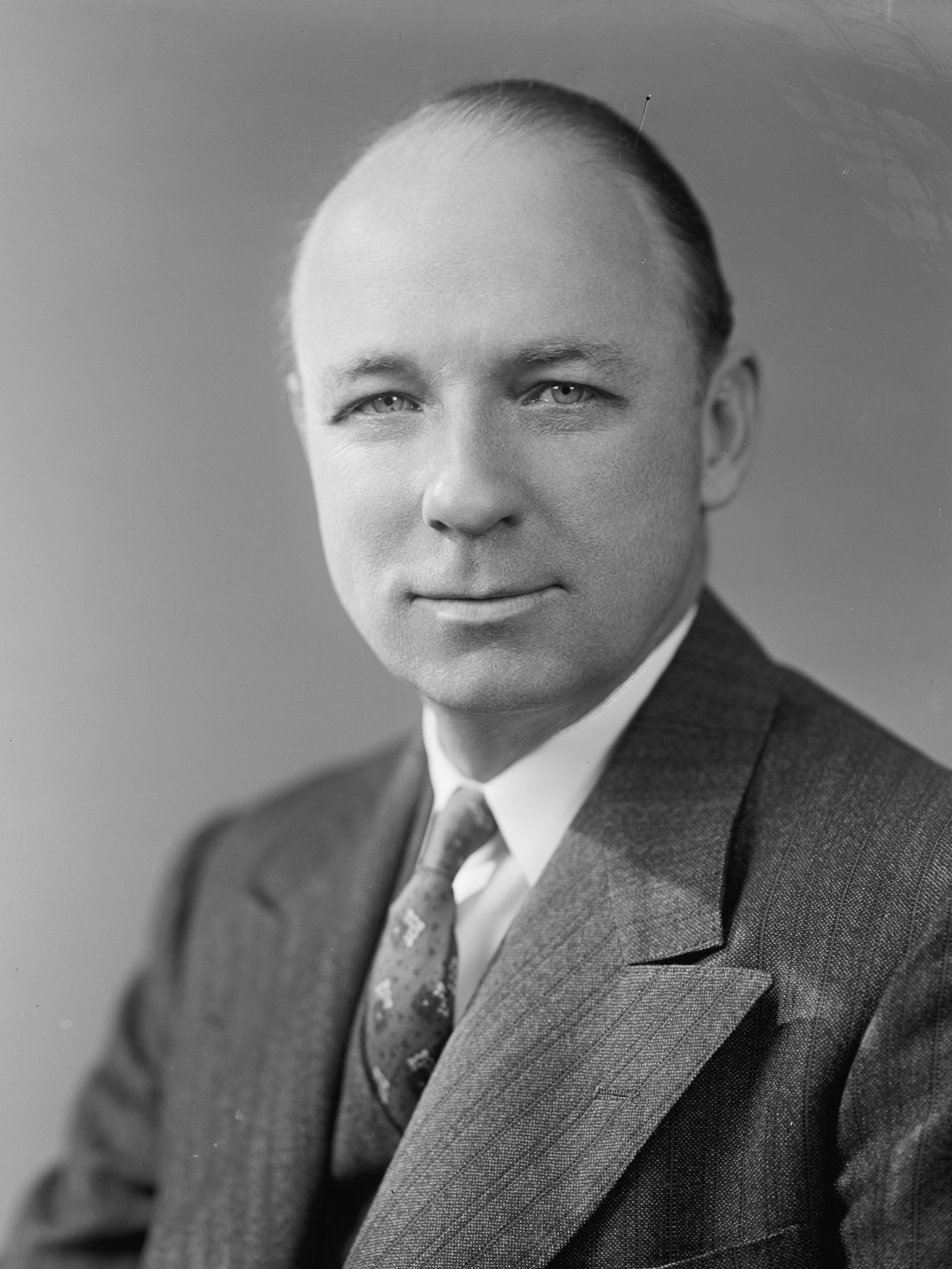
- Hickenlooper in 1945

United States Senator from Iowa
- In office January 3, 1945 – January 3, 1969
- Preceded by: Guy Gillette
- Succeeded by: Harold Hughes
Committee positions
Chair of the Senate Republican Policy Committee
In office January 3, 1962 – January 3, 1969
Leader	Everett Dirksen
Preceded by	Styles Bridges
Succeeded by	Gordon L. Allott
Chair of the Joint Atomic Energy Committee
In office January 3, 1947 – January 3, 1949
Preceded by	Brien McMahon
Succeeded by	Brien McMahon

29th Governor of Iowa
- In office January 14, 1943 – January 11, 1945
- Lieutenant: Robert D. Blue
- Preceded by: George A. Wilson
- Succeeded by: Robert D. Blue

29th Lieutenant Governor of Iowa
- In office January 12, 1939 – January 14, 1943
- Governor: George A. Wilson
- Preceded by: John K. Valentine
- Succeeded by: Robert D. Blue

Member of the Iowa House of Representatives from the 48th district
- In office January 1935 – January 12, 1939

Personal details
- Born: Bourke Blakemore Hickenlooper; July 21, 1896 Blockton, Iowa, U.S.
- Died: September 4, 1971 (aged 75) Shelter Island, New York, U.S.
- Resting place: Cedar Memorial Park (Cedar Rapids, Iowa)
- Party: Republican
- Spouse: Verna Eilene Bensch (m. 1927)
- Children: 2
- Relatives: John Hickenlooper (grand-nephew)
- Education: Iowa State College; University of Iowa Law
- Occupation: Politician, Attorney

Military service
- Branch/service: United States Army
- Years of service: May 1917-March 1919
- Rank: Second Lieutenant
- Unit: 339th Field Artillery Regiment of the 85th Infantry Division
- Battles/wars: World War I

Bourke Blakemore Hickenlooper (July 21, 1896 – September 4, 1971), was an American politician and member of the Republican Party, first elected to statewide office in Iowa as lieutenant governor, then 29th governor of Iowa, then U.S. senator.

== Early life and education ==
Born in 1896 in Blockton, Iowa, to Nathan O. and Margaret A. Hickenlooper. His college education at Iowa State College in Ames was interrupted by his service in the U.S. Army.

In 1927, he married Verna Eilene Bensch and had two children.

=== World War I ===
He served as a Second Lieutenant of the 339th Field Artillery Regiment of the 85th Infantry Division in France during World War I. He served from May 1917 to March 1919.

=== Higher education ===
After his military service, Hickenlooper finished his education at Iowa State, graduating in 1919, and then went on to the University of Iowa College of Law, where he received a law degree in 1922. He was admitted to the bar in 1922 and started practicing law in Cedar Rapids, Iowa.

=== Religion ===
Hickenlooper was a Methodist.

== Political career ==
=== Local office ===
Hickenlooper was first elected to the Iowa House of Representatives in 1934, serving from 1935 to 1939.

=== Governor of Iowa ===
In 1938, he was elected to be the Lieutenant Governor of Iowa, serving from 1939 to 1943.

In the 1942 gubernatorial election, Hickenlooper ran to succeed George A. Wilson, who instead ran for a U.S. Senate seat. Hickenlooper defeated former governor Nelson Kraschel by a margin of 63% to 37%, serving one term from 1943 to 1945. As governor, Hickenlooper oversaw the rejection of the federal government's soldier vote ballot. He also directed state funding to fund the World War II effort and endorsed participation in a world peace international organization. He did not seek another term as governor in 1944, instead running for a seat in the U.S. Senate. He narrowly defeated incumbent Democratic senator, Guy Gillette, and took office in January 1945. (Gillette would defeat Wilson in 1948 to take the state's other Senate seat and serve as Hickenlooper's colleague for six years.)

=== United States Senator ===
In the Senate, Hickenlooper was known as one of the most conservative and isolationist members of the Republican Party, and perhaps one of the most conservative members of Congress. He became one of the most powerful Republicans in the Senate, serving as the Republican Policy Committee Chairman from 1962 to 1969. In this position, he had an intense rivalry with Everett Dirksen, the Senate Republican leader at the time. Hickenlooper voted in favor of the Civil Rights Acts of 1957 and 1960, but along with fellow conservative Barry Goldwater, voted against the Civil Rights Act of 1964. He also voted in favor of the 24th Amendment to the U.S. Constitution and the Voting Rights Act of 1965.

Hickenlooper won reelection to his Senate seat in 1950, 1956, and 1962. He did not run for reelection in 1968, and was succeeded by Democratic Governor Harold E. Hughes.

==== Legislation ====
The 1962 Hickenlooper Amendment to the foreign aid bill cuts off aid to any country expropriating U.S. property. The amendment was aimed at Castro's Cuba, which had expropriated U.S.-owned and U.S.-controlled sugar plantations and refineries.

==== USS Liberty incident ====
Senator Hickenlooper was outraged by the 1967 USS Liberty incident and was one of the few Congressmen to call for an investigation. He was openly skeptical of Israel's mistaken identity explanation:

"From what I have read I can't tolerate for one minute that this was an accident. I think it was a deliberate assault on this ship. I think they had ample opportunity to identify it as an American ship. … What have we done about the Liberty? Have we become so placid, so far as Israel is concerned or so far as that area is concerned, that we will take the killing of 37 [sic] American boys and the wounding of a lot more and the attack of an American ship in the open sea in good weather? We have seemed to say: 'Oh, well, boys will be boys.' What are you going to do about it? It is most offensive to me…It is inconceivable to me that the ship could not have been identified. According to everything I saw, the American flag was flying on this ship. It had a particular configuration. Even a landlubber could look at it and see that it has no characteristic configuration comparable to the so-called Egyptian ship they now try to say they mistook it for. It just doesn't add up to me. It is not at all satisfactory."

== Death ==
On September 4, 1971, Hickenlooper died at the age of 75 while visiting friends in Shelter Island, New York, after suffering a heart attack. He was buried at the Cedar Memorial Park cemetery in Cedar Rapids, Iowa. His wife had died the year before in 1970.

Party political offices
Preceded by George A. Wilson	Republican nominee for Governor of Iowa; 1942	Succeeded by Robert D. Blue
Preceded by Lester J. Dickinson	Republican nominee for U.S. Senator from Iowa (Class 3); 1944, 1950, 1956, 1962	Succeeded by David M. Stanley
Preceded by Styles Bridges	Chair of the Senate Republican Policy Committee; 1962–1969	Succeeded by Gordon Allott
Political offices
Preceded by John K. Valentine	Lieutenant Governor of Iowa; 1939–1943	Succeeded by Robert D. Blue
Preceded by George A. Wilson	Governor of Iowa; 1943–1945	Succeeded by Robert D. Blue
U.S. Senate
Preceded by Guy Gillette	U.S. Senator (Class 3) from Iowa; 1945–1969; Served alongside: George A. Wilson, Guy Gillette, Thomas E. Martin, Jack R. Miller	Succeeded by Harold Hughes
Preceded by Brien McMahon	Chair of the Joint Atomic Energy Committee; 1947–1949	Succeeded by Brien McMahon
Preceded by Alexander Wiley	Ranking Member of the Senate Foreign Relations Committee; 1963–1969	Succeeded by George Aiken
