= 1924 Iowa gubernatorial election =

- November 4, 1924
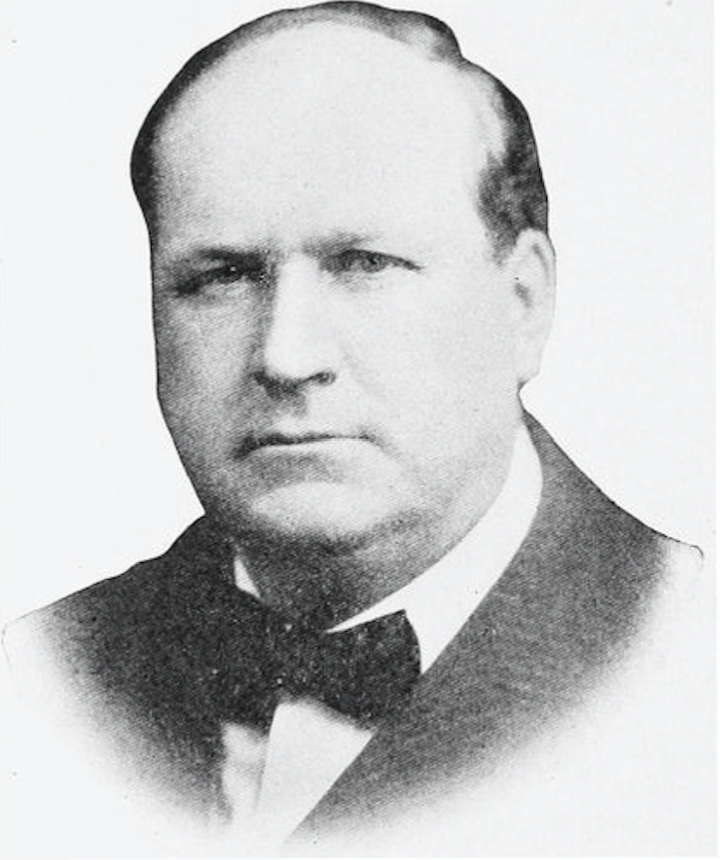

Nominee	John Hammill	James C. Murtagh
Party	Republican	Democratic
Popular vote	604,624	226,850
Percentage	72.72%	27.28%
- County results Hammill: 50–60% 60–70% 70–80% 80–90% >90% Murtagh: 50–60%
Governor before election
Nathan E. Kendall
Republican
Elected Governor
John Hammill
Republican

The 1924 Iowa gubernatorial election was held on November 4, 1924. Republican nominee John Hammill defeated Democratic nominee James C. Murtagh with 72.72% of the vote.

== Primary elections ==
Primary elections were held on June 2, 1924.

=== Republican primary ===
==== Candidates ====
- John Hammill, incumbent Lieutenant Governor
- W. J. Burbank
- J. H. Anderson
- Glenn C. Haynes
- Jonas D. Buser
- A. J. Banks

==== Results ====
Republican primary results
Party	Candidate	Votes	%
Republican	John Hammill	95,313	27.23
Republican	W. J. Burbank	88,304	25.22
Republican	J. H. Anderson	74,828	21.37
Republican	Glenn C. Haynes	65,088	18.59
Republican	Jonas D. Buser	15,459	4.42
Republican	A. J. Banks	11,097	3.17
Total votes		350,089	100.00

== General election ==
=== Candidates ===
- John Hammill, Republican
- James C. Murtagh, Democratic

=== Results ===
1924 Iowa gubernatorial election
Party	Candidate	Votes	%	±%
Republican	John Hammill	604,624	72.72%	
Democratic	James C. Murtagh	226,850	27.28%	
Majority		377,774		
Turnout				
Republican hold		Swing		
