= 1873 Iowa gubernatorial election =

- October 14, 1873
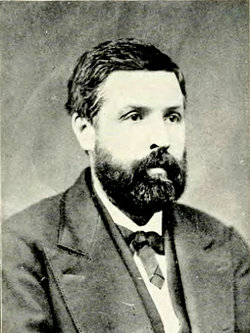

Nominee	Cyrus C. Carpenter	Jacob G. Vale
Party	Republican	Anti-Monopoly
Popular vote	105,132	82,556
Percentage	55.54%	43.61%
- County results Carpenter: 50–60% 60–70% 70–80% 80–90% 90–100% Vale: 50–60% 60–70%
Governor before election
Cyrus C. Carpenter
Republican
Elected Governor
Cyrus C. Carpenter
Republican

The 1873 Iowa gubernatorial election was held on October 14, 1873. Incumbent Republican Cyrus C. Carpenter defeated Anti-Monopoly nominee Jacob G. Vale with 55.54% of the vote.

== General election ==
=== Candidates ===
- Cyrus C. Carpenter, Republican
- Jacob G. Vale, Anti-Monopoly

=== Results ===
1873 Iowa gubernatorial election
Party	Candidate	Votes	%	±%
Republican	Cyrus C. Carpenter (incumbent)	105,132	55.54%	
Anti-Monopoly	Jacob G. Vale	82,556	43.61%	
Majority		22,576		
Turnout				
Republican hold		Swing		
