= 1871 Iowa gubernatorial election =

- October 10, 1871
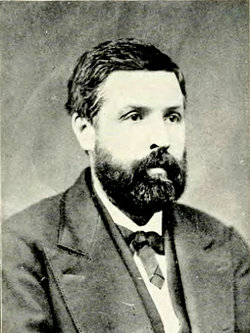

Nominee	Cyrus C. Carpenter	J. C. Knapp
Party	Republican	Democratic
Popular vote	109,328	68,199
Percentage	61.46%	38.34%
- County results Carpenter: 50–60% 60–70% 70–80% 80–90% 90–100% Knapp: 50–60% 60–70%
Governor before election
Samuel Merrill
Republican
Elected Governor
Cyrus C. Carpenter
Republican

The 1871 Iowa gubernatorial election was held on October 10, 1871. Republican nominee Cyrus C. Carpenter defeated Democratic nominee J. C. Knapp with 61.46% of the vote.

== General election ==
=== Candidates ===
- Cyrus C. Carpenter, Republican
- J. C. Knapp, Democratic

=== Results ===
1871 Iowa gubernatorial election
Party	Candidate	Votes	%	±%
Republican	Cyrus C. Carpenter	109,328	61.46%	
Democratic	J. C. Knapp	68,199	38.34%	
Majority		41,129		
Turnout				
Republican hold		Swing		
