= 1926 Iowa gubernatorial election =

- November 2, 1926
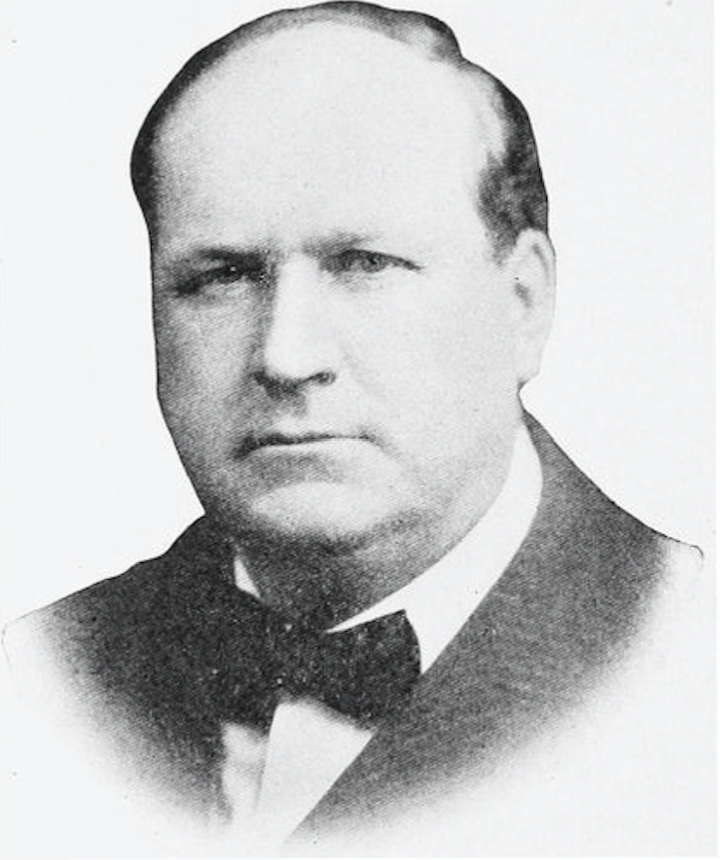

Nominee	John Hammill	Alex R. Miller
Party	Republican	Democratic
Popular vote	377,443	150,415
Percentage	71.51%	28.50%
- County results Hammill: 50–60% 60–70% 70–80% 80–90% >90% Miller: 50–60%
Governor before election
John Hammill
Republican
Elected Governor
John Hammill
Republican

The 1926 Iowa gubernatorial election was held on November 2, 1926. Incumbent Republican John Hammill defeated Democratic nominee Alex R. Miller with 71.51% of the vote.

== General election ==
=== Candidates ===
- John Hammill, Republican
- Alex R. Miller, Democratic

=== Results ===
1926 Iowa gubernatorial election
Party	Candidate	Votes	%	±%
Republican	John Hammill (incumbent)	377,443	71.51%	
Democratic	Alex R. Miller	150,415	28.50%	
Majority		227,028		
Turnout				
Republican hold		Swing		
