= 1928 Iowa gubernatorial election =

- November 6, 1928
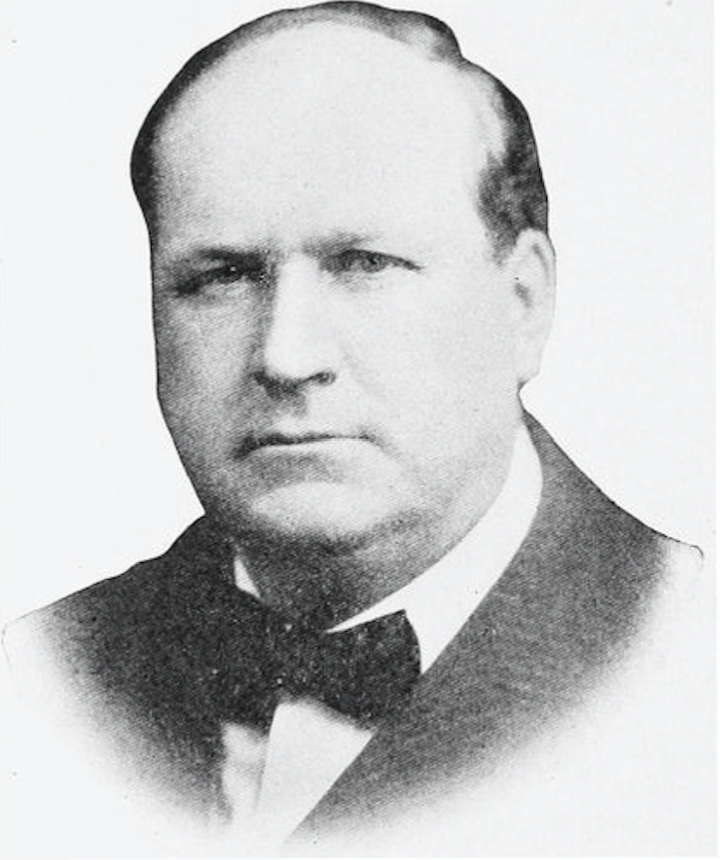

Nominee	John Hammill	L. W. Housel
Party	Republican	Democratic
Popular vote	591,720	350,722
Percentage	62.79%	37.21%
- County results Hammill: 50–60% 60–70% 70–80% Housel: 50–60% 60–70%
Governor before election
John Hammill
Republican
Elected Governor
John Hammill
Republican

The 1928 Iowa gubernatorial election was held on November 6, 1928. Incumbent Republican John Hammill defeated Democratic nominee L. W. Housel with 62.79% of the vote.

== General election ==
=== Candidates ===
- John Hammill, Republican
- L. W. Housel, Democratic

=== Results ===
1928 Iowa gubernatorial election
Party	Candidate	Votes	%	±%
Republican	John Hammill (incumbent)	591,720	62.79%	
Democratic	L. W. Housel	350,722	37.21%	
Majority		240,998		
Turnout				
Republican hold		Swing		
