= 1942 United States Senate election in Iowa =

- November 3, 1942
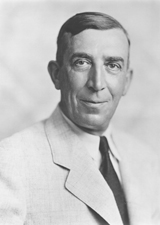

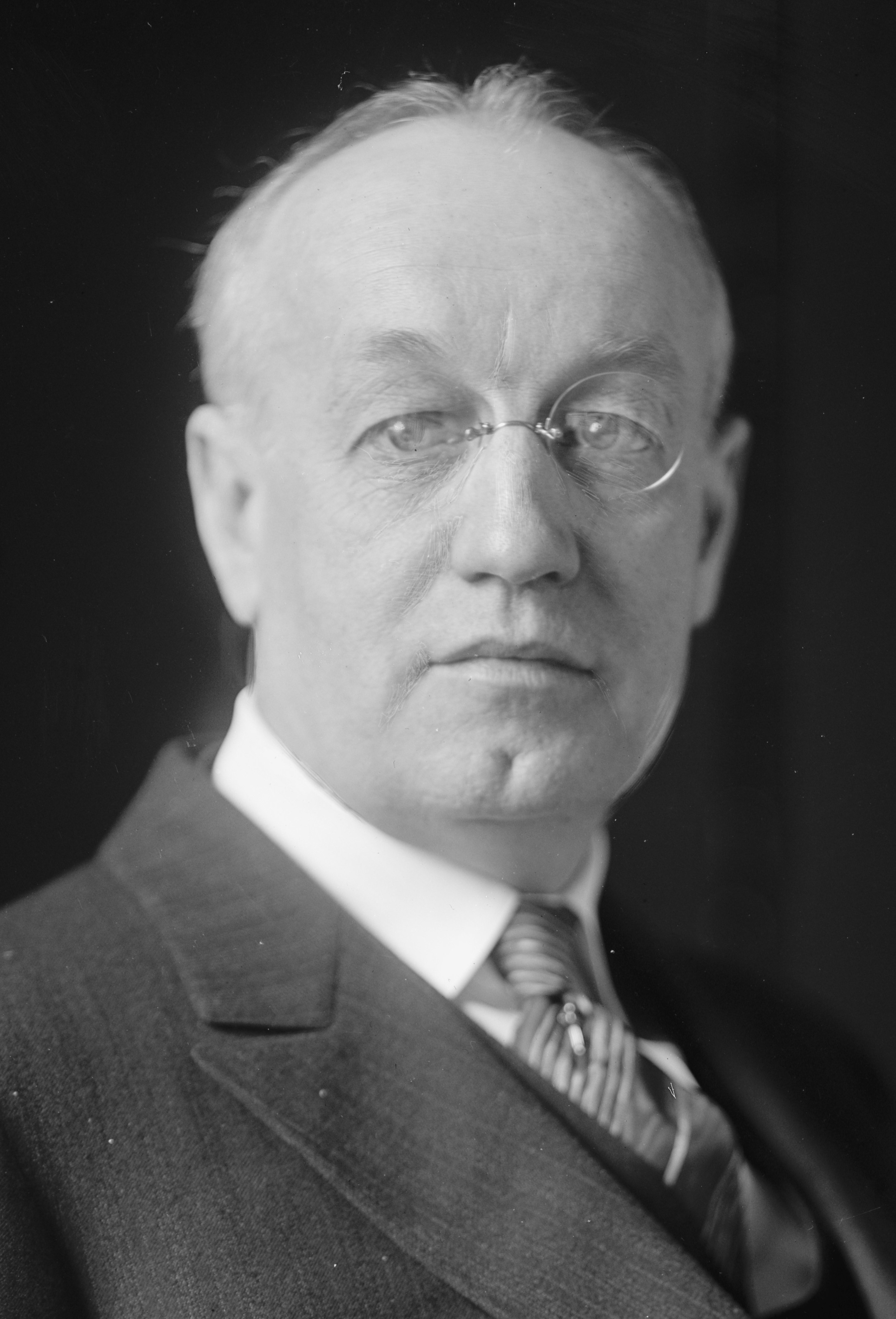
Nominee	George A. Wilson	Clyde Herring
Party	Republican	Democratic
Popular vote	410,383	295,194
Percentage	57.98%	41.70%
- County results Wilson: 50–60% 60–70% 70–80% Herring: 50–60%
U.S. senator before election
Clyde Herring
Democratic
Elected U.S. Senator
George A. Wilson
Republican

The 1942 United States Senate election in Iowa took place on November 3, 1942. Incumbent Democratic Senator Clyde Herring ran for re-election to a second term but was defeated by Republican Governor George A. Wilson.

== Democratic primary ==
=== Candidates ===
- Clyde Herring, incumbent Senator since 1937 and former Governor
- Ernest J. Seemann, perennial candidate

=== Results ===
1942 Democratic U.S. Senate primary
Party	Candidate	Votes	%
Democratic	Clyde Herring (incumbent)	62,176	78.34%
Democratic	Ernest Seemann	17,190	21.66%
Total votes		79,366	100.00%

After losing the primary, Seemann entered the general election on the "Progressive New Dealer" ticket.

== Republican primary ==
=== Candidates ===
- G. Scott Davies
- James I. Dolliver, member of the Fort Dodge Board of Education, former County Attorney for Webster County, and nephew of former Senator Jonathan P. Dolliver
- Mark G. Thornburg, Iowa Secretary of Agriculture since 1939
- George A. Wilson, Governor of Iowa since 1939

=== Results ===
1942 Republican U.S. Senate primary
Party	Candidate	Votes	%
Republican	George A. Wilson	121,565	51.69%
Republican	Mark G. Thornburg	76,818	32.66%
Republican	James I. Dolliver	29,874	12.70%
Republican	G. Scott Davies	6,919	2.94%
Total votes		235,176	100.00%

== General election ==
=== Results ===
1942 U.S. Senate election in Iowa
Party	Candidate	Votes	%	±%
Republican	George A. Wilson	410,383	57.98%	▲10.99
Democratic	Clyde Herring (incumbent)	295,194	41.70%	▼8.65
Prohibition	M. M. Heptonstall	1,461	0.21%	▲0.05
Prog. New Deal	Ernest J. Seemann	821	0.12%	N/A
Total votes		707,859	100.00%	

== See also ==
- 1942 United States Senate elections
