= Arch W. McFarlane =

American businessman and politician (1885-1960)

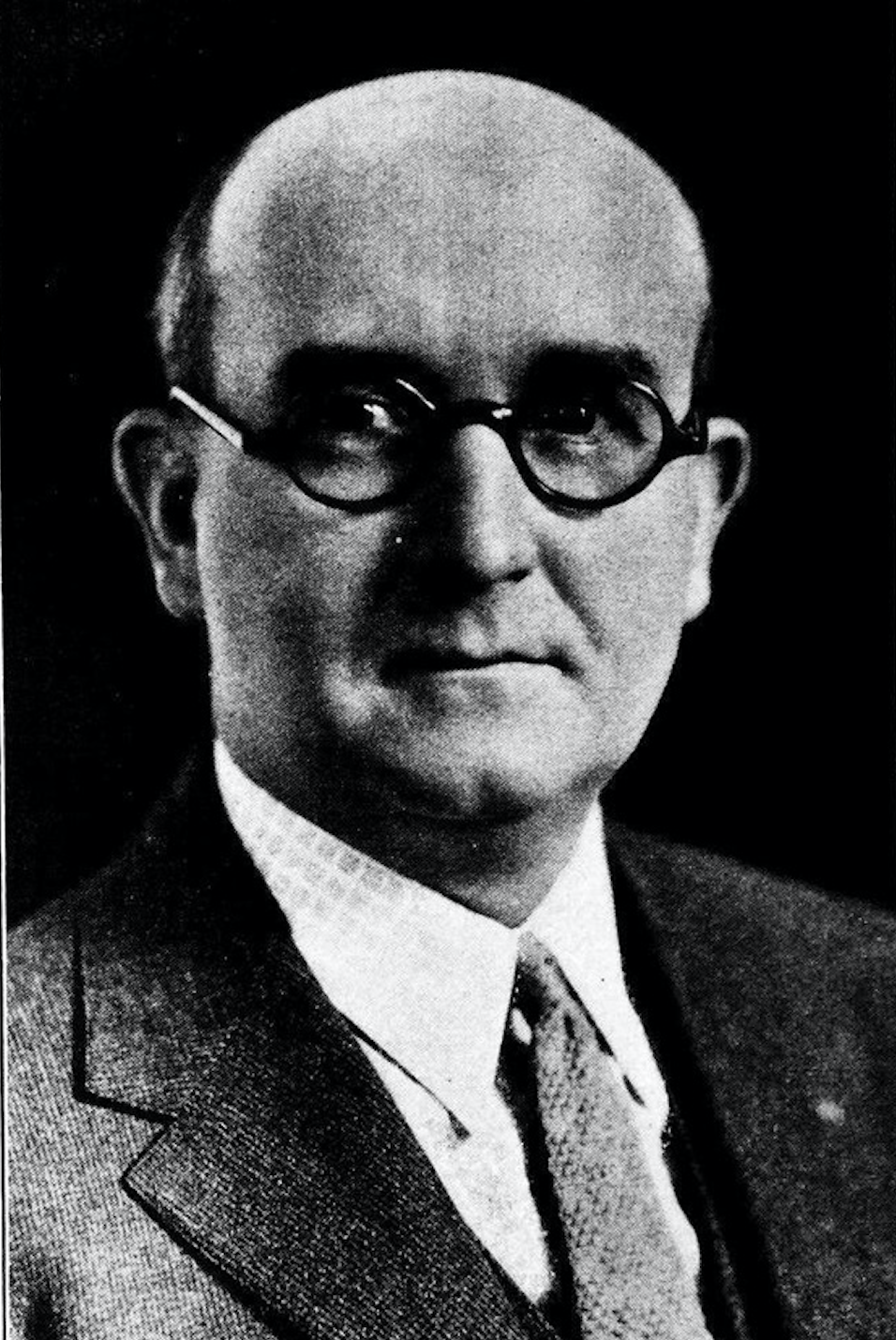

26th Lieutenant Governor of Iowa
- In office November 14, 1928 – January 12, 1933
- Governor: John Hammill; Daniel Webster Turner
- Preceded by: Clem F. Kimball
- Succeeded by: Nelson G. Kraschel

Member of the Iowa Senate for the 38th District
- In office January 10, 1927 – September 10, 1928
- Preceded by: M. L. Bowman
- Succeeded by: Charles T. Rogers
- In office January 10, 1955 – January 11, 1959
- Preceded by: John P. Berg
- Succeeded by: Melvin H. Wolf

Member of the Iowa House of Representatives for the 66th District
- In office January 11, 1913 – January 7, 1923
- Preceded by: Henry W. Grout
- Succeeded by: E. M. Litchy
- In office January 9, 1933 – January 10, 1937
- Preceded by: C. A. Hollis
- Succeeded by: Iver Christoffersen
- In office January 9, 1939 – January 9, 1949
- Preceded by: Iver Christoffersen
- Succeeded by: Earl A. Miller
- In office January 8, 1951 – January 9, 1955
- Preceded by: Earl A. Miller
- Succeeded by: Earl A. Miller

Personal details
- Born: April 14, 1885 Waterloo, Iowa, U.S.
- Died: July 24, 1960 (aged 75) Chicago, Illinois, U.S.
- Occupation: businessman and politician

Arch W. McFarlane (April 14, 1885 – July 24, 1960) was an American Republican businessman and politician.

== Biography ==
Born in Waterloo, Iowa, McFarlane owned a fuel oil business.

== Political career ==
=== Iowa House ===
McFarlane served in the Iowa House four separate times for a cumulative 28 years, representing the 66th District in all his terms.

He served from 1913 until 1923. In 1923, he ran for the US House 3rd district seat. He ran against Thomas J. B. Robinson and Charles O. Ryan in the Republican primary. He came in third, receiving only 10,173 votes against Robinson's 10,631 votes and Ryan's 10,592 votes.

He ran in 1932 to regain his seat in the 66th district and won. He was re-elected in 1934. He lost re-election in the 1936 election, losing by 1,100 votes, coming in fourth place. He won in the 1938, 1940, 1942, 1944 and 1946 elections. He lost in the 1948 primaries to Earl Miller, who was elected in the general election. He returned to the House after winning in the 1950 election. He was re-elected in 1952 and remained in the House until 1955 when he was re-elected to the Iowa Senate.

=== Iowa Senate ===
He was elected in 1927, serving from January 1928 to September 1928. He resigned to run for Lieutenant Governor in November 1928.

He returned to the Senate following his 1954 election win. He served one term until 1959.

He served in the Iowa Senate for 4 years and 8 months.

=== Lieutenant Governor ===
In September, Lieutenant Governor Clem Kimball died. The Republican Committee replaced Kimball with McFarlane, running him as the Lieutenant Governor. He won the election in November 1928. A week after winning this election, Governor John Hammill appointed McFarlane to fill Kimball's remaining term until January 1, 1933.

He was also Lieutenant Governor of Iowa from 1928 to 1933 serving under Governors John Hammill and Daniel Webster Turner.

== Later life ==
He died in Chicago, Illinois of a heart attack while attending the Republican Party National Convention.

== Notes ==
Political offices
Preceded by Clem F. Kimball	Lieutenant Governor of Iowa; 1928–1933	Succeeded by Nelson G. Kraschel
