= 1938 Iowa gubernatorial election =

- November 8, 1938
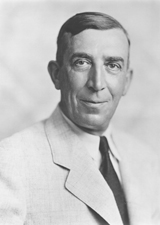

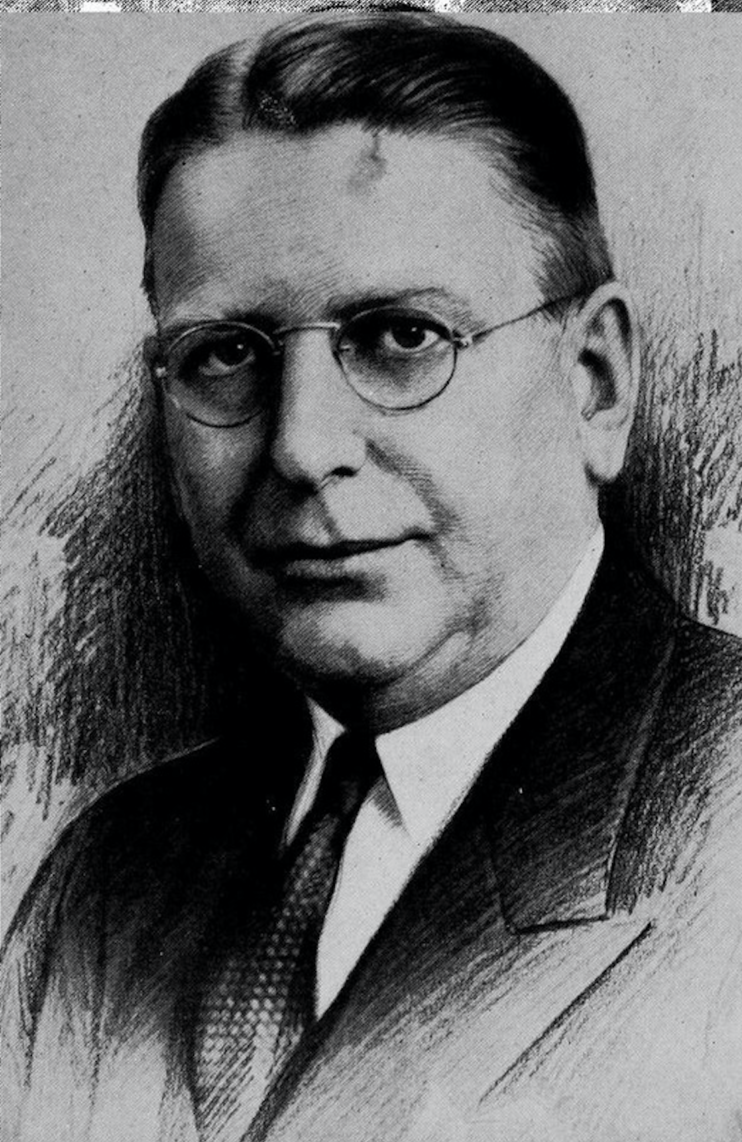
| Nominee | George A. Wilson | Nelson G. Kraschel |
| Party | Republican | Democratic |
| Popular vote | 447,061 | 387,779 |
| Percentage | 52.71% | 45.72% |
- County results Wilson: 40–50% 50–60% 60–70% Kraschel: 40–50% 50–60% 60–70%
Governor before election
Nelson G. Kraschel
Democratic
Elected Governor
George A. Wilson
Republican

The 1938 Iowa gubernatorial election was held on November 8, 1938. Republican nominee George A. Wilson defeated Democratic incumbent Nelson G. Kraschel with 52.71% of the vote.

== General election ==
=== Candidates ===
Major party candidates

- George A. Wilson, Republican
- Nelson G. Kraschel, Democratic

Other candidates

- Wallace M. Short, Farmer–Labor
- John F. Wirds, Progressive
- J. Alvin Mitchell, Prohibition

=== Results ===
1938 Iowa gubernatorial election
| Party | Candidate | Votes | % | ±% |
|---|---|---|---|---|
| Republican | George A. Wilson | 447,061 | 52.71% | |
| Democratic | Nelson G. Kraschel (incumbent) | 387,779 | 45.72% | |
| Farmer–Labor | Wallace M. Short | 10,186 | 1.20% | |
| Progressive party | John F. Wirds | 2,097 | 0.25% | |
| Prohibition | J. Alvin Mitchell | 1,108 | 0.13% | |
| Majority | | 59,282 | | |
| Turnout | | | | |
| Republican gain from Democratic | | Swing | | |
