= 1936 Iowa gubernatorial election =

- November 3, 1936
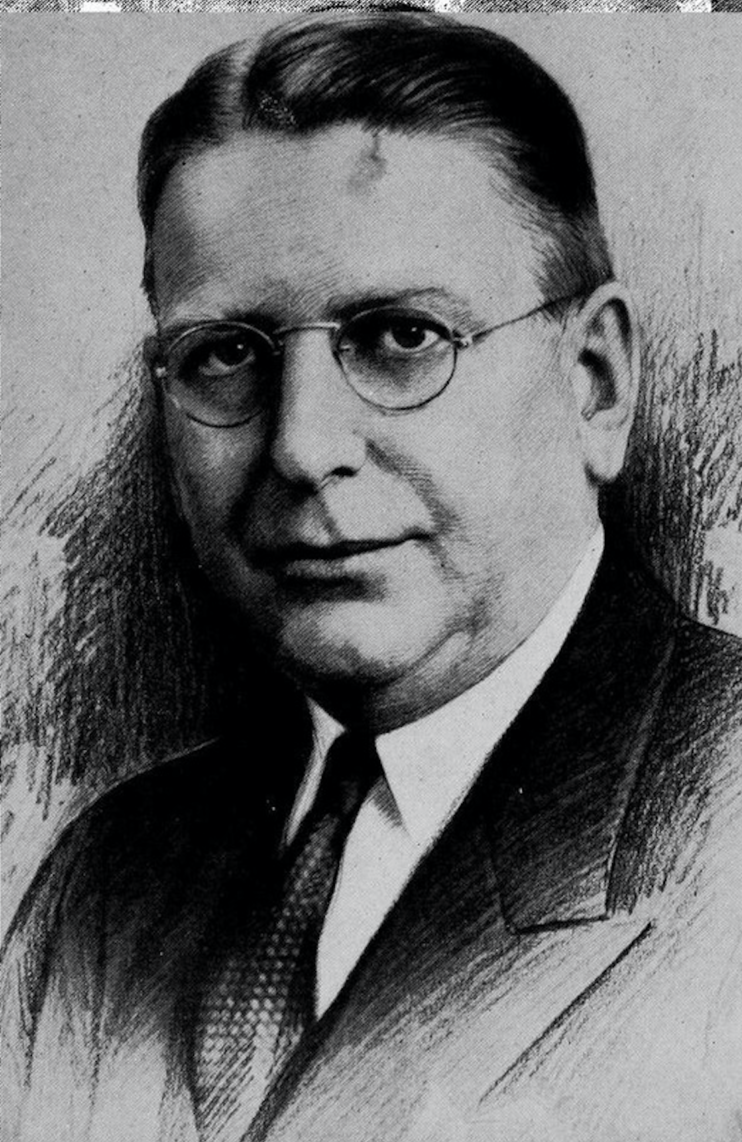

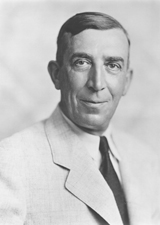
Nominee	Nelson G. Kraschel	George A. Wilson
Party	Democratic	Republican
Popular vote	524,178	521,747
Percentage	48.56%	48.33%
- County results Kraschel: 40–50% 50–60% 60–70% Wilson: 40–50% 50–60% 60–70%
Governor before election
Clyde L. Herring
Democratic
Elected Governor
Nelson G. Kraschel
Democratic

The 1936 Iowa gubernatorial election was held on November 3, 1936. Democratic nominee Nelson G. Kraschel narrowly defeated Republican nominee George A. Wilson with 48.56% of the vote.

== Primary elections ==
Primary elections were held on June 1, 1936.

=== Democratic primary ===
==== Candidates ====
- Nelson G. Kraschel, incumbent Lieutenant Governor
- Richard F. Mitchell, Associate Justice of the Iowa Supreme Court

==== Results ====
Democratic primary results
Party	Candidate	Votes	%
Democratic	Nelson G. Kraschel	82,791	
Democratic	Richard F. Mitchell	52,481	
Total votes			

=== Republican primary ===
==== Candidates ====
- George A. Wilson, former State Senator
- John M. Grimes
- George R. Call

==== Results ====
Republican primary results
Party	Candidate	Votes	%
Republican	George A. Wilson	112,593	
Republican	John M. Grimes	92,399	
Republican	George R. Call	41,429	
Total votes			

== General election ==
=== Candidates ===
Major party candidates

- Nelson G. Kraschel, Democratic
- George A. Wilson, Republican

Other candidates

- Wallace M. Short, Farmer–Labor
- Ted Fitch, Prohibition
- J. P. Russell, Socialist

=== Results ===
1936 Iowa gubernatorial election
Party	Candidate	Votes	%	±%
Democratic	Nelson G. Kraschel	524,178	48.56%	
Republican	George A. Wilson	521,747	48.33%	
Farmer–Labor	Wallace M. Short	31,438	2.91%	
Prohibition	Ted Fitch	1,159	0.11%	
Socialist	J. P. Russell	970	0.09%	
Majority		2,431		
Turnout		1,079,492		
Democratic hold		Swing		
