= Nelson G. Kraschel =

American politician (1889-1957)

Nelson George Kraschel
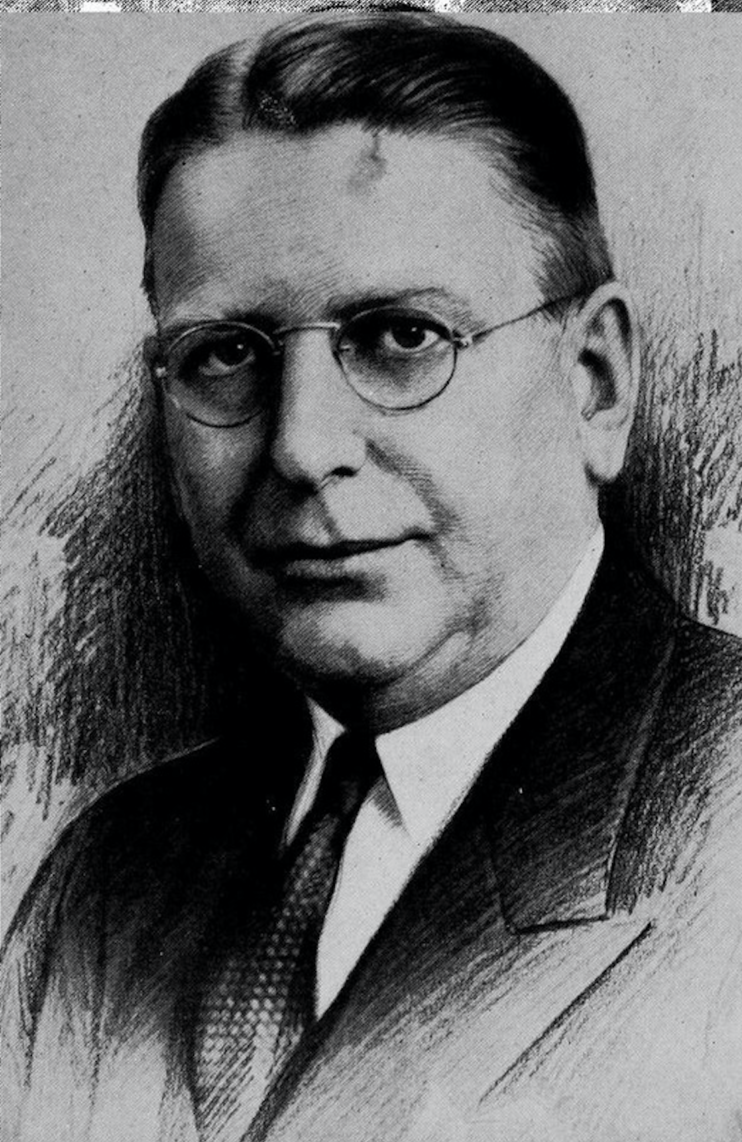

27th Governor of Iowa
- In office January 14, 1937 – January 12, 1939
- Lieutenant: John K. Valentine
- Preceded by: Clyde L. Herring
- Succeeded by: George A. Wilson

27th Lieutenant Governor of Iowa
- In office January 12, 1933 – January 14, 1937
- Governor: Clyde L. Herring
- Preceded by: Arch W. McFarlane
- Succeeded by: John K. Valentine

Personal details
- Born: October 27, 1889 Macon, Illinois, U.S.
- Died: March 15, 1957 (aged 67) Harlan, Iowa, U.S.
- Party: Democratic
- Spouse: Agnes Johnson
- Children: 4

Nelson George Kraschel (October 27, 1889 – March 15, 1957) was an American politician of the Democratic Party who served as the 27th governor of Iowa from 1937 to 1939.

== Early life ==
He was born on a farm near Macon, Illinois, in 1889, the son of Fred K. Kraschel and Nancy Jane (Poe) Kraschel. He farmed from 1906 to 1909, then moved to Harlan in 1910 to become an auctioneer. He farmed and raised livestock. From 1910 to 1930 Kraschel was a livestock auctioneer.

In 1913, he married schoolteacher Agnes Johnson. They had three sons and adopted a daughter.

== Political career ==
=== Early campaigns ===
In 1922, Kraschel ran for election to the 18th district in the Iowa Senate. He ran against Republican Julius A. Nelson. Nelson won with 6,472 votes against Kraschel's 4,749 votes.

In 1932, he lost the primary for the US Senate to Louis Murphy, among others in a crowded primary. Murphy won over 51,000 votes while Kraschel won only just over 18,000 votes.

=== Lieutenant Governor of iowa ===
In 1932, he was the Democratic Party candidate for Lieutenant Governor of Iowa as Clyde L. Herring's running mate. He won the election and was re-elected in 1934.

=== Governor of Iowa ===
He was elected governor in 1936, by less than 2,431 votes. He was the 27th governor of Iowa from 1937 to 1939.

As governor, Kraschel oversaw the institute of a new social welfare board and he vetoed a farm to market road bill.

Kraschel helped to get passed the Homestead Tax Exemption Act, which reduced taxes on citizens by up to $2500. In January 1937, attempted to extend farm debt moratoriums to save farmer's houses due to drought. But the state legislature rejected the extension, letting the previous law expire.

In 1938 Kraschel faced George A. Wilson. He lost by 59,282 votes.

In 1942, he made another, and final, unsuccessful bid for governor.

==== Maytag Strike ====
On July 21, 1938, Kraschel sent the Iowa National Guard to assist at the Maytag Plant in Newton, Iowa, to resolve a labor strike. He declared martial law, saying it was "only for the benefit of the public". Major General Matthew Tinley played a pivotal role in ending the strike, which ended with the return of workers after negotiations about a wage cut. The national guard also had sharpshooters on rooftops to help, armed with "bayoneted rifles, tommy submachine guns, tear gas weapons, and automatic pistols". The national guard left August 3.

Kraschel was involved in political campaigns, such as the Guy Gillette vs. Otha Wearin senatorial contest.

== Later life ==
During World War II. His son, Richard, died when his plane malfunctioned and he jumped out and his parachute failed to launch over Niagara Falls, New York in May 1943 and his other son, Sergeant James Kraschel, died at Okinawa, Japan in a plane crash in September 1945. They had a third son, Major Frederick Kraschel, who served and survived World War II, dying in 2000.

Kraschel died in Harlan, Iowa of a heart attack, in 1957 and he was buried in the Harlan Cemetery in Harlan, Iowa. His wife, Agnes, died in 1983, aged 97, in Harlan, and was buried next to her husband and sons.

Party political offices
Preceded by Clyde L. Herring	Democratic nominee for Governor of Iowa; 1936, 1938	Succeeded by John K. Valentine
Preceded by John K. Valentine	Democratic nominee for Governor of Iowa; 1942	Succeeded by Richard F. Mitchell
Political offices
Preceded by Arch W. McFarlane	Lieutenant Governor of Iowa; 1933–1937	Succeeded by John K. Valentine
Preceded by Clyde L. Herring	Governor of Iowa; January 14, 1937 – January 12, 1939	Succeeded by George A. Wilson
