= Clem F. Kimball =

American politician (1868-1928)

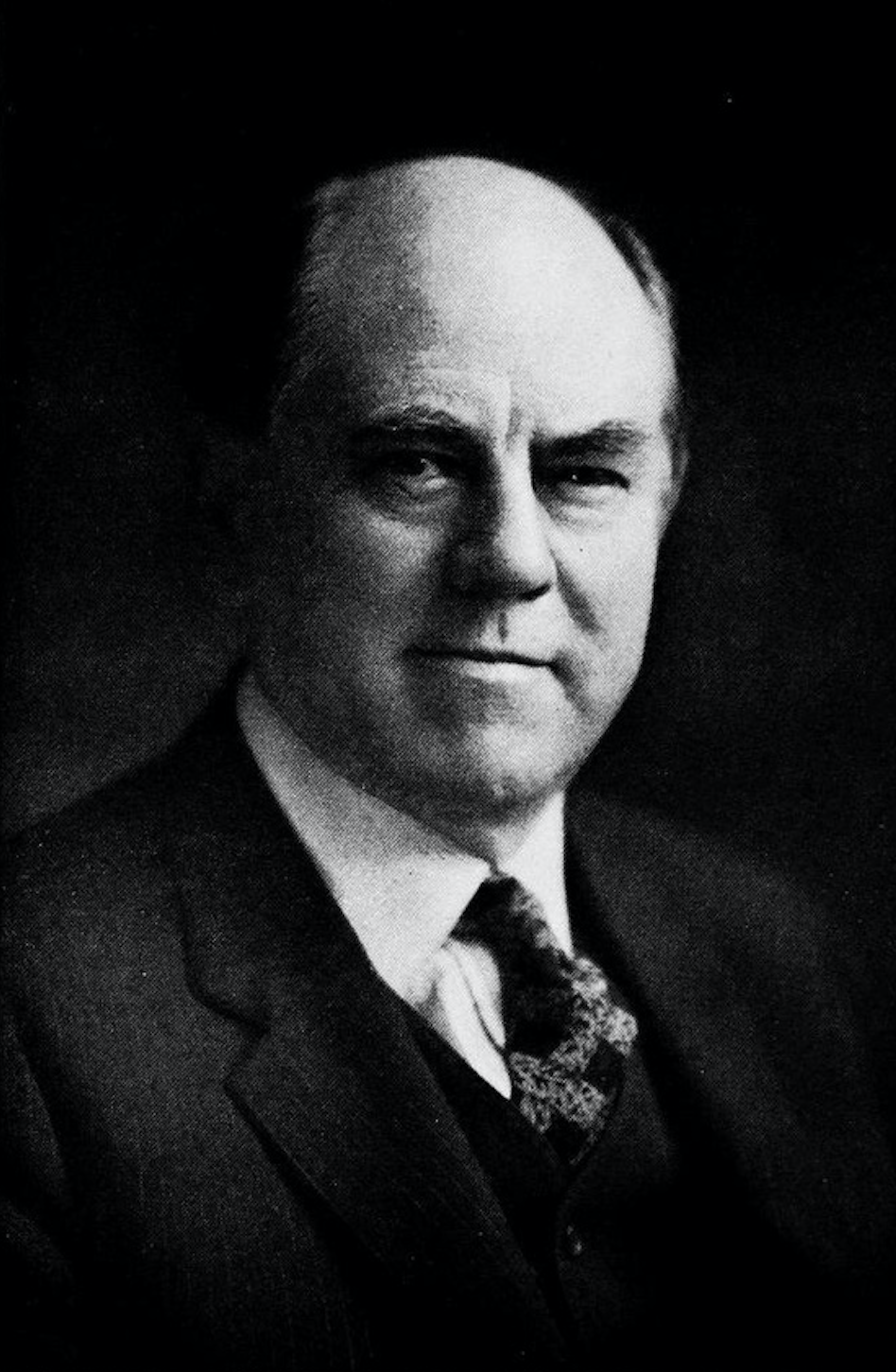

25th Lieutenant Governor of Iowa
- In office 1925 – September 10, 1928
- Governor: John Hammill
- Preceded by: John Hammill
- Succeeded by: Arch W. McFarlane

Member of the Iowa Senate
- In office February 15, 1913 – January 9, 1921
- Constituency: 19th District

Personal details
- Born: September 10, 1868 Anamosa, Iowa, U.S.
- Died: September 10, 1928 (aged 60)
- Education: Iowa State University; University of Michigan Law School

Clement Field Kimball (August 11, 1868 – September 10, 1928) was an American Republican politician and lawyer.

== Biography ==
Born in Anamosa, Iowa, Kimball went to what is now Iowa State University and received his degree in mechanical engineering. After being in business and teaching, Kimball went to University of Michigan and received his law degree. He then went to Council Bluffs, Iowa to practice law. He served in the Iowa State Senate and was Lieutenant Governor of Iowa serving under Governor John Hammill from 1925 until 1928, when he died in office in Council Bluffs.

Political offices
Preceded by John Hammill	Lieutenant Governor of Iowa; 1925–1928	Succeeded by Arch W. McFarlane
