= Conseiller d'État (disambiguation) =

Conseiller d'État ("councillor of state") may refer to:

- Conseiller d'État (France), a high-level government official of administrative law in the Council of State of France
- Conseiller d'Etat, the title of the members of a Conseil d'État (Switzerland), the cantonal government of French-speaking Swiss cantons

== See also ==
- State councillor (disambiguation)
- Conseil d'État (disambiguation)
- State Council (disambiguation)
- Council of State
