= Red Rock Dam (Iowa) =

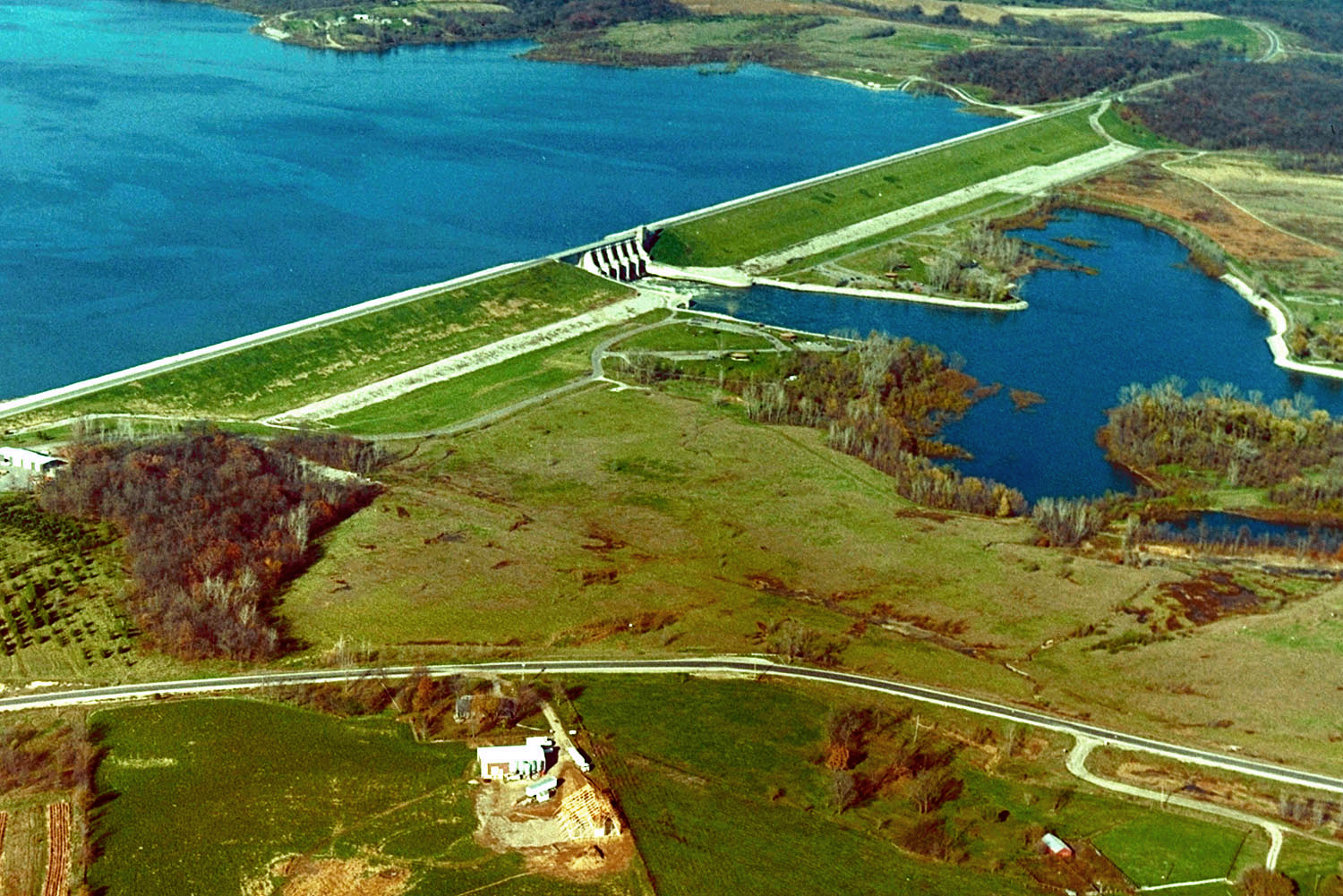
- (Army Corps of Engineers)
- Interactive map of Red Rock Dam
- Official name: Red Rock Dam
- Location: Marion County, Iowa, United States
- Coordinates: 41°22′21″N 92°58′51″W
- Construction began: 1960
- Opening date: 1969
- Construction cost: $88,000,000
- Operators: US Army Corps of Engineers, Rock Island District

Dam and spillways
- Impounds: Des Moines River
- Height: 110 ft (34 m)
- Length: 5,676 ft (1,730 m)
- Width (base): 13.4 ft (4 m) (concrete base)

Reservoir
- Creates: Lake Red Rock
- Total capacity: 114,400 cubic feet (= max outflow)
- Catchment area: 12,320 square miles
- Surface area: 15,250 acres (61.7 km^{2})
- Website; U.S. Army Corps of Engineers, Lake Red Rock Project

Red Rock Dam is a dam in central Iowa, United States, on the Des Moines River, forming Lake Red Rock. It is contained entirely within Marion County. The nearest cities are Pella to the northeast, and Knoxville to the southwest.

The dam consists of a rolled earthfill embankment and a gravity concrete control section. The dam, at crest elevation of 797 feet (243 m) above mean sea level, is about 5,200 feet (1,600 m) long and 95 feet (29 m) high above the flood plain. A compacted impervious cutoff trench to bedrock and a grout curtain in the rock are provided for underseepage control.

It was constructed along with Saylorville Dam as a flood control project by the US Army Corps of Engineers, Rock Island District. Major flooding occurred in 1851, 1859, 1903, 1944, 1947, and 1954. In 1960, the Corps began construction. The project was completed in 1969 at a cost of $88 million. The Army Corps maintains its local offices in Knoxville.

In 2014, work started to retrofit the dam to provide hydro-electric power. At a capacity of 36.4 MW it is estimated that annual energy produced by the project will be 178,000 MWh, or enough to power approximately 18,000 homes. The primary purpose of the dam will remain to manage flood control.

Extensive recreational development along the lakeshore rapidly followed.

It was a key location in the 1972 movie A Thief in the Night and its 1978 sequel A Distant Thunder. Lake Red Rock was named after one of the lost towns under the reservoir, Red Rock.

The dam was supposed to take 3 years to fill but it was filled in 5 days to max capacity due to the prevented flood of 1969.

== See also ==
- Lake Red Rock (Des Moines River)
- Des Moines River
- Saylorville Dam
- Elk Rock State Park
