= Marion County Courthouse (Iowa) =

- U.S. National Register of Historic Places
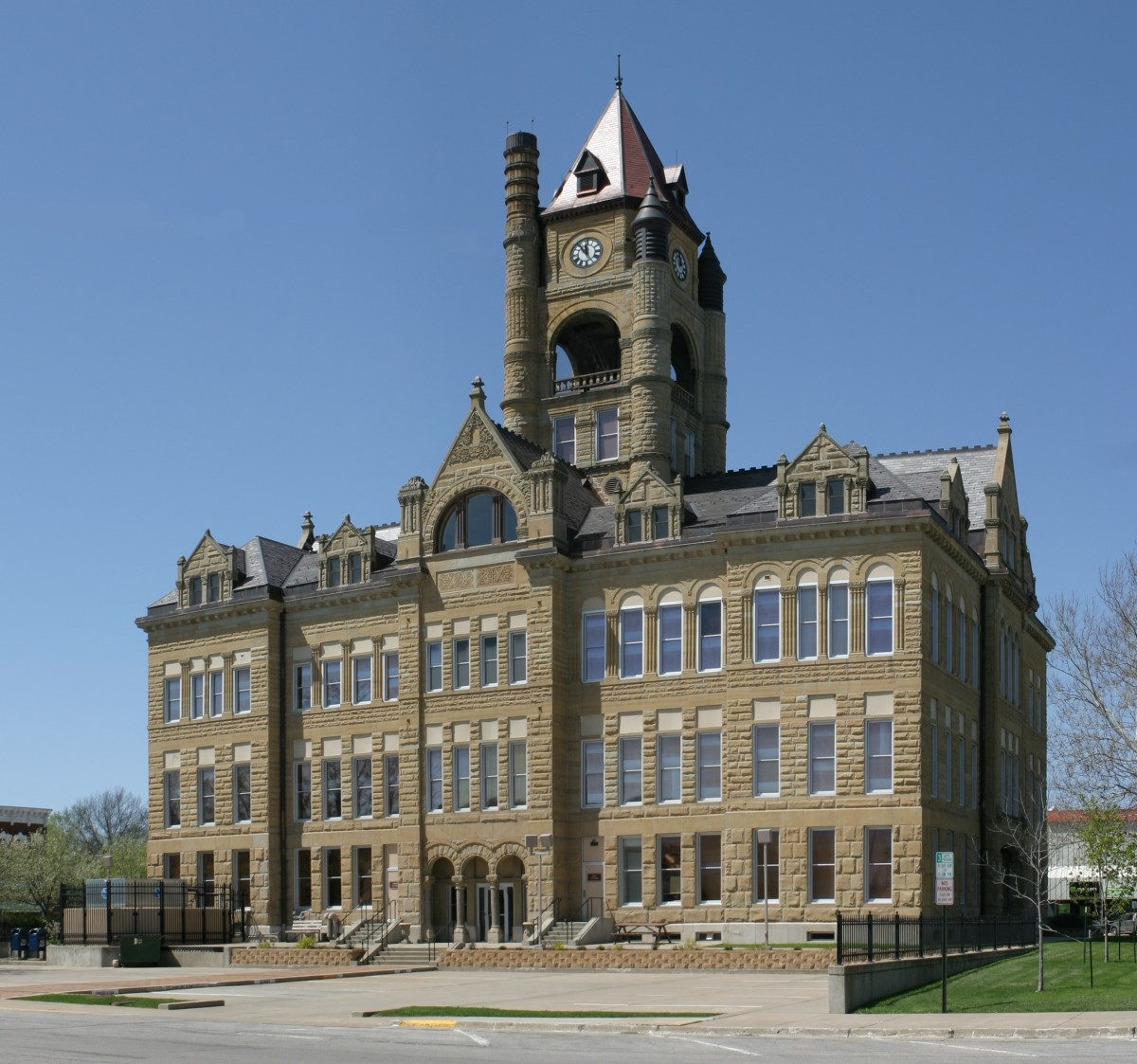

- Location within Iowa Location within the United States
- Interactive map showing the location for Marion County Courthouse
- Location: Main St. Knoxville, Iowa
- Coordinates: 41°19′6″N 93°5′48″W
- Area: less than one acre
- Built: 1896
- Architect: Charles A. Moses; Mifflin E. Bell
- Architectural style: Romanesque
- MPS: County Courthouses in Iowa TR
- NRHP reference No.: 81000256
- Added to NRHP: July 2, 1981

The Marion County Courthouse in Knoxville, Iowa, United States was built in 1896. It was listed on the National Register of Historic Places in 1981 as a part of the County Courthouses in Iowa Thematic Resource. The courthouse is the third building the county has used for court functions and county administration.

== History ==
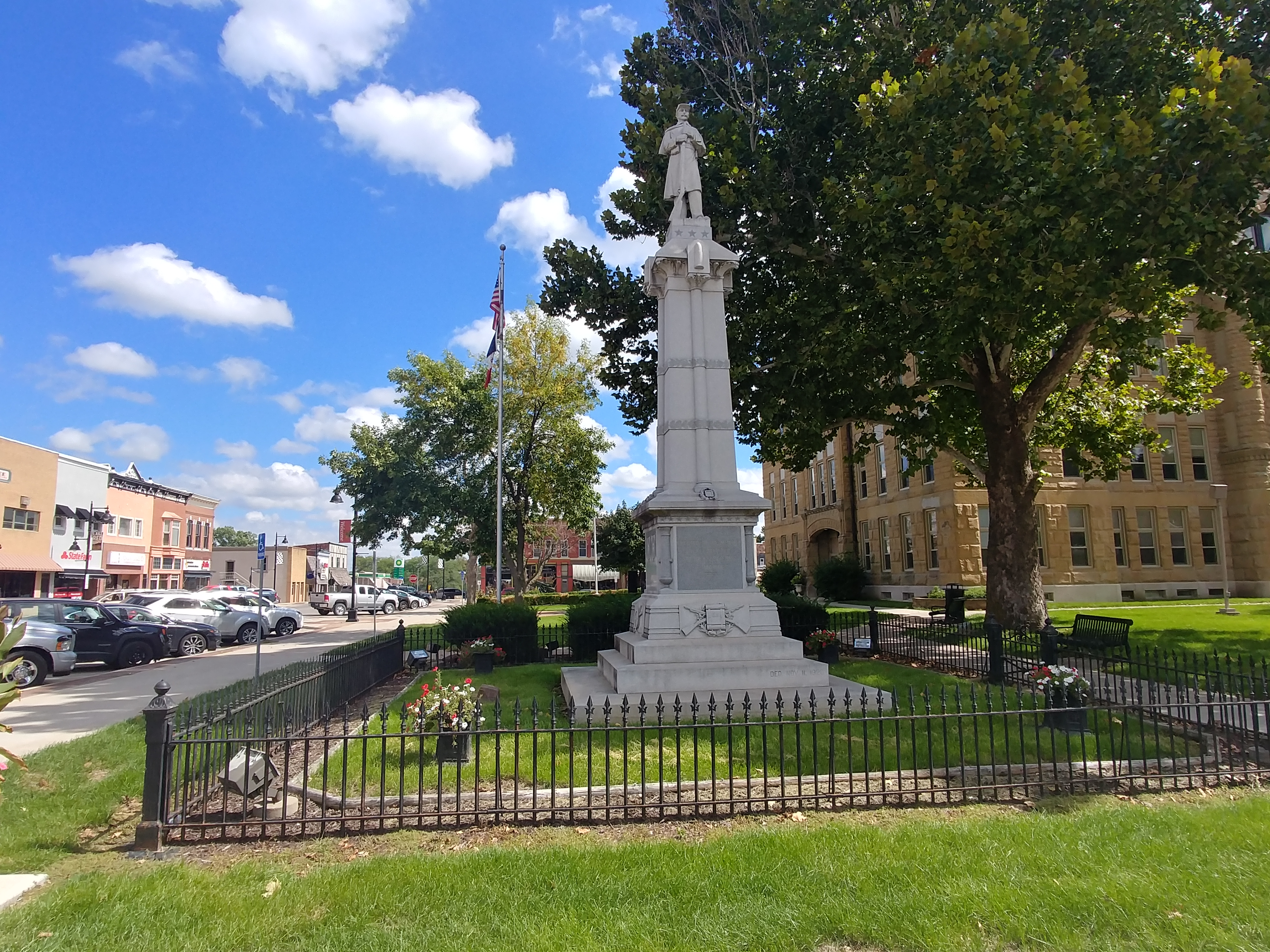
Military monument on the courthouse square.

Marion County was organized in 1845 and its first courthouse was built a year later. It was a frame building that was constructed for $700. It also served the community as a school and a church. After 12 years the county sold the building for $928, and the second courthouse was built in 1857 for around $20,000. It was a two-story brick structure that measured 48 by 70 feet (15 m × 21 m). It stood in the center of the public square and housed county offices on the first floor and a courtroom on the second floor. The second courthouse was used for 40 years until it was declared unsafe to use. The present courthouse was designed by Mifflin E. Bell in the Romanesque Revival style. It was completed in 1896 at a cost of $80,000. The courthouse's significance is derived from its association with county government, and the political power and prestige of Knoxville as the county seat.

A monument that was "Erected to the memory of the soldiers, sailors and marines of all wars" was built on the northwest corner of the courthouse square and dedicated on November 11, 1920. The 25-foot (7.6 m) granite shaft is capped with Union soldier from the Civil War. It is located where 40 soldiers enlisted under a tree on February 4, 1863. There is also a case in the courthouse that contains artifacts from the Civil War. There is another monument on the square to Knoxville resident Dixie Cornell Gebhardt, who designed the flag of the state of Iowa.

== Architecture ==
The three-story structure is a simplified version of the Richardsonian Romanesque style. The exterior is composed of sandstone. The central pavilion features corner turrets and patterned stonework. The main entrance is recessed in the pavilion behind triple bynian arches that are supported by granite columns. The building overall is capped with a gable roof, but the two end pavilions are capped with a hipped roof. Stone dormers line the edges of the roofline. The structure is surmounted by a large central tower with an open bell chamber, a four-faced clock, and an octagon shaped spire. One of the corner turrets on the tower doubles as a chimney stack.
