= François le Vasseur, Lord of Moriensart =

Politician of the Southern Netherlands

François le Vasseur, Lord of Moriensart and Over-Heembeeke+ Brussels, 16/3/1603 was a politician of the Southern Netherlands.

He was the son of Guillaume le Vaisseur, who was in service of King FelipeII as Receveur général of Artois.

== Career ==
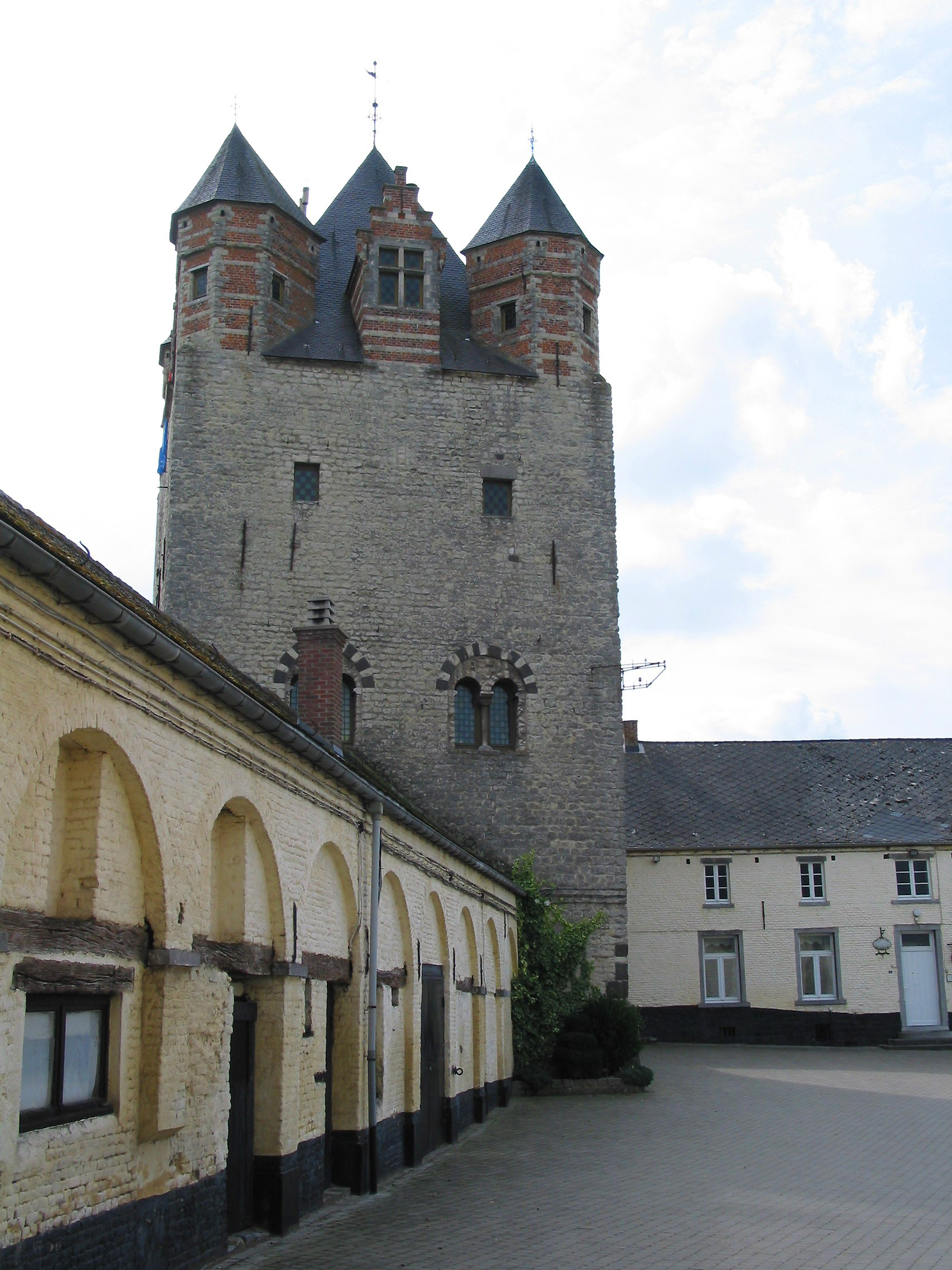
Moriensart Castle

He was the Secretary of the Privy council (1574), the Council of state (1581) and member of the Council of war. He was named greffe of the Order of the Golden Fleece in 1572. By request of King Philip II of Spain he was knighted in 1582 for his loyal merit.

He resided in Moriensart castle inherited from his father; the dominium of Moriensart was in Ottignies.
