= Red Rock Dam =

Red Rock Dam is the name of at least two dams in the United States:

- Red Rock Dam (Arizona), a dam in the Kofa National Wildlife Refuge in La Paz County, Arizona
- Red Rock Dam (Iowa), a dam on the Des Moines River in Marion County, Iowa
