= State councillor (disambiguation) =

State Councillor or State Counsellor may refer to:

- State councillor (China), a vice-premier level member of the State Council of China
- Counselor of State (Finland) or Valtioneuvos, title awarded to elder statesmen
- Councillor of State (France) or Conseiller d'État, member of the French Conseil d'État, high administrative court
- State Counsellor of Myanmar, a former position within the Government of Myanmar
- State Councillor (Russia), a high civil rank in Imperial Russia
  - The State Counsellor, the seventh novel in the Erast Fandorin series by Boris Akunin
  - The State Counsellor (film), a 2005 Russian film based on the novel
- Counsellor of State (United Kingdom), individuals to whom the monarch delegates certain state functions and powers

== See also ==
- Counselor of the United States Department of State
- State Council (disambiguation)
- Council of State
- Conseiller d'État (disambiguation)
