= Howard B. Myers =

American economist

Howard B. Myers (February 13, 1901 – March 9, 1956) was an American statistician and economist who held executive posts with several agencies during the New Deal. His work was key in developing the techniques used to measure unemployment.

== Family and education ==
Myers was born in Knoxville, Iowa in 1901. He earned his undergraduate degree from Washburn University in 1923 where he was a member of the Kansas Beta chapter of the Phi Delta Theta fraternity. In 1922 he was inducted with five other juniors into the school's prestigious Sagamore Society. From Washburn he went to the University of Chicago where he earned a doctorate in economics.

In 1927 Myers married Bernice Curry. Together they had three children, Ann Curry, Howard Barton and Robert Burris. All three of Myers' brothers, Robert, Donald and Louis, were graduates of Washburn where all three were also members of Phi Delta Theta.

== Early career ==
Myers worked as a research assistant at the University of Chicago from 1923 to 1927. Then, after being awarded his PhD, he was an assistant professor there for two years.

In 1929, he left Chicago to become the director of research and statistics for the Illinois State Labor Department. With the Great Depression weighing on the economy, in 1932 he added a second state position when he assumed a role with Illinois State Emergency Relief Commission.

== Government service ==
Myers left Illinois in 1933 to join FDR's New Deal. According to Dr. Myer's obituary in the New York Times, his appointment was unusual because of his free market ideals. "Through the years he held firm to the belief that 'government controls over the economy are undesirable except in periods of sudden and grave emergency.' Sound budgetary policy...was far more effective than Government controls over prices, production, wages and profits."

His first posting was as assistant director in charge of the Federal Emergency Relief Administration. He was next assistant director in charge of social research at the Works Progress Administration. In 1942, with World War II raging, Myers served as assistant chief of the Works Progress Administrations' munitions branch.

== Post-government work ==
In 1943, Myers became affiliated with the Committee for Economic Development (CED). The CED is a private non-profit group of business and economic leaders encouraging policies that promote economic growth. In 1949, after six years as an associate director, he became the director of research. During his time as director, the CED helped American industry convert from its wartime footing to help meet the demands of the post-war economic boom.

Myers was a fellow of the American Statistical Association, a member of the American Economic Association and the American Industrial Labor Relations Association.

In March 1955, Myers died at the National Institute of Health in Bethesda, Maryland.
