= State Council =

State Council may refer to:

== Government ==
- State Council of China, the national cabinet and chief administrative authority of China, headed by the Premier
- State Council, the national cabinet of South Korea, headed by the President
- Council of State of Norway, the Cabinet of Norway, led by the Prime Minister of Norway.

== Legislature ==
- State Council of Crimea, the legislative branch of the Republic of Crimea

== Advisory body ==
- State Council (Russia), advisory body to the President of Russia

== Former organizations ==
- State Council of the Soviet Union, the chief administrative authority in the final days of the Union of Soviet Socialist Republics (USSR)
- State Council of the Republic of China (中華民國國務院), the chief executive authority and national cabinet of the Beijing-based Beiyang government of the Republic of China
- State Council of the Republic of China, the supreme authority of the Nanjing-based national government of the Republic of China
- Council of State, highest constitutional organ of state power of the Socialist Republic of the Union of Burma (Myanmar)
- State Law and Order Restoration Council (1988-1997), State Peace and Development Council (1997-2011), the military regimes of Myanmar
- Iowa State Council for Defense, the council that approved the official state flag of Iowa
- State Council (Brunei), former legislative body established under the Supplementary Treaty of 1905/1906
- State Council of Ceylon, the legislative body created in colonial Ceylon (present-day Sri Lanka) under the Donoughmore Constitution
- State Council of the Russian Empire, the supreme state advisory body to the Tsar in Imperial Russia
- State Council of Joseon, the highest organ of government under the Joseon Dynasty of Korea
- State Council (German-Austria), the executive leadership of the Republic of German-Austria, established in the last days of World War I
- State Council of East Germany, the collective head of state in East Germany from 1960 to 1990.
- State Council of the Principality of Bulgaria, an organ established by the Second Grand National Assembly that lasted during Alexander's period of authoritarian rule (1881-1883)
- State Council of the People's Republic of Bulgaria, the highest organ of government in the People's Republic of Bulgaria from 1971 to 1990.
- State National Council, a communist-controlled, parliament-like body formed in the late stages of the Second World War in German-occupied Warsaw
- State Council of Romania, the supreme executive authority of the Socialist Republic of Romania from 1961 to 1989.
- State Council of Slovakia, the upper house of the parliament of the Slovak State (1939–1945)

In military:

- State Defense Council, the military committee of the Chechen Republic of Ichkeria

In other fields:

- New York State Council on the Arts, an arts council serving the U.S. state of New York
- Old North State Council, a local council of the Boy Scouts of America that serves the western Piedmont Triad region of North Carolina
- Seventh-day Adventist Church State Council, a non-profit organization that works to preserve and promote religious freedom

== See also ==
- Council of State
- National Council (disambiguation)
- State councillor (disambiguation)
- State Counsel
