= Lafayette Young =

American politician (1848–1926)

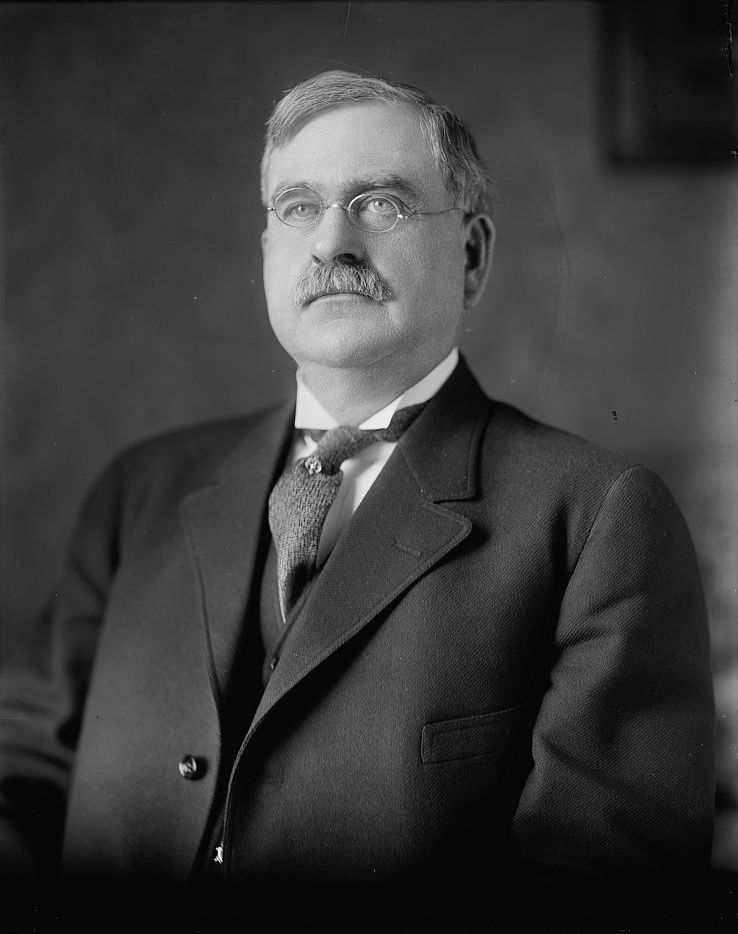

United States Senator from Iowa
- In office November 12, 1910 – April 11, 1911
- Appointed by: Beryl F. Carroll
- Preceded by: Jonathan P. Dolliver
- Succeeded by: William S. Kenyon

Member of the Iowa Senate
- In office January 12, 1874 – January 8, 1882
- In office January 11, 1886 – January 12, 1890
- Constituency: 17th District (1874-1878); 18th District (1878-1882)(1886-1890)

Personal details
- Born: May 10, 1848 Eddyville, Iowa, US
- Died: November 15, 1926 (aged 78) Des Moines, Iowa, US
- Party: Republican

Lafayette "Lafe" Young (May 10, 1848 – November 15, 1926) was a newspaper reporter and editor, and a Republican Senator from Iowa.

== Early life and education ==
Young was born in Monroe County, Iowa. His early education was acquired in the public schools and in printing offices at Albia, Iowa and Des Moines, Iowa. His first business establishment was a newspaper in Atlantic, Iowa, which he named the Telegraph.

== Career ==
In 1873, he was elected as a Republican to a seat in the Iowa State Senate representing Adair, Cass, Adams and Union counties, and was re-elected in 1877, and (after a four-year absence) in 1885. In all, he served in the Iowa Senate from 1874 to 1882, and 1886 to 1888.

In 1890 Young moved to Des Moines and purchased a daily newspaper known as the Daily Iowa Capital or (after 1901) the Des Moines Capital. In 1893, Young was an unsuccessful candidate for the Republican nomination for Governor of Iowa, losing to Frank D. Jackson. He served as a war correspondent during the Spanish–American War.

When Iowa Senator Jonathan P. Dolliver died suddenly in October 1910, Young was appointed by Iowa Governor Beryl F. Carroll as Dolliver's immediate replacement. Soon after his appointment, his position was up for election in the 1911 Iowa General Assembly, where the Republicans held a large majority but were deeply divided among a long list of candidates for Young's seat. The inability of any candidate to receive the required majority of 76 legislators forced the General Assembly to re-vote each morning of the session. Young was the principal Republican opponent of Fort Dodge attorney William S. Kenyon until the 23rd ballot, when Young lost most of his support to other candidates. Kenyon was ultimately elected on the final day of the session on the 67th ballot. In all, Young served in the U.S. Senate from November 1910 to April 1911.

After his Senate service, Young returned to Des Moines and his newspaper. He again became a war correspondent, travelling to southeastern Europe in 1913 to cover the Second Balkan War. In 1915, he again returned to Europe, this time to assess the early stages of World War I (before the United States' entry). During that trip he was detained in Innsbruck by Austria-Hungary, but was later released.

After the United States declared war in 1917, he was appointed chairman of the Iowa State Council for Defense. As the Council's chairman, Young urged that "disloyal" persons should be impoverished and imprisoned, arguing that "[a]ny man who has lived under the protection of our laws and has accumulated wealth and is now disloyal should be deprived of every dollar he possesses and he should be interned in a stockade until the end of the war and at that time his fate should be considered carefully." He also campaigned against the teaching of any foreign language in any public school or college, and for the imposition of English literacy tests for voting.

In recognition of his work in raising funds in Iowa for the children of Belgium, Young was made a Knight of the Order of Leopold II of Belgium. He continued to edit his newspaper until his death in Des Moines on November 15, 1926. His wife Josephine died 5 weeks later of heart disease. They are interred in Des Moines' Woodland Cemetery.

U.S. Senate
Preceded by Jonathan P. Dolliver	U.S. senator from Iowa; 1910–1911	Succeeded by William S. Kenyon
