= Flag of Iowa =

U.S. state flag

Iowa
- Use: Civil and state flag
- Proportion: Not specified
- Adopted: March 29, 1921; 105 years ago (Modification in 2018; 8 years ago)
- Design: A vertical tricolor of blue, white, and red. The center stripe contains a spreading eagle holding in its beak a blue ribbon bearing the state motto above the word Iowa in red.
- Designed by: Dixie Cornell Gebhardt

The flag of the U.S. state of Iowa is a vertical tricolor flag designed by Dixie Cornell Gebhardt in 1917. Iowa legislators officially adopted the flag in 1921.

It is one of nine U.S. state flags to feature an eagle, alongside those of Illinois, Michigan, Missouri, New York, North Dakota, Oregon, Pennsylvania and Wyoming. The eagle carrying streamers in its beak also features on the Iowa state seal.

== Design and specifications ==
=== Statute ===
The 2025 Iowa Code, § 1B.1 defines that the flag consists of:

"three vertical stripes of blue, white, and red, the blue stripe being nearest the staff and the white stripe being in the center. On the central white stripe is depicted a spreading eagle bearing in its beak blue streamers on which is inscribed the state motto, 'Our liberties we prize and our rights we will maintain' in white letters, with the word 'Iowa' in red letters below the streamers."

An editor's note appended to the section states that the width of the middle white panel of the original flag was "about equal" to the sum of the widths of the red and blue bars.

=== Symbolism ===
Cornell Gebhardt assigned meaning to each color of the flag: blue represents loyalty, justice, and truth; white stands for purity; red symbolizes courage. The Des Moines Register suggested that the design hearkens back to Iowa's history as a French territory, with both flags containing blue, white and red from left to right, though Iowa's banner has a wider white section. The Register also stated that the word "Iowa" written in red symbolizes the "Iowa soldier [writing] in letters of blood on the white page of history his unalterable determination to defend the ideals represented by the banner and its wonderful motto."

=== Usage ===
The banner is only to be used in official representation of the state of Iowa or in distinction between citizens of different states. The flag should always be flown below and "subservient" to the flag of the United States, while being provided and raised by public officers. Schools must fly the banner when classes are in session, and public buildings may fly the banner on secular days.

== History ==
=== Pre-official flags (before 1921) ===
The State of Iowa did not have a flag for the first 75 years of its existence, largely due to calls for national unity during and after the American Civil War. Only regimental banners bearing state insignia.

Beginning in the late 19th century, several designs intended to represent the state began to appear. These flags were unofficial, as none were adopted into law. Various proposals were also put forward, but none advanced to formal adoption.

As part of ceremonial arrangements for the Iowa National Guard's participation in the 1893 World's Fair in Chicago, General Greene ordered a state flag to accompany governor Horace Boies and his staff. The flag was produced by the M. C. Lilly Co. of Columbus and designed by General James R. Lincoln, Inspector General of Iowa. It was described as a square flag made of white silk, embroidered in gold, featuring the state coat of arms and the state's name on one side and a hawk's head on the other. Years later, in 1909, a request from the manager of the World Building in New York for an Iowa state flag revealed that Iowa had no officially adopted state flag. Though National Guard members would claim the white-and-gold ceremonial flag as official.

In 1908, Charles Denby, the American Consul-General in Shanghai, China, formally requested that Governor Garst provide a state flag and a copy of the state coat of arms on canvas. The request was made on behalf of the American company of the Shanghai Volunteer Corps, a unit of sixty American citizens that was part of a larger multinational volunteer organization responsible for protecting the foreign settlement in the city. The flag was intended for use on ceremonial occasions, particularly at the company's annual Washington's Birthday ball. However, no flag could be delivered, as Iowa did not have an official state flag at the time. This prompted a proposal for the legislature to appoint a commission or committee to design an official flag and to revise or replace the state seal, which was considered outdated and lacking in artistic quality, with the goal of creating two visually coordinated symbols.

On February 26, 1910, a flag described as "the only 'state flag' Iowa ever had" was returned to the military establishment in Des Moines after having been kept for several years by the Iowa Society of New York. The flag was described as a blue and white triangle, adorned with silver and gold stars and elaborately hand-painted. Its origins and the significance of its unusual design were unknown, though it was said to have been made for a previous governor "some years ago."

In 1910, the minutes of a meeting of the newly formed Iowa National Guard advisory board noted that the adoption of a state flag was addressed, and that General James R. Lincoln was commissioned to create a design to be submitted to the next legislative session. The flag Lincoln had produced during Governor Boies's administration was not considered adequate, although a flag made from that design had remained on display in the statehouse. Lincoln intended for the new design to be based on an earlier concept created per request from Governor Boies, though incorporating slight modifications he had long been considering. This earlier concept had featured a white outer field with thirteen stars in the corners representing the original colonies, a wide blue border containing forty-six gold stars for the then-current states and ninety-nine white stars representing Iowa's counties, and a central field displaying the state coat of arms on one side and a hawk's head on the other.

It was not until World War I that the creation of another state flag was requested, recorded first by the Iowa Daughters of the American Revolution (DAR).

Iowa National Guardsmen positioned along the Mexican border made several requests for a flag, as other states had flags to represent themselves.

In 1917, Iowa was one of three states that had no flag.

=== Current flag (1921–present) ===
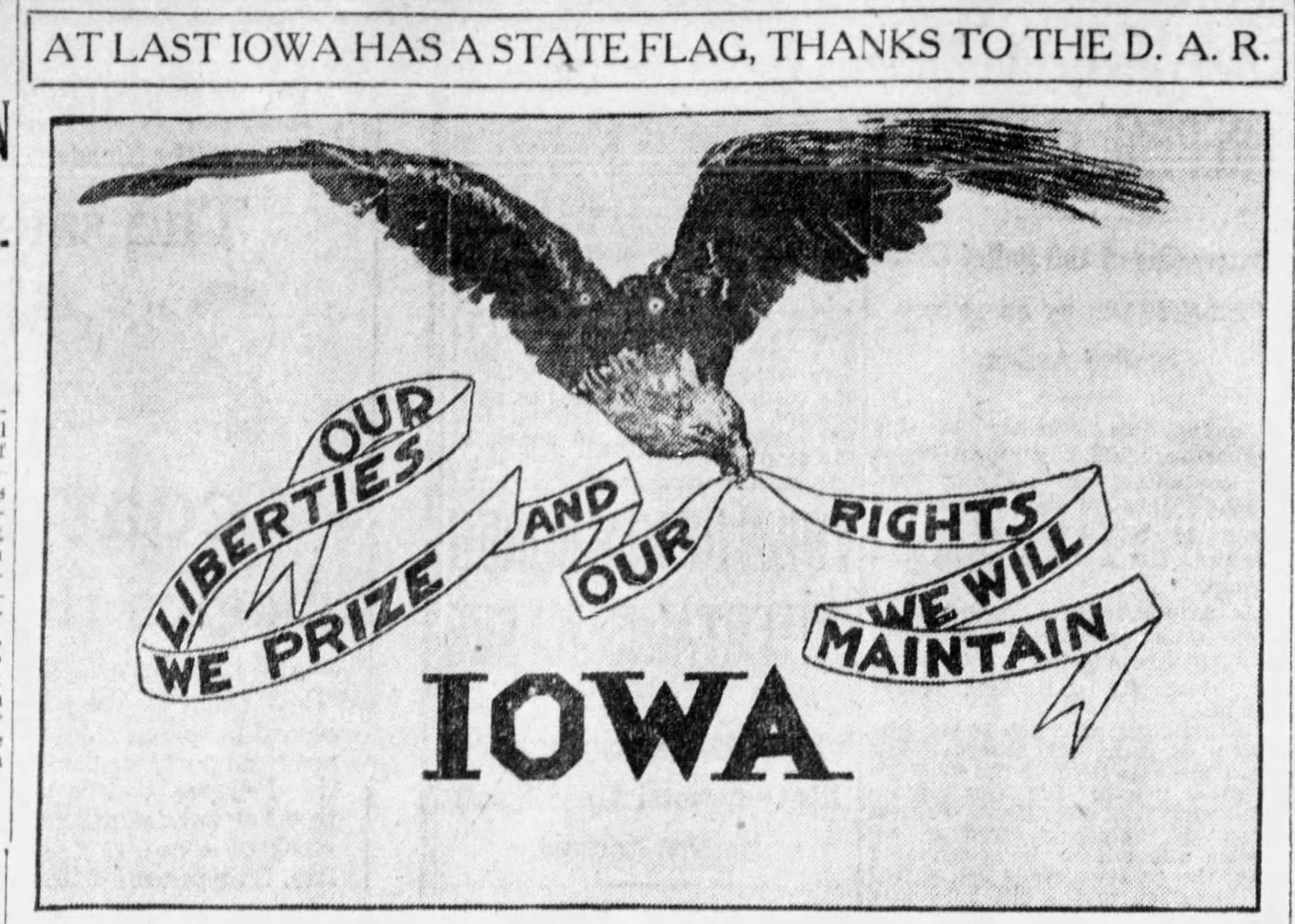
An early rendition of Iowa's flag, pictured in the Des Moines Register on May 12, 1917.

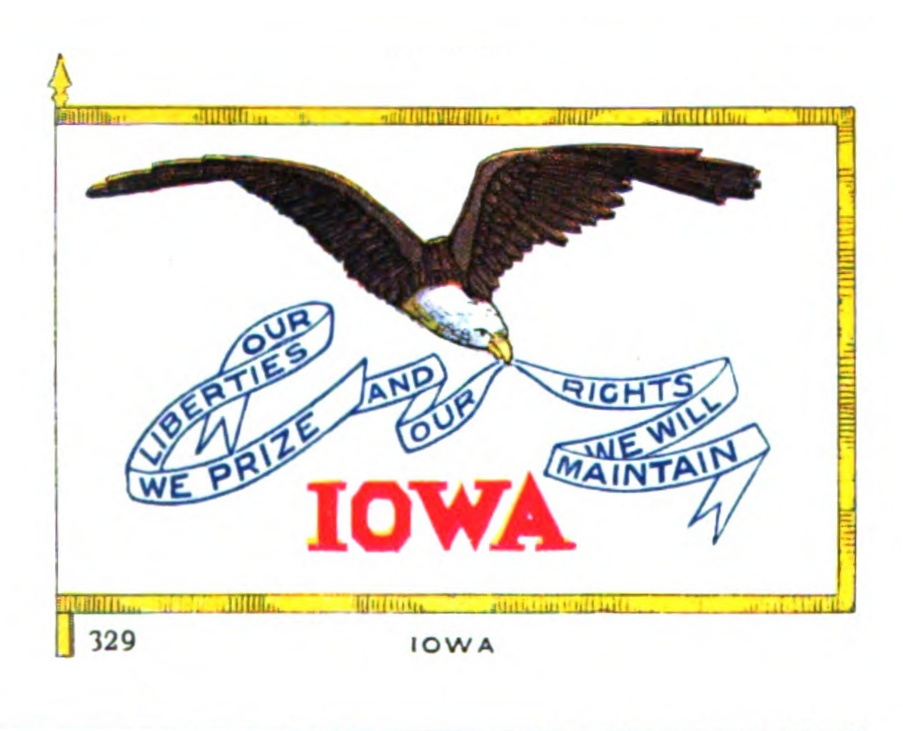
1917 state flag in full color

Recreation of the flag from 1917

The flag was designed by DAR member and Knoxville, Iowa, resident Dixie Cornell Gebhardt, who was prompted to create the design by Iowa guardsmen. It was approved by the DAR flag committee in early May 1917 and presented to the Iowa State Council for Defense, where it was accepted on May 11, 1917. The flag was sent to Iowa troops for designation but would not be officially adopted as the state flag for nearly four more years. It cost $800 (around $20,248.50 today) to make 10 state flags for each Iowa regiment. One of the state flags given by the 3rd Iowa Infantry had name "IOWA" in gold and red. Another state flag was given to the Rainbow Division in 1918.

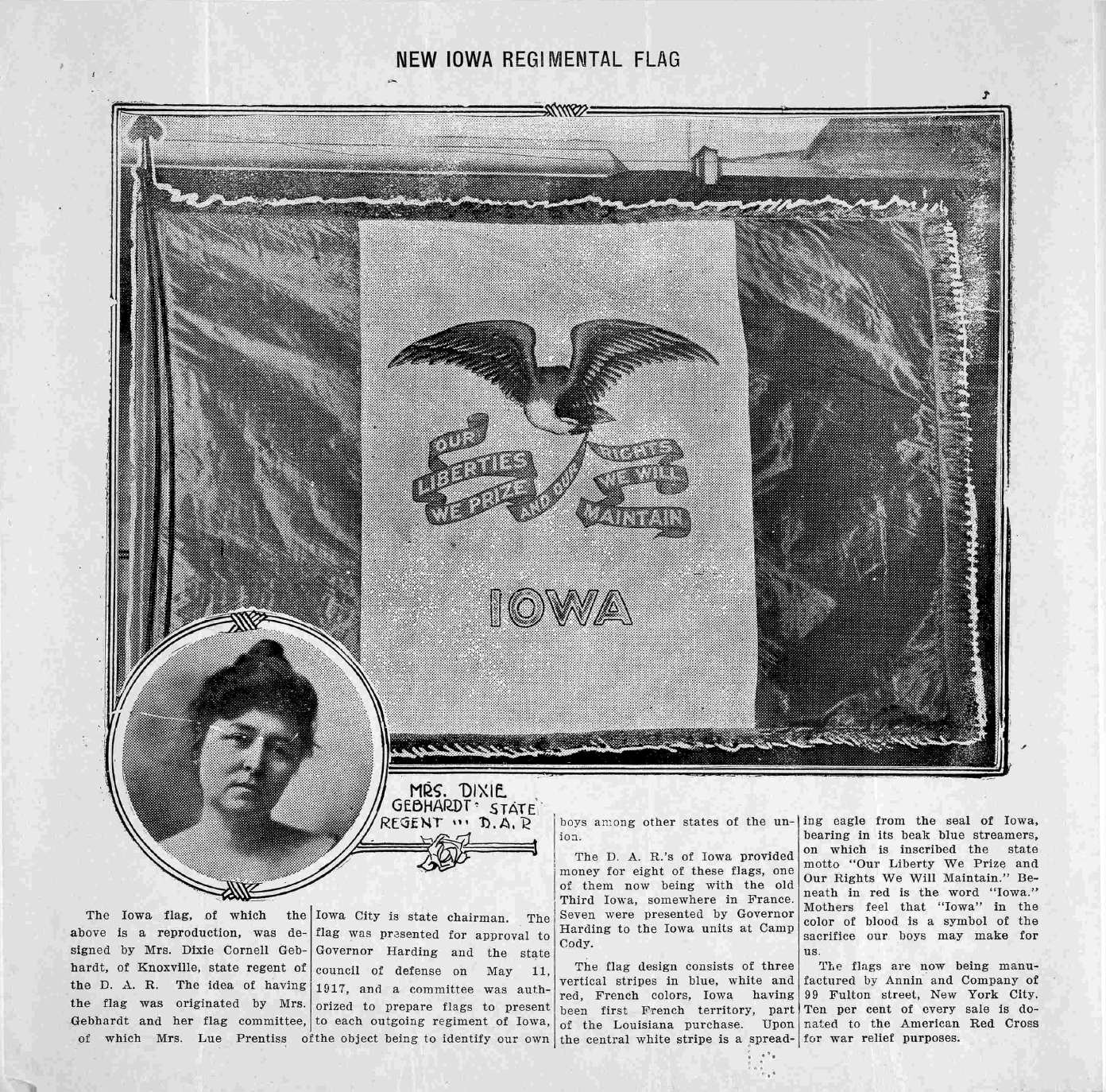
Dixie Cornell Gebhardt and her flag, 1918

Iowa governor William Lloyd Harding formally accepted the flag on behalf of the state on March 19, 1918, but legislative action on adoption failed in February 1919. Still, the Iowa Daughters met with legislators urging them to accept the flag again in September 1920, suggesting that past failures were caused by high expenses.

Despite not being adopted, the flag was used often throughout the country to represent Iowa, notably in Continental Hall where it was among official flags of other states, though marked as unofficial. This was all the more reason to adopt the flag officially, according to the wife of congressman Horace Mann Towner.

Finally, in January 1921, Iowa legislators again deliberated on the adoption of an official flag, and by mid-March of that same year, the flag was accepted as law.

In 2001, a survey conducted by the North American Vexillological Association placed Iowa's flag 42nd in design quality out of the 72 Canadian provincial, U.S. state and U.S. territorial flags ranked.

== Gallery ==
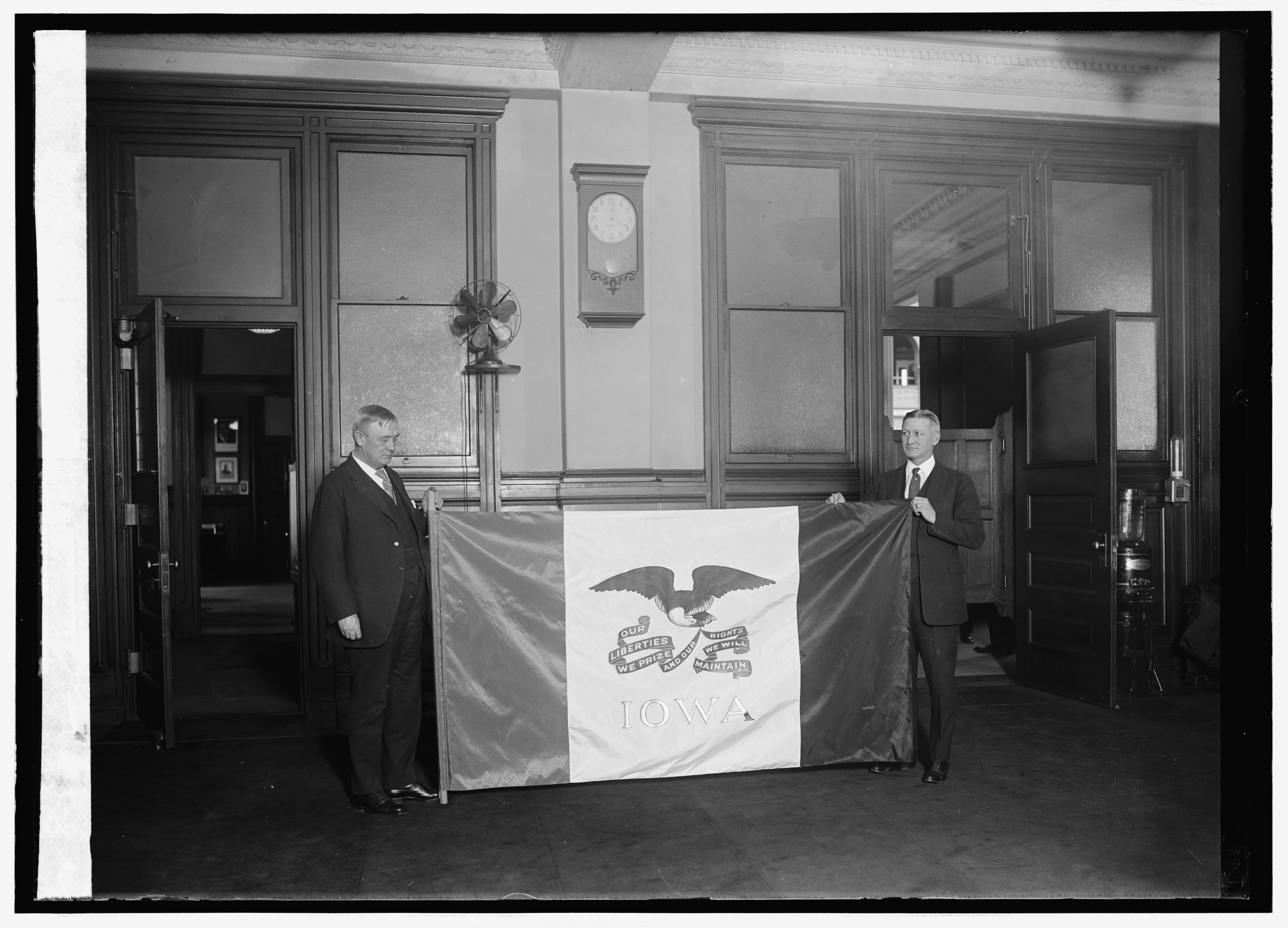
Presentation of the state flag at an unknown event, January 2, 1924

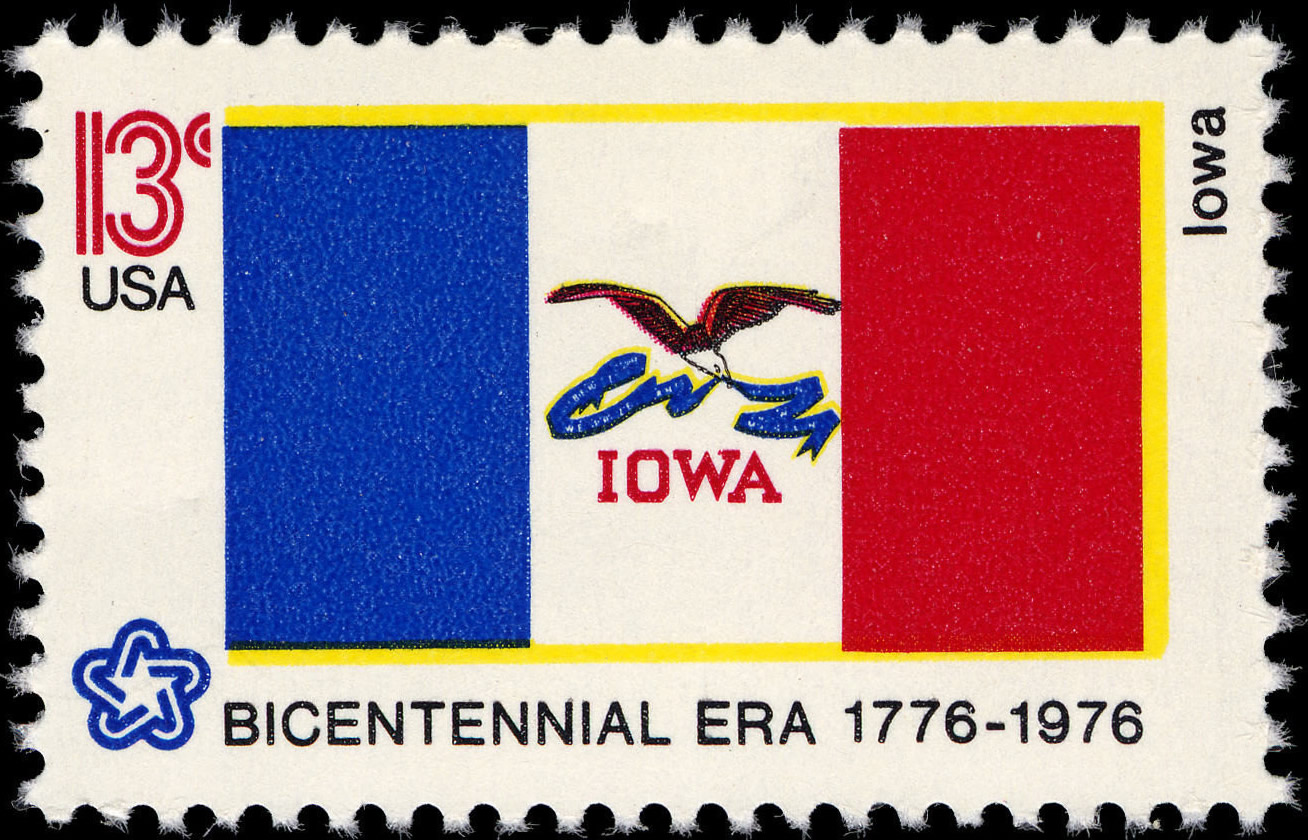
The Iowa state flag as depicted in the 1976 bicentennial postage stamp series

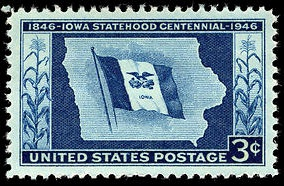
A stamp featuring the state flag to commemorate the 100th anniversary of Iowa's statehood

Iowa state seal

== See also ==
- Flag of Des Moines, Iowa
- List of Iowa state symbols
- Seal of Iowa
