= Saylorville Dam =

Dam in Polk County, Iowa, US

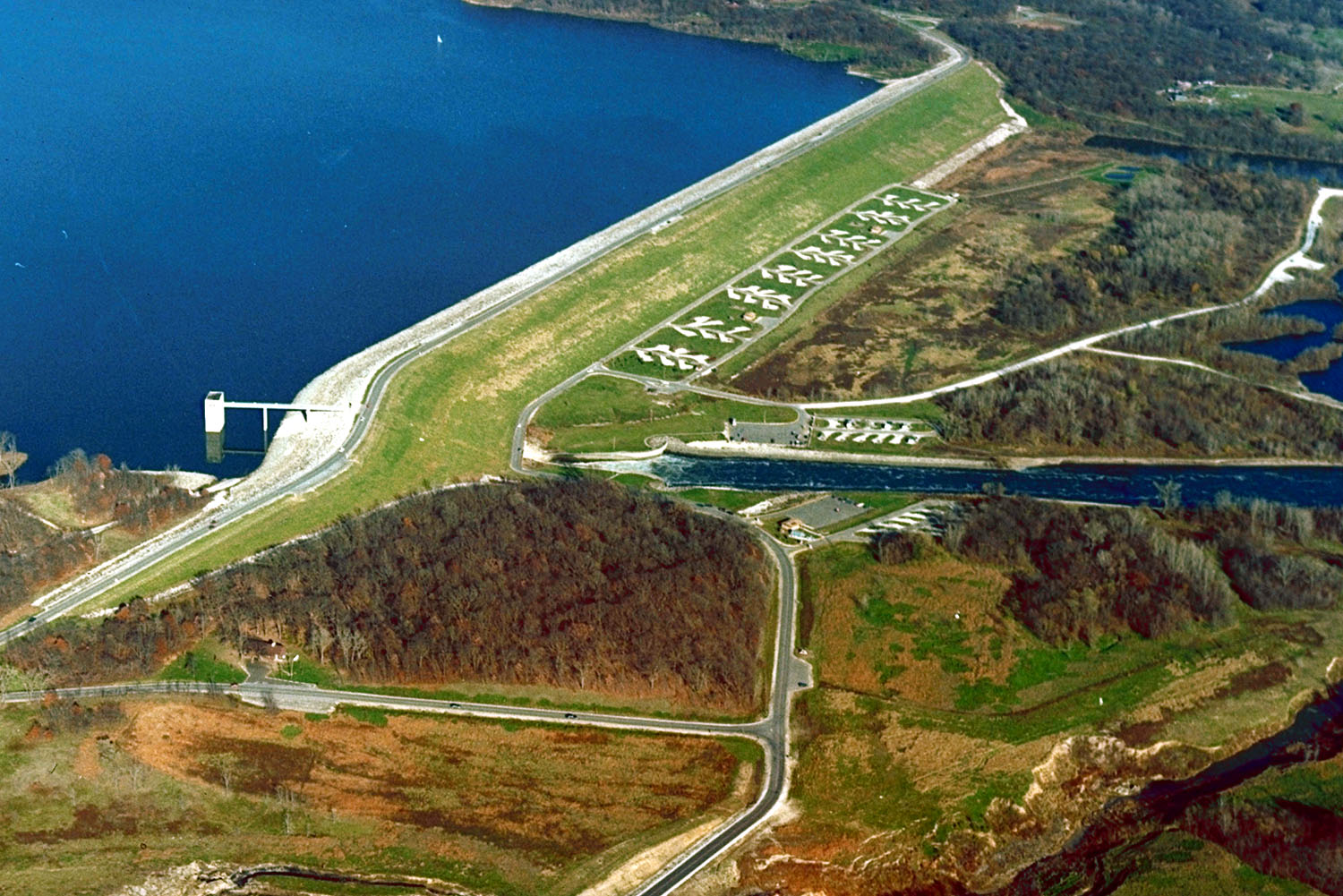
- Interactive map of Saylorville Dam
- Country: United States
- Location: Polk County, Iowa, U.S.
- Coordinates: 41°42′14″N 93°40′53″W
- Purpose: Flood risk management, water storage, recreation, environmental stewardship, low flow augmentation
- Status: Operational
- Opening date: 1977
- Construction cost: $130 Million
- Operator: US Army Corps of Engineers

Dam and spillways
- Type of dam: Earth-filled embankment dam
- Impounds: Des Moines River
- Height: 105 ft (32 m)
- Length: 6,750 ft (2,060 m)
- Elevation at crest: 915.5' NGVD

Reservoir
- Creates: Saylorville Lake
- Active capacity: 567,000 acre⋅ft (0.699 km^{3})
- Inactive capacity: 73,600 acre⋅ft (0.0908 km^{3})
- Catchment area: 5,823 sq mi (15,080 km^{2})
- Surface area: 5,520 acres (22.3 km^{2}) (normal pool)
- Maximum length: 19 mi (31 km) (normal pool)
- Website; US Army Corps of Engineers: Welcome to Saylorville Lake

Saylorville Dam is an embankment dam in Polk County, Iowa built as part of the Saylorville Lake Project by the US Army Corps of Engineers (USACE). Construction began in 1958 and concluded in 1977, with the final construction standing at 6,750 feet (2,057 m) long, 105 feet (32 m) tall, and 44 feet (13 m) wide at the top, built out of 7.5 million cubic yards of compacted material. The dam is not used as a hydroelectric system. The dam, as part of its larger project, exists as part of larger efforts to mitigate and prevent flooding in Iowa, particularly for the capital of the state, Des Moines.

== History ==
The site of Saylorville Dam was selected from among nine sites for the creation of a reservoir to address flooding from the Des Moines River and more broadly to implement flood risk management for the upper Mississippi River Basin. The dam was constructed after the larger dam at Lake Red Rock, in order to provide further flood control capacity. The overall Saylorville Lake Project also replaced a prior plan of flood protection for Polk City, which was initially "to be protected with a system of tall levees," as this became obsolete after the Lake Project.

Excavation for the dam began in July, 1965, lasting until fall, 1967; construction concluded in October, 1975, the final section of which had begun in February, 1973. Though the Project did not become fully operational until 1977, the Des Moines River was diverted into the lake in July 1975.

The first full use of the Project for flood control took place in spring, 1984, during which water reached a height of 889.29 feet (271.06 metres). The highest inflows and outflows were respectively recorded during the Great Flood of 1993 and the Iowa Flood of 2008, with 47,100 cfs recorded on July 11, 1993 and 60,600 cfs on June 10, 2008. The longest spillway releases also took place at these times, in 1993 for 42 consecutive days and in 2008 for 12 consecutive days.

The reservoir also serves as water supply, fulfilling a contract with the State of Iowa, in place since 1982; which has been further allocated to Des Moines Water Works and Iowa Southern Utilities. Further, the Iowa Department of Natural Resources has custodianship of the corresponding ponding area behind the barrier dam as a refuge for waterfowl.

== Project structures ==
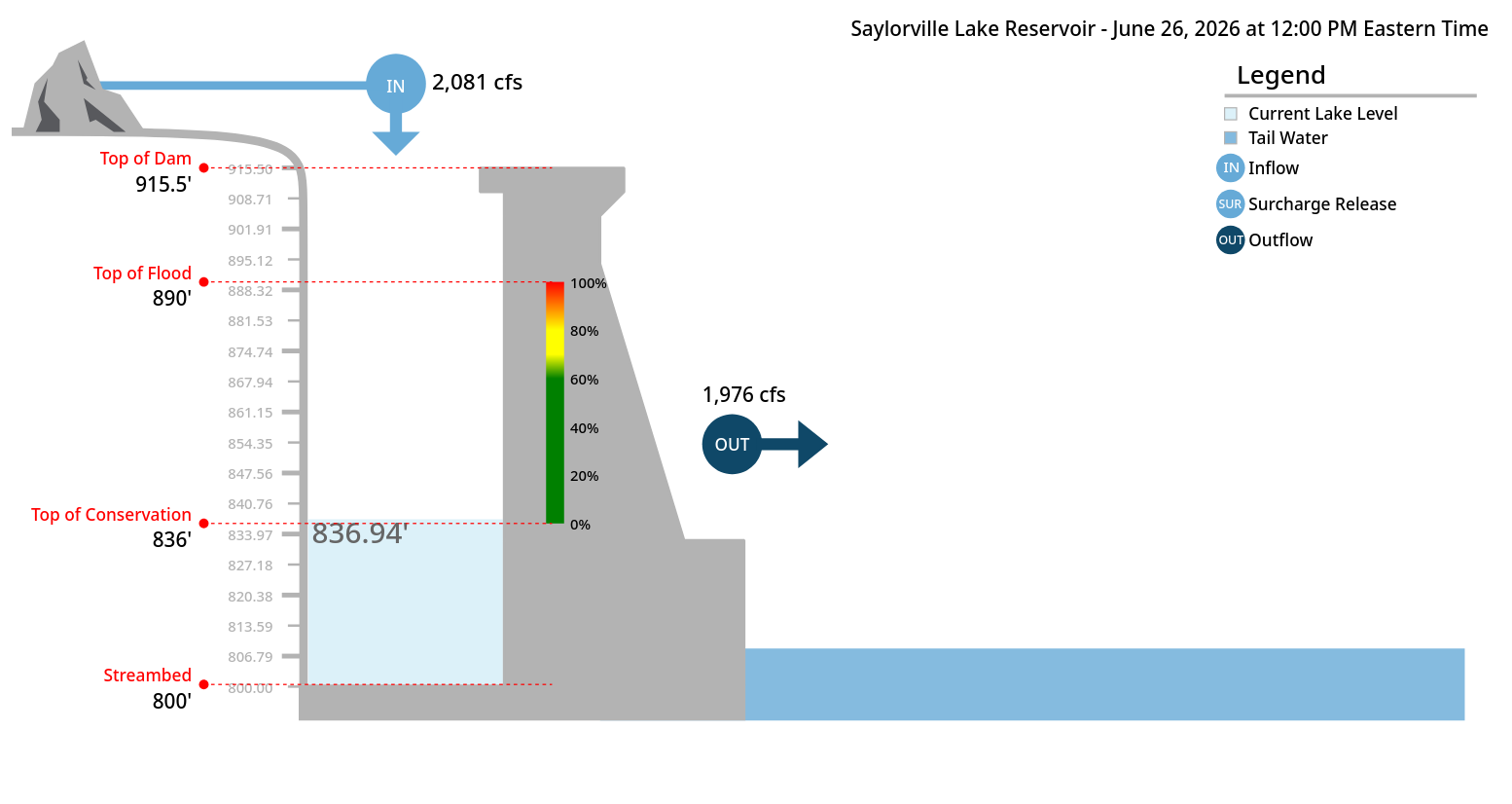
An illustration of mechanisms and utilization of Saylorville Lake Project for water flow (USACE)

The Saylorville Lake Project includes both the Saylorville Dam and the Big Creek Remedial Works. Listed are the major parts of the Project:

- Barrier dam: The embankment is composed of various compacted material; below 825 feet, the material is riprap, while above there is sod with one layer of topsoil;
- Pump station: three 24" pumps with 350 horsepower motors, which pump excess water when water levels in the lake are too high; at full capacity, dam outflows can reach 21,000 cubic feet per second (cfs), though normal rates are between 200 and 6,000 cfs;
- Diversion dam: constructed to form Big Creek Lake and specifically enables protection from flooding within Big Creek Watershed;
- Diversion channel and terminal dam/spillway: "Diverts floodwater from Big Creek Lake into Saylorville Lake." The spillway has a crest elevation of 920 NGVD. Following the Great Flood of 1993, the USACE added pneumatic crest gates to the spillway in 1994.

Among these, the Barrier dam and spillway began operation in 1972, with the others following in 1977. The barrier dam also provides the function of serving as a public-access road, NW 78th Avenue. The Project was originally designed to handle the event of a Probable Maximum Flood, the capacities for which were set at a lake level of 907 ft (276 m) and flows of 162,000 cfs.

== Sedimentation ==
The flood–preventing purpose of the Dam is at risk of being compromised by inflows of sediment to the reservoir. The process of sedimentation has led to c. 50 million cubic feet of sediment flowing into the lake each year; the process also affects the viability of local industry and recreation. The typical solution to the problem is to raise the water level of the reservoir, but this leads to a lower capacity for storing flood water. In 2024, rainfall led to the reservoir filling to "44 feet more than normal lake levels and a few feet below the spillway." Yet, the sedimentation also provides a benefit for drinking water, as the deposition of sediment prevents that sediment from continuing downstream in the Des Moines River.

== See also ==
- Saylorville Lake
- Great Flood of 1993

== Notes ==
Page numbers for USACE report "Saylorville Lake Master Plan" are numbered by Section-Page, e.g. "3-7" would not be referring to pages 3 through 7, but rather one page: section 3, page 7.
