= James Fee =

American photographer

- Born: December 7, 1949; Knoxville, Iowa, U.S.
- Died: September 4, 2006 (aged 56)
- Occupation: Photographer
- Spouse: Elena Stoyanov
- Children: 1
- Father: Russell James Fee

James Fee (December 7, 1949 — September 4, 2006) was an American photographer known for his images of abandoned factories and lonesome highways.

== Life ==
Fee was born in Knoxville, Iowa. After graduating from high school he drove from Iowa to California and settled in San Francisco. While in San Francisco, he married Sharon Kitzman. Fee also lived in New York City and Los Angeles, California.

Much of Fee's earlier personal work was made using a Graflex Norita 66 with a combination of extension tubes, tele-extenders and mid-century telephoto lenses. The camera and gear was stolen in the early 1990s during the creation of his "Photographs of Americana" series. Fee found it difficult to replace the camera and began to experiment using the Russian made Kieve 90 with lens embellishments. Fee appreciated the irony of using the Russian camera to complete the series.

Fee's approach to photography led museum curators to give his exhibitions such titles as "American Noir" and "The Weight of Time". His photographs are permanently housed in the San Diego Museum of Photographic Arts, the William Benton Museum of Art, and the Getty Museum. Fee once collaborated with sculptor George Herms, who shared his attraction to the Beat Generation.

During his later career, Fee taught photography at Art Center College of Design in Pasadena, California from 1994 to 2003. In 1993 he taught at Otis College of Art and Design in Los Angeles. Fee photographed images that he thought represented United States cultural icons in decline, such as crumbling drive-in movie theaters and rusting, abandoned cars.

== Peleliu Project ==
Fee's father Russell James Fee served in the U.S. Navy as a medical corpsman attached to the Marine Corps during World War II. During a harrowing battle on Peleliu Island in 1944, he photographed his fellow sailors and Marines and the aftermath of battles. Russell Fee died in 1972.

In 1998, James Fee traveled to Peleliu Island and photographed remnants of the World War II battles that still remained on the island, such as rusted and overgrown tanks, roads, and the tip of a sunken Japanese fighter plane. He attempted to photograph the same scenes recorded by his father more than 50 years earlier.

In an exhibit he called the "Peleliu Project" Fee artistically combined his own photographs with images his father had taken. The exhibit traveled the US and was exhibited at Craig Krull Gallery Santa Monica in 2001 and then housed in the San Diego Museum of Photographic Arts permanently.

== Personal life ==
James Fee was survived by his wife of 30 years, Elena Stoyanov (NJ), and Fee's son from his first marriage, Illya Eric Isaac Fee (CA).

Fee died in Beverly Hills, California. His death was attributed to hepatitis C and liver cancer. Illya Fee was at his father's bedside at the time of Fee's death.
