= Cordova Tower =

Observation tower in Marion County, Iowa, US

Coordinates: 41.42319°N 93.08826°W

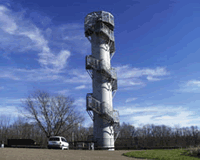
Cordova Tower in Marion County, Iowa

Cordova Tower is an observation tower located in Cordova Park in Marion County, Iowa. The tower is seated on the north side of Lake Red Rock and equidistant from the four Marion County towns of Pella, Knoxville, Monroe, and Otley. With 170 steps and 106 feet tall, it is the tallest observation tower in the Midwestern United States. Ascending from the ground to the observation deck built atop a converted 100 ft by 15 ft standpipe water tower. The tower, completed in 1998, has views of the Des Moines River valley.

== History ==
In 1972, a 130,000-gallon water tower was constructed to provide water to the area. The tower was disused in 1984 when rural water was introduced to the area.

In 1998, the Marion County Conservation Board decided to convert the defunct water tower into an observation tower as part of its development plan for Cordova Park. Construction began in July 1998 and the tower was completed on November 20, 1999. Construction cost $402,492.00.

In 1999, the structure was awarded first place in the Grand Concepter Award from the Engineering Council of Iowa for "engineering excellence".
