= Dixie Cornell Gebhardt =

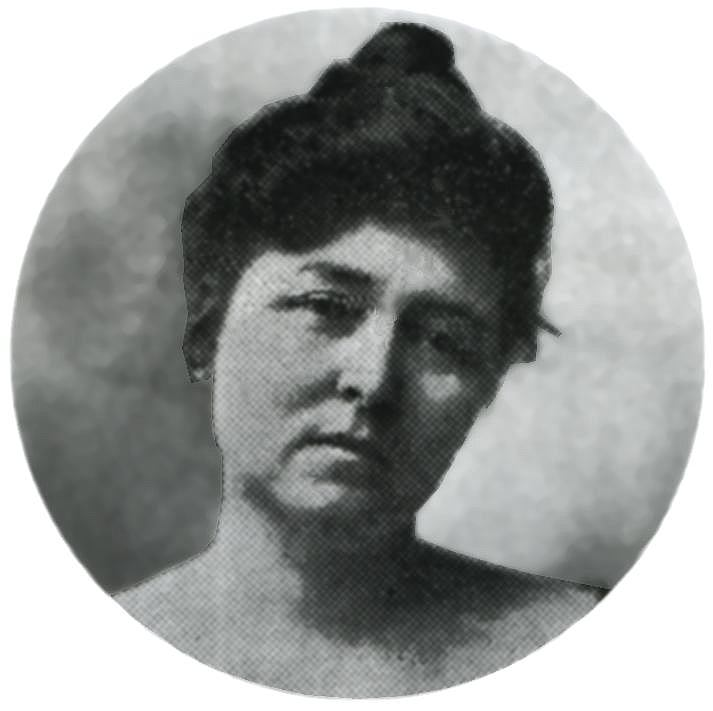
- Cornell Gebhardt in about 1917.
- Born: Dixie Cornell; November 18, 1866; Knoxville, Iowa, U.S.
- Died: October 16, 1955 (aged 88); Knoxville Iowa, U.S.
- Known for: Designer of Iowa State flag
- Spouse: George Tullis Gebhardt

Dixie Cornell Gebhardt (November 18, 1866 – October 16, 1955) was an American state regent and secretary of the Daughters of the American Revolution (DAR) in Iowa during World War I, and designed the flag for the U. S. state of Iowa.

At the beginning of the war, Iowa had no state flag, and such a flag would have been expected to be carried by regiments from that state. (As the war progressed, however, it became obvious that regiments comprising men from individual states would no longer be formed.) Gebhardt's flag design was chosen from among several submissions by Governor William L. Harding and the Iowa Council on National Defense. It became the official flag of the state in 1921.

== Early life and education ==
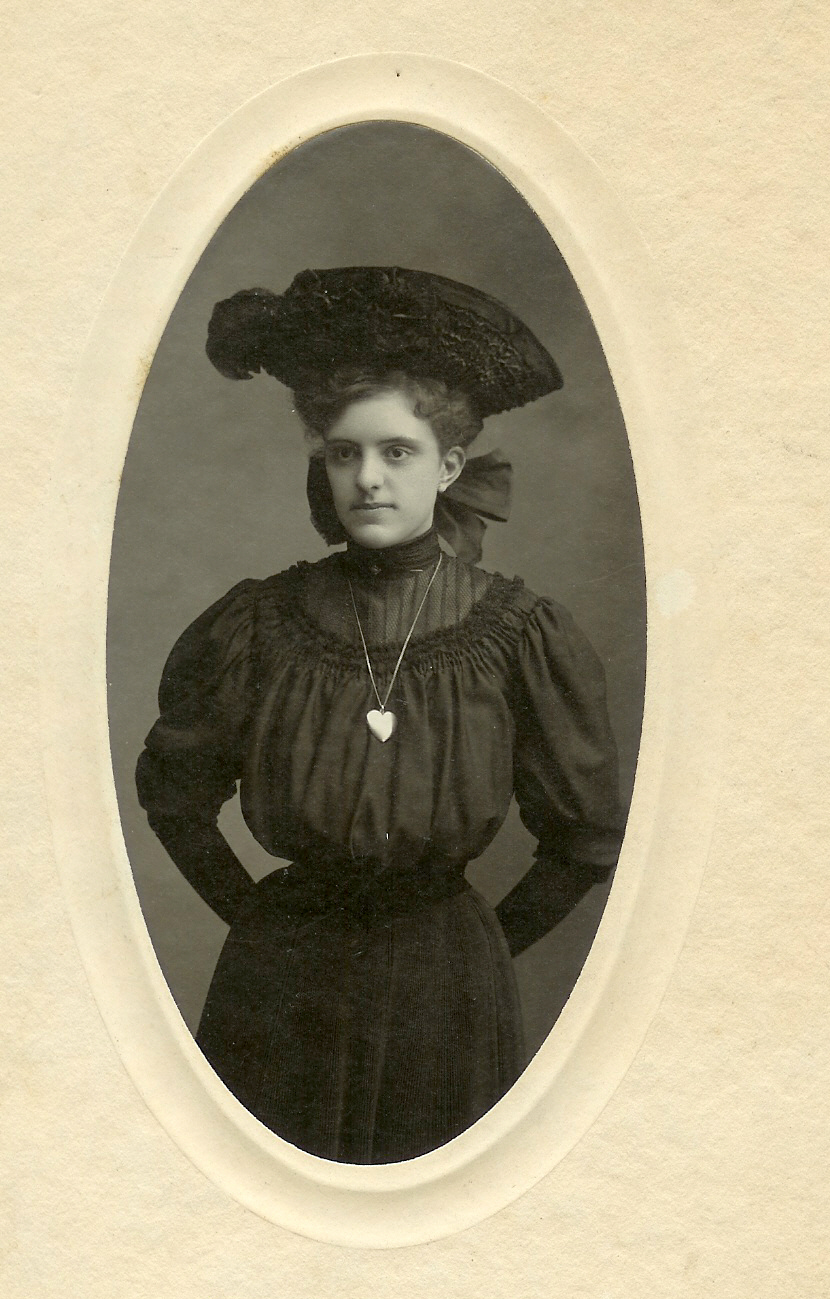
Dixie Cornell Gebhardt, c. 1895

Dixie May Cornell was born on November 18, 1866, in Knoxville, Iowa to Norman Riley Cornell and Mary Fletcher Timmonds. Her father, a pioneer Knoxville physician who served as an army surgeon in the American Civil War with the Iowa Infantry, named his trotting horses, "Iowa Belle," "Jim Dick," and "Jackie" after his three girls. According to her obituary, her mother called her "Dixie" for the south-land and her Green Valley home in Kentucky but friends and relatives also referred to her as "Dickie."

With the exception of a year spent at the Visitation School for Girls in Ottumwa, Iowa in 1883, she lived all her life in Knoxville. She graduated from Knoxville Public Schools in 1885.

== Career ==
She taught briefly after graduating from Knoxville Public Schools in 1885 but returned home to care for her aging parents. On March 20, 1887, she became a member of Knoxville's Chapter M of the P.E.O. Sisterhood, an international women's organization. During her long membership, she served as chapter president and also held offices in the state and supreme chapters.

In June 1900, she married George Tullis Gebhardt.

Originally a member of Abigail Adams Chapter of Daughters of the American Revolution (Des Moines), Gebhardt became the organizer and charter member of Mary Marion Chapter of DAR (Knoxville) in 1917. She served as Iowa DAR recording secretary (1913–1916), state regent (1916–1918), and later as a DAR genealogist at Memorial Continental Hall in Washington, D.C. (dates unknown).

She worked for several years for the Red Cross at the U.S. Veterans Hospital in Knoxville and was also active in the Democratic Party.

=== Flag of the State of Iowa ===
The current state flag of Iowa, designed by Cornell Gebhardt.

The Iowa state flag design was commissioned by Iowa's Governor William Harding and the state Council of Defense in May 1917. It was originally used as a regimental flag for Iowa guardsmen serving along the Mexican border during World War I. It was adopted as Iowa's official state flag in March 1921. The same year, Gebhardt received a copyright of her design, which she then presented as a gift to her native state. She was called, by Governor Harding, "Iowa's Betsy Ross."

According to DAR presenters Iva E. Roorda and Lyle Bruere, Gebhardt designed the flag while she was state regent of the DAR.

She collected ideas from many Iowa DAR and spent eight years in determining the final design. [She] felt that "Flags are symbols of achievements of the human race." Therefore, "Iowa's banner should embrace the history of its domain from the time of its occupation by the Indians; discovery by the French and its purchase from Napoleon I of France by Jefferson; up to its admission into the union down to the present time. All this should be represented in a design so simple that school children and adults could recognize its symbolism and know that it meant Iowa... Dixie Gebhardt felt the designing of our state flag was the greatest achievement of her life."

Gephardt incorporated both symbolic and historical elements into her design. Prior to the Louisiana Purchase of 1803, Iowa was French territory, therefore the first flag to fly over Iowa was the French blue, white, and red. For Gephardt, white represented not only the virtue of purity, but also the unwritten page of Iowa's early history when Native Americans lived on the unbroken prairies of Iowa. Gephardt chose red for courage, but also believed the color to be a favorite of the state's Native American tribes, thus she chose it to represent the word "Iowa," which means "beautiful lands" in the native language. Blue represents the virtue of loyalty. Roorda and Bruere expand further on Gephardt's inspiration and meaning:

In the center a soaring eagle carries blue streamers in his beak which read, "Our liberties we prize and our rights we will maintain." Dixie Gebhardt cleverly signifies here that we are a part of this nation by combining our national bird with Iowa's state motto. The standard of the flag may be surmounted by a gold ear of corn and tied with a gold cord and tassels. A gold fringe may be used around the entire banner. The corn and the gold are symbolic of Iowa's agriculture and wealth...wealth of nature and humanity as well as material wealth from agriculture and industry. The finished design reflects Iowa's history of the past, brings us to the present and certainly points to our future.

In commemoration of Iowa's one hundred years of statehood, the flag was featured on a postage stamp. During Dwight D. Eisenhower's presidency, a flag was sent to the White House, where it held personal significance to the first lady, Mamie Eisenhower, whose birthplace was Iowa.

== Death and legacy ==
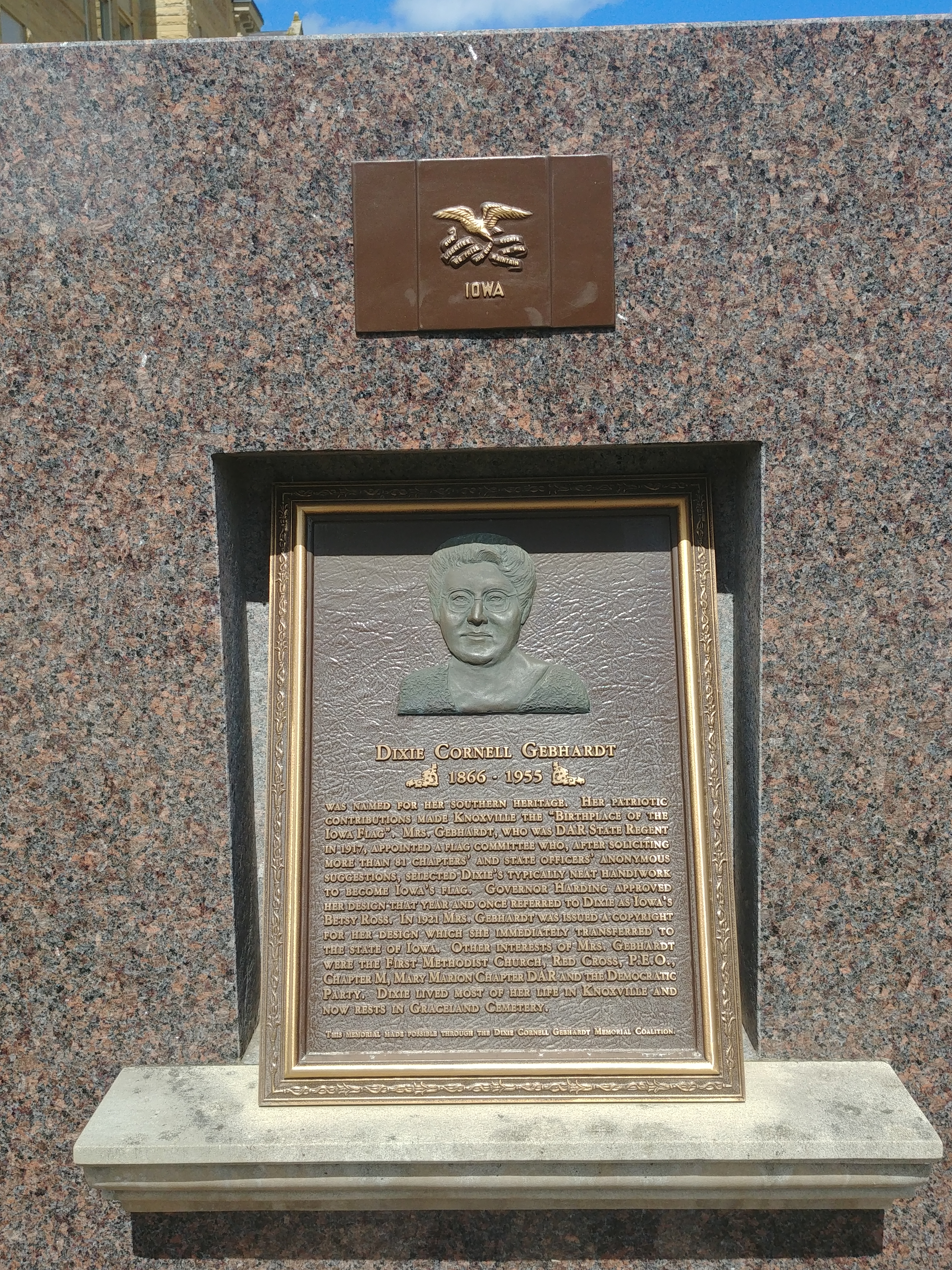
The Dixie Cornell Gebhardt memorial on the Marion County Courthouse square in Knoxville.

Cornell died at 88 at the Collins Memorial Hospital in Knoxville, Iowa on October 16, 1955.

In 1956, the Iowa chapters of the DAR presented a portrait of Gebhardt to be hung in the governor's mansion.

A monument at 217 South Second Street honors her contribution to the state.

In 2015, Iowa Governor Terry Branstad proclaimed March 23–29 as Dixie Cornell Gebhardt Week statewide in anticipation of Iowa Flag Day on March 29. That year, the Library of Knoxville partnered with the area Chamber of Commerce to sponsor a community celebration in Gebhardt's honor. The celebration was held at the Dixie Cornell Gebhardt House and included a flag raising, historical games, a history walk, and open houses for the Marion County Genealogical Society and the Daughters of the American Revolution.
