= Knoxville, Iowa =

- City
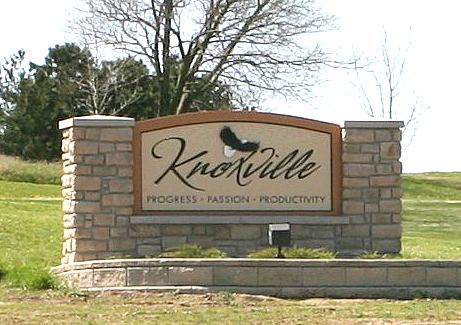
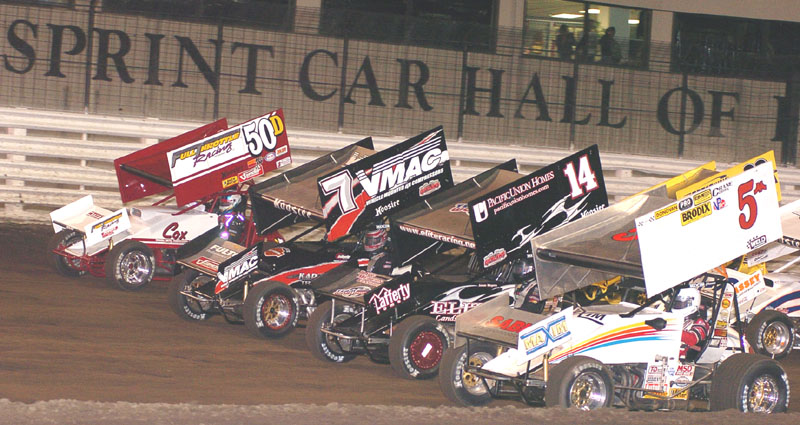
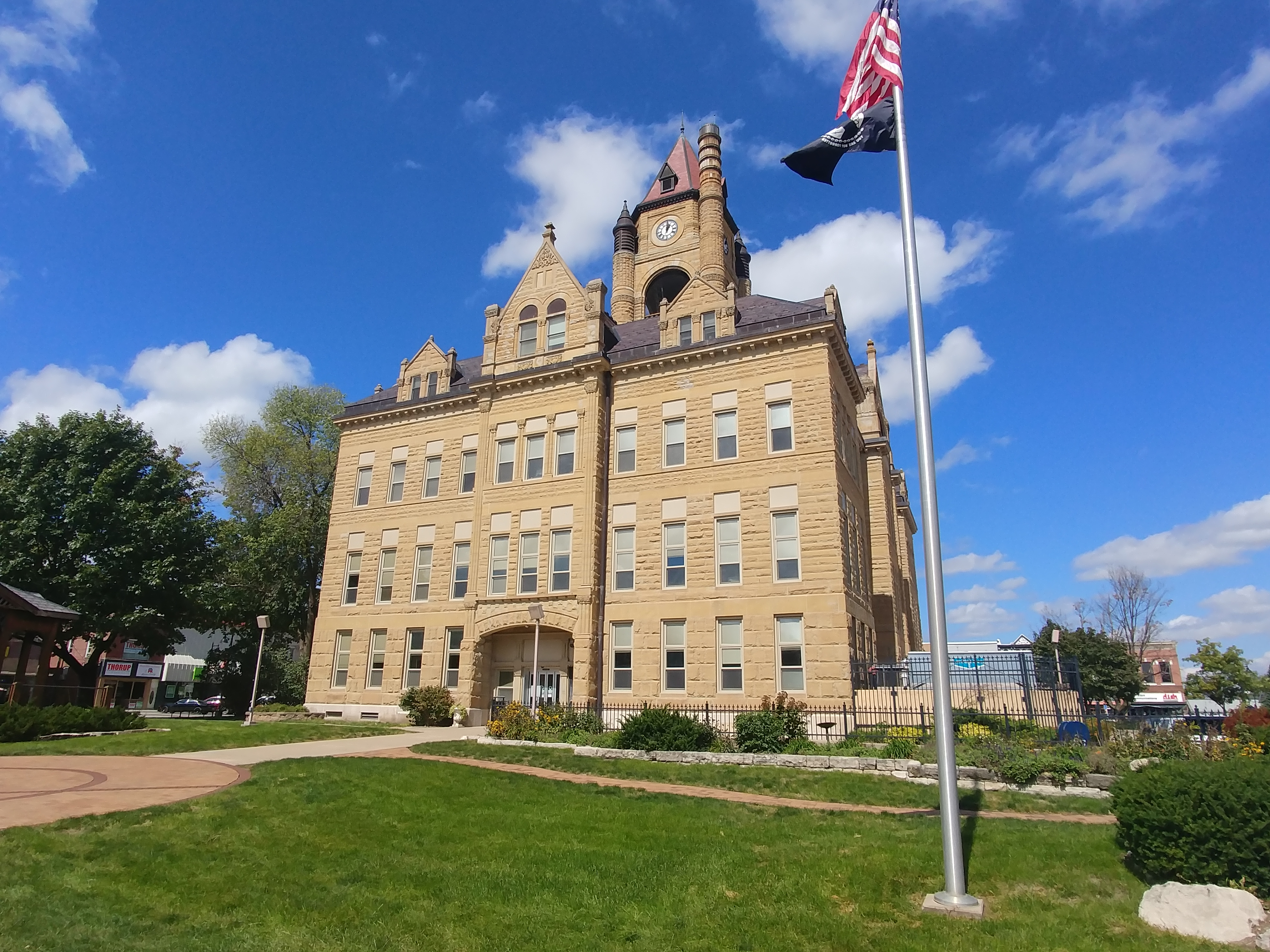
- Knoxville Welcome Sign Knoxville Raceway Marion County Courthouse

- Location of Knoxville, Iowa
- Coordinates: 41°19′18″N 93°06′50″W
- Country: USA
- State: Iowa
- County: Marion

Area
  - Total: 4.62 sq mi (11.97 km^{2})
  - Land: 4.62 sq mi (11.96 km^{2})
  - Water: 0.0039 sq mi (0.01 km^{2})
- Elevation: 909 ft (277 m)

Population (2020)
  - Total: 7,595
  - Density: 1,644.7/sq mi (635.03/km^{2})
- Time zone: UTC-6 (Central (CST))
  - Summer (DST): UTC-5 (CDT)
- ZIP codes: 50138, 50197, 50198
- Area code: 641
- FIPS code: 19-42015
- GNIS feature ID: 2395559
- Website: www.knoxvilleia.gov

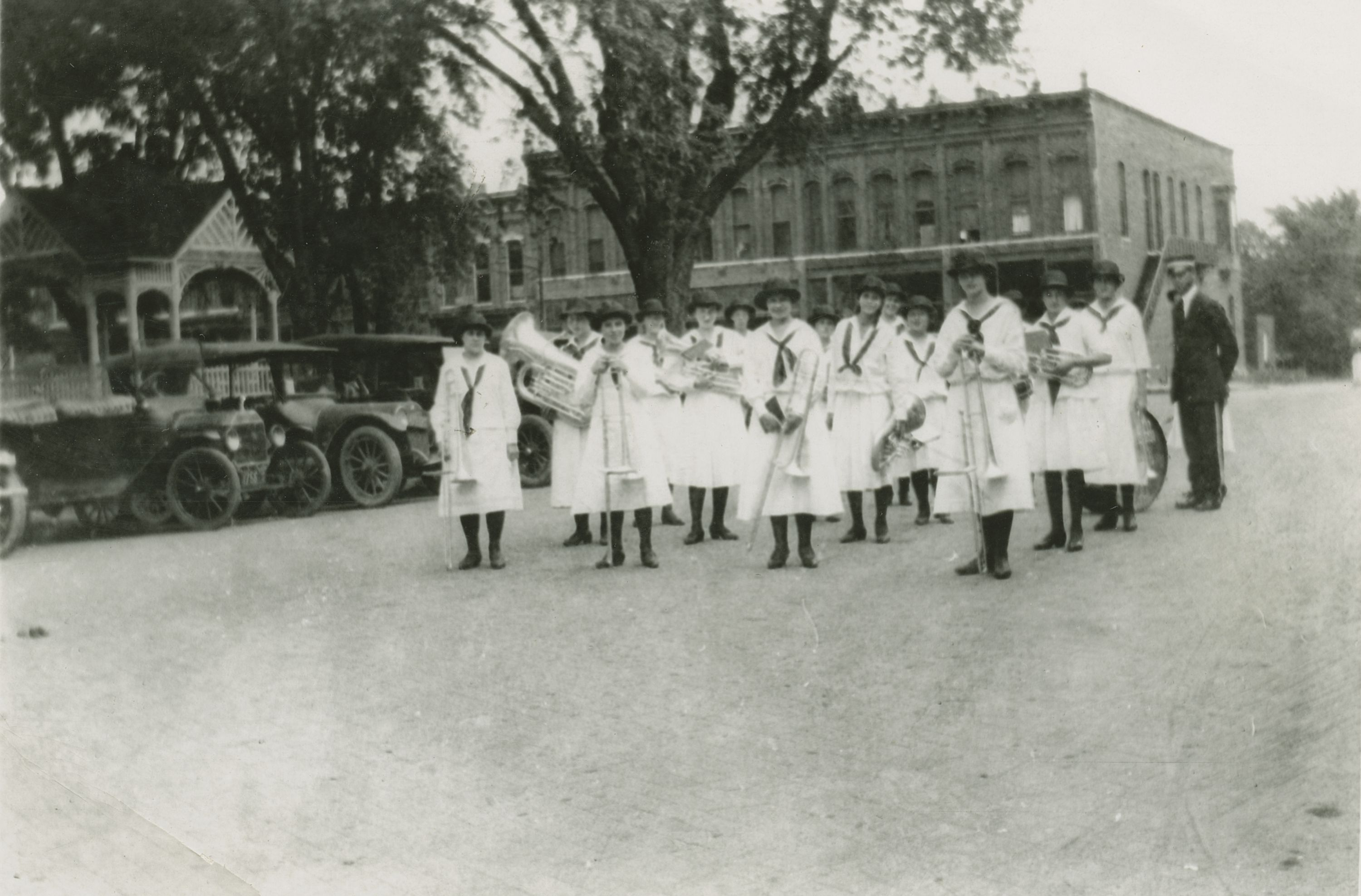
Main Street, Knoxville, Iowa, 1945

Knoxville is a city in and the county seat of Marion County, Iowa, United States. The population was 7,595 at the time of the 2020 census, an increase from 7,313 in the 2010 census. Knoxville is home of the National Sprint Car Hall of Fame & Museum, located next to the Knoxville Raceway dirt track. Knoxville is located 4 miles south of Lake Red Rock and Elk Rock State Park.

== History ==
The site for the future county seat of Marion County was selected because it was within a mile of the county's geographic center, reasonably level, and near a good source of timber.

Knoxville is in south-central Iowa, 35 miles southeast of Des Moines. The area was originally inhabited by Native Americans of the Sac and Meskwaki tribes. At that time, prairie grass covered the countryside at heights of 8 to 10 feet. In 1835, Dragoons first explored the Des Moines River valley through this area. In 1842, the Sac and Fox Indians signed a treaty to sell lands in central Iowa to the new settlers known as the New Purchase of 1842. By 1843, settlers began moving here. The first Marion County Courthouse was erected three years later.

Knoxville was founded in 1845 when Joseph Robinson and James Montgomery, Commissioners from Scott and Wapello County, selected the site for Knoxville and designated it as the county seat. They named Knoxville in honor of General Henry Knox, hero of the Revolutionary War. The city's main streets are named after Robinson and Montgomery.

County surveyor Isaac B. Powers platted part of the town in September 1845, shortly after it was founded. Clairborne Hall laid out the remainder of the town in the winter of 1846–47. Additional surveys were made in December 1849 and September 1852.

The first sale of lots on October 21, 1845, saw the best sites in town go for $15 to $65. The first survey made the streets 80 feet wide, alleys 10 feet wide, and lots 120' × 60', but the third survey changed the width of the streets to 50 feet, and made the blocks 265' × 240'.

The first Marion County courthouse was built on a lot owned by L.C. Corny. Contractor Lewis M. Pearch started work on May 29, 1846, at a cost of approximately $80,000.

Knoxville remained an unincorporated village until 1853, when a movement for incorporation began. A judicial order was issued after an election in which 64 votes were cast in favor of incorporation, with 4 votes against. Knoxville was duly incorporated as a City in 1855.

In early 1853, the citizens of Marion County created a committee to attract railroad development to the county and to Knoxville, promising to buy shares in any railroad that reached town. The first contender was the Muscatine, Oskaloosa & Council Bluffs, proposing an east–west line that would pass through Knoxville, the line being suggested in January 1868 by the proposed Muscatine, Oskaloosa & Council Bluffs. By 1875, when this line reached Knoxville, it was the Chicago, Burlington & Quincy Railroad. The second railroad to reach Knoxville was the Chicago, Rock Island & Pacific, which completed a line from Oskaloosa in 1876.

Systematic coal mining in Marion County began with the Union Coal Company's mine in Flagler, 4 miles (6.4 km) east of Knoxville, around 1874 or 1875. For several years, the Number 5 mine in Flagler was one of Iowa's most productive, employing around 150 men and working a coal vein over 8 feet (2.5 m) thick. The Oak Hill coal company also had mines in Flagler.

Shortly after the railroad reached Knoxville, J. T. James opened a coal mine in town eight blocks north of the courthouse. This mine continued in operation until 1890. A second mine nearby was operated by W. A. Gamble. In the 1880s, the White Breast Fuel Company opened the Number 11 mine at Flagler. This mine operated in a coal vein that was locally up to 14 feet thick, but only locally. The mine continued operating until 1892, working in progressively thinner coal as it expanded.

== Demographics ==
Historical population
Census	Pop.	Note	%±
1860	1,124		—
1870	800		−28.8%
1880	2,577		222.1%
1890	2,632		2.1%
1900	3,131		19.0%
1910	3,190		1.9%
1920	3,523		10.4%
1930	4,697		33.3%
1940	6,936		47.7%
1950	7,625		9.9%
1960	7,817		2.5%
1970	7,755		−0.8%
1980	8,143		5.0%
1990	8,232		1.1%
2000	7,731		−6.1%
2010	7,313		−5.4%
2020	7,595		3.9%
Iowa Data Center

=== 2020 census ===
As of the 2020 census, Knoxville had a population of 7,595, with 3,239 households and 1,886 families. The population density was 1,644.7 inhabitants per square mile (635.0/km^{2}).

The median age was 41.3 years. 23.0% of residents were under the age of 18 and 21.1% were 65 years of age or older. 25.0% of residents were under the age of 20; 5.2% were between the ages of 20 and 24; 24.0% were from 25 to 44; and 24.6% were from 45 to 64. The gender makeup of the city was 48.3% male and 51.7% female. For every 100 females there were 93.6 males, and for every 100 females age 18 and over there were 89.8 males age 18 and over.

99.2% of residents lived in urban areas, while 0.8% lived in rural areas.

Of the city's 3,239 households, 27.1% had children under the age of 18 living with them. 39.6% were married-couple households, 9.1% were cohabiting-couple households, 20.6% were households with a male householder and no spouse or partner present, and 30.7% were households with a female householder and no spouse or partner present. 41.8% of households were non-families. About 35.6% of all households were made up of individuals, and 15.9% had someone living alone who was 65 years of age or older.

There were 3,494 housing units at an average density of 756.6 per square mile (292.1/km^{2}). Of all housing units, 7.3% were vacant. The homeowner vacancy rate was 1.6% and the rental vacancy rate was 5.4%.

Racial composition as of the 2020 census
Race	Number	Percent
White	7,011	92.3%
Black or African American	112	1.5%
American Indian and Alaska Native	35	0.5%
Asian	36	0.5%
Native Hawaiian and Other Pacific Islander	1	0.0%
Some other race	56	0.7%
Two or more races	344	4.5%
Hispanic or Latino (of any race)	180	2.4%

=== 2010 census ===
As of the census of 2010, there were 7,313 people, 3,169 households, and 1,925 families living in the city. The population density was 1,579.5 inhabitants per square mile (609.8/km^{2}). There were 3,527 housing units at an average density of 761.8 per square mile (294.1/km^{2}). The racial makeup of the city was 96.9% White, 1.1% African American, 0.3% Native American, 0.5% Asian, 0.2% from other races, and 1.0% from two or more races. Hispanic or Latino of any race were 1.9% of the population.

There were 3,169 households, of which 30.5% had children under the age of 18 living with them, 43.9% were married couples living together, 12.3% had a female householder with no husband present, 4.5% had a male householder with no wife present, and 39.3% were non-families. 34.9% of all households were made up of individuals, and 15.7% had someone living alone who was 65 years of age or older. The average household size was 2.25 and the average family size was 2.90.

The median age in the city was 41 years. 24.7% of residents were under the age of 18; 7.2% were between the ages of 18 and 24; 22.5% were from 25 to 44; 26.4% were from 45 to 64; and 19.1% were 65 years of age or older. The gender makeup of the city was 48.3% male and 51.7% female.

=== 2000 census ===
According to the census of 2000, there were 7,731 people, 3,191 households, and 1,984 families living in the city. The population density was 1,746.2 inhabitants per square mile (674.2/km^{2}). There were 3,418 housing units at an average density of 772.0 per square mile (298.1/km^{2}). The racial makeup of the city was 97.00% White, 0.88% African American, 0.31% Native American, 0.52% Asian, 0.06% Pacific Islander, 0.28% from other races, and 0.94% from two or more races. 0.83% of the population were Hispanics or Latinos of any race.

There were 3,191 households, out of which 30.0% had children under the age of 18 living with them, 48.7% were married couples living together, 10.2% had a female householder with no husband present, and 37.8% were non-families. 33.4% of all households were made up of individuals, and 15.1% had someone living alone who was 65 years of age or older. The average household size was 2.28 and the average family size was 2.92.

Age spread: 23.9% under the age of 18, 7.8% from 18 to 24, 26.5% from 25 to 44, 22.2% from 45 to 64, and 19.6% who were 65 years of age or older. The median age was 40 years. For every 100 females, there were 98.6 males. For every 100 females age 18 and over, there were 95.6 males.

The median income for a household in the city was $34,055, and the median income for a family was $44,078. Males had a median income of $34,832 versus $21,593 for females. The per capita income for the city was $17,893. About 9.6% of families and 11.1% of the population were below the poverty line, including 16.1% of those under age 18 and 8.9% of those age 65 or over.

== Geography ==
Knoxville is 2 miles (3.2 km) east of White Breast Creek and 6 miles southwest of the confluence of White Breast Creek and the Des Moines River in Lake Red Rock.

According to the United States Census Bureau, the city has an area of 4.63 square miles (11.99 km^{2}), all land.

=== Climate ===
According to the Köppen Climate Classification system, Knoxville has a hot-summer humid continental climate, abbreviated "Dfa" on climate maps.

Climate data for Knoxville, Iowa, 1991–2020 normals, extremes 1893–present
Month	Jan	Feb	Mar	Apr	May	Jun	Jul	Aug	Sep	Oct	Nov	Dec	Year
Record high °F (°C)	70 (21)	78 (26)	89 (32)	92 (33)	106 (41)	105 (41)	113 (45)	114 (46)	104 (40)	97 (36)	83 (28)	74 (23)	114 (46)
Mean maximum °F (°C)	54.1 (12.3)	59.0 (15.0)	73.2 (22.9)	81.5 (27.5)	87.5 (30.8)	92.3 (33.5)	95.9 (35.5)	94.9 (34.9)	90.6 (32.6)	82.7 (28.2)	69.8 (21.0)	58.1 (14.5)	97.4 (36.3)
Mean daily maximum °F (°C)	29.9 (−1.2)	35.1 (1.7)	47.6 (8.7)	60.6 (15.9)	70.9 (21.6)	80.6 (27.0)	84.6 (29.2)	82.7 (28.2)	76.2 (24.6)	63.0 (17.2)	48.1 (8.9)	35.5 (1.9)	59.6 (15.3)
Daily mean °F (°C)	21.2 (−6.0)	26.0 (−3.3)	37.6 (3.1)	49.9 (9.9)	61.1 (16.2)	70.9 (21.6)	75.1 (23.9)	72.9 (22.7)	65.3 (18.5)	52.6 (11.4)	39.0 (3.9)	27.2 (−2.7)	49.9 (9.9)
Mean daily minimum °F (°C)	12.5 (−10.8)	17.0 (−8.3)	27.6 (−2.4)	39.2 (4.0)	51.2 (10.7)	61.3 (16.3)	65.6 (18.7)	63.1 (17.3)	54.3 (12.4)	42.2 (5.7)	29.9 (−1.2)	18.9 (−7.3)	40.2 (4.6)
Mean minimum °F (°C)	−8.2 (−22.3)	−3.1 (−19.5)	9.3 (−12.6)	24.8 (−4.0)	37.8 (3.2)	50.4 (10.2)	56.2 (13.4)	53.8 (12.1)	39.9 (4.4)	27.3 (−2.6)	13.2 (−10.4)	−1.2 (−18.4)	−12.1 (−24.5)
Record low °F (°C)	−30 (−34)	−29 (−34)	−19 (−28)	9 (−13)	25 (−4)	35 (2)	45 (7)	40 (4)	25 (−4)	2 (−17)	−5 (−21)	−26 (−32)	−30 (−34)
Average precipitation inches (mm)	1.15 (29)	1.67 (42)	1.87 (47)	3.85 (98)	4.98 (126)	5.61 (142)	4.34 (110)	3.89 (99)	3.66 (93)	3.06 (78)	1.80 (46)	1.57 (40)	37.45 (950)
Average snowfall inches (cm)	6.1 (15)	6.6 (17)	3.9 (9.9)	0.5 (1.3)	trace	0.0 (0.0)	0.0 (0.0)	0.0 (0.0)	0.0 (0.0)	0.0 (0.0)	1.7 (4.3)	8.3 (21)	27.1 (68.5)
Average precipitation days (≥ 0.01 in)	4.9	5.4	7.9	10.1	12.3	11.0	7.8	8.7	7.8	7.9	6.3	5.0	95.1
Average snowy days (≥ 0.1 in)	3.6	2.4	1.3	0.2	0.0	0.0	0.0	0.0	0.0	0.0	0.6	3.3	11.4
Source 1: NOAA (snow/snow days 1981–2010)
Source 2: National Weather Service

== Education ==
The Knoxville Community School District operates local public schools.

== Notable people ==
- Robert L. Burns, member of the Los Angeles City Council (1929–1945)
- George Kruck Cherrie, naturalist and explorer, born in Knoxville
- James Fee, photographer
- Dixie Cornell Gebhardt, designer of the Flag of Iowa
- Joseph P. Graw, Minnesota state representative and businessman
- Edward R. Hays, U.S. representative (1890–1891)
- James Mathews, U.S. representative, professor at Iowa State College.
- Howard B. Myers, economist
- Frank Steunenberg, governor of Idaho (1897–1901); assassinated in 1905
- Edward C. Stone, director of NASA Jet Propulsion Laboratory (1991–2001)
- William M. Stone, governor of Iowa (1864–1868)
- William Corwin Stuart, attorney and jurist
- Jon Thorup, member of the Iowa House of Representatives
- Henry Carroll Timmonds, Missouri state representative and judge in late 1800s
