= Iowa State Council for Defense =

The Iowa State Council for Defense was created by Iowa Governor William L. Harding one month after the United States entered World War I, and was disbanded soon after the end of the war. It became a focal point of various political battles conducted in the name of loyalty and Americanism.

Its original mission was to "assist in working out the plan for conscription in Iowa and on other war measures as required from time to time by the government." Unlike its counterpart in Minnesota (the Minnesota Commission of Public Safety), the Council was officially an advisory body with no formally delegated powers. Governor Harding refused the Council's request that he convene a special session of the Iowa General Assembly to grant the Council legal standing and money to spend.

Its history was short, but stormy. The Des Moines Daily News reported that "[t]he meetings of the council were irregular, infrequent and always star chamber proceedings. . . . From the beginning, dissension featured the meetings, and long before the close of the war one-half of the membership ceased to attend the sessions." One of the Council's members, Iowa Homestead editor James M. Pierce, accused his colleagues on the Council of conducting a "reign of terror" to drive the Nonpartisan League from Iowa.

To chair the Council, Governor Harding chose Lafayette Young, the editor and publisher of The Des Moines Capital. Young had been appointed as an interim U.S. Senator in November 1910 immediately upon the death of Senator Jonathan Dolliver, but was defeated by William Squire Kenyon in the special legislative election in the Iowa General Assembly the following April.

As the Council's chairman, Young urged that "disloyal" persons should be impoverished and imprisoned, arguing that "[a]ny man who has lived under the protection of our laws and has accumulated wealth and is now disloyal should be deprived of every dollar he possesses and he should be interned in a stockade until the end of the war and at that time his fate should be considered carefully." He also campaigned against the teaching of any foreign language in any public school or college, and for the imposition of English literacy tests for voting.

In May 1917, the Council approved the official state flag of Iowa, designed by Dixie Cornell Gebhardt, so that Iowa regiments could have a flag of their own in addition to the American flag.

The Council disbanded in January 1919, two months after the end of the war.
