= Elk Rock State Park =

State park in Marion County, Iowa

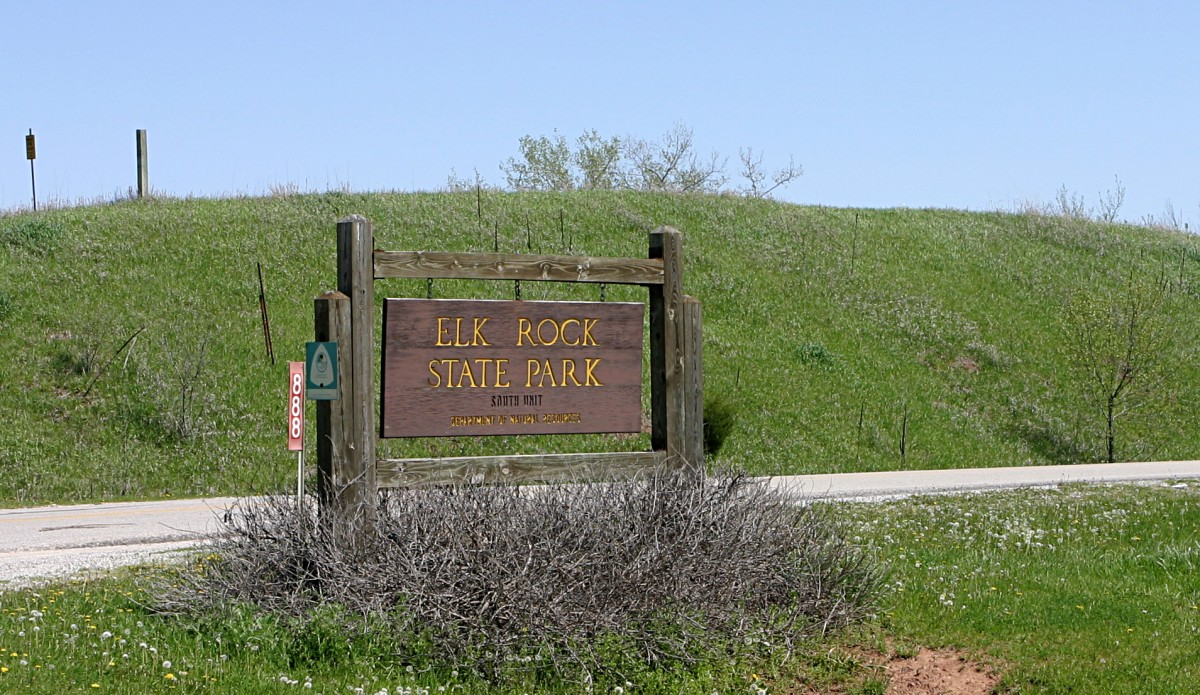
- Sign for the south/main area of Elk Rock State Park

- Location within Iowa Location within the United States
- Location: Marion County, Iowa, United States
- Coordinates: 41°24′3″N 93°5′13″W
- Area: 80 acres (32 ha)
- Elevation: 823 ft (251 m)
- Established: 1978
- Administrator: Iowa Department of Natural Resources
- Website: Official website

Elk Rock State Park is a public recreation area in Marion County, Iowa, United States, situated on both upstream banks of Red Rock Reservoir. Knoxville at the southwest and Pella to the northeast are the nearest cities. The state park comprises its main area and the smaller "Mile Long Bridge" area. The main area has campsites, boat ramps, and trails.

== History ==
Native American inhabitation dates back five thousand years. The Sac and Fox tribes granted white settlers rights to the grounds in 1842. The outlines of the extinct town of Red Rock lie at the bottom of the lake. The United States Army Corps of Engineers began construction of a dam in 1960 and completed it in 1969. In 1969, the Iowa Conservation Commission leased land from the Corps of Engineers to establish North Elk Rock (now Cordova Park). In 1978, a lease was obtained for South Elk Rock which is now what is considered Elk Rock State Park.

== Land usage ==
The Red Rock Reservoir provides for good fishing as well as general boating and swimming activities. Elk Rock has an equestrian camping area with a 100 ft × 200 ft (30 m × 61 m) arena and other facilities.

Red Rock also serves as a stopping point for migratory birds and other waterfowl. Two hundred species of birds, 54 species of trees, 62 species of wildflowers, 43 species of fish, and 35 species of mammals have been seen here.
