= Lake Red Rock (Des Moines River) =

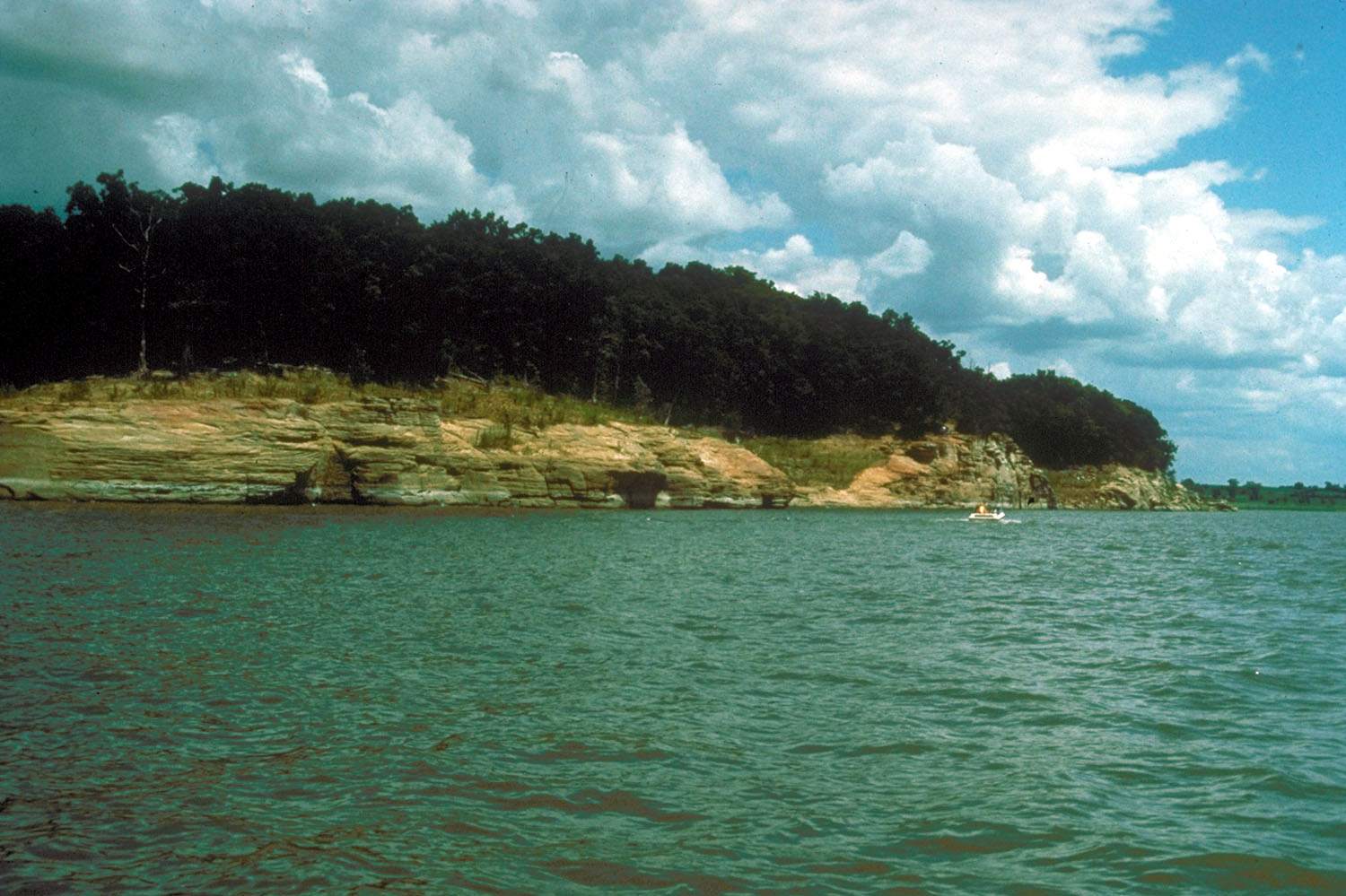
- (Army Corps of Engineers)

- Location within Iowa Location within the United States
- Location: Marion County, Iowa, United States
- Coordinates: 41°24′19″N 93°02′49″W
- Type: reservoir
- Primary inflows: Des Moines River
- Primary outflows: Des Moines River
- Catchment area: 12,000 sq mi (31,080 km^{2})
- Basin countries: United States
- Max. length: 11 mi (18 km)
- Surface area: 15,520 acres (62.81 km^{2}) max: 70,000 acres (283.28 km^{2})
- Surface elevation: 742 ft (226 m)

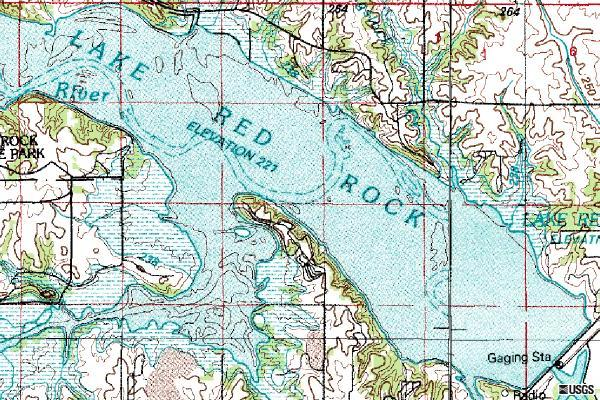
USGS topographical map of Lake Red Rock, showing Red Rock Dam, and left-center, the mouth of White Breast Creek

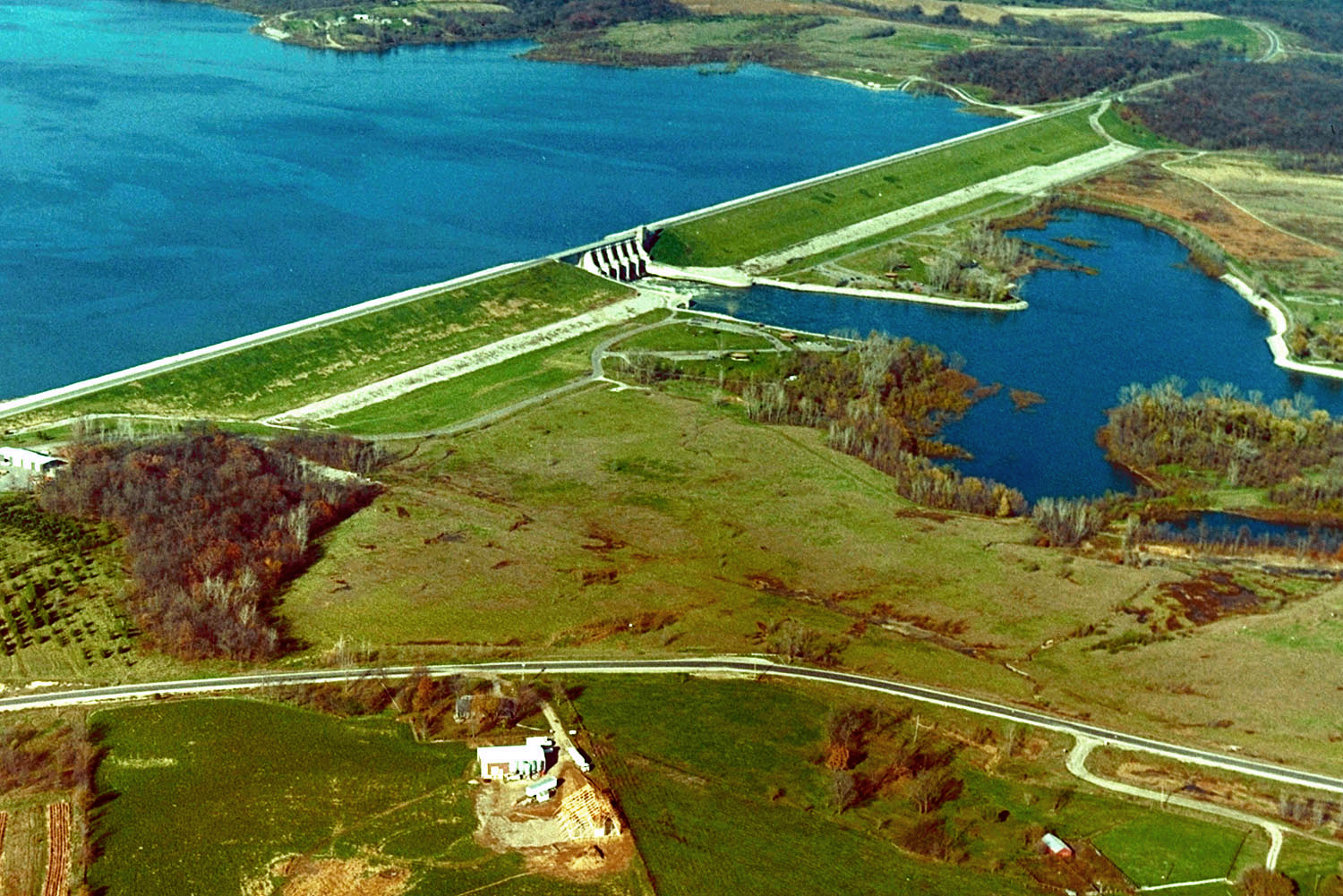
Red Rock Dam and Lake Red Rock (Army Corps of Engineers)

Lake Red Rock, also referred to as Red Rock Reservoir is a reservoir formed by Red Rock Dam on the Des Moines River, about 41 miles (66 km) southeast of the city of Des Moines, Iowa, U.S. The dam was completed in 1969 as a Flood control project by the United States Army Corps of Engineers, creating the largest lake in Iowa. Lake Red Rock was named after one of the lost towns under the reservoir, Red Rock. The lake is essentially confined to Marion County. The damface is a few miles west and south of Pella, and similarly, a few miles northeast of Knoxville.

== Recreation and points of interest ==
The lake shore has various recreational activities such as camping, hiking, boating and fishing. The state maintains Elk Rock State Park on both sides of the lake while Roberts Creek Park and Cordova Park (location of Cordova Tower) are managed by the Marion County Conservation Board.

The Army Corps of Engineers maintains several campgrounds as well: White Breast Recreation Area, Ivans Recreation Area, Wallashuck Recreation Area, Howell Station Recreation Area, and the North Overlook Recreation Area. There is also a "water trail", known as the Red Rock Water Trail, where one can float down the Des Moines River from the southeast corner of Polk County to the lake and down to Red Rock Dam. Flotilla 4 of the Coast Guard Auxiliary provides boating safety education and free vessel safety checks to boaters in the area.

A major landmark is what is locally called the "Mile Long Bridge", carrying Iowa Highway 14 at its upstream end.
