= Council of state =

A council of state is a governmental body in a country, or a subdivision of a country, with a function that varies by jurisdiction. It may be the formal name for the cabinet or it may refer to a non-executive advisory body associated with a head of state. In some countries it functions as a supreme administrative court and is sometimes regarded as the equivalent of a privy council.

== Modern ==
- (Belgium) Belgian Council of State is a judicial and advisory body that assists the executive with obligatory legal advice on each draft law and is the supreme court for administrative justice
- (China) Chinese State Council is the country's highest executive body
- (Colombia) Colombian Council of State
- (Cuba) Cuban Council of State
- (Denmark) Danish Council of State is similar to a privy council with a largely ceremonial role
- (Netherlands) Dutch Council of State is an advisory body that consists of one or two members of the royal family and other members appointed by the Crown
- (Egypt) Egyptian Council of State
- (Finland) Finnish Government is literally referred to as council of state in Finnish (valtioneuvosto) and Swedish (statsrådet)
- (France) French Council of State is a judicial and advisory body. It assists the executive with legal advice and is the supreme court for administrative justice
- Ghanaian Council of State advises the President of Ghana in the exercise of most of his/her reserve powers
- Greek Council of State is the supreme administrative court of Greece and also examines all presidential decrees before they are issued
- (India) Rajya Sabha Indian Council of State
- (Republic of Ireland) Irish Council of State advises the President of Ireland in the exercise of most of his/her reserve powers
- (Italy) Italian Council of State is a legal and administrative consultative body that ensures the legality of public administration.
- Luxembourg Council of State
- (Nigeria) Nigerian Council of State
- North Carolina Council of State
- (Norway) Norwegian Council of State
- (South Korea) South Korean State Council is a national council constituted by South Korean cabinet, constitutionally empowered to deliberate important policies of executive branch of South Korean government
- (Spain) Spanish Council of State
- (Sweden) Swedish Council of State (1975-present)
- (Philippines) Philippine Council of State
- (Portugal) Portuguese Council of State is an advisory body of the President of the Republic
- (Thailand) Thai Council of State advises the executive branch on legal matters and until the establishment of the administrative courts in 1999, it also served as the supreme administrative court
- East Timorese Council of State is the political advisory body of the President of Timor-Leste
- (Turkey) Turkish Council of State is the supreme court for administrative justice

== Defunct ==
- (Empire of Brazil) Brazilian Empire's Council of State (1822–1889)
- (Myanmar) Council of State of the Socialist Republic of the Union of Burma (1974-1988)
- (Cambodia) Council of State of the People's Republic of Kampuchea (1981–1993)
- (Chile) Chilean Council of State (1976–1980)
- (Commonwealth of England) English Council of State (1649–1660)
- (East Germany) State Council of the German Democratic Republic (1960–1990)
- (British Raj) Indian Council of State (1919–1947)
- (Ethiopia) Ethiopian Council of State (1987–1991)
- (Israel) Israeli Provisional State Council (1948–1949)
- (Empire of Japan) Japanese Great Council of State (689–1885)
- (Liberia) Liberian Council of State was an interim governing body in the mid-1990s
- (Manchukuo) Manchukuon General Affairs State Council (1934–1945)
- (Principality of Montenegro) Montenegrin Council of State (1879–1905)
- (Ottoman Empire) Ottoman Council of State (1868–1922)
- (Qajar Iran) Persian Council of State (1858–)
- Poland:
  - Polish Kingdom's Council of State (1815-1915) (Poland)
  - Provisional Council of State (1917)
  - Polish Council of State (1947–1989)
- (Romania) Romanian State Council (1961–1989)
- (Thailand) Siamese Supreme Council of State (1925–1932)
- (Sweden) Swedish Council of State (1809–1974)
- (Tunisia) Tunisian Council of State (1959–2014)
- (Vietnam) Vietnamese Council of State (1980–1992)

== See also ==
- Council of State Governments
- State Council
- Council of Ministers
- Privy council
- Counsellor of State
