= List of chancellors of Washington University in St. Louis =

This is a list of chancellors of Washington University in St. Louis, which was founded in 1853.

== List ==
Chancellors of Washington University in St. Louis
No.	Image	Chancellor	Term start	Term end	Ref.
1		Joseph Gibson Hoyt	1858	November 26, 1862 (Note: Died in office.)	
2		William Chauvenet	1862	1869	
acting		Abram Litton	1869	1870	
3		William Greenleaf Eliot	1870	1887	
acting		Marshall Snow	1887	1891	
4		Winfield Scott Chaplin	1891	1907	
acting		Marshall Snow	1907	1908	
5		David Franklin Houston	1908	1917	
6		Frederic Aldin Hall	1917	1923	
7		Herbert S. Hadley	1923	December 1, 1927	
interim		George R. Throop	1927	1928	
8		George R. Throop	1928	1944	
acting		Henry Brookings Wallace	July 1944	September 1945	
9		Arthur Holly Compton	1945	December 1953	
interim		Ethan A.H. Shepley	December 1953	March 11, 1954	
10		Ethan A.H. Shepley	March 11, 1954	August 14, 1961	
11 acting		Carl Tolman	August 14, 1961	June 30, 1962	
12		Thomas H. Eliot	July 1, 1962	June 30, 1971	
13		William H. Danforth	July 1, 1971	June 30, 1995	
14		Mark S. Wrighton	July 1, 1995	May 30, 2019	
15		Andrew D. Martin	June 1, 2019	present	

Table notes
