= David F. Houston =

American politician (1866–1940)

David Houston
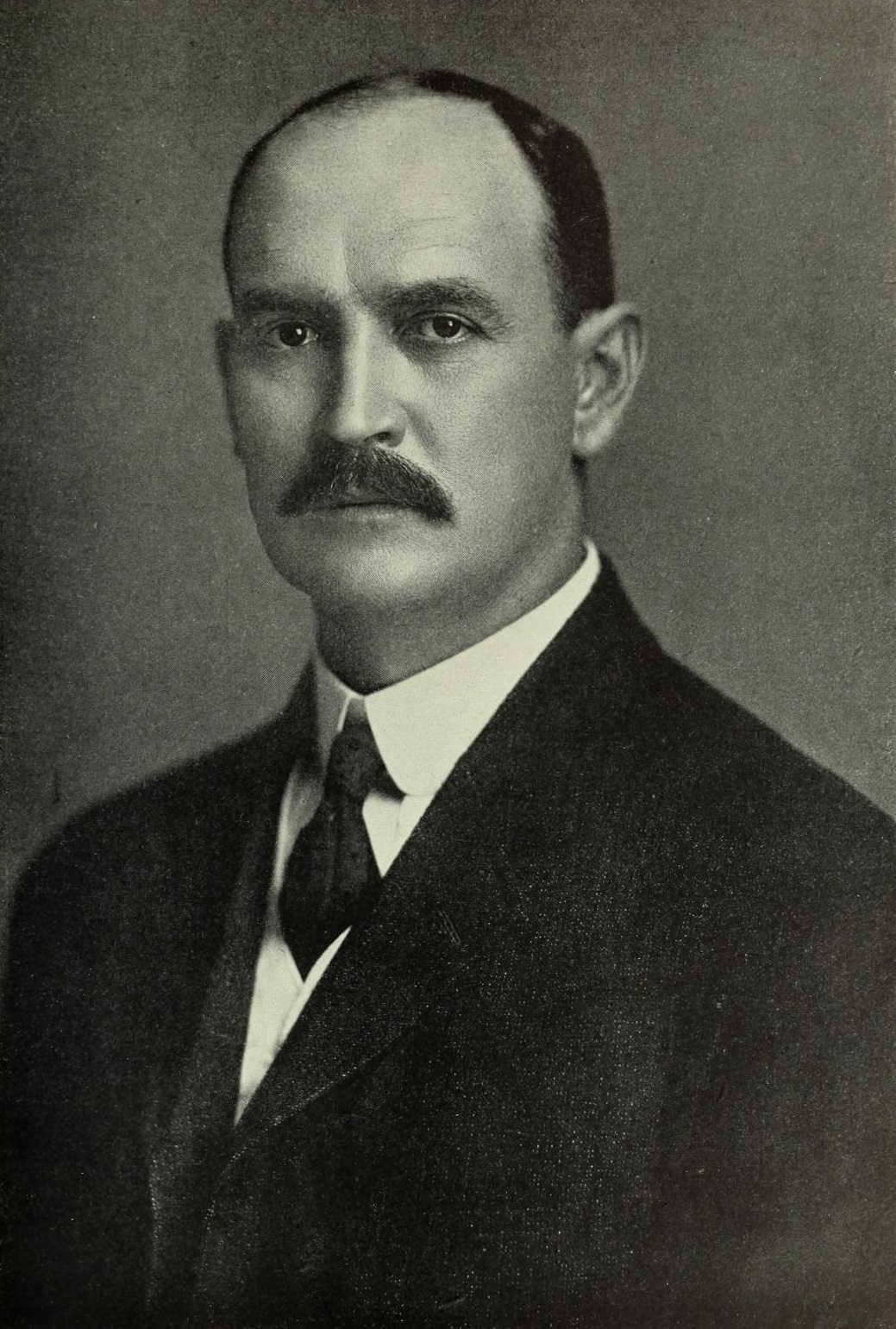
- David F. Houston c. 1906

48th United States Secretary of the Treasury
- In office February 2, 1920 – March 3, 1921
- President: Woodrow Wilson
- Preceded by: Carter Glass
- Succeeded by: Andrew Mellon

5th United States Secretary of Agriculture
- In office March 6, 1913 – February 2, 1920
- President: Woodrow Wilson
- Preceded by: Jim Wilson
- Succeeded by: Edwin T. Meredith

8th Chancellor of Washington University
- In office 1908–1913
- Preceded by: Marshall Snow (Acting)
- Succeeded by: Frederic Hall

4th President of the University of Texas
- In office September 1, 1905 – September 1, 1908
- Preceded by: William Prather
- Succeeded by: Sidney Mezes

6th President of the Agricultural and Mechanical College of Texas
- In office July 1, 1902 – September 1, 1905
- Preceded by: Roger H. Whitlock (Acting)
- Succeeded by: Henry Harrington

Personal details
- Born: David Franklin Houston; February 17, 1866 Monroe, North Carolina, U.S.
- Died: September 2, 1940 (aged 74) New York City, U.S.
- Party: Democratic
- Spouse: Helen Beall (m. 1895)
- Children: 5, including Lawrence

Academic background
- Education: University of South Carolina (BA); Harvard University (MA)

Academic work
- Discipline: Political science
- Institutions: University of Texas at Austin; Texas A&M University; Washington University
- Notable works: A Critical Study of Nullification in South Carolina (1896); Eight Years with Wilson's Cabinet (1926)

David Franklin Houston (February 17, 1866 – September 2, 1940) was an American academic, businessman and Democratic politician. Born in Monroe, North Carolina, he obtained his undergraduate degree from the University of South Carolina and his Master's from Harvard University. He was president of the Agricultural and Mechanical College of Texas and University of Texas at Austin and later the chancellor of Washington University, where he established the School of Architecture (now part of the Sam Fox School of Design & Visual Arts). He served under President Wilson as the 5th Secretary of Agriculture and the 48th United States Secretary of the Treasury. He later became the president of Bell Telephone Securities, a vice president at AT&T and president of the Mutual Life Insurance Company of New York.

== Early life and family ==
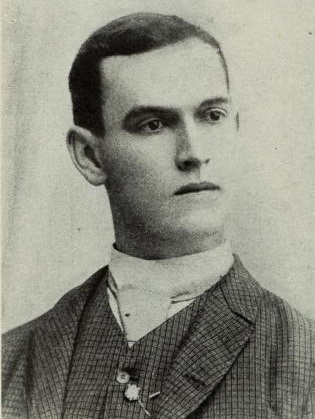
Young Houston age 19, (April 1885).

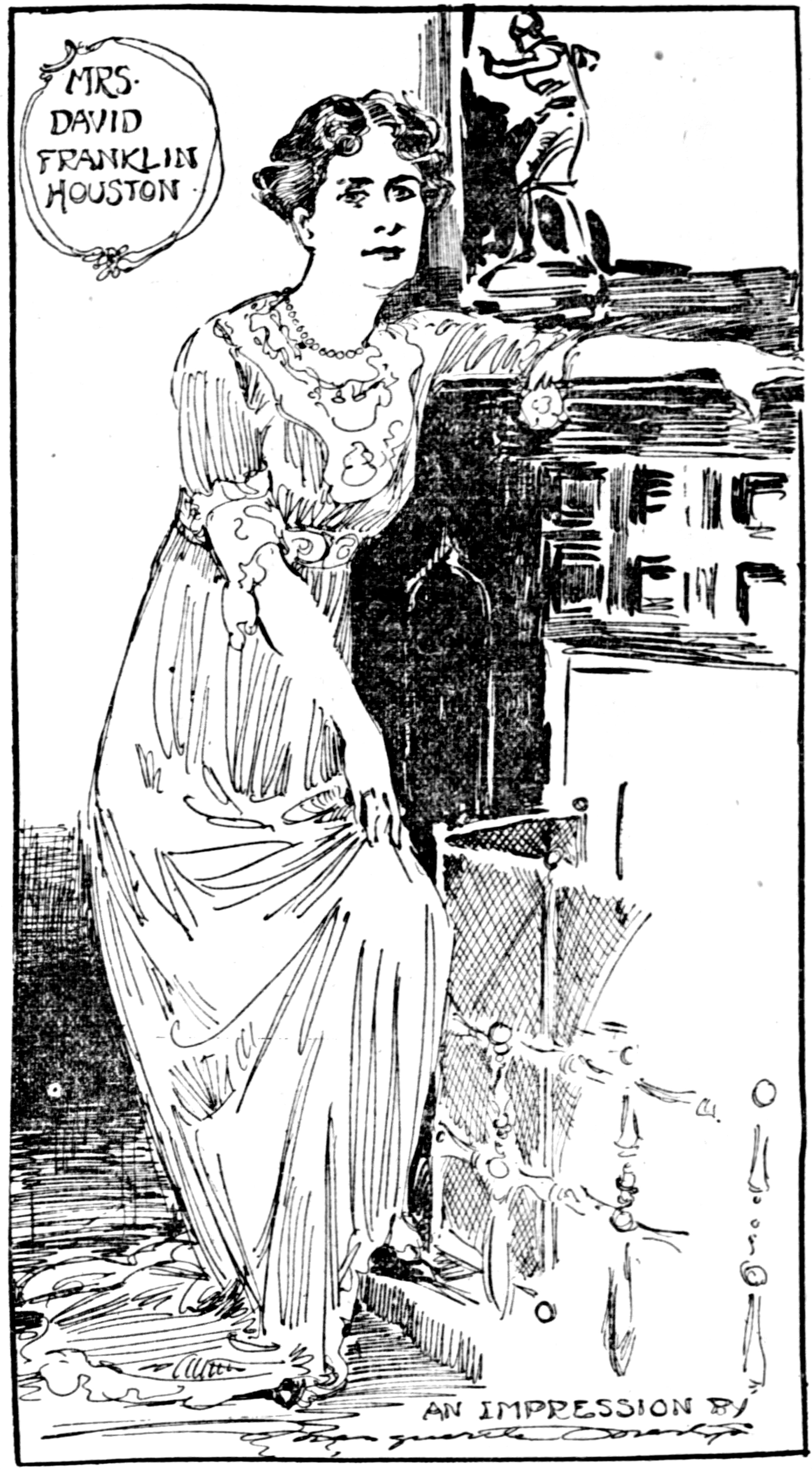
Helen Beall Houston, 1913, sketched by Marguerite Martyn

Houston was born in Monroe, North Carolina, on February 17, 1866. He was the son of William Henry Houston, a horse dealer and grocer, and his wife, the former Pamela Ann Stevens. He graduated from the University of South Carolina in 1887, with honors, and completed his graduate work at Harvard University, where he received a M.A. in political science in 1892. Houston married Helen Beall on December 11, 1895. They had five children: David Franklin, Jr., Duval, Elizabeth, Helen and Lawrence R. Houston.

== Higher education ==
Houston taught political science at the University of Texas at Austin. He became an adjunct member of the faculty in 1894 and was named dean of the faculty in 1899. He then became the president of the Agricultural and Mechanical College of Texas (now Texas A&M University) from 1902 until 1905. In 1905 he returned to the University of Texas to become the president of the institution, serving until 1908. During his tenure at UT, the school opened a doctoral program and a law school.

Houston left Texas to serve as chancellor of Washington University in St. Louis, after being recommended by Charles W. Eliot, the president of Harvard University. He held the position from 1908 to 1913. During his tenure he established the School of Architecture (now part of the Sam Fox School of Design & Visual Arts) and strengthened the medical school through partnerships with Children's and Barnes hospitals. He left the university to become the U.S. Secretary of Agriculture.

Under President William McKinley he was on the board of visitors of the United States Military Academy at West Point. Later in life, he was an overseer of Harvard University and on the Columbia University Board of Trustees.

== Politics and ready for Wilson's administration ==
Houston served as President Woodrow Wilson's Secretary of Agriculture from 1913 to 1920. During his time as Agriculture Secretary many important agricultural laws were passed by the U.S. Congress, including the Smith–Lever Act of 1914, the Federal Farm Loan Act, the Tobacco Inspection Act, and the Federal Aid Road Act of 1916. However following the Food and Fuel Control Act responsibility for food was handed over to Herbert Hoover at the United States Food Administration. Hoover only accepted the position on the basis he would be free from interference from Houston.

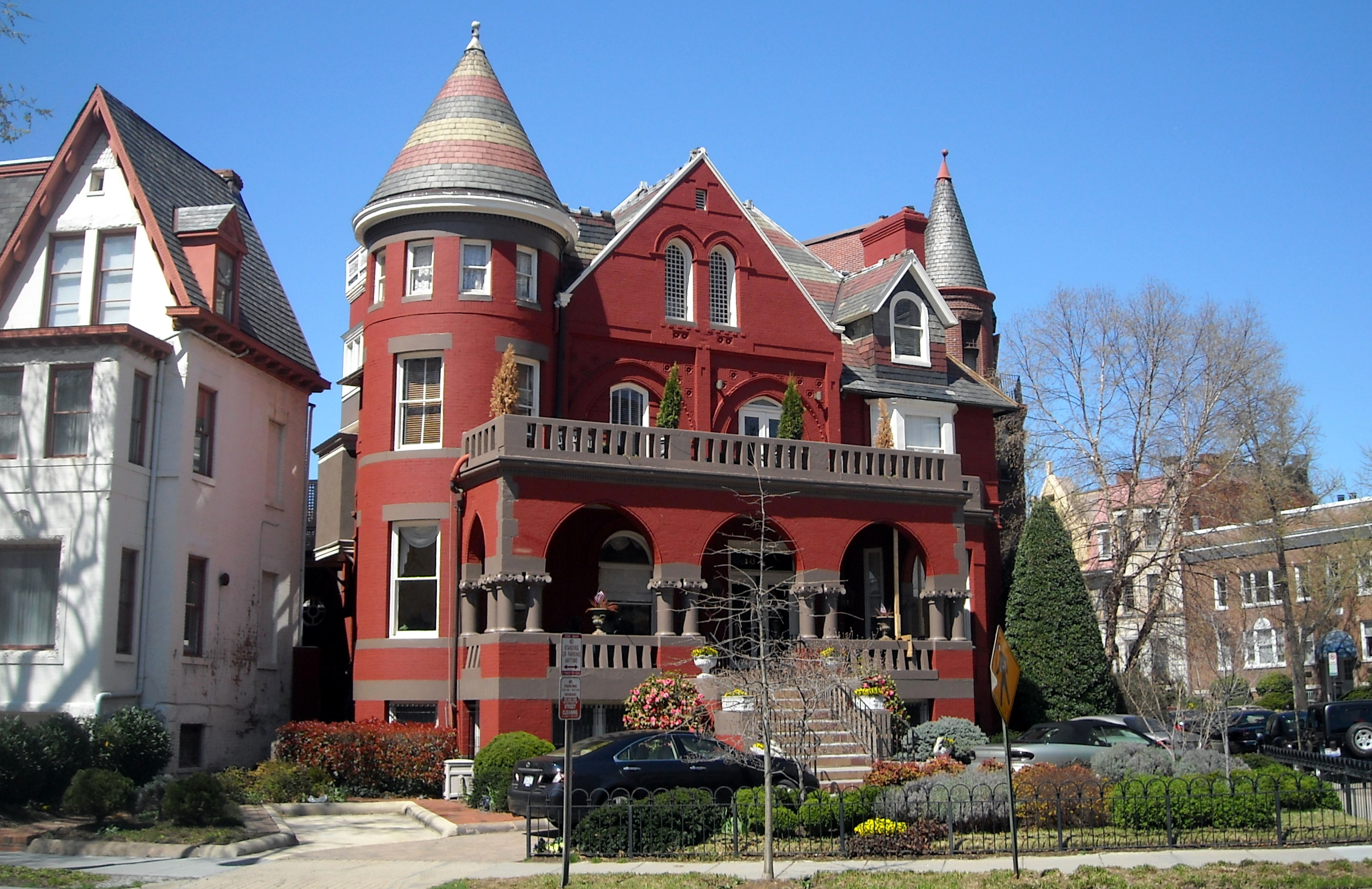
Houston's former house in the Dupont Circle neighborhood of Washington, D.C.

He became the United States Secretary of the Treasury from 1920 to 1921 shortly following the World War I. His brief tenure was marked by stormy controversies over federal monetary policies. As ex officio Chairman of the Federal Reserve Board, he issued severe warnings and, increased rediscount rates in order to prevent the inflation that the European allies were experiencing. Houston predicted a fall in U.S. prices, particularly of farm products, after the optimism of the Armistice wore off. He pushed for easier credit for farmers and urged them to produce less.

But when prices fell more dramatically than expected in 1920, farm spokesmen unfairly accused Houston of deliberately wrecking agrarian prosperity. Abroad, England and France were pushing to cancel their war debts. Houston, the U.S. Congress and the President, against cancellation, converted the short-term debts to long-term loans. Houston resigned at the end of President Wilson's term, after only a year in office.

During his time in government Houston advocated other progressive measures such as the provision of a proper system of personal credit unions, aiding land settlement, the encouragement of farm ownership, and improvements in rural health and sanitation. In regards to the latter, Houston stated that “To what extent the further projection of effort is a matter for state or local action remains to be determined, but it seems clear that there should be no cessation of activity until there has been completed, in every community of the Union, an effective sanitary survey and, through the provision of adequate machinery, steps taken to control and eliminate the sources of disease and to provide the necessary modern medical and dental facilities easily accessible to the mass of the people.” Houston also argued that "The farmer, as well as the industrial worker, is entitled to a living wage and to a reasonable profit on his investment." He also argued that "We are all in sympathy with rational proposals for the improvement of the masses of the less fortunate people of the Nation and of the world, but this improvement must come by orderly processes. And we must recognize that, after all, the real progress of humanity is slow."

== Business ==
After leaving the Federal government of the United States, Houston became as the president of the Bell Telephone Securities and a vice president at AT&T. Houston also served as a director of AT&T, the Guaranty Trust Company and U.S. Steel. He was president of the Mutual Life Insurance Company of New York for ten years.

== Death ==
Houston died of a heart attack on September 2, 1940, at Columbia Presbyterian Medical Center in New York City. He was buried next to his wife at Saint John's Church Cemetery in Laurel Hollow, New York.

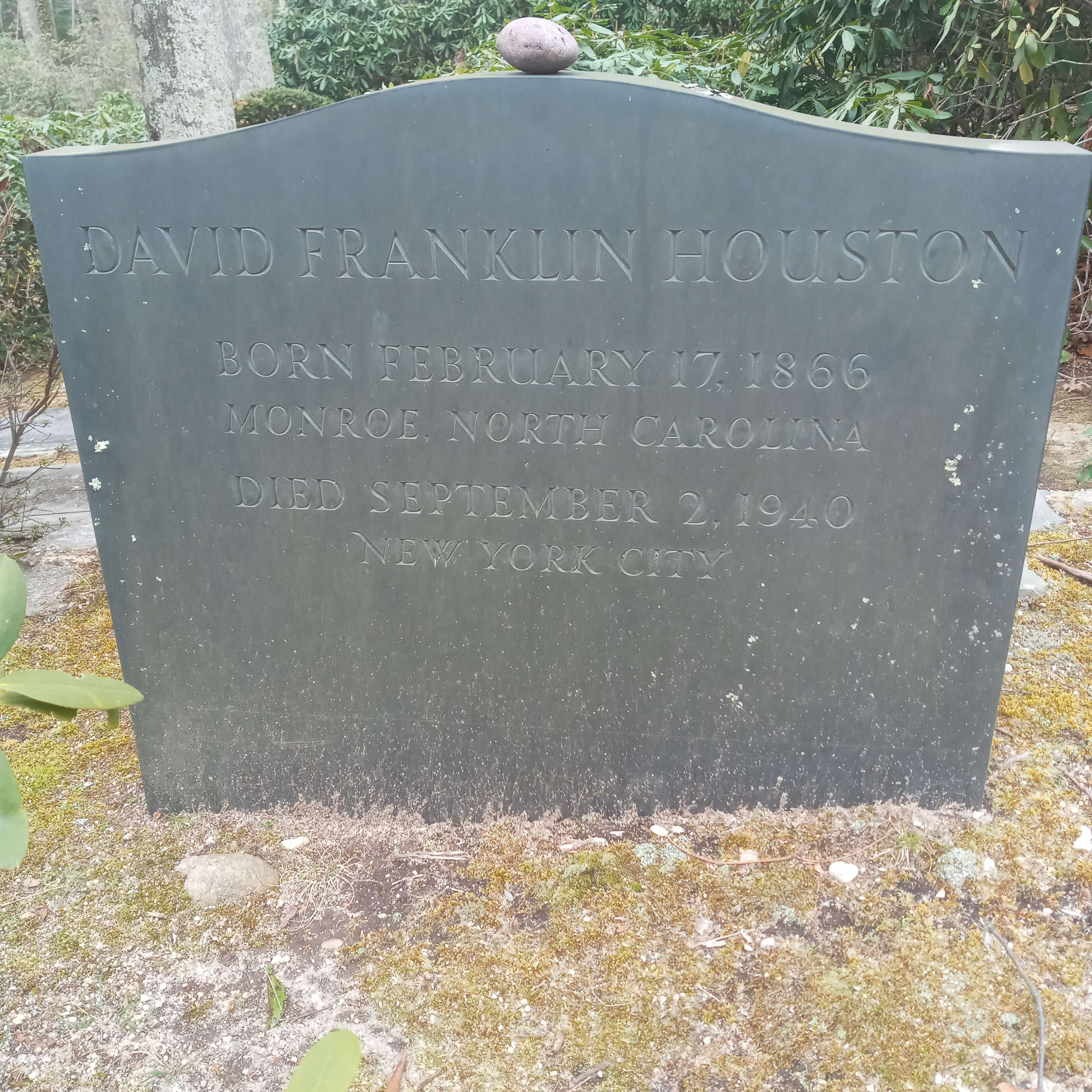
The gravesite of Secretary Houston

== Writings ==
Houston published A Critical Study of Nullification in South Carolina (1896) to establish his place in academia. He later published a two-volume memoir of his experiences as a cabinet member, Eight Years with Wilson's Cabinet.

Academic offices
Preceded by Roger H. Whitlock	President of the A&M College of Texas; 1902 – 1905	Succeeded by Henry Hill Harrington
Preceded by William L. Prather	President of the University of Texas; 1905 – 1908	Succeeded by Sidney E. Mezes
Preceded by William S. Chaplin	Chancellor of Washington University; 1908 – 1917	Succeeded by Frederic Aldin Hall
Political offices
Preceded by James Wilson	U.S. Secretary of Agriculture; Served under: Woodrow Wilson; March 6, 1913 – February 2, 1920	Succeeded by Edwin T. Meredith
Preceded by Carter Glass	U.S. Secretary of the Treasury; Served under: Woodrow Wilson; February 2, 1920 – March 3, 1921	Succeeded by Andrew W. Mellon
