= Edwin T. Meredith =

American businessman and entrepreneur (1876–1928)

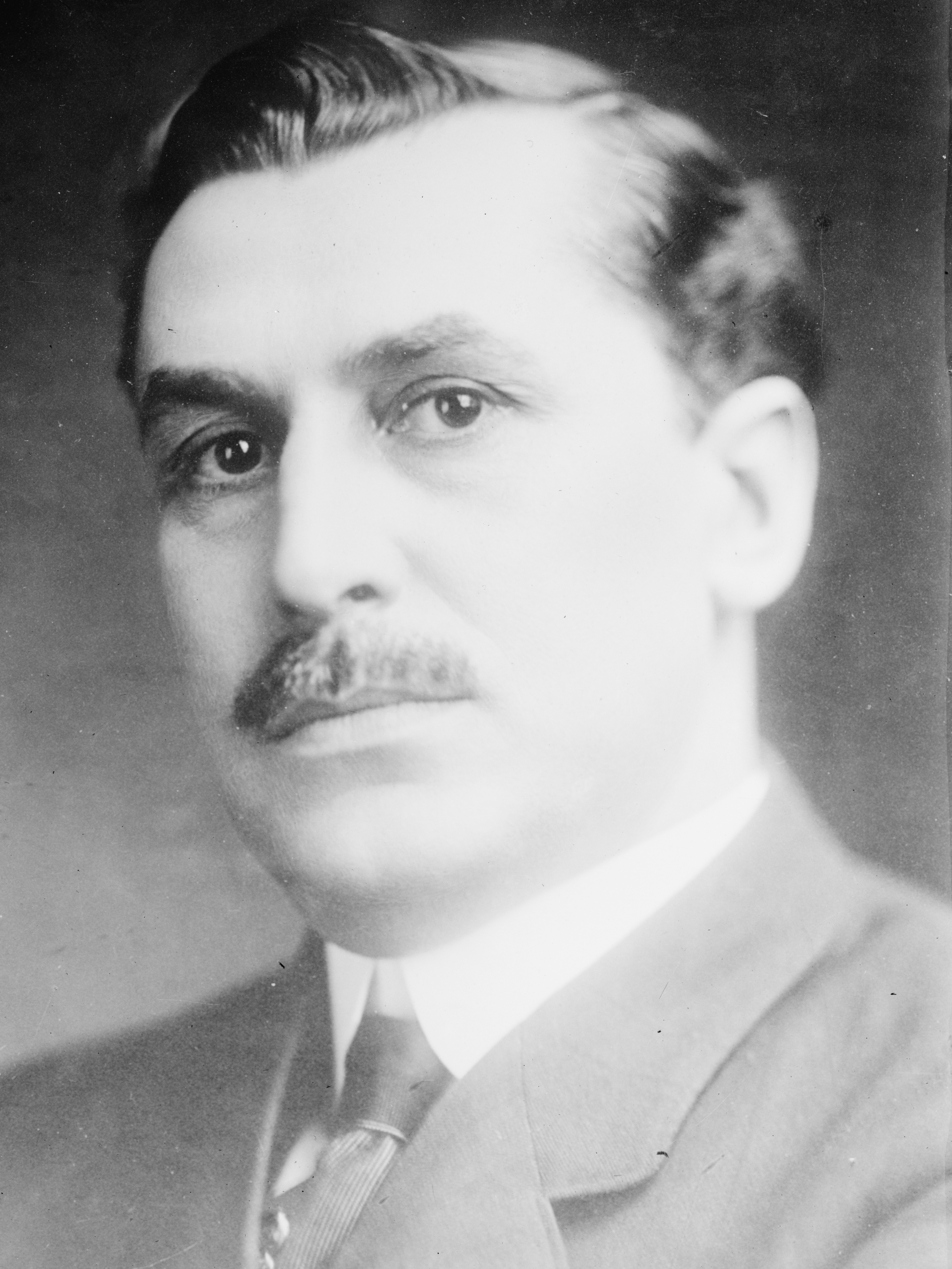

6th United States Secretary of Agriculture
- In office February 2, 1920 – March 4, 1921
- President: Woodrow Wilson
- Preceded by: David F. Houston
- Succeeded by: Harry Wallace

Personal details
- Born: Edwin Thomas Meredith; December 23, 1876 Avoca, Iowa, U.S.
- Died: June 17, 1928 (aged 51) Des Moines, Iowa, U.S.
- Party: Democratic
- Spouse: Edna Elliott
- Children: 2
- Education: Des Moines University

Edwin Thomas Meredith (December 23, 1876 – June 17, 1928) was an American entrepreneur, founder of the Meredith Corporation and also served as the U.S. secretary of agriculture in President Woodrow Wilson's administration.

== Early life and politics ==
Meredith was born in Avoca, Iowa, on December 23, 1876, to Minerva Jane (née Marsh) and Thomas Oliver Meredith. He attended Highland Park College in Des Moines. In 1894, Meredith became the general manager of Farmer's Tribune, a Populist newspaper run by his grandfather.

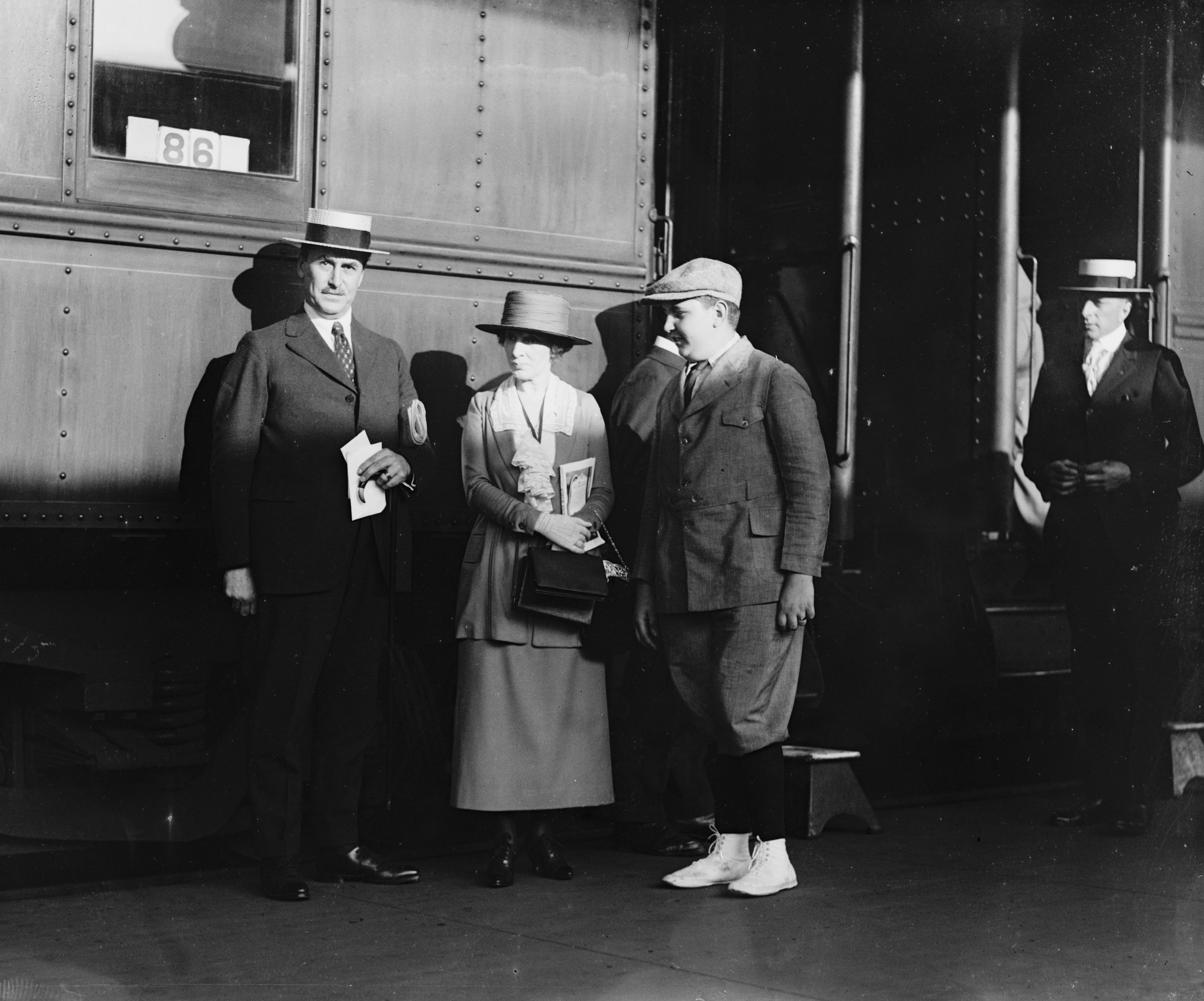
Edwin T. Meredith and his family

Meredith married Edna C. Elliott on January 8, 1896. They resided in Des Moines and were the parents of two children, Edwin T. "Ed" Meredith II, and Mildred M. Bohen.

Meredith ran the Farmer's Tribune until 1902, when he began publishing his own magazine, Successful Farming, which reached 100,000 subscribers by 1908.

Meredith served as vice president and president of the Agricultural Publishers Association and was a member of the board of directors of the United States Chamber of Commerce from 1915 until 1919, and again from 1923 until his death.

== Wilson administration ==
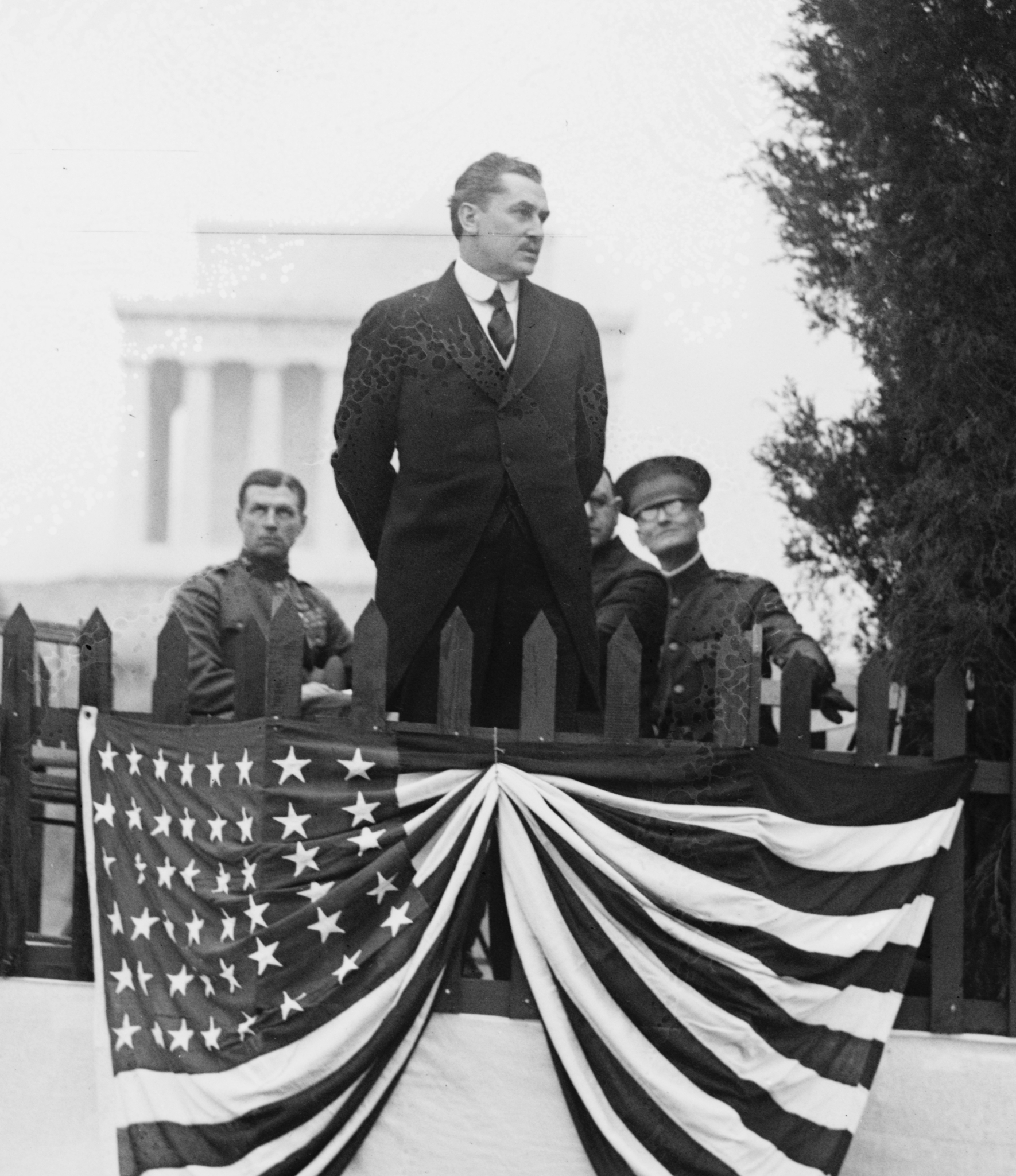
Secretary Meredith speaking at an Arbor Day event, c. 1920

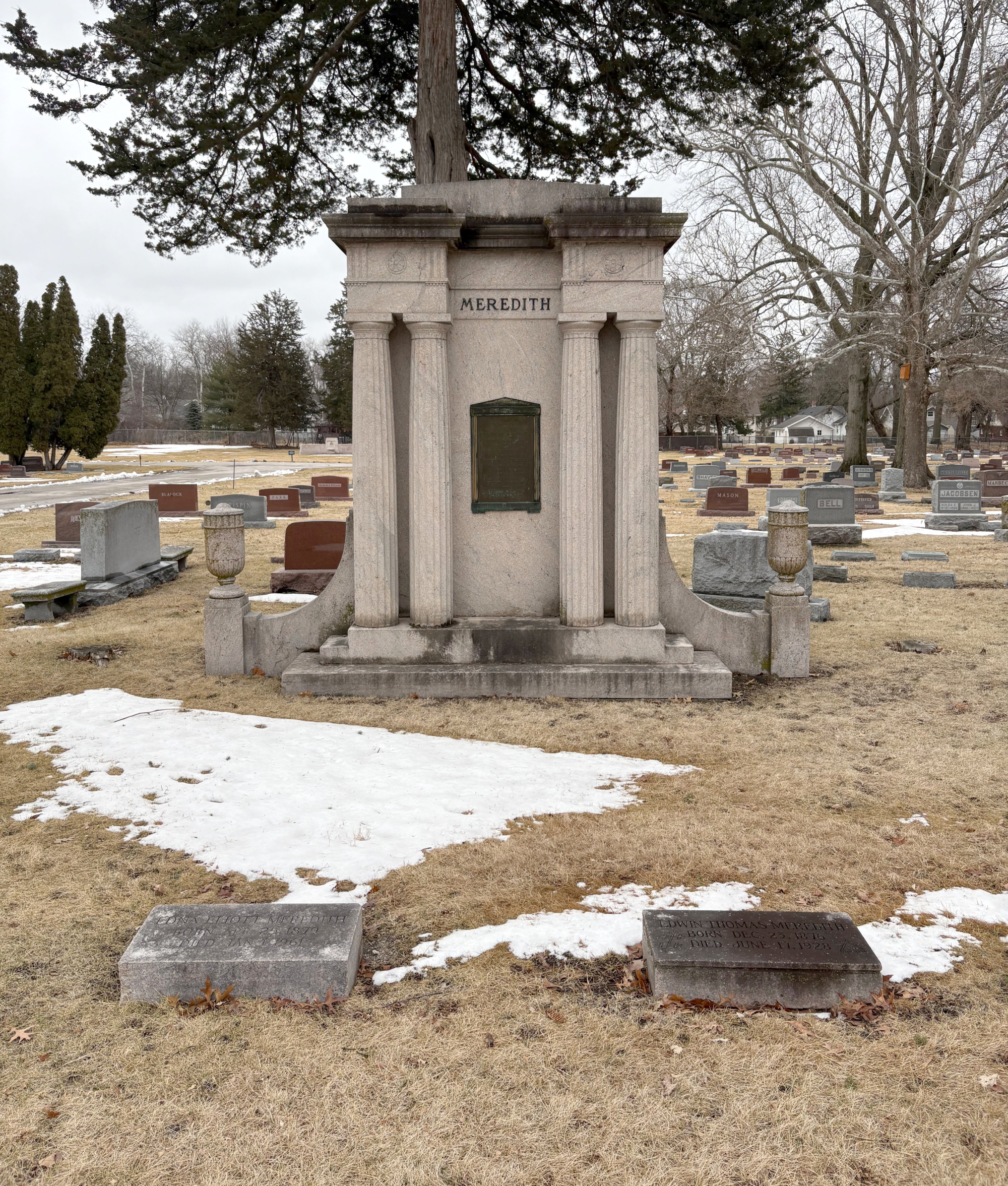
Meredith's grave at Masonic Cemetery

Once a member of the Populist Party, he was later active as a Democrat, and ran unsuccessfully for a U.S. Senate seat in 1914. In 1916, he ran unsuccessfully for governor.

Despite his unsuccessful campaigns, Meredith maintained a high profile among rural voters and farmers because of his magazine. As a result, Woodrow Wilson appointed him to the Treasury Department's Advisory Committee on Excess Profits, and he served on the board of directors of the Federal Reserve Bank of Chicago from 1918 until 1920.

In 1918 Wilson appointed Meredith to the American War Mission, which visited England and France to observe U.S. military activities and report to Wilson on recommendations for improving conditions for service members serving in World War I.

On February 2, 1920, Meredith was appointed Secretary of Agriculture, succeeding David F. Houston, who had been appointed Secretary of the Treasury.

== Later career ==
He was succeeded by Henry C. Wallace at the start of Warren G. Harding's administration in 1921, and he returned to publishing. He bought the Dairy Farmer in 1922, and later started Fruit, Garden, and Home, which he later renamed Better Homes and Gardens.

In 1924, Meredith supported William G. McAdoo for president. When the convention deadlocked, Meredith allowed his name to be put forward as Iowa's favorite son before the nomination went to John W. Davis on the 103rd ballot. Davis personally offered the vice presidential nomination to Meredith, but he refused the offer. Meredith's supporters planned to suggest his name for president again in 1928, but he declined because of illness.

Meredith died in Des Moines on June 17, 1928, and was buried at Glendale Masonic Cemetery in Des Moines.

After his death his company, the Meredith Corporation, continued publication of Better Homes and Gardens and other magazines. He was later inducted into the Advertising Hall of Fame. In 2008, Meredith was named by Professional Remodeler magazine as one of the 11 most influential people in the history of remodeling.

Party political offices
Preceded by John Taylor Hamilton	Democratic nominee for Governor of Iowa; 1916	Succeeded by Claude R. Porter
Political offices
Preceded by David F. Houston	United States Secretary of Agriculture; 1920–1921	Succeeded by Harry Wallace
