= 1960 Missouri Secretary of State election =

- November 8, 1960
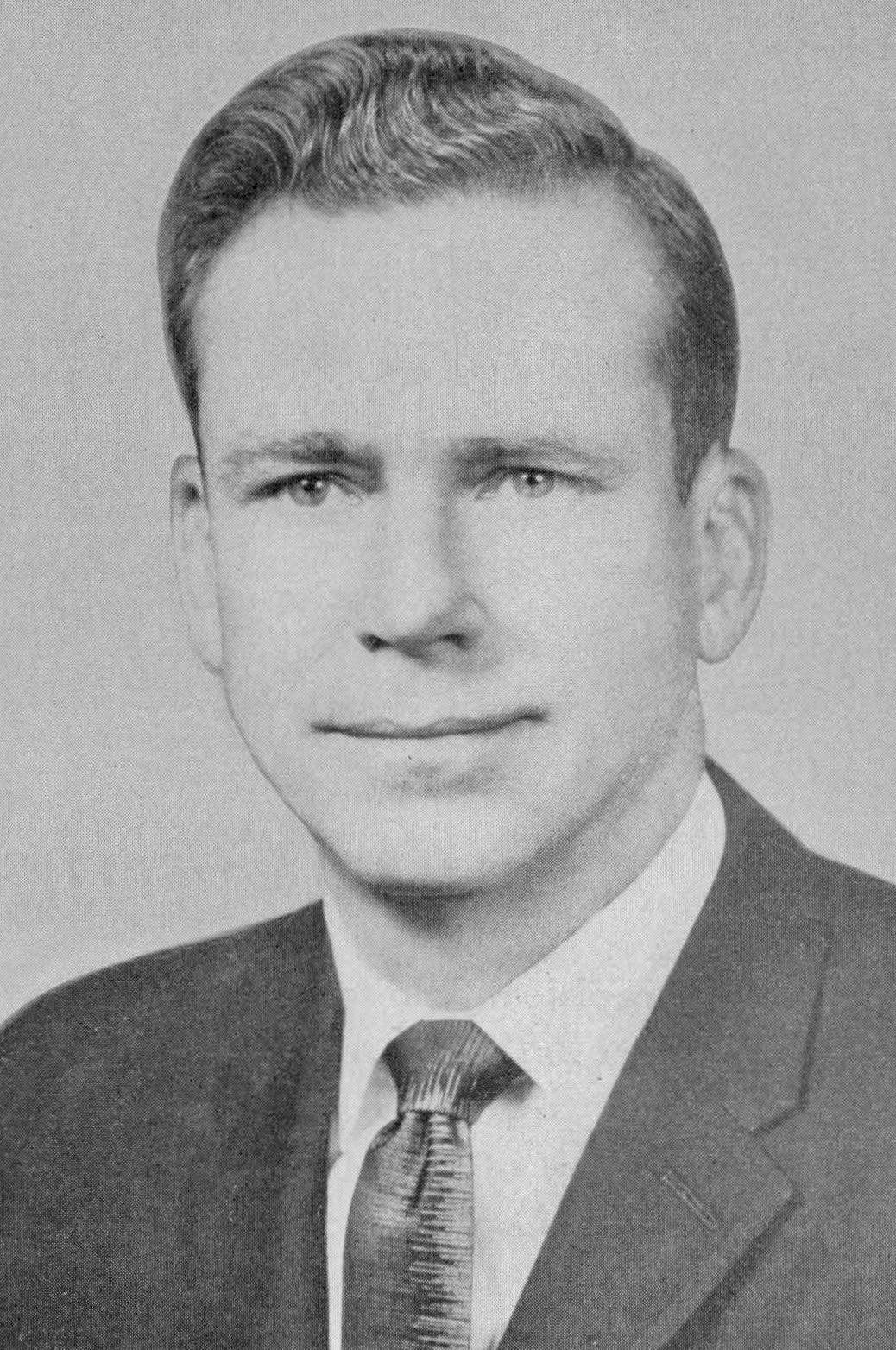

Nominee	Warren E. Hearnes	Joseph M. Badgett
Party	Democratic	Republican
Popular vote	1,046,723	816,398
Percentage	56.18%	43.82%
Secretary of State before election
Robert W. Crawford (Acting)
Democratic
Elected Secretary of State
Warren E. Hearnes
Democratic

The 1960 Missouri Secretary of State election was held on November 8, 1960, in order to elect the secretary of state of Missouri. Democratic nominee and incumbent member of the Missouri House of Representatives Warren E. Hearnes defeated Republican nominee Joseph M. Badgett.

== General election ==
On election day, November 8, 1960, Democratic nominee Warren E. Hearnes won the election by a margin of 230,325 votes against his opponent Republican nominee Joseph M. Badgett, thereby retaining Democratic control over the office of secretary of state. Hearnes was sworn in as the 31st secretary of state of Missouri on January 9, 1961.

=== Results ===
Missouri Secretary of State election, 1960
Party	Candidate	Votes	%
Democratic	Warren E. Hearnes	1,046,723	56.18
Republican	Joseph M. Badgett	816,398	43.82
Total votes		1,863,121	100.00
Democratic hold			

== See also ==
- 1960 Missouri gubernatorial election
