= I've Been Working on the Railroad =

American folk song

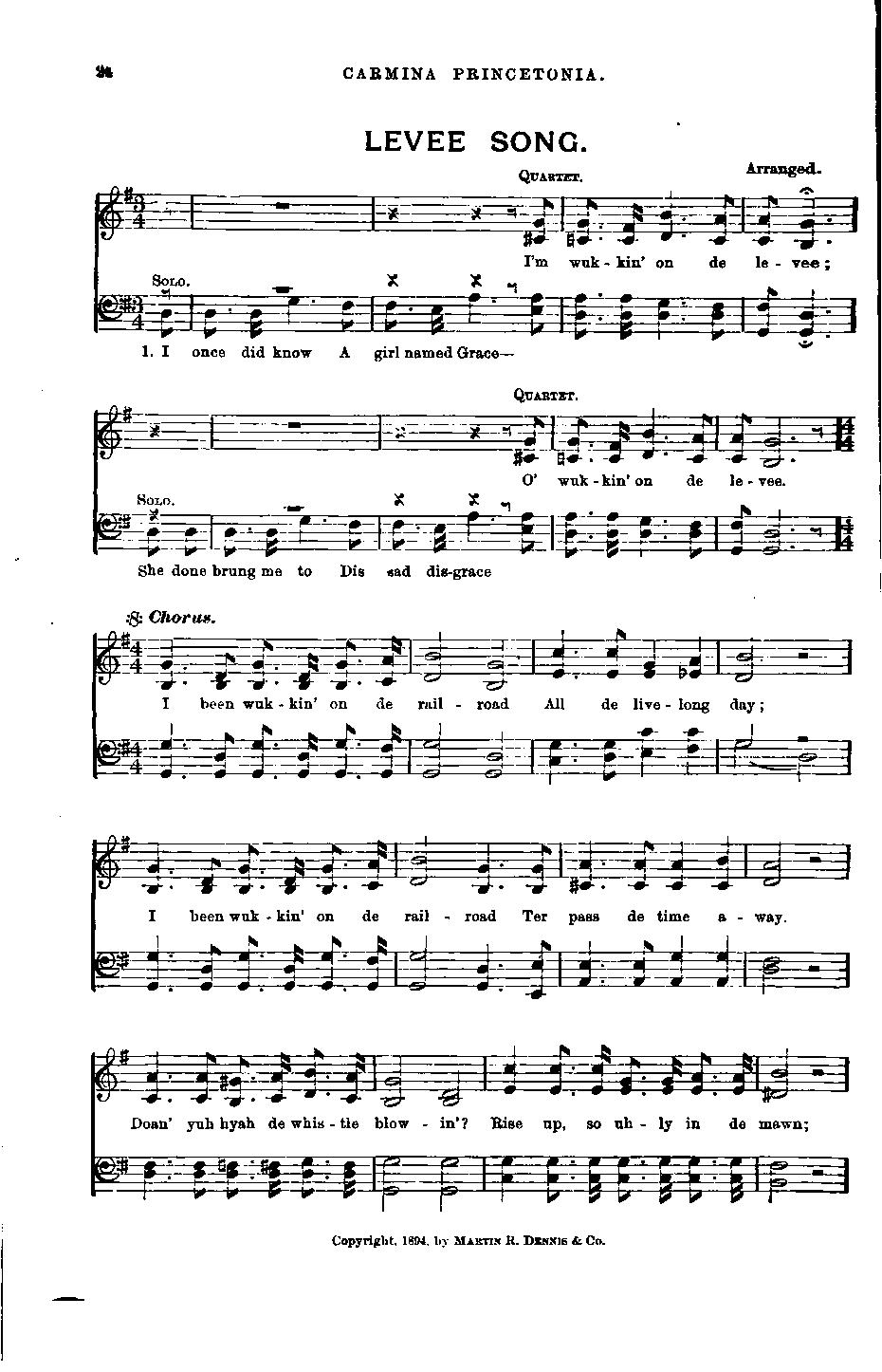
- "I've Been Working on the Railroad", published as Levee Song in the Princeton University compilation Carmina Princetonia, 1898

Song
- Published: 1894; 132 years ago
- Songwriter: Traditional

"I've Been Working on the Railroad" is an American folk song. The first published version appeared as "Levee Song" in Carmina Princetonia, a book of Princeton University songs published in 1894. The earliest known recording is by The Shannon Quartet, released by Victor Records in 1923.

== Music ==
The melody of the opening line of "I've Been Working on the Railroad" may have been inspired by the very similar melody at the beginning of the cello solo, about one minute into Franz von Suppé's 1846 Poet and Peasant overture.

== Lyrics ==
The verses that generally constitute the modern version of the song are:

I've been working on the railroad
All the live-long day.
I've been working on the railroad
Just to pass the time away.

Can't you hear the whistle blowing,
Rise up so early in the morn;
Can't you hear the captain shouting,
"Dinah, blow your horn!"

Dinah, won't you blow,
Dinah, won't you blow,
Dinah, won't you blow your horn?
Dinah, won't you blow,
Dinah, won't you blow,
Dinah, won't you blow your horn?

Someone's in the kitchen with Dinah.
Someone's in the kitchen, I know.
Someone's in the kitchen with Dinah,
Strummin' on the old banjo!

Singin' fee, fie, fiddly-i-o
Fee, fie, fiddly-i-o-o-o-o
Fee, fie, fiddly-i-o
Strummin' on the old banjo.

The 1894 version includes one verse very much like the modern song, though in Minstrel dialect, with an intro that is no longer sung and a very different second verse:

(SOLO) I once did know a girl named Grace--
(QUARTET) I'm wukkin' on de levee;
(SOLO) She done brung me to dis sad disgrace
(QUARTET) O' wukkin' on de levee.

I been wukkin' on de railroad
All de livelong day,
I been wukkin' on de railroad
Ter pass de time away.
Doan' yuh hyah de whistle blowin'?
Ris up, so uhly in de mawn;
Doan' yuh hyah de cap'n shouin',
"Dinah, blow yo' hawn?"

Sing a song o' the city;
Roll dat cotton bale;
Niggah aint half so happy
As when he's out o' jail
Norfolk foh its oystahshells,
Boston foh its beans,
Chahleston foh its rice an' cawn,
But foh niggahs New Awleens.

The "Someone's in the Kitchen with Dinah" section, with its noticeably different melody, is actually an older song that has been absorbed by "I've Been Working on the Railroad". It was published as "Old Joe, or Somebody in the House with Dinah" in London in the 1830s or '40s, with music credited to J.H. Cave. "Dinah", an abducted woman from the biblical story of Genesis, was a generic name for a slave woman and, by extension, any woman of African-American descent. The melody for this section of the song may have been adapted from "Goodnight, Ladies", written (as "Farewell Ladies") in 1847 by E.P. Christy.

According to the liner notes to Pete Seeger's Children's Concert at Town Hall (1963), the "Dinah won't you blow" section is a more modern addition, contributed to the song by "some college students".

== Other extant verses and stanzas ==
One extant verse that has been recorded in prominent sources follows the "Singin' fee, fie, fiddly-i-o" verse:

Someone's makin' love to Dinah
Someone's making love I know.
Someone's making love to Dinah
'Cause I can't hear the old banjo!

In another version of "I've Been Working on the Railroad" that is printed in "The Family Car Songbook", researched and edited by Tam Mossman, the song continues as follows:

I've been working on the trestle,
Driving spikes that grip.
I've been working on the trestle,
To be sure the ties won't slip.
Can't you hear the engine coming?
Run to the stanchion of the bridge!
Can't you see the big black smokestack
Coming down the ridge?

Chorus

I've been living in the boxcars.
I'm a hobo now.
I've been living in the boxcars,
Which the yard bulls won't allow.
Brother, can you spare a quarter?
Buy me something good to eat?
Brother, can you spare a nickel,
Till I'm on my feet?

Chorus

I'll be owner of this railroad
One of these here days.
I'll be owner of this railroad,
And I swear, your pay I'll raise.
I'll invite you to my mansion,
Feed you on goose and terrapin.
I'll invite you to the racetrack
When my ship comes in.

Chorus

== "The Eyes of Texas" ==
"The Eyes of Texas" is the spirit song of the University of Texas at Austin and the University of Texas at El Paso. It is set to the tune of "I've Been Working on the Railroad" with alternate lyrics written in 1904. Students, faculty, staff, and alumni of the university sing the song at Longhorn sports games and other events.
