= 1916 Iowa gubernatorial election =

- November 7, 1916
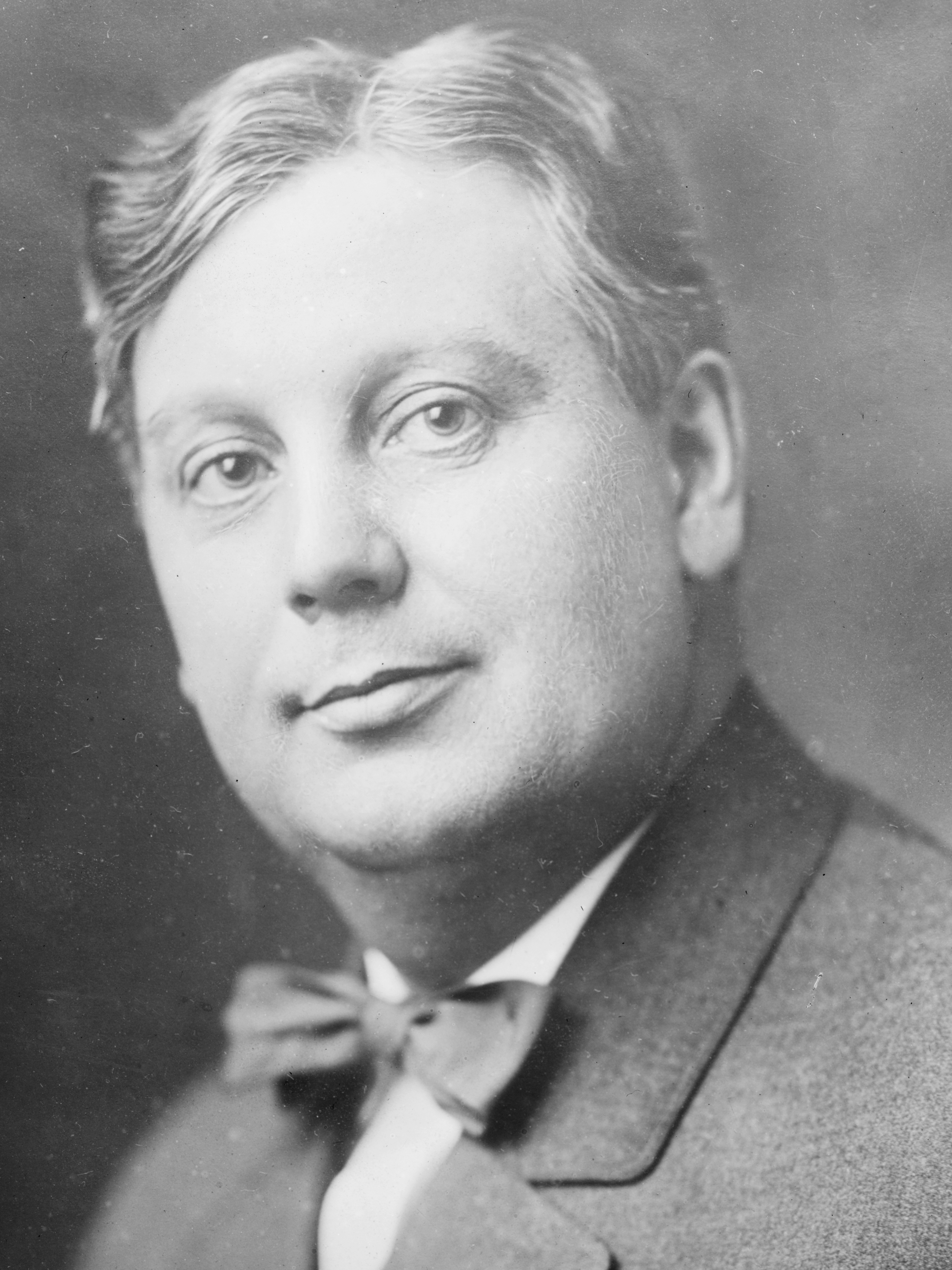

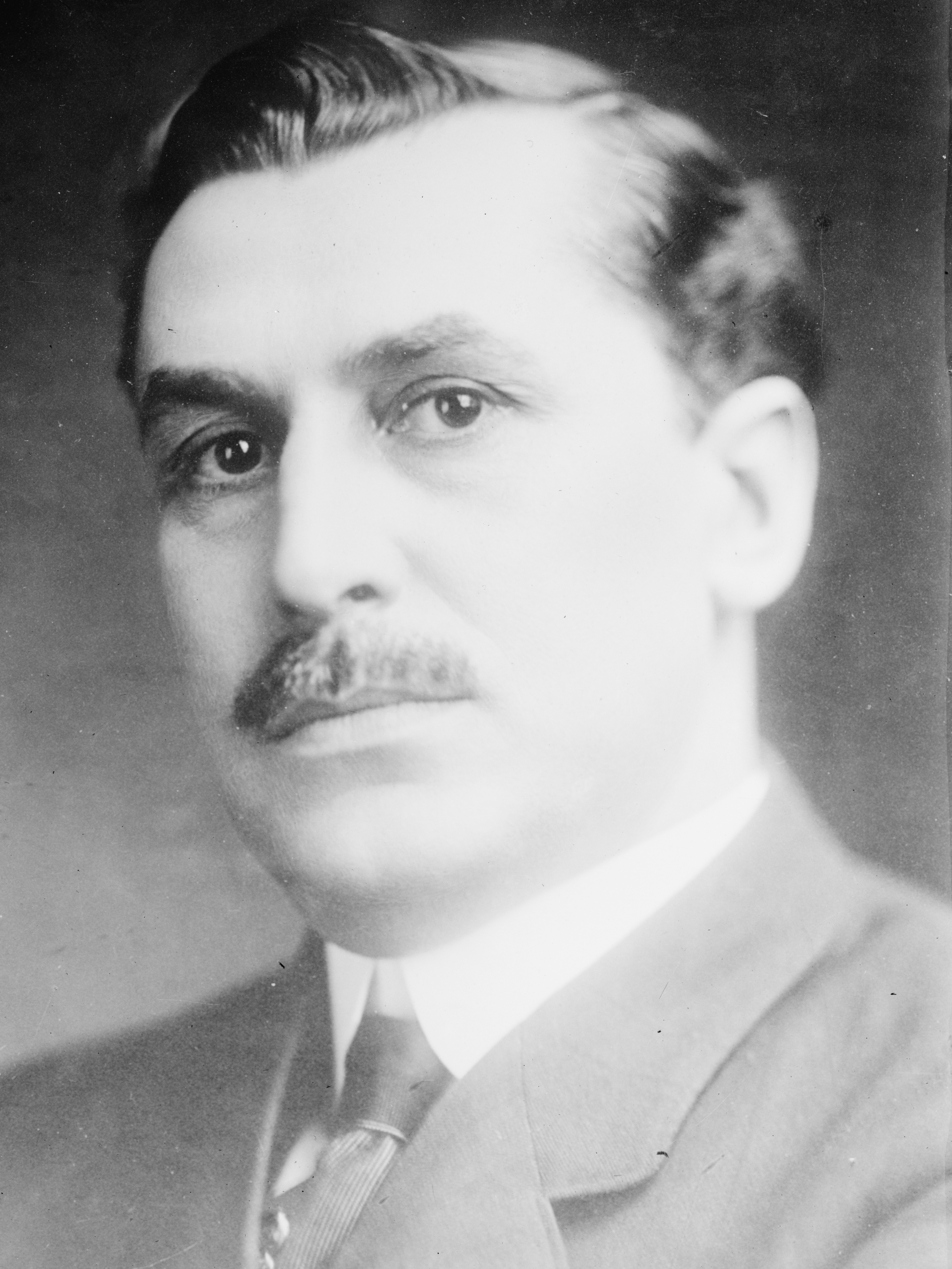
Nominee	William L. Harding	Edwin T. Meredith
Party	Republican	Democratic
Popular vote	313,586	186,832
Percentage	61.03%	36.36%
- County results Harding: 40–50% 50–60% 60–70% 70–80% Meredith: 50–60%
Governor before election
George W. Clarke
Republican
Elected Governor
William L. Harding
Republican

The 1916 Iowa gubernatorial election was held on November 7, 1916. Republican nominee William L. Harding defeated Democratic nominee Edwin T. Meredith with 61.03% of the vote.

== General election ==
=== Candidates ===
Major party candidates

- William L. Harding, Republican
- Edwin T. Meredith, Democratic

Other candidates

- John W. Bennett, Socialist
- Oren D. Ellett, Prohibition
- Stephen H. Bashor, Progressive
- Arthur S. Dowler, Socialist Labor

=== Results ===
1916 Iowa gubernatorial election
Party	Candidate	Votes	%	±%
Republican	William L. Harding	313,586	61.03%	
Democratic	Edwin T. Meredith	186,832	36.36%	
Socialist	John W. Bennett	8,200	1.60%	
Prohibition	Oren D. Ellett	2,880	0.56%	
Progressive	Stephen H. Bashor	2,035	0.40%	
Socialist Labor	Arthur S. Dowler	315	0.06%	
Majority		126,754		
Turnout				
Republican hold		Swing		
