= The Eyes of Texas =

School spirit song

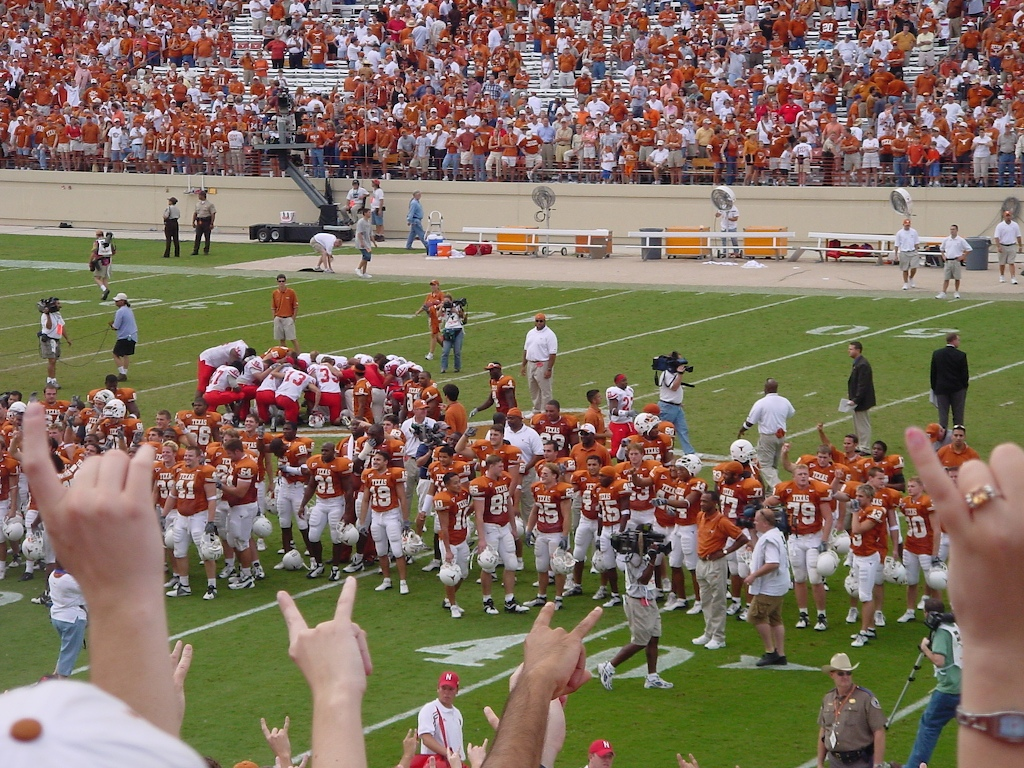
UT students and football players singing "The Eyes of Texas" after a win over Nebraska

"The Eyes of Texas" is the school spirit song of the University of Texas at Austin. It is set to the tune of "I've Been Working on the Railroad". Students, faculty, staff, and alumni of the university sing the song at Texas Longhorns sports games, before the fireworks and other events.

== History ==
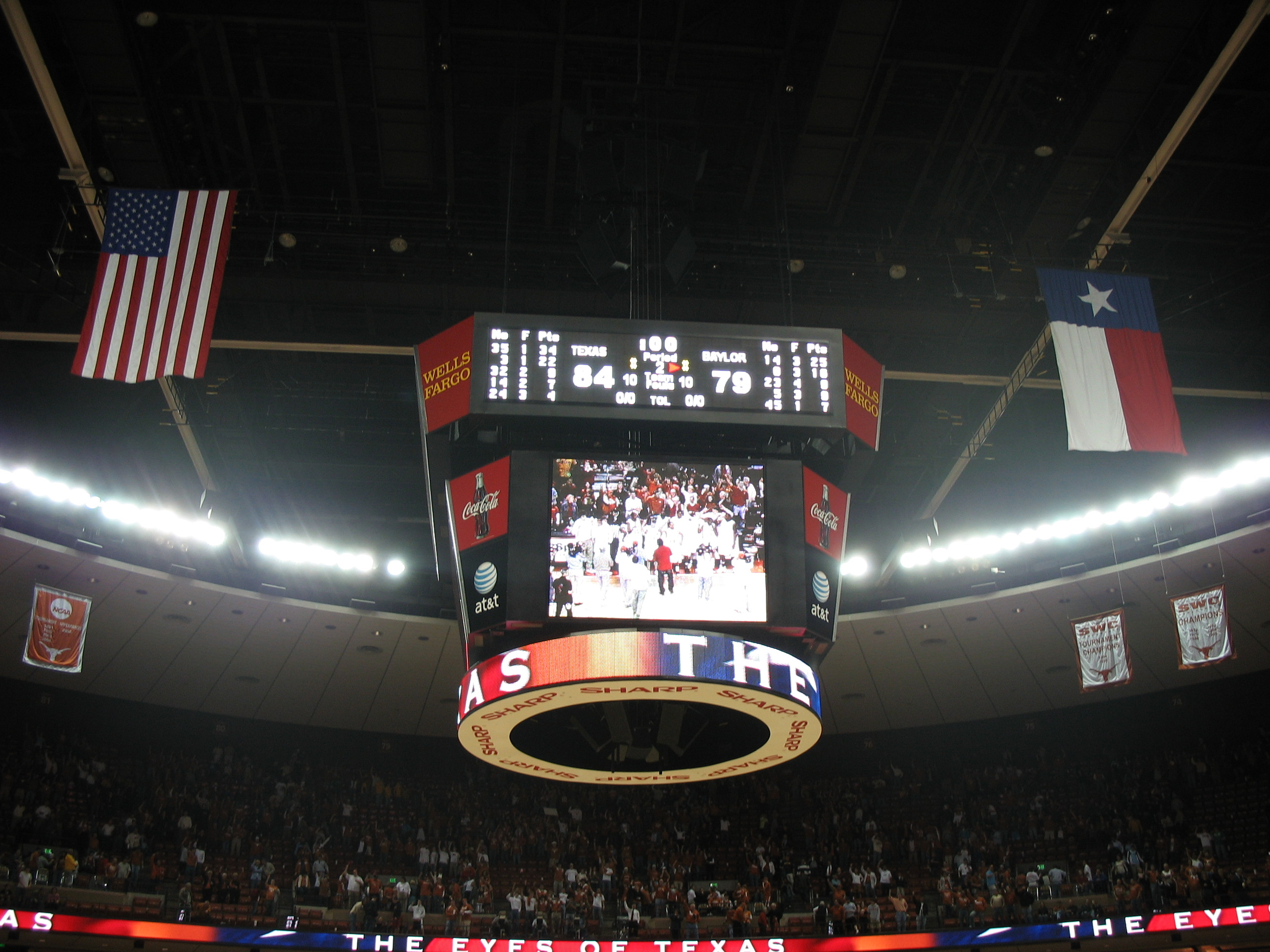
"The Eyes of Texas" at a University of Texas basketball game

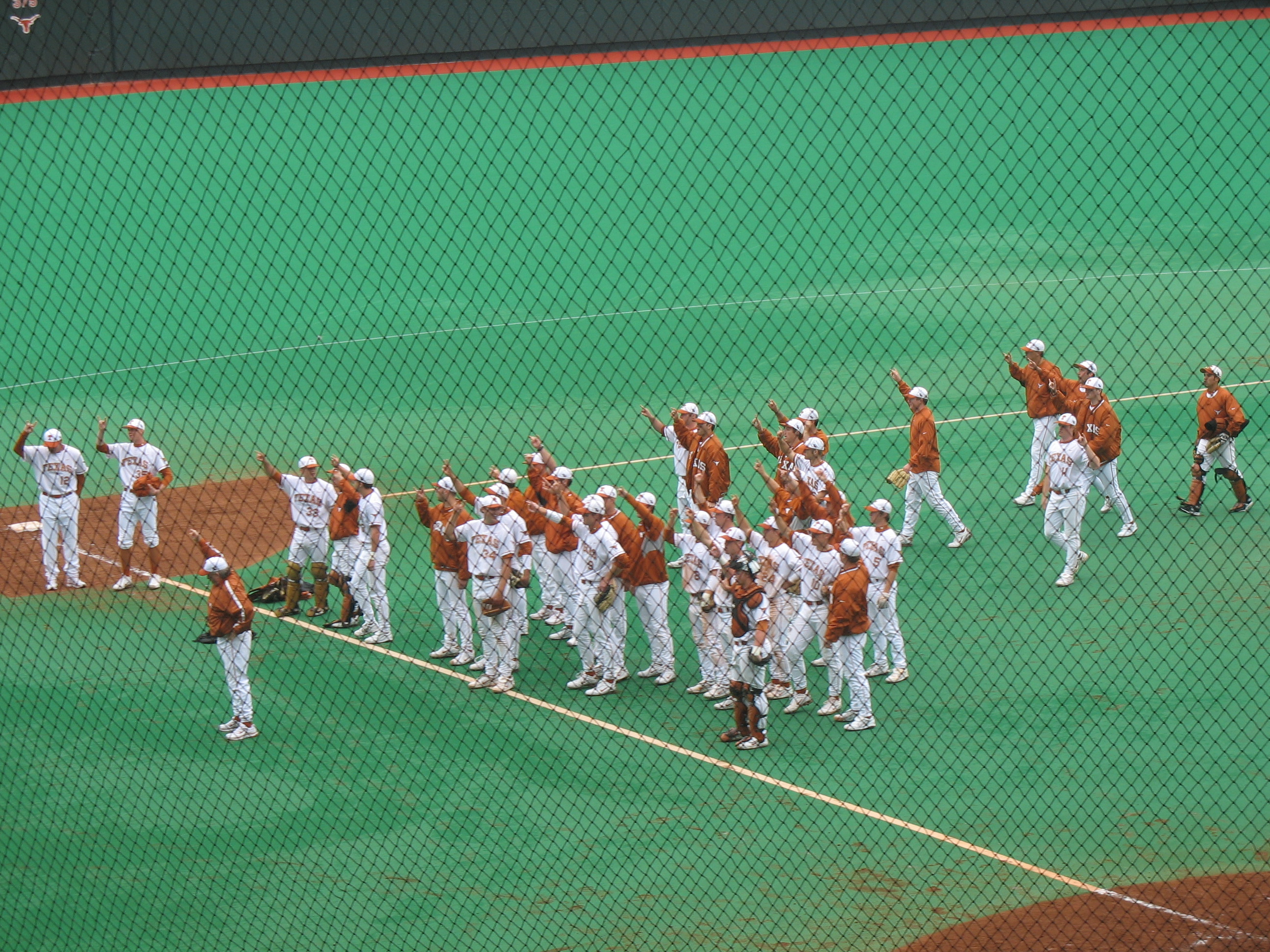
"The Eyes of Texas" after a University of Texas baseball game

John Sinclair wrote the Texas-specific song lyrics in 1903 to the tune of the original folk song "I've Been Working on the Railroad", which was published nine years earlier in 1894. Sinclair was the editor of the Cactus yearbook, a UT band member, and a member of the Glee Club, and he wrote the lyrics per the request of band member Lewis Johnson. Johnson was also the program director of the Varsity Minstrel Show that raised funds for the university track team.

The lyrics are said to be intended to poke fun at university president William Lambdin Prather. At the time, the University of Texas had fewer than a thousand students, and there were weekly convocations of the students at which Prather would often speak. Prather customarily concluded his speeches by saying, "Ladies and gentlemen, the eyes of Texas are upon you," an admonition similar to one Robert E. Lee was said to have used while President of Washington College in Virginia, meaning that the state of Texas was watching and expecting the students to go out and do great things. Prather had attended Washington College (later Washington & Lee University), became a friend of Lee, and served as a pallbearer at Lee's funeral in 1870.

The song made its public debut as the last number at a Glee Club minstrel show, where it was met by the student audience with laughter and applause as a joke on Prather's admonition. Prather too was in attendance, and enjoyed the song and its usage. He died in 1905, and the song was played at his funeral.

The song is sung at momentous occasions such as graduation and even solemn occasions such as funerals. Led by the Longhorn Marching Band, it was sung at the July 14, 2007, funeral of First Lady Lady Bird Johnson, an alumna of the University of Texas. When singing the song, participants generally raise their right arm with their hand making the Hook 'em Horns symbol of the university. A recording of "The Eyes of Texas" was played over the Rose Bowl public-address system when the Dallas Cowboys defeated the Buffalo Bills to win Super Bowl XXVII, while Madison Square Garden organist Ray Castoldi played it when the Houston Rockets defeated the New York Knicks in the seventh game of the 1994 NBA Finals to clinch Texas' first NBA championship.

Highway rest stops through the state feature road signs stating that "The Eyes of Texas are upon You!" These signs feature a silhouette of a Texas Ranger, encouraging motorists to call 9-1-1 to report criminal activity.

"The Eyes of Texas" was once the fight song of the University of Texas at El Paso (UTEP). In 1920, UTEP was known as College of Mines and Metallurgy of the University of Texas (sometimes referred to as "Texas College of Mines", or "TCM"). As a branch of the University of Texas, the song automatically became TCM's fight song. The university replaced it with Marty Robbins's "El Paso" in 1985.

"The Eyes of Texas" is also sung at the graduation of University of Texas Medical Branch (UTMB). UTMB is the first, but not the only, state medical school in Texas.

== Lyrics ==
The lyrics are set to the tune of "I've Been Working on the Railroad". A comparison of the lyrics of that song and "The Eyes of Texas" shows the nature of the parody in the latter:

I've Been Working on the Railroad

I've been working on the railroad,
All the livelong day.
I've been working on the railroad,
Just to pass the time away.
Do you hear the whistle blowing?
Rise up so early in the morn!
Do you hear the captain calling,
"Dinah blow your horn"?

The Eyes of Texas Are Upon You

The Eyes of Texas are upon you,
All the live-long day.
The Eyes of Texas are upon you,
You cannot get away.
Do not think you can escape them,
At night or early in the morn.
The Eyes of Texas are upon you,
'til Gabriel blows his horn.

It is common practice that the last line, "Til Gabriel blows his horn", is sung and played to a slightly slower tempo than the rest of the song. Students, faculty, staff, athletes, and alumni punctuate each beat of the last line with a small chopping motion of their right raised arm and "Hook 'Em" hand sign.

== Usage in popular culture ==
The song was sung each morning by school children in Castro County, Texas at the Hart Elementary and the Dimmett High School every morning before classes after the Pledge of Allegiance. This was as early as 1926 to 1938, according to a student, Joe Erwin Stewart, who attended between those dates.

=== Appearances in film ===
- The song is sung by a group of soldiers in the 1944 film Thirty Seconds Over Tokyo, based on the Doolittle Raid during World War II.
- Roy Rogers starred in a 1948 film titled Eyes of Texas.
- The song is sung in combat by pilot Cowboy Blithe (Don Taylor) in the 1951 film Flying Leathernecks.
- The song is sung throughout by various infantrymen in the 1951 film Go for Broke!.
- The song is played repeatedly in the 1956 movie, Giant, including the final shot with a close-up of the eyes of the two Benedict children, representing the future of Texas.
- The song is included in Dimitri Tiomkin's score for the 1960 film The Alamo, which was nominated for the Academy Awards of Best Music (Original Song) and for Best Music (Scoring of a Dramatic or Comedy Picture) in 1961. The Battle of the Alamo occurred in 1836, 67 years before the song was written.
- Elvis Presley sings it as part of a medley with "The Yellow Rose of Texas" in the 1963 film Viva Las Vegas.
- The song was sung by Capt. Oppo (Sergio Fantoni) and citizens of Valerno in 1966 film What Did You Do in the War, Daddy?.
- In Steven Spielberg's 1974 film The Sugarland Express, as the slow-speed police chase comes into a small town thronged with supporters of the fugitive couple, the marching band is playing "The Eyes of Texas".
- Sung by Roy Orbison and Hank Williams Jr. to calm a rowdy group at a country-western bar in the 1980 film Roadie. Travis Redfish, played by Meat Loaf, sings along.
- Played in the 1983 film The Right Stuff, as background when Project Mercury astronauts arrive at the official party held in their honor in the Houston Astrodome
- It is sung by Gus Lang (Ed Harris) to Andy Wheeler (Eric Stoltz) in the 1985 film Code Name: Emerald.
- Used as background music to the 1965 inaugural ball for President Lyndon Johnson in the opening scene in the 2002 film Path to War
- Used as the theme song for both the radio and television versions of Tales of the Texas Rangers
- Sung by a group of schoolchildren at President John F. Kennedy's breakfast speech in Fort Worth, Texas on the morning of his assassination on November 22, 1963. This clip can be seen in the films Four Days in November, The Men Who Killed Kennedy and, more recently, in The History Channel's 2009 documentary JFK: 3 Shots That Changed America.

=== Other uses ===
- Sung at Texas Bluebonnet Girls State, as part of the flag ceremony medley
- From 1977 to 1982, it was used along with two other songs in the second segment for the Audio-Animatronic, Dolli Dimples, in the original Chuck E Cheese Pizza Time Theatre (now called Chuck E in San Jose, California.
- Brazilian radio station Rádio Bandeirantes uses a modified instrumental version of this song during soccer matches, and a version with altered lyrics as a jingle for the pre and post game programs.

=== Appearances in other songs ===
- The song forms the chorus portion of "VI. Chorale and Finale" from Oedipus Tex and Other Choral Calamities.
- The rock group Masters of Reality uses the title in the lyrics of their song "The Eyes of Texas", on their 1989 self-titled debut album.
- The Aggie War Hymn refers to the song with the lyrics "'The Eyes of Texas are upon you' / That is the song they sing so well", often followed by "Sounds like hell!".
- The opening fanfare of "If You're Gonna Play in Texas (You Gotta Have a Fiddle in the Band)" features Alabama's vocalists – accompanied by just a piano – singing a few bars of "The Eyes of Texas". This introduction leads into the single's opening, which suddenly picks up the tempo to a quick duple-meter.
- The Christmas song "Santa Got Lost In Texas" is based on the melody, with lyrics rewritten by Ken Darby. It was introduced by Michael Landon on the LP Bonanza - Christmas On The Ponderosa in 1963. The Jeff Carson version became a national chart record in early 1996.
- Walker, Texas Ranger uses a rewritten version in the opening credits "the eyes of the Ranger are upon you every wrong you do he's gonna see".

== Controversy ==
The lyrics of the song have been interpreted as embracing the "Lost Cause" ideology, which advocates for the belief that the practice of slavery in the Antebellum South was just and moral. This interpretation was based on a tradition that held that UT President William Prather had adapted the phrase from General Robert E. Lee's purported use of the phrase "The eyes of the South are upon you" to advocate Lost Cause nostalgia. Prather had attended Washington College, now Washington and Lee University, whose president was Robert E. Lee. All of these interpretations predate research from a report that found "no primary source has been found connecting the phrase as something that Lee used" and additionally found no evidence in Washington & Lee University records "that Lee ever closed an address to the students with the phrase". However, a report by UT Austin history professor Alberto Martinez states that President William Prather's use of the phrase was inspired by a line spoken by confederate general Maxcy Gregg about Robert E. Lee. While no primary source "has been found connecting the phrase as something that Lee used", four independent secondary accounts, by both of William Prather's children, T.U. Taylor (who recounted the story multiple times in the decades before his 1938 memoir), and Jim Cannon have all stated that Prather's inspiration for the phrase was General Robert E. Lee. The phrase "The Eyes of Texas" was in use well before the Civil War with regard to Texas itself. In a column entitled "A Campfire Story" in the Highland Messenger of May 26, 1843, a report on early military discipline in Texas shortly after the Battle of San Jacinto, a colonel is said to have addressed his troops, saying "The eyes of Texas, the eyes of her bravest officers, my eyes are upon you."

In June 2020, several players on the University of Texas at Austin football team requested that the university replace the song with one "without racist undertones". In response to the players' request, African-American former University of Texas football players Earl Campbell and Ricky Williams spoke out to keep the song in place as UT's alma mater.

Campbell's comments on "The Eyes of Texas" are as follows:

"I'm proud of that song", ~ "I think there's a lot of things that can be done other than that song in my opinion. I just believe 'The Eyes of Texas' stands for something."

Williams was quoted as saying:

"I think it's important to understand our history and to understand where the song came from, but I think it's more powerful to transform the meaning of the song and the definition of the song rather than trying to erase our history like it never existed"

Following those requests, interim UT president Jay Hartzell announced that the song would remain as the alma mater but that the university would work to "reclaim and redefine" the song by openly acknowledging its history.

In October 2020, the University of Texas band was unable to perform the song at football games, due to a lack of members willing to play it. The athletic department stated that it would play a recorded version of the song prior to sports events.

A March 2021 investigative report by The Texas Tribune published snippets of alumni and donor emails to president Hartzell. In these emails, the alumni and donors demanded that Hartzell take a stronger stance supporting "The Eyes of Texas" and threatened to cancel their financial contributions. In a statement, Hartzell apologized for the "abhorrent and hateful" emails from some of the alumni. A March 2021 report titled "The Eyes of Texas History Committee Report" confirmed the song's minstrel show "debuted in a racist setting, exceedingly common for the time", but found no racist intent.

The university announced in April 2021 that by 2022 there would be a new separate band for students who didn't want to play "The Eyes of Texas". However, this announcement was met with pushback, as opponents argued that forcing students into a different band was an attempt to create a "separate but equal" alternative that violated constitutional equal protection standards.

On September 3, 2021, the Texas chapter of the NAACP filed a complaint with the U.S. Department of Education against the University of Texas for its continued use of the school song. The federal civil rights complaint alleged that "Black students, athletes, band members, faculty and alumni [were] being subjected to violations of the Civil Rights Act and a hostile campus environment over the 'offensive', 'disrespectful' and 'aggressive' use of the song".

== Notes ==
1. "It's a Century Later, and the Eyes of Texas are Still Upon You" Support UT news story from March 2003 concerning the centennial of The Eyes of Texas
2. Film review of "Giant" - Accessed 20 March 2006
3. The Alamo – Accessed 20 March 2006
4. "The Eyes of Texas Are Upon Excellence Award Winners"
5. P.D.Q. Bach. "VI. Chorus and Finale". Oedipus Tex and Other Choral Calamities. CD. Telarc CD-80239, 1990.
