= William Lambdin Prather =

American academic administrator (1848–1905)

3rd President of the University of Texas at Austin
- In office 1899–1905
- Preceded by: George T. Winston
- Succeeded by: David F. Houston

Personal details
- Born: May 1, 1848 Near Paris, Tennessee, U.S.
- Died: July 24, 1905 (aged 57) Austin, Texas, U.S.
- Spouse: Frances H. Kirkpatrick (m. 1875)
- Children: 5
- Education: Washington and Lee University (LL.B.)
- Occupation: Lawyer, academic administrator

William Lambdin Prather (May 1, 1848 – July 24, 1905) was an American lawyer. He served as the third president of the University of Texas at Austin and as a member of the university's board of regents.

Prather was born near Paris, Tennessee, in 1848, and moved to Texas with his family in 1854. He attended Washington and Lee University from 1867 to 1871, earning a Bachelor of Laws degree. He studied under Robert E. Lee during his time there and was a pallbearer at Lee's funeral in 1870. Prather was admitted to the bar in 1871 and practiced law in Waco, Texas, until 1899, serving as the city attorney from 1875 to 1878 and as the president of the state bar association from 1895 to 1896.

In 1887, Prather was appointed as a regent of the University of Texas. He became vice chairman of the board of regents in 1895 and chairman in 1899. That same year, he was named as the university's third president and its first president from Texas; he held the position until his death. While president, he served terms as vice president of the National Educational Association and vice president of the National Association of State Universities. Prather introduced the phrase "the eyes of Texas are upon you" when speaking to students, an expression that was once credited to a similar expression by Lee but now believed to be inspired by a quote from Confederate general John Gregg. The words were incorporated into the school's song, "The Eyes of Texas", in 1903.

Prather married Frances H. Kirkpatrick in 1875; they had two sons and three daughters. He received honorary law degrees from Washington and Lee in 1900 and from the University of Pennsylvania in 1901. He died in Austin, Texas, in 1905 from heart disease.
