= Carl Tolman =

11th Chancellor of Washington University in St. Louis
- In office 1961–1962
- Preceded by: Ethan A.H. Shepley
- Succeeded by: Thomas H. Eliot

Personal details
- Born: May 7, 1897 Lacombe, Alberta
- Died: February 13, 1995 (aged 97) Kirkwood, Missouri
- Education: University of British Columbia

Carl Tolman (May 7, 1897 – February 13, 1995) was the chancellor of Washington University in St. Louis from 1961 through 1962.

== Early years ==
Carl Tolman was born in the Northwest Territories in Canada to American Parents. He served in the Canadian Expeditionary Force in World War I and was captured by German forces in 1917. After the war, he earned a bachelor's degree in geology from the University of British Columbia and his master's degree and Ph.D. from Yale.

== Washington University ==
Tolman joined the faculty of Washington University in St. Louis in 1927 as an assistant professor of geology. He remained associated with the University for 68 years, eventually serving as chancellor after the retirement of Ethan A.H. Shepley.
