= Henry Cantwell Wallace =

American politician (1866–1924)

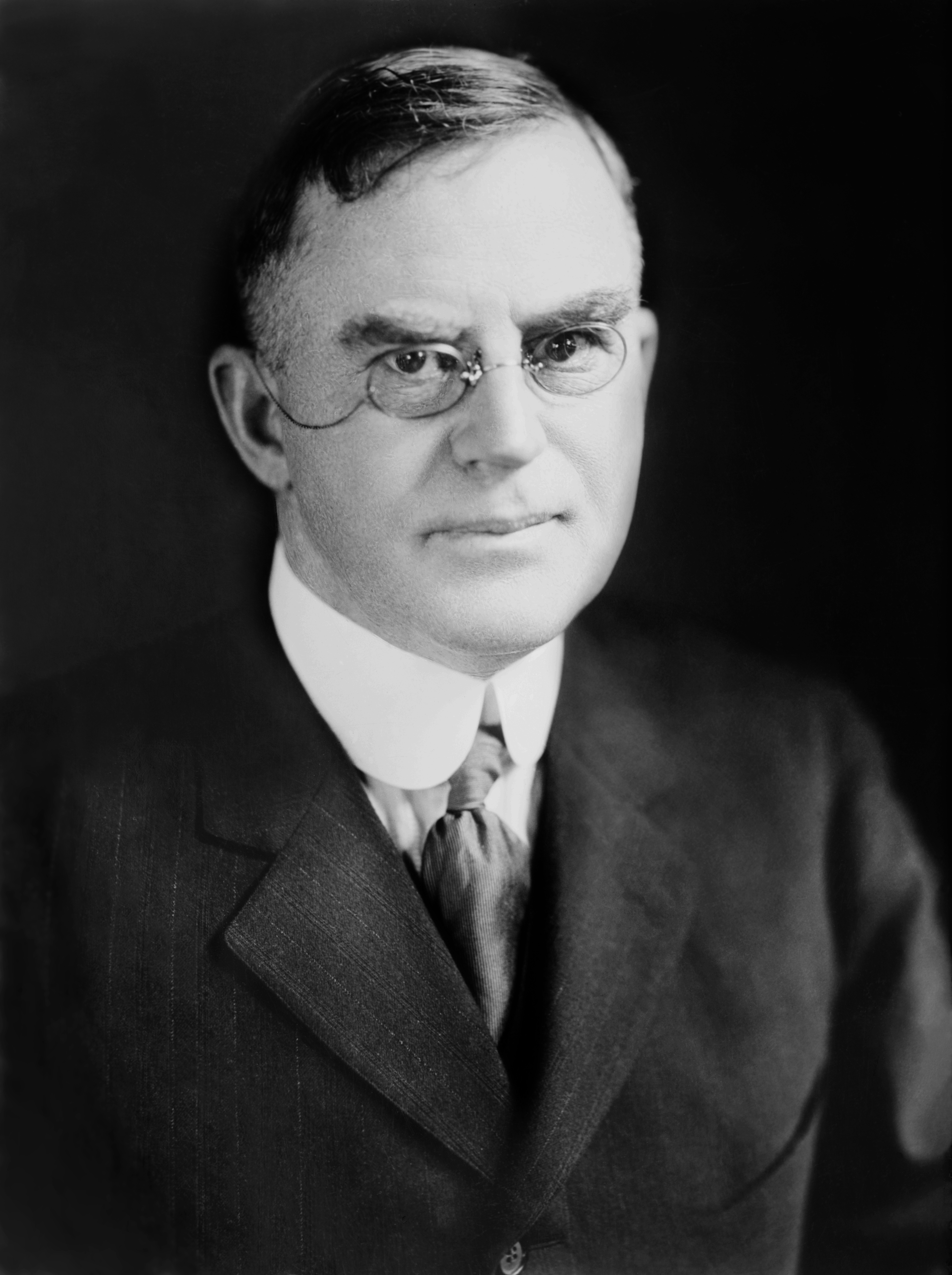

7th United States Secretary of Agriculture
- In office March 5, 1921 – October 25, 1924
- President: Warren G. Harding; Calvin Coolidge
- Preceded by: Edwin T. Meredith
- Succeeded by: Howard Gore

Personal details
- Born: Henry Cantwell Wallace; May 11, 1866 Rock Island, Illinois, U.S.
- Died: October 25, 1924 (aged 58) Washington, D.C., U.S.
- Party: Republican
- Spouse: Carrie May Brodhead (m. 1887)
- Children: 6, including Henry
- Relatives: Peter R. Wallace (great-grandson)
- Education: Iowa State University (BS)

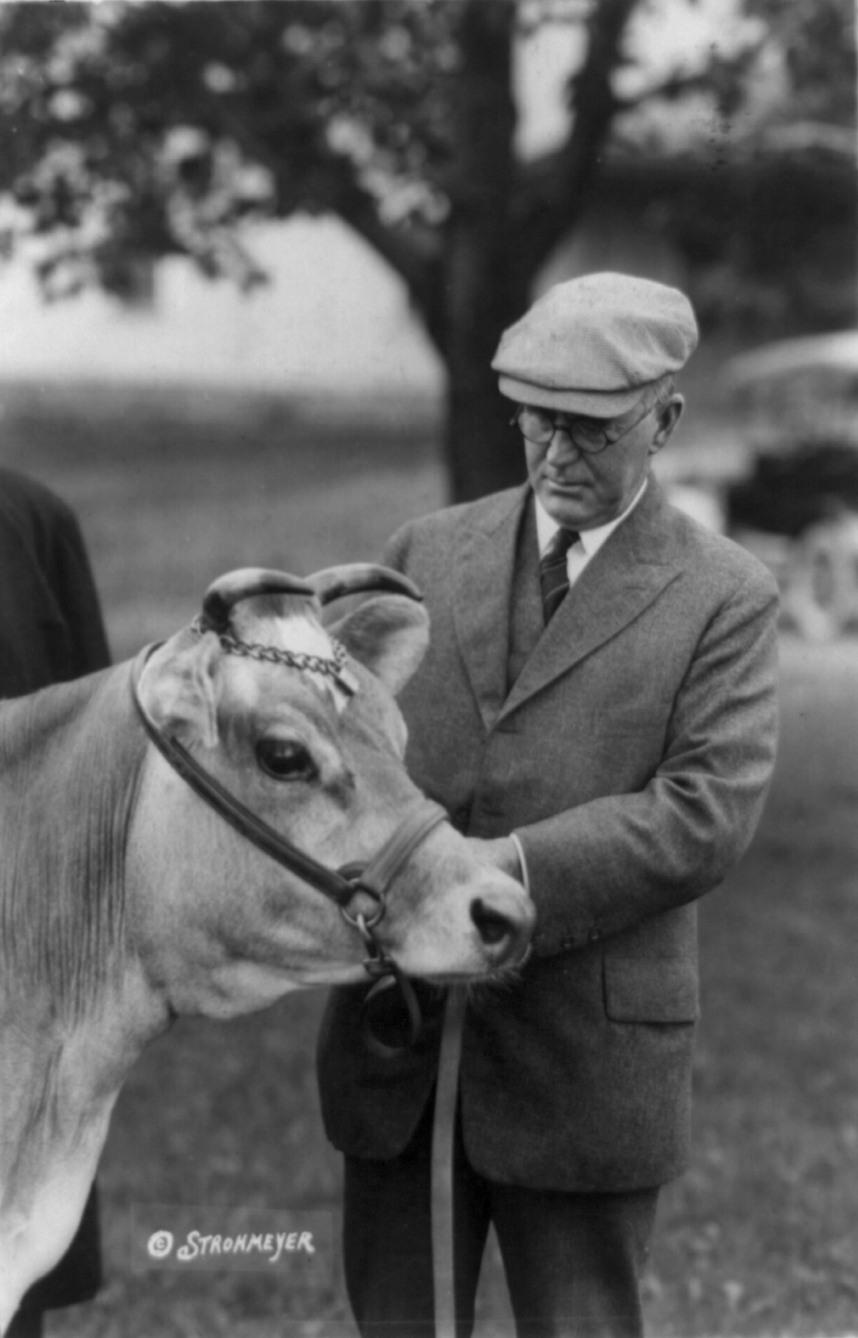
Wallace tending to a cow, c. 1922

Henry Cantwell Wallace (May 11, 1866 – October 25, 1924) was an American farmer, journalist, and political activist who served as the secretary of agriculture from 1921 to 1924 under Republican presidents Warren G. Harding and Calvin Coolidge. He was the father of Henry A. Wallace, who followed in his father's footsteps as secretary of agriculture and later became vice president under Democratic President Franklin D. Roosevelt. He was an editor of Wallaces' Farmer from 1916 to 1921.

== Early years ==
Born May 11, 1866, in Rock Island, Illinois, Wallace was the first child and son of Henry Wallace and Nancy "Nannie" (née Cantwell) Wallace. John Wallace, father of the elder Henry, was an Ulster Scots immigrant from the village Kilrea in County Londonderry, Ireland, who arrived in Philadelphia in 1823 and later owned a farm in western Pennsylvania, which the elder Henry worked on as a child with his seven siblings. The elder Henry moved west at 18 and became a Presbyterian minister. He married Nancy Cantwell, the daughter of an Ohio politician, in 1863.

The elder Henry moved the family to Winterset, Iowa, in 1877 on a doctor's recommendation. The family managed farm lands in Adair County, and his health improved significantly. He then entered the local newspaper business; he bought the Winterset Chronicle and the Madisonian, and wrote for both from a Republican perspective. The younger Henry worked as his father's apprentice in the newspaper business. In 1883, the elder Henry was named editor of The Iowa Homestead, the largest farming publication in Iowa, and moved to Des Moines to be closer to his work.

However, The Iowa Homestead was acquired by James Pierce in 1885. In 1895, the elder Henry disagreed with Pierce, and left to join The Farm and Dairy, an agricultural paper operated by his sons. By 1898, this paper had been renamed Wallaces' Farmer. (The Homestead and Farmer were bitter rivals for many years; in 1929 the Wallaces bought the Homestead. In 1932, due to the Depression, the Farmer went bankrupt, and was acquired by Dante Pierce (son of James.) It is now owned by Penton Media.)

== Iowa State Agricultural College ==
Henry left Winterset in 1885 to attend Iowa State Agricultural College, now Iowa State University; he left the college in 1887 and later said "very little agriculture was taught [at the school]". He married Carrie May Brodhead, whom he met at the college, on November 27, 1887. The two returned to Adair County to become tenant farmers on his father's land. The couple had two children while they lived on the farm: Henry Agard was born on October 7, 1888, and Annabelle Wallace was born on November 8, 1891. They eventually had six children together.

In 1893, Wallace returned to Iowa State University to complete his degree and take on a teaching position as an assistant professor of dairying. He handled many of the daily details at Wallaces' Farmer and became editor when his father died. He also helped establish 4-H clubs and extension programs in Iowa, and helped start the Iowa Farm Bureau.

== Political career ==
Wallace served as the longtime president of the Cornbelt Meat Producers Association. He was appointed secretary of agriculture by president Warren G. Harding in 1921. Wallace promoted programs for American farmers struggling against over-production and the collapse of farm prices after World War I ended.

Wallace continued to serve as secretary of agriculture after President Harding died in August 1923 and was succeeded by vice president Calvin Coolidge.

During his tenure as secretary, the department established the Bureau of Agriculture Economics and the Bureau of Home Economics.

== Death and legacy ==
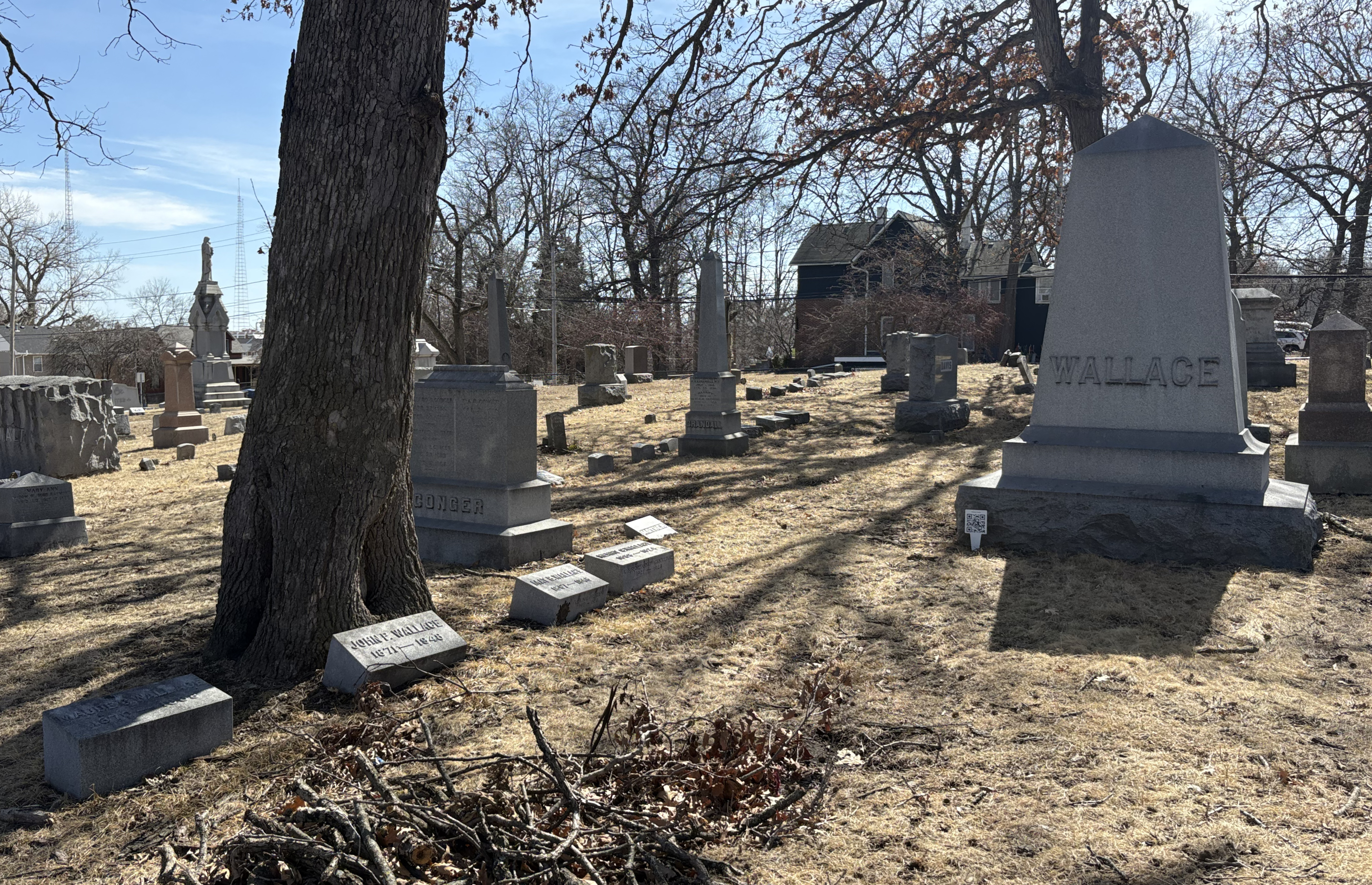
Wallace's grave at Woodland Cemetery

Wallace died of surgical complications on October 25, 1924 after getting gall bladder surgery, just 10 days before the elections. He was 58 years old at the time of his death. Wallace was buried in Woodland Cemetery in Des Moines, Iowa.

His son, Henry A. Wallace, went on to become secretary of agriculture, vice president, and secretary of commerce.

Wallace's book, Our Debt and Duty to the Farmer, was published posthumously.

Political offices
Preceded by Edwin Meredith	U.S. Secretary of Agriculture; Served under: Warren G. Harding, Calvin Coolidge; 1921–1924	Succeeded by Howard Mason Gore
