= 1964 Missouri gubernatorial election =

- November 3, 1964
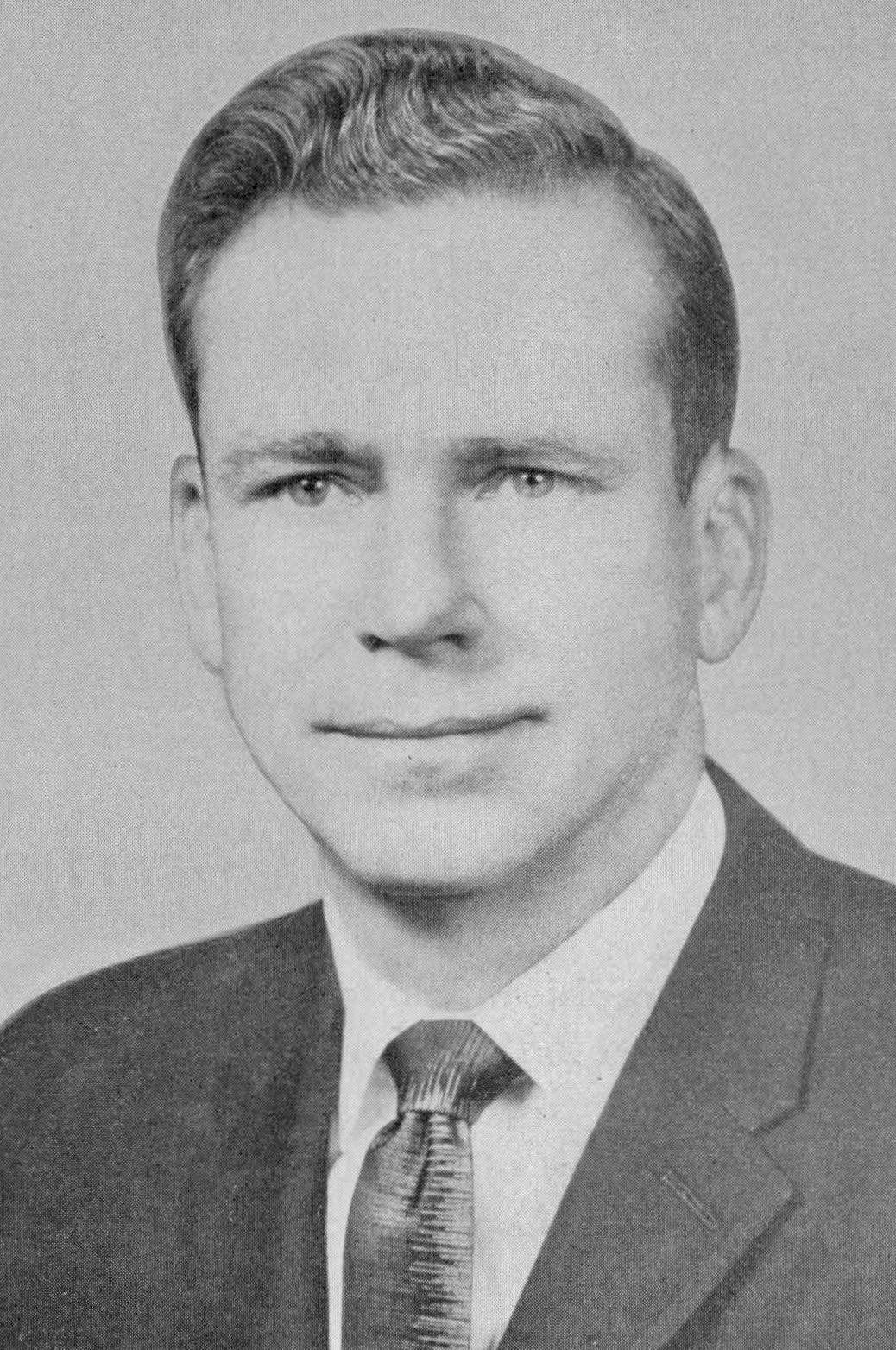

Nominee	Warren E. Hearnes	Ethan A.H. Shepley
Party	Democratic	Republican
Popular vote	1,110,651	678,949
Percentage	62.06%	37.94%
- County results Hearnes: 50–60% 60–70% 70–80% 80–90% Shepley: 50–60% 60–70%
Governor before election
John M. Dalton
Democratic
Elected Governor
Warren E. Hearnes
Democratic

The 1964 Missouri gubernatorial election was held on November 3, 1964, and resulted in a victory for the Democratic nominee, Missouri Secretary of State Warren E. Hearnes, over the Republican candidate, Ethan A.H. Shepley.

== Results ==
1964 gubernatorial election, Missouri
Party	Candidate	Votes	%	±%
Democratic	Warren E. Hearnes	1,110,651	62.06	+4.03
Republican	Ethan A.H. Shepley	678,949	37.94	−4.03
Majority		431,702	24.12	+8.06
Turnout		1,789,600	41.43	−2.26
Democratic hold		Swing		
