= Ethan A.H. Shepley =

American educator (1896–1975)

Ethan A. H. Shepley
- Born: Ethan Allen Hitchcock Shepley; May 3, 1896; St. Louis, Missouri, U.S.
- Died: June 21, 1975 (aged 79); St. Louis, Missouri, U.S.
- Education: Yale University; Harvard Law School; Washington University in St. Louis
- Occupations: Educator; lawyer; politician
- Title: Chancellor of Washington University in St. Louis
- Term: 1954–1961
- Predecessor: Arthur Compton
- Successor: Carl Tolman
- Political party: Republican
- Spouse: Sophie Baker
- Children: 4

Ethan Allen Hitchcock Shepley (May 3, 1896 – June 21, 1975) was the chancellor of Washington University in St. Louis from 1953 until 1961.

== Early life ==
Ethan Allen Hitchcock Shepley was born on May 3, 1896, in Vandeventer, St. Louis, Missouri, to Sarah (née Hitchcock) and John Foster Shepley. Through his mother, he was a descendant of early American revolutionary Ethan Allen. His father and grandfather were both graduates of Washington University in St. Louis. Shepley was educated at Smith Academy in St. Louis and attended a private school in Pennsylvania. He earned his undergraduate degree at Yale University and entered Harvard Law School. He was admitted to the bar in 1921 and finished his law degree at Washington University in St. Louis in 1922.

== Career ==
=== Law and political career ===
From 1921 to 1954, Shepley practiced law in St. Louis. In 1921, he joined the law firm Nagel & Kirby in St. Louis. In 1930, he first became president of the community chest drive and served in that position four different times. He got involved in politics and was delegate-at-large at the 1943–1944 constitutional convention. He was chairman of the committee on taxation at the convention and was involved in writing the Constitution of Missouri. From 1948 to 1949, he was Missouri State Republican Finance Chairman and was a member of the Republican National Finance Committee. In 1953, Shepley was one of five founding members of Civic Progress Inc.

=== Washington University ===
From 1940 to 1954, Shepley was a member of Washington University's board of directors. He was elected as chairman of the board in 1951. Following the resignation of Arthur Compton, he served as temporary chancellor of the university. He became chancellor in 1954 and was the first alumnus to hold the position. He oversaw the transition of the university from a "streetcar college" for local students to a national university with a majority of its students from outside the region. During his tenure, the dormitories were desegregated. A three-year, US$20,000,000 fundraising drive called the "Second Century Campaign" started in February 1955 and led to a new round of construction, including the John M. Olin Library, Urbauer Hall for engineering, Busch Laboratory for biology, and Steinberg Hall for the Gallery of Arts, as well as dormitories on Wydown Boulevard. He retired in June 1961, but remained active with the university, including serving as chairman of the board and chairman of the "Seventy by 'Seventy'" fundraising campaign.

=== Later career ===
In 1964, Shepley was the Republican candidate for Missouri governor, but lost to Warren E. Hearnes. After his retirement, he maintained law offices at Bryan, Cave, McPheeters & McRoberts on Broadway. He was also director of Anheuser-Busch and Mallinckrodt.

Shepley expressed support for younger generations protesting materialistic wealth in the 1960s.

== Personal life ==
Shepley married Sophie Baker. They had two sons and two daughters, Ethan A. H. Jr., Lewis B., Mrs. William G. Moore Jr. and Mrs. Jack E. Pelissier. He enjoyed reading historical novels.

Shepley died of cancer on June 21, 1975, at Barnes-Jewish Hospital in St. Louis. He was cremated.

== Awards ==
Shepley received the Alexander Meiklejohn Award for Academic Freedom from the American Association of University Professors in 1959. This followed Shepley's defense of gynecologist William Masters in 1954 for his research on sexual function.

Party political offices
Preceded by Edward G. Farmer	Republican nominee for Governor of Missouri; 1964	Succeeded by Lawrence K. Roos
