= Professional Remodeler =

- Type: Business magazine
- Format: Paper and online magazine
- Owner: SGC Horizon
- Founded: 1997
- Language: English
- Headquarters: Arlington Heights, Illinois, USA
- Circulation: 83,000
- ISSN: 1521-9135
- Website: Professional Remodeler

Professional Remodeler (ISSN 1521-9135) is a trade publication and website serving the information needs of residential, commercial, and general remodeling contractors.

== History and profile ==
Established in 1997, Professional Remodeler magazine is published monthly. The magazine focuses on delivering business management information to professional remodelers that have been in business for at least three years and have more than $500,000 in annual volume.

As of June 2011, total BPA circulation was 83,000 subscribers.

In May 2010, former owner Reed Business Information sold the magazine to MB Media. On July 8, 2010, MB Media announced a strategic partnership with Scranton Gillette Communications, SGC Horizon, to resume publication of the magazine. The magazine relaunched with its September 2010 issue.

Tim Gregorski served as the editor in chief. In late 2014 Erika Taylor was named its editor-in-chief.

== Past PR Remodeler of the Year winners ==
2012 Lindus Construction Baldwin, Wisc.

2011 Anthony Home Improvements Elkins Park, Pa.

2010 Marrokal Remodeling, San Diego, CA
2009 Case Design/Remodeling, Bethesda, MD
2008 Neil Kelly Co., Portland, OR
2007 Normandy Builders, Hinsdale, IL
2006 BOWA Builders, McLean, VA
2005 Alure Home Improvement, Plainview, NY
2004 Creative Contracting, North Wales, PA
2003 DreamMaker Bath & Kitchen, Waco, TX
2002 Legacy Custom Builders, Scottsdale, AZ
2001 McGuire Hearn & Toms, Manakin-Sabot, VA
2000 Medina Construction Co., Salina, KS
