= Frederic Aldin Hall =

Frederic Aldin Hall (1854–1925) served as chancellor of Washington University in St. Louis from 1913 until 1923.

== Early years ==
Hall was born in Brunswick, Maine in 1854. He graduated from Drury College in Springfield, Missouri.

== Washington University ==
Hall joined Washington University in 1901 as Professor of Greek. He became dean of the College in 1913 and a year later was named acting chancellor when Chancellor Houston was named United States Secretary of Agriculture. During his tenure, Hall established the School of Graduate Studies and the School of Commerce and Finance.
