= Marshall Snow =

Marshall Solomon Snow (August 17, 1842 in Hyannis, Massachusetts – May 28, 1916 in Taunton, Massachusetts) was a United States educator and historian. He was acting chancellor of Washington University in St. Louis from 1887 until 1891, and again from 1907 to 1908.

== Biography ==
He attended Phillips Exeter Academy with classmate Robert Todd Lincoln. He graduated from Harvard University in 1865. He worked at high schools in Worcester, Massachusetts, (1865/6) and Nashville, Tennessee, (1866/67). In 1867, he was appointed professor of mathematics at the University of Nashville, but that year he accepted a position as professor of belles lettres at Washington University. During his career at Washington University, he was professor of belles lettres until 1870, when he became professor of history. He was registrar from 1870 to 1877, when he became dean of the college faculty. He was acting chancellor from 1887 to 1891 and in 1907/8.

He was a member of the Missouri Historical Society, of which he became president in 1894; he was also a member of the American Historical Association, and numerous other historical societies.

== Personal ==
He was a member of the Episcopal Church. In 1867, he married Ellen Frances Jewell of Exeter, New Hampshire. His remains were interred in Exeter.

== Works ==
- "Missouri" . Encyclopædia Britannica. Vol. 16 (9th ed.). 1883.
- Higher Education in Missouri. U.S. Government Printing Office. 1898.
