= Clyde L. Herring =

American politician (1879-1945)

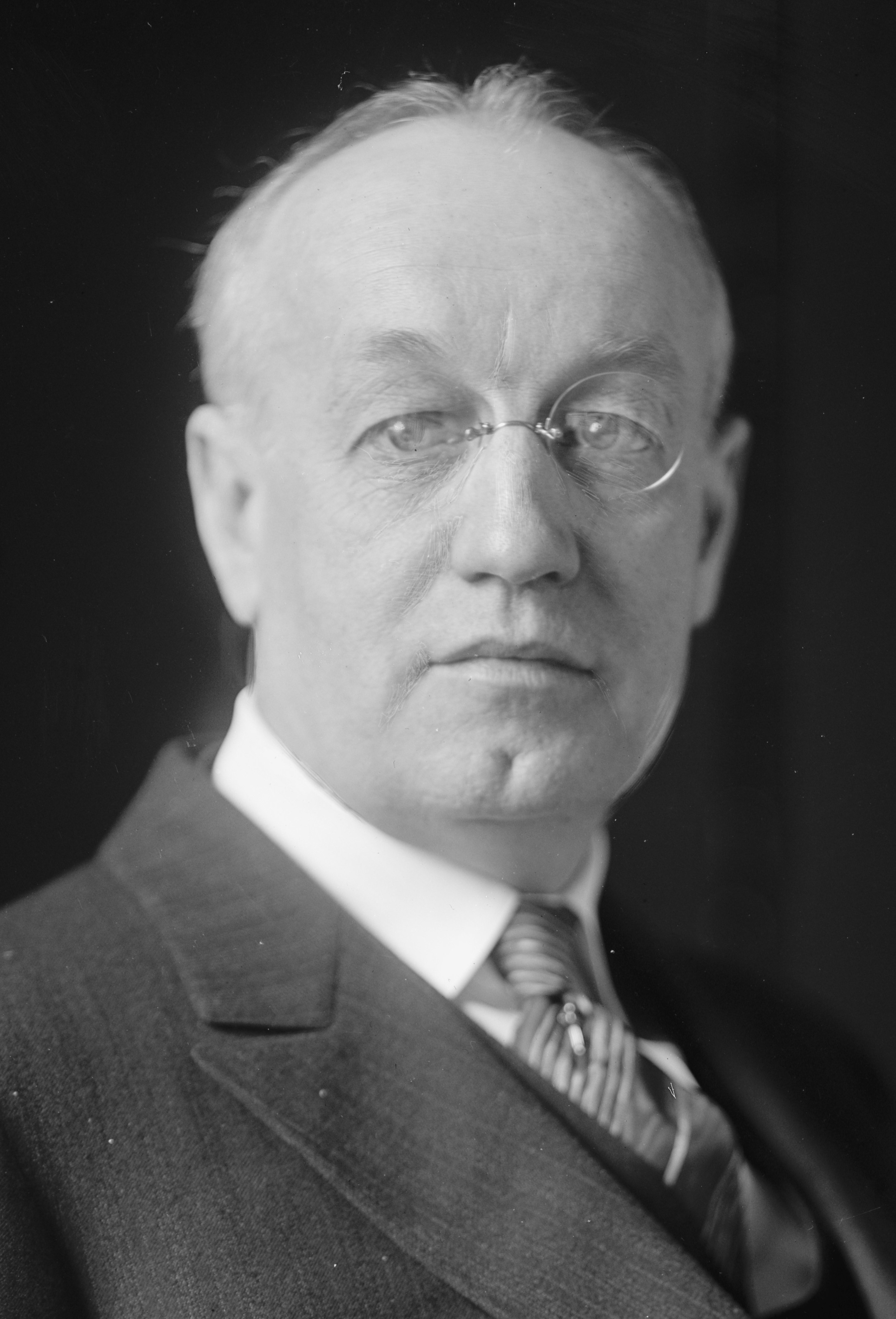

United States Senator from Iowa
- In office January 15, 1937 – January 3, 1943
- Preceded by: Lester J. Dickinson
- Succeeded by: George A. Wilson

26th Governor of Iowa
- In office January 12, 1933 – January 14, 1937
- Lieutenant: Nelson G. Kraschel
- Preceded by: Daniel W. Turner
- Succeeded by: Nelson G. Kraschel

Personal details
- Born: Clyde LaVerne Herring; May 3, 1879 Jackson, Michigan, US
- Died: September 15, 1945 (aged 66) Washington, D.C., US
- Party: Democratic
- Spouse: Pearl S. Herring
- Children: 3

Military service
- Allegiance: United States
- Branch/service: Michigan National Guard; Iowa National Guard
- Years of service: 1898-1918
- Rank: Private
- Unit: 3rd Michigan Regiment, Company D
- Battles/wars: Spanish-American War; World War I

Clyde LaVerne Herring (May 3, 1879 – September 15, 1945) was an American Democratic politician who served as the 26th governor of Iowa, and then one of its U.S. senators, during the last part of the Great Depression and the first part of World War II.

== Early life ==
He was born in 1879 and raised in Jackson County, Michigan. His parents farmed until he was 14 years old, when the Panic of 1893 caused failing finances that made it necessary for them to move to town.

== Early career ==
In 1897, at 18, he moved to Detroit, Michigan, and became a jewelry clerk.

Enlisting in the military, he served during the Spanish–American War as a private in Company D of the Third Michigan Regiment.

After the war, he moved to Colorado Springs, Colorado, where he engaged in ranching from 1902 to 1906. He then moved to Massena, Iowa, where he farmed for two years (1906–1908).

As Time magazine would recount in a 1935 cover story featuring him, "in Detroit he had fixed Henry Ford's watch, thus came to know that rising automobile manufacturer. From 1910 until the distributing system was reshuffled after the War, Clyde Herring was Ford agent for Iowa. By that time he had acquired $3,000,000 worth of Des Moines real estate."

In 1916–17, he served with the Iowa National Guard on the Mexican border. Returning to civilian life in Des Moines, as America entered the First World War, Herring led local fundraising efforts as the chair of the Greater Des Moines Committee, and he was invited to Washington to advise the federal government on speeding up production of war supplies.

== Political career ==
Herring was the unsuccessful Democratic nominee for governor of Iowa in 1920, losing to Republican Nathan E. Kendall. He then ran for the United States Senate in a 1922 special election, caused by the elevation of Senator William S. Kenyon to be a Judge of the United States Court of Appeals for the Eighth Circuit, losing to Republican Smith W. Brookhart. He held one of Iowa's seats on the Democratic National Committee from 1924 to 1928.

=== Governor of Iowa ===
In 1932, Herring ran again for governor of Iowa, now against incumbent Republican Dan Turner, defeating him by 53,428 votes. Herring and other Democratic candidates in Iowa won an unprecedented number of races that year, and Herring became only the second Democrat to serve as governor of Iowa since the founding of the Republican Party, in 1854. In a 1934 rematch, Herring again defeated Turner this time by 74,287 votes, while he led a Democratic sweep of statewide offices that also kept Democrats in six of Iowa's nine U.S. House seats. Notable accomplishments from Herring’s two terms in office were a budget as well as financial control act that would manage and condense state expenses, halted foreclosures, and a bill that aided financially unstable banks.

=== United States Senator ===
In 1936, his fourth year as governor, Herring chose not to run for re-election but instead challenged incumbent Republican U.S. Senator L. J. Dickinson. Herring defeated Dickinson by 35,920 votes. Both senators from Iowa were Democrats for the first time since 1855. His service as senator was slightly delayed to await the end of his term as Iowa's governor.

Herring's reaction to Orson Welles' 1938 "War of the Worlds" broadcast received national attention. To protect listeners, he urged adoption of federal legislation "inducing" broadcasters to first submit radio programming to the Federal Communications Commission before it could be aired. He declared that "radio has no more right to present programs like that than someone has to come knocking on our door and screaming." However, neither he nor anyone else presented a bill, and no such legislation was adopted.

At the 1940 Democratic National Convention in Chicago, Herring aspired to be picked as Franklin D. Roosevelt's vice-presidential candidate, but Roosevelt and the convention instead nominated fellow Iowan Henry A. Wallace, who had served as Roosevelt's Secretary of Agriculture.

Herring served only a single term as senator and failed in his first re-election bid. Roosevelt's popularity in Iowa had waned after 1936, and Democratic candidates increasingly lost re-election. In addition, disagreements or rivalries between Herring and other leading Iowa Democrats, including fellow Senator Guy M. Gillette, former governor Nelson G. Kraschel, and Vice-president Henry Wallace, hampered party unity. Herring lost to Iowa's Republican governor, George A. Wilson by 115,189 votes. Herring was the last of the successful 1932 Democratic candidates in Iowa to lose a re-election bid.

== Later life ==
After serving in the Senate, he returned to the automobile business and was named by Roosevelt as the assistant administrator of the Office of Price Administration, the wartime price regulatory agency.

Herring died in Washington, D.C., on September 15, 1945.

His son, Clyde E. Herring, ran and lost his race for Governor in 1954.

Party political offices
Preceded by Claude R. Porter	Democratic nominee for Governor of Iowa; 1920	Succeeded by J. R. Files
Preceded by Charles Rollin Keyes	Democratic nominee for U.S. senator from Iowa (Class 2); 1922	Succeeded by Daniel F. Steck
Preceded by Fred P. Hagemann	Democratic nominee for Governor of Iowa; 1932, 1934	Succeeded by Nelson G. Kraschel
Preceded by Daniel F. Steck	Democratic nominee for U.S. senator from Iowa (Class 2); 1936, 1942	Succeeded by Guy Gillette
Political offices
Preceded by Daniel Webster Turner	Governor of Iowa; January 12, 1933 – January 14, 1937	Succeeded by Nelson G. Kraschel
U.S. Senate
Preceded by Lester J. Dickinson	U.S. senator (Class 2) from Iowa; 1937–1943; Served alongside: Guy Mark Gillette	Succeeded by George Allison Wilson
