= Dan W. Turner =

American politician (1877-1969)

Daniel Webster Turner
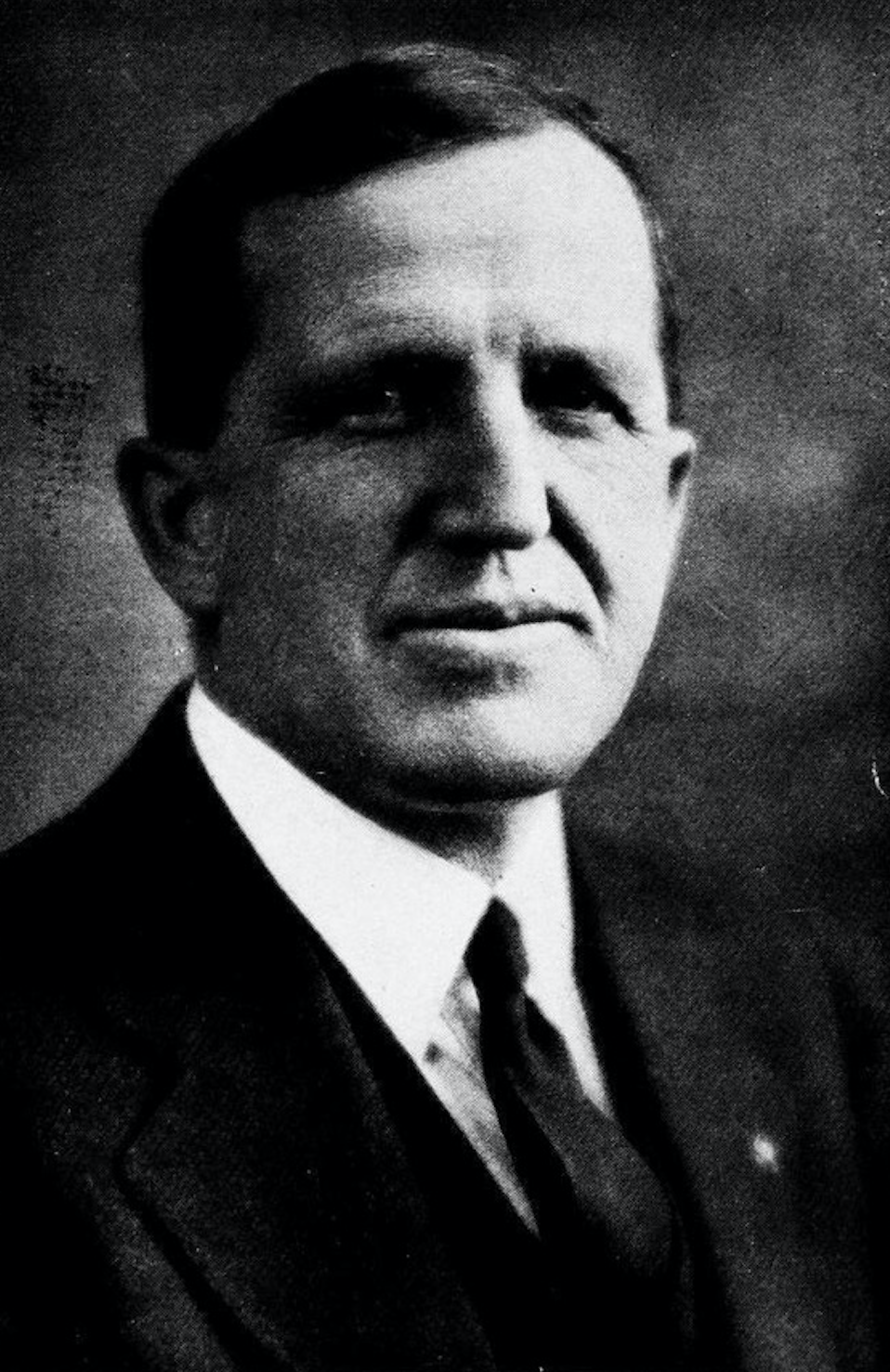

Member of the War Production Board
- In office 1942–1945

25th Governor of Iowa
- In office January 15, 1931 – January 12, 1933
- Lieutenant: Arch W. McFarlane
- Preceded by: John Hammill
- Succeeded by: Clyde L. Herring

Member of the Iowa Senate
- In office January 11, 1904 – January 10, 1909

Personal details
- Born: March 17, 1877 Corning, Iowa, U.S.
- Died: April 15, 1969 (aged 92) Corning, Iowa, U.S.
- Party: Republican
- Spouse: Alice Sample (m. 1900; died 1961)
- Relations: Glen Phillips (great-great nephew); Francis A. Turner (nephew)
- Children: 3

Military service
- Allegiance: United States
- Branch/service: United States Army; Iowa National Guard
- Years of service: May 30, 1898-November 2, 1899 (US Army); 1899-1911 (Iowa National Guard Reserves)
- Rank: Major
- Unit: 51st Iowa Volunteer Infantry Regiment, Company K
- Battles/wars: Spanish-American War; Philippine–American War

Daniel Webster Turner (March 17, 1877 – April 15, 1969) was an American Republican politician who served as the 25th governor of Iowa from 1931 until 1933.

== Early life ==
Daniel Webster Turner, named after the famed antebellum senator and orator, was born on a farm near Corning, Iowa, 5th of 9 children of Austin Bates Turner, a civil war veteran, and Almira (Baker) Turner. As a boy, he did farm chores and clerked at the general store owned by his father. Graduating from the Corning Academy in 1898, he enlisted in the Army and served in the Philippines during the Spanish–American War. He boxed in the division championship fights and won, but suffered a broken nose that became a permanent facial feature. Returning from the war, he joined the National Guard and rose to the rank of major, before resigning in 1911.

He married Alice Sample on September 27, 1900. Alice died in 1961. They had 3 children. One son, Major Ned Turner, died in China during World War II, another son, Thomas was a professor at the University of Iowa School of Music.

== Political career ==
In 1904, he was elected to the Iowa Senate. His political activism and boxer's nose led the press to dub him, “Fighting Dan Turner.”

As a representative of the progressive wing of the Republican Party during the era of “prairie populism,” when the Midwest was a font of radicalism, Turner advocated for many reforms. In a 1912 address to the Republican State Convention, he defended the anti-trust law and called for direct election of U. S. senators, income and corporate taxes as more equitable than property taxes, and an end to corrupt leadership, saying, “We must cleanse our party of complacent plutocrats and corpulent freebooters, masquerading as Republicans.” Elected to the Governorship in 1931, he attacked lobbyists in his inaugural address and demanded fair congressional districts, measures to promote child welfare, and establishing a state conservation commission:

“The professional lobbyist . . . should be ejected from the presence of honest men . . . . He is not interested in the well being of the people we represent.”

“Our streams are rapidly degenerating into open sewers, receiving the waste drainage of private industry and municipalities. We must terminate this practice.”

In a prelude to the Great Depression, the farming economy collapsed during the 1920s, with many related bank failures. Turner, as a "Son of the Wild Jackass" and one of four speakers at the Republican National Convention of 1928, urged the party to support farm relief. He traveled twice to Washington to unsuccessfully plead the same cause with President Hoover during the 1930s.

In 1926, Senator Albert B. Cummins died in office. Turner was nominated but refused the nomination.

=== Governorship and Cow War ===
In the June 1930 primary, Turner won 229,645 votes against Ed Smith's 116,431 and Otto Lange's 21,263. He was elected in a landslide, as a Republican, to be governor.

Turner played a decisive role in the Iowa Cow War of 1931. To keep people from contracting bovine tuberculosis, a State law mandated testing of dairy cows and destroying diseased animals. Farmers across Iowa responded with suspicion and hostility. When some banded together near Tipton, Iowa to prevent the tests from taking place and violence broke out, Turner as governor restored peace by calling out the Iowa National Guard. This act earned him the enmity of many farmers and may have contributed to his re-election defeat in 1932 by Democrat Clyde L. Herring, though this was the year of the Roosevelt-led Democratic sweep, when Republicans were removed from office nationwide.

=== Post-Governorship Political Activity ===
Turner ran for governor again in 1934, but lost that election as well. He did not run for office again but remained active in politics. He served on the War Production Board from 1942 until 1945. He supported fellow Republican Dwight Eisenhower in the presidential race of 1952, but turned against Eisenhower after a meeting with the President yielded disappointment on farm-related matters. In the election of 1956, he crossed party lines and supported Democrat Adlai Stevenson for president. Still advocating for farmers' interests at age 78, he was active in founding the National Farmers Organization, recalling Thomas Jefferson when he cited the “yeoman farmer, who has been the bulwark of our nation.”

== Later years ==
At the end of his life, remembering his part in the Spanish–American War, Turner was heard to say, “They gave us the Springfield rifle. I wish I had never learned to shoot it. They said we were fighting for liberty, but it was cruel, it was cruel.” He died in Corning at age 92 and is buried there in Walnut Grove Cemetery.

== Notable Relatives ==
Singer-songwriter Glen Phillips of Toad The Wet Sprocket is a great-great-nephew of Gov. Turner.

His nephew, Francis A. Turner, also served in the Iowa Senate from 1957 to 1961.

Party political offices
| Preceded by John Hammill | Republican nominee Governor of Iowa; 1930, 1932, 1934 | Succeeded by George A. Wilson |
Political offices
| Preceded by John Hammill | Governor of Iowa; January 15, 1931 – January 12, 1933 | Succeeded by Clyde L. Herring |
