= 1932 Iowa gubernatorial election =

- November 8, 1932
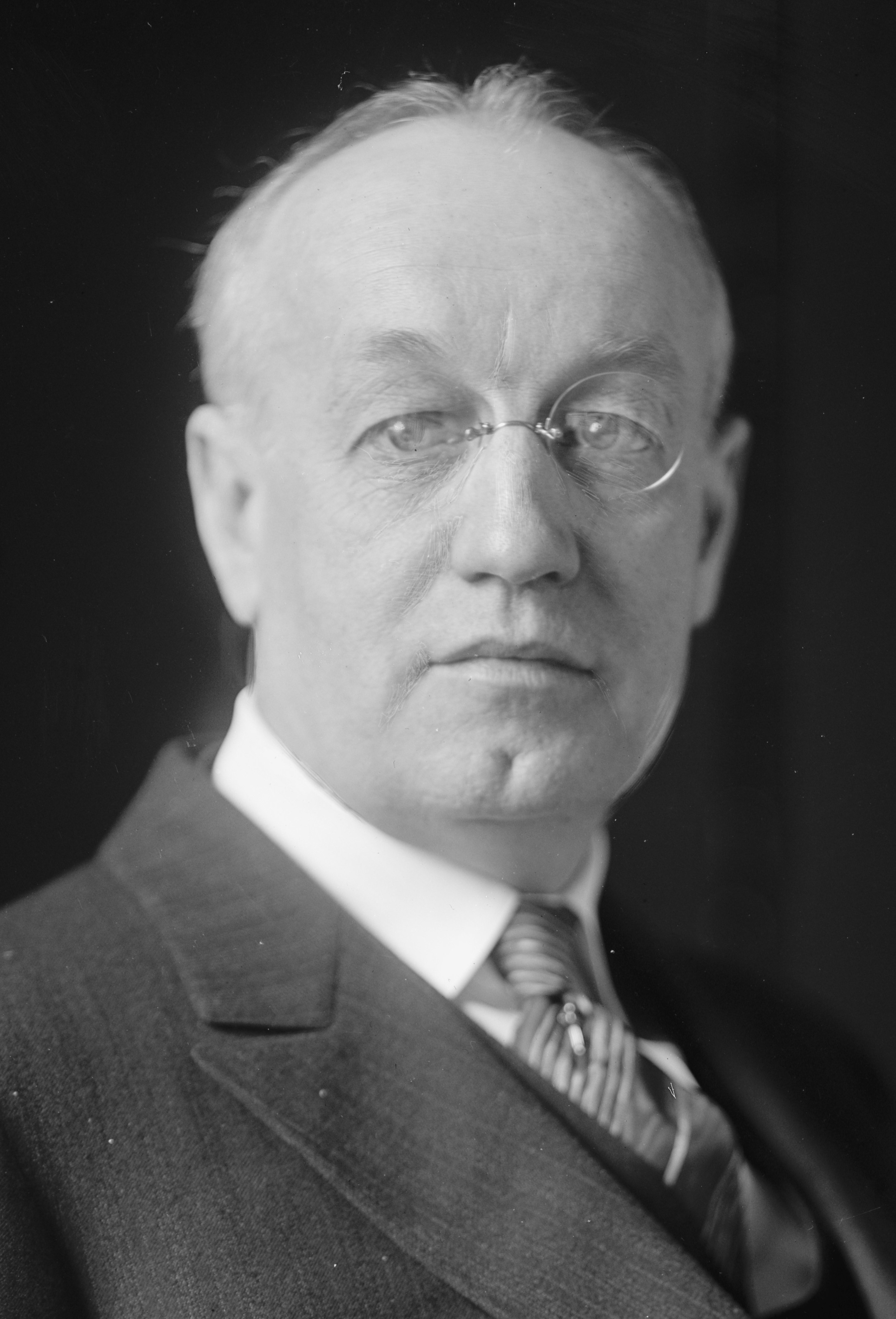

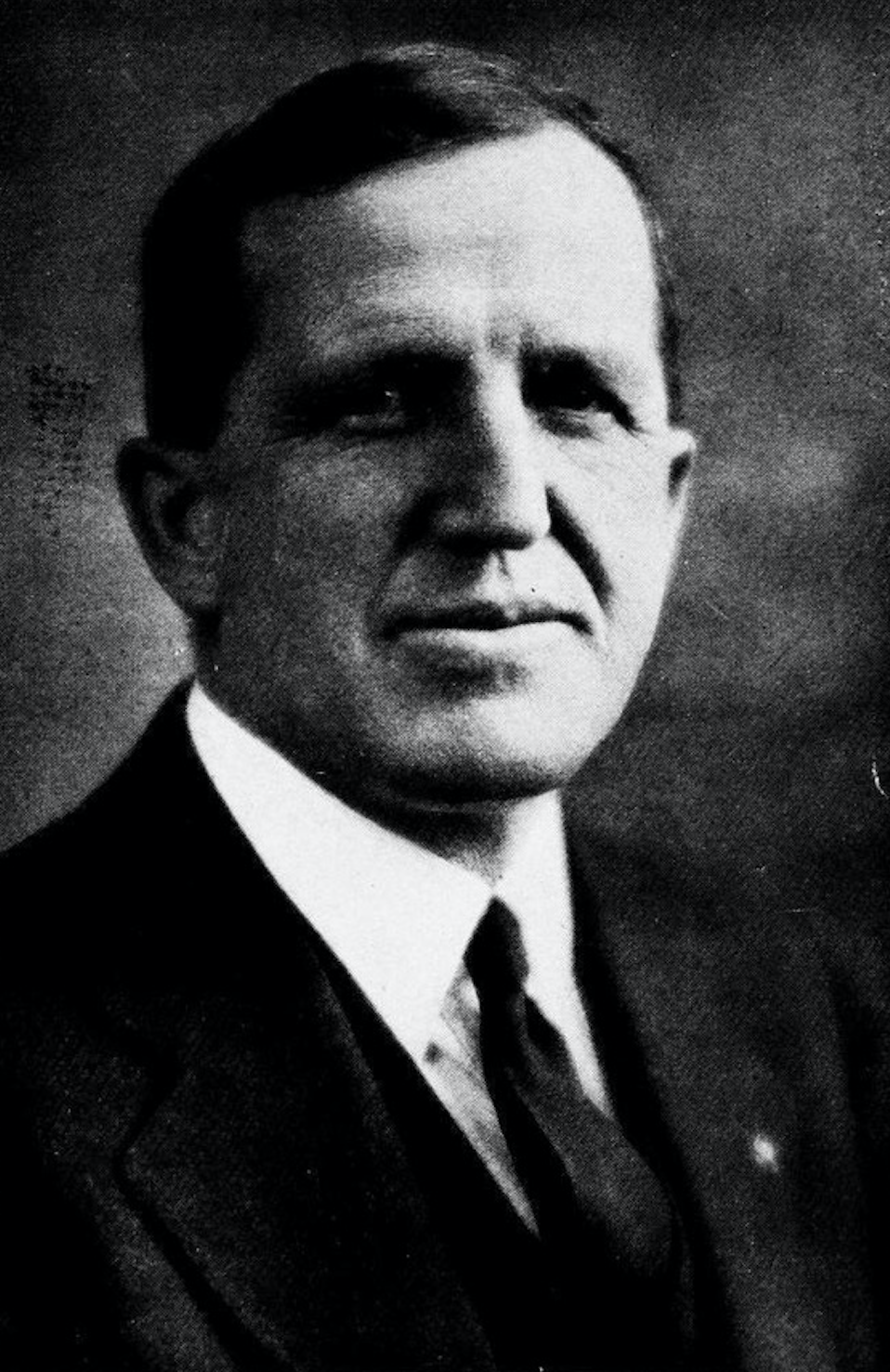
Nominee	Clyde L. Herring	Dan W. Turner
Party	Democratic	Republican
Popular vote	508,573	455,145
Percentage	52.77%	47.23%
- County results Herring: 50–60% 60–70% 70–80% Turner: 40–50% 50–60% 60–70% 70–80%
Governor before election
Dan W. Turner
Republican
Elected Governor
Clyde L. Herring
Democratic

The 1932 Iowa gubernatorial election was held on November 8, 1932. Democratic nominee Clyde L. Herring defeated incumbent Republican Dan W. Turner with 52.77% of the vote.

== Primary elections ==
Primary elections were held on June 6, 1932.

=== Democratic primary ===
==== Candidates ====
- Clyde L. Herring, businessman
- Louis E. Roddewig
- L. W. Housel, former Connecticut State Representative

==== Results ====
Democratic primary results
Party	Candidate	Votes	%
Democratic	Clyde L. Herring	51,372	44.21
Democratic	Louis E. Roddewig	37,228	32.04
Democratic	L. W. Housel	27,589	23.75
Total votes		116,189	100.00

=== Republican primary ===
==== Candidates ====
- Dan W. Turner, incumbent Governor
- Otto Lange
- J. W. Kime
- Louis J. Kehoe

==== Results ====
Republican primary results
Party	Candidate	Votes	%
Republican	Dan W. Turner (incumbent)	274,280	68.53
Republican	Otto Lange	52,826	13.20
Republican	J. W. Kime	43,228	10.80
Republican	Louis J. Kehoe	29,905	7.47
Total votes		400,239	100.00

== General election ==
=== Candidates ===
- Clyde L. Herring, Democratic
- Dan W. Turner, Republican

=== Results ===
1932 Iowa gubernatorial election
Party	Candidate	Votes	%	±%
Democratic	Clyde L. Herring	508,573	52.77%	
Republican	Dan W. Turner (incumbent)	455,145	47.23%	
Majority		53,428		
Turnout				
Democratic gain from Republican		Swing		
