= Charles Rollin Keyes =

Geologist and politician

Charles Rollin Keyes (December 24, 1864 – 1942) was a U.S. geologist and in 1918 was a U.S. Senate candidate in Iowa. Born in Des Moines, Iowa, he graduated from the State University of Iowa in 1887. He worked for the United States Geological Survey. He earned a Ph.D. from Johns Hopkins University in the year 1892. He served as Assistant State Geologist of Iowa, Director of the Bureau of Geology and Mines of Missouri and was president of the New Mexico Institute of Mining and Technology at Socorro. Keyes was also an avid ornithologist, publishing the first detailed listing of birds in Iowa in 1889. In 1918 he was the Democratic candidate for the U.S. Senate from Iowa, losing to William S. Kenyon.

== Selected works by Keyes ==
- 1884 Paleontology of Missouri (Missouri Geological Survey Vol. IV, Pts. 1–2)
- 1889 Preliminary Annotated Catalogue of the Birds of Iowa. Proc. of the Davenport Academy of Natural Sciences, Vol. V, pp. 113–161.
- 1894 Coal Deposits of Iowa Iowa Geological Survey
- 1895 Geology of Des Moines County. Iowa Geological Survey, Des Moines.
- 1895 Origin and Relation of Central Maryland Granites, U.S. Geological Survey.
- 1910 A Family of Great Horned Owls. The Independent:852–859.
- 1910 Geology of Iowa County. Iowa Geological Survey, Des Moines.
- 1913 Historical Sketch of Mining in Iowa. Iowa Geological Survey, Des Moines.

Party political offices
First	Democratic nominee for U.S. Senator from Iowa (Class 2); 1918	Succeeded by Clyde L. Herring
