= 1930 Iowa gubernatorial election =

1930 election for the governor of Iowa

- November 4, 1930
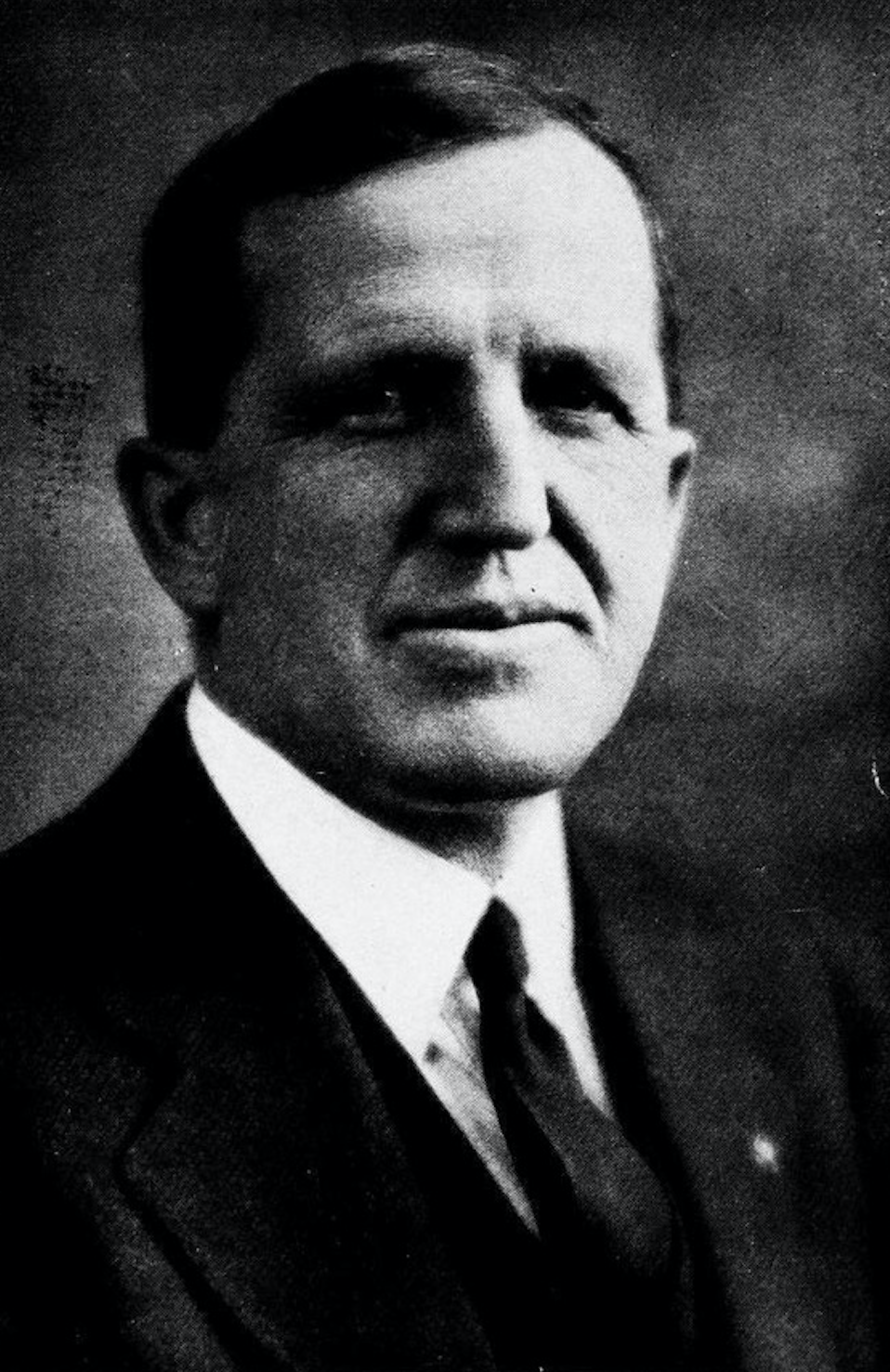

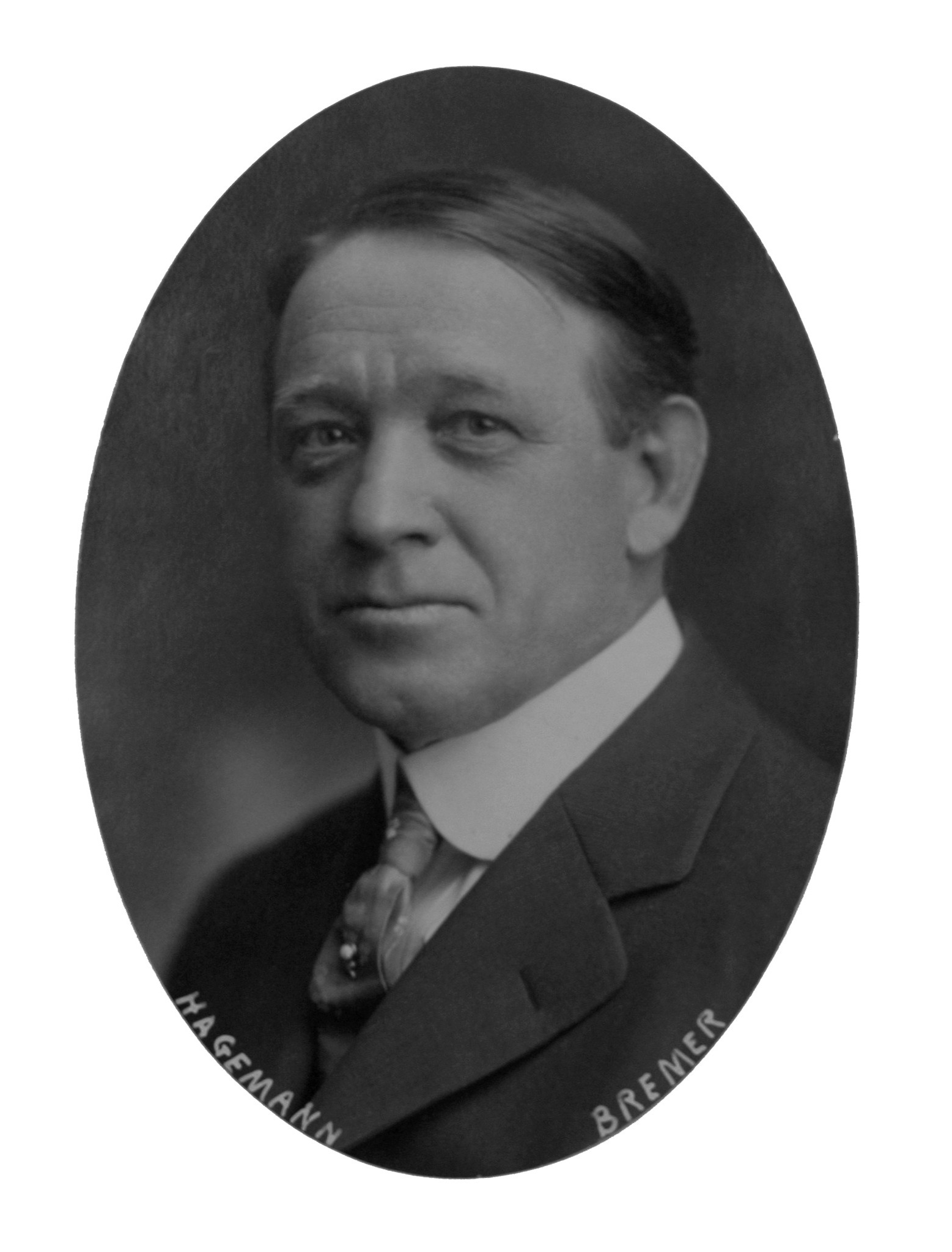
Nominee	Dan W. Turner	Fred P. Hagemann
Party	Republican	Democratic
Popular vote	364,036	186,039
Percentage	65.74%	33.60%
- County results Turner: 50–60% 60–70% 70–80% 80–90% Hagemann: 50–60% 60–70%
Governor before election
John Hammill
Republican
Elected Governor
Dan W. Turner
Republican

The 1930 Iowa gubernatorial election was held on November 4, 1930. Republican nominee Dan W. Turner defeated Democratic nominee Fred P. Hagemann with 65.74% of the vote.

== General election ==
=== Candidates ===
Major party candidates

- Fred P. Hagemann, Democratic
- Dan W. Turner, Republican

Other candidates

- William Patten, Communist
- John M. Smith, Farmer–Labor

=== Results ===
1930 Iowa gubernatorial election
Party	Candidate	Votes	%	±%
Republican	Dan W. Turner	364,036	65.74%	
Democratic	Fred P. Hagemann	186,039	33.60%	
Farmer–Labor	John M. Smith	2,489	0.45%	
Communist	William Patten	1,200	0.22%	
Majority		177,997		
Turnout				
Republican hold		Swing		
