= William S. Kenyon (Iowa politician) =

American judge (1869–1933)

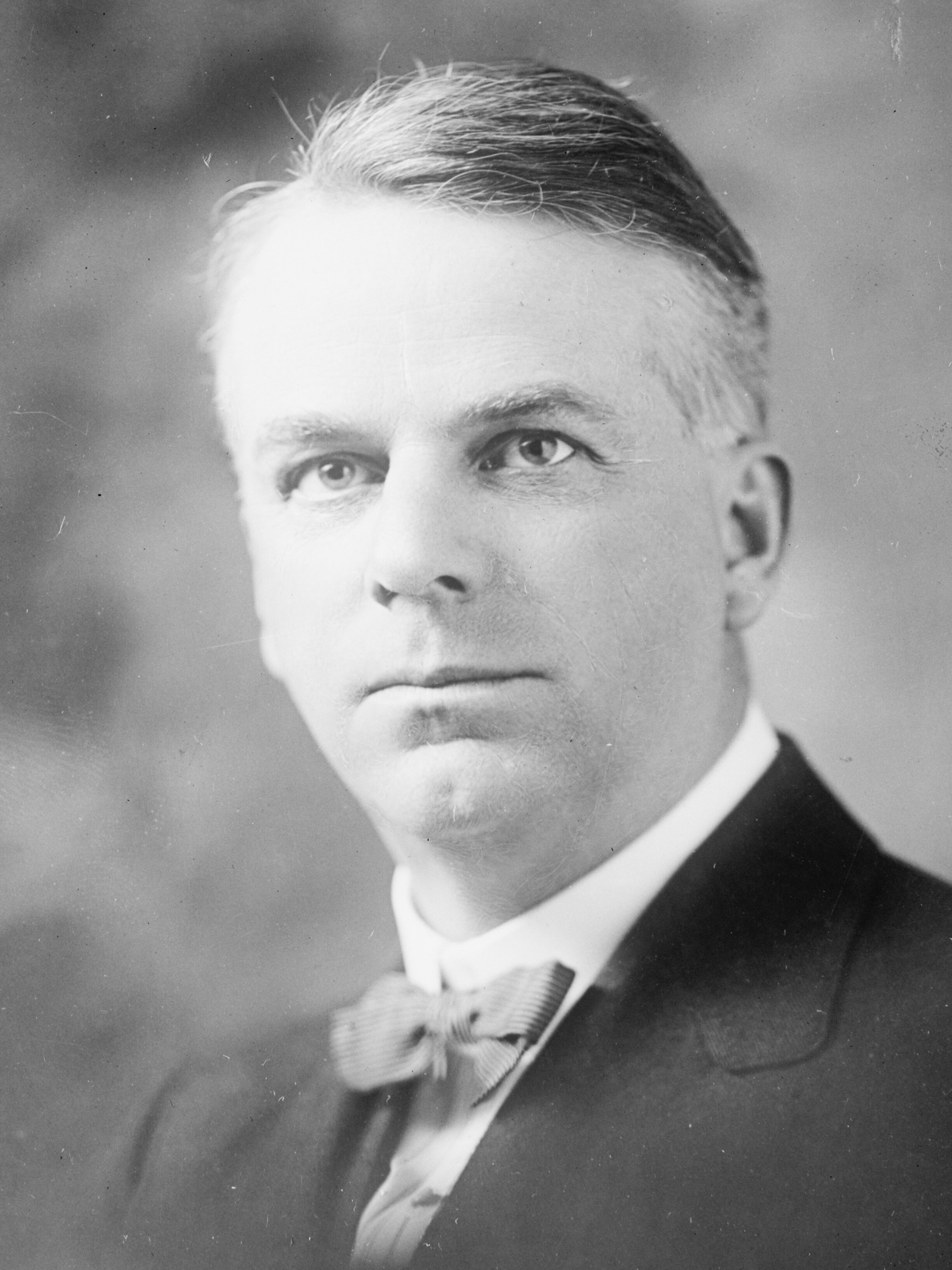
- Kenyon, 1909–1920

Judge of the United States Court of Appeals for the Eighth Circuit
- In office January 31, 1922 – September 9, 1933
- Appointed by: Warren G. Harding
- Preceded by: Walter I. Smith
- Succeeded by: Charles Breckenridge Faris

United States Senator from Iowa
- In office April 12, 1911 – February 24, 1922
- Preceded by: Lafayette Young
- Succeeded by: Charles A. Rawson

Personal details
- Born: William Squire Kenyon; June 10, 1869 Elyria, Ohio, U.S.
- Died: September 9, 1933 (aged 64) Sebasco Estates, Maine, U.S.
- Resting place: Oakland Cemetery; Fort Dodge, Iowa
- Party: Republican
- Education: Grinnell College; University of Iowa read law
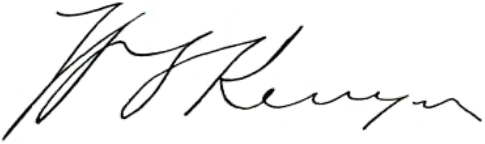
- Signature

William Squire Kenyon (June 10, 1869 – September 9, 1933) was a United States senator from Iowa, and a United States circuit judge of the United States Court of Appeals for the Eighth Circuit.

== Education and career ==
Born on June 10, 1869, in Elyria, Lorain County, Ohio, Kenyon attended Grinnell College and the University of Iowa, then read law in 1891. He was admitted to the bar and entered private practice in Fort Dodge, Iowa, from 1891 to 1911. He was prosecutor for Webster County, Iowa from 1892 to 1896. He returned to private practice in Webster County from 1897 to 1900, and from 1902 to 1904. He was a Judge of the Iowa District Court for the Eleventh Judicial District from 1900 to 1902, before leaving to accept a position with his father-in-law, J. F. Duncombe, who was Iowa counsel for the Illinois Central Railroad. Kenyon succeeded his father-in-law as the railroad's Iowa counsel upon Duncombe's death in 1904. In 1908, Kenyon was promoted and served as the railroad's general counsel for all lines north of the Ohio River. He was an assistant to the Attorney General of the United States from 1910 to 1911.

== United States Senate service ==
Kenyon, relatively unknown in political circles, announced his candidacy for election to the United States Senate by the 1911 Iowa General Assembly. Considered "a conservative with progressive proclivities," he sought to wrest the seat away from fellow Republican Lafayette Young, who had been appointed by the governor upon the death of Jonathan P. Dolliver. On April 12, 1911, Kenyon was elected on the 67th ballot after a session-long stalemate, in which Young was his principal Republican adversary until the 23rd ballot. Kenyon was re-elected to the Senate in January 1913 (by legislative ballot) and November 1918 (by direct popular election, following ratification of the Seventeenth Amendment to the United States Constitution), defeating Democrat Charles Rollin Keyes, a noted geologist.

In April 1917, Kenyon received a letter from Iowa Attorney General Horace Havner concerning the 1912 Villisca axe murders. In the Senate, Kenyon was considered a leading progressive and co-sponsored the Clayton Antitrust Act, the Federal Trade Commission Act, and the Child Labor Act. In 1921, he formed the bipartisan "farm bloc" in the Senate, which led to the enactment of several farm-related bills, such as the Packers and Stockyards Act, regulation of grain futures and futures trading in grain, and the Fordney–McCumber Tariff. A supporter of Prohibition, he co-authored the Webb–Kenyon Act, which was intended to bolster the ability of states to enforce their own prohibition laws (prior to the adoption of the Volstead Act).

On the eve of the United States' entry into World War I, Kenyon was one of a group of twelve senators who blocked President Woodrow Wilson's armed neutrality bill, which would have given Wilson the power to arm American vessels. However, after Wilson asked Congress to declare war one month later, Kenyon voted in favor of the declaration. Following the Armistice, when Wilson pressed the Senate to support the United States' membership in the League of Nations, Kenyon became a member of the moderate faction known as the "mild reservationists," who allowed for the possibility of membership so long as the treaty were amended to address a specified list of reservations held by those senators and pursued compromise solutions. However, when Wilson refused to compromise, Kenyon continued to oppose United States membership.

Kenyon served as Chairman of the Committee on Expenditures in the Department of State in the Sixty-second Congress, Chairman of the Committee on Expenditures in the War Department (also in the Sixty-second Congress), Chairman of the Committee on Standards, Weights and Measures (in the Sixty-fifth Congress), Chairman of the Committee on Education and Labor (in the Sixty-sixth Congress and Sixty-seventh Congress), and Chairman of the Committee on the Philippines (in the Sixty-sixth Congress). Kenyon resigned from the Senate on February 24, 1922, to accept a federal judgeship.

== Federal judicial service ==
Kenyon was nominated by President Warren G. Harding on January 31, 1922, to a seat on the United States Court of Appeals for the Eighth Circuit vacated by Judge Walter I. Smith. He was confirmed by the United States Senate on January 31, 1922, and received his commission the same day. His service terminated on September 9, 1933, due to his death.

=== Notable case ===
In 1926, Kenyon wrote the Eighth Circuit's ruling in the principal civil suit arising from the Teapot Dome scandal. Reversing a federal district court in Wyoming, the appellate court panel ordered the lower court to cancel the Mammoth Oil Co.'s leases, demand an accounting of the oil which had been taken from Teapot Dome, and the company was enjoined from trespassing further on United States Government property.

== Political offers ==
While a sitting federal judge, Kenyon was the subject of numerous offers of appointive and elective office. In January 1923, before the death of President Harding, newspapers speculated that Judge Kenyon would be Harding's leading opponent in the 1924 presidential race. At the 1924 Republican National Convention, he was touted as a potential vice-presidential candidate with Calvin Coolidge, and he received 172 votes on the first ballot. Even though President Coolidge indicated that Kenyon would be acceptable to him, the Convention instead selected Charles Dawes, who did not get along with Coolidge and many others. Coolidge offered Kenyon the position of Secretary of the Navy, but Kenyon declined to accept it. While a judge, he also served as an active member of a blue-ribbon "National Commission on Law Observance and Enforcement," better known as the "Wickersham Commission," appointed by President Herbert Hoover to assess the lessons learned from Prohibition, among other things.

== Supreme Court consideration ==
In 1930, following the death of United States Supreme Court Justice Edward Terry Sanford, Kenyon was considered by some as a favorite to succeed him, but President Hoover instead nominated John J. Parker (who failed to win Senate confirmation) and then Owen Roberts (who was confirmed). In January 1932, when Justice Oliver Wendell Holmes retired, Kenyon's name was again included on short lists of potential successors, but this time Hoover selected New York Court of Appeals Judge Benjamin Cardozo.

== Death ==
On September 9, 1933, at age 64, Kenyon died in Sebasco Estates, Maine, where he kept a summer home. He was interred in Oakland Cemetery in Fort Dodge.

== Honors ==
There are streets in Des Moines, Iowa, and Fort Dodge named after Kenyon.

== Personal ==
Kenyon married Mary Duncombe in 1893, one year after beginning service as a prosecutor for Webster County.

== Sources ==
- United States Congress. "KENYON, William Squire (id: K000129)". Biographical Directory of the United States Congress.
- "Kenyon, William Squire - Federal Judicial Center". www.fjc.gov.
- "Papers of William S. Kenyon - Special Collections - The University of Iowa Libraries". www.lib.uiowa.edu.

Party political offices
First	Republican nominee for United States Senator from Iowa (Class 2); 1918	Succeeded by Smith W. Brookhart
Preceded by Charles Curtis	Secretary of the Senate Republican Conference; 1913–1915	Succeeded by James Wolcott Wadsworth Jr.
U.S. Senate
Preceded by Lafayette Young	United States Senator (Class 2) from Iowa; 1911–1922; Served alongside: Albert B. Cummins	Succeeded by Charles A. Rawson
Preceded by Elihu Root	Chairman of the Senate State Department Expenditures Committee; 1911–1912	Succeeded by William Purnell Jackson
Preceded by Henry A. du Pont	Chairman of the Senate War Department Expenditures Committee; 1911–1913	Succeeded by Miles Poindexter
Preceded by Moses E. Clapp	Chairman of the Senate Standards Committee; 1917–1919	Succeeded by James A. Reed
Preceded by John F. Shafroth	Chairman of the Senate Philippines Committee; 1919	Succeeded by Warren G. Harding
Preceded by M. Hoke Smith	Chairman of the Senate Education Committee; 1919–1922	Succeeded by William Borah
Legal offices
Preceded by Walter I. Smith	Judge of the United States Court of Appeals for the Eighth Circuit; 1922–1933	Succeeded by Charles Breckenridge Faris
