= 1918 United States Senate election in Iowa =

- November 5, 1918
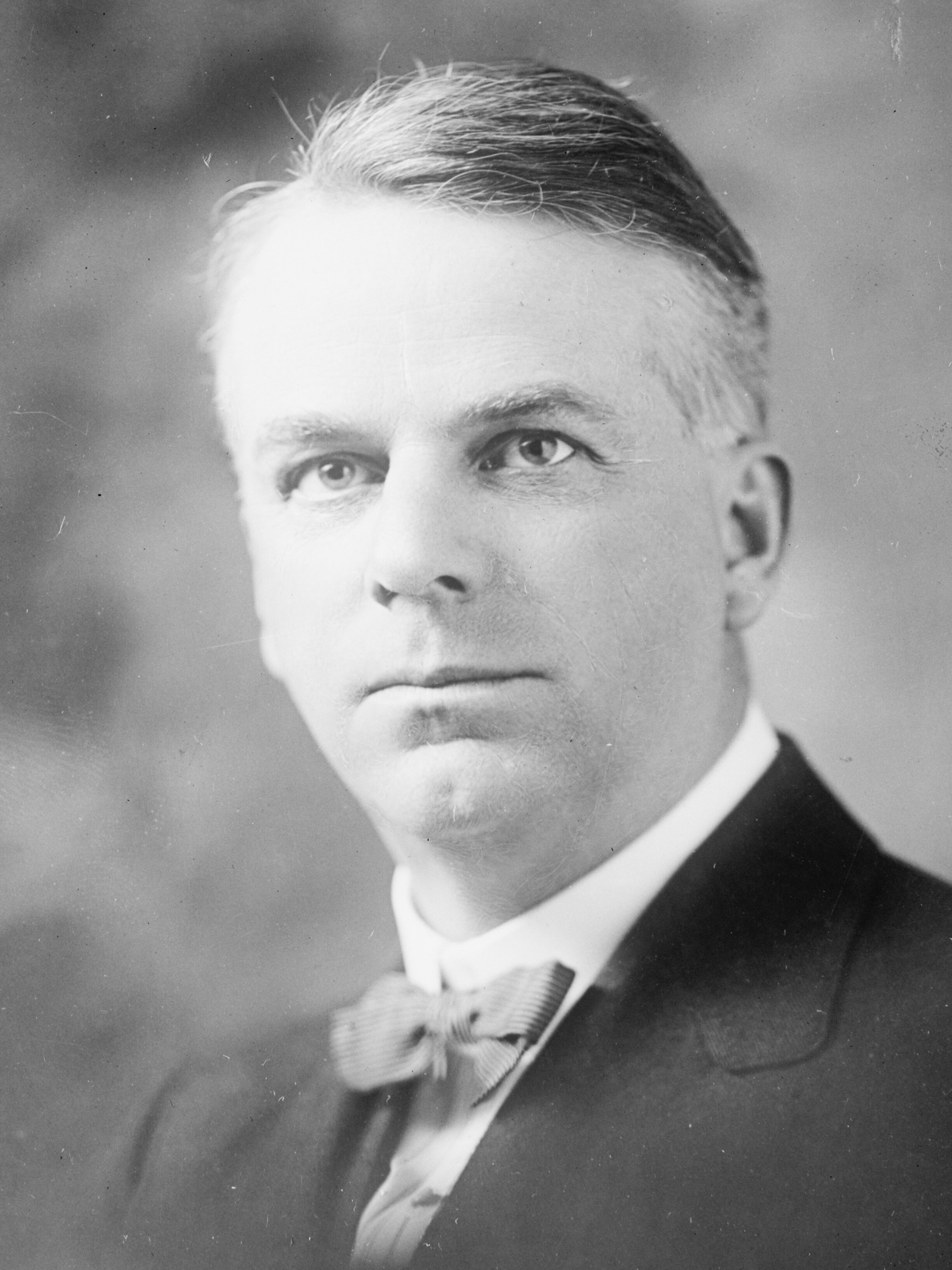

Nominee	William S. Kenyon	Charles R. Keyes
Party	Republican	Democratic
Popular vote	230,264	121,830
Percentage	65.40%	34.60%
- County results Kenyon: 50–60% 60–70% 70–80% 80–90% Keyes: 50–60%
U.S. senator before election
William S. Kenyon
Republican
Elected U.S. Senator
William S. Kenyon
Republican

The 1918 United States Senate election in Iowa took place on November 5, 1918. Incumbent Republican Senator William S. Kenyon was re-elected to a second term in office over Democrat Charles Rollin Keyes.

== General election ==
=== Candidates ===
- William S. Kenyon, incumbent U.S. Senator since 1911 (Republican)
- Charles Rollin Keyes, geologist and ornithologist (Democratic)

=== Results ===
1918 U.S. Senate election in Iowa
Party	Candidate	Votes	%
Republican	William S. Kenyon (incumbent)	230,264	65.40%
Democratic	Charles Rollin Keyes	121,830	34.60%
Total votes		352,094	100.00%

== See also ==
- 1918 United States Senate elections
