= Webb–Kenyon Act =

- Other short titles: Kenyon Bill; Webb Bill
- Long title: An Act divesting intoxicating liquors of their interstate character in certain cases.
- Nicknames: Interstate Transportation Liquor Act
- Enacted by: the 62nd United States Congress
- Effective: March 1, 1913

Citations
- Public law: 62-398
- Statutes at Large: 37 Stat. 700 aka 37 Stat. 699

Legislative history
- Introduced in the Senate as S. 4043 by William S. Kenyon (R-IA) on December 16, 1912; Passed the Senate on December 21, 1912 (passed); Passed the House on February 8, 1913 (247-72, in lieu of H.R. 17593); Vetoed by President William Howard Taft on February 28, 1913; Overridden by the Senate on February 28, 1913 (63-21); Overridden by the House and became law on March 1, 1913 (249-97)

The Webb–Kenyon Act was a 1913 law of the United States that regulated the interstate transport of alcoholic beverages. It was meant to provide federal support for the prohibition efforts of individual states in the face of charges that state regulation of alcohol usurped the federal government's exclusive constitutional right to regulate interstate commerce.

== Text ==
The statute reads:

The shipment or transportation, in any manner or by any means whatsoever of any spirituous, vinous, malted, fermented, or other intoxicating liquor of any kind from one State, Territory, or District of the United States, or place noncontiguous to, but subject to the jurisdiction thereof, into any other State, Territory, or District of the United States, or place noncontiguous to, but subject to the jurisdiction thereof, which said spirituous, vinous, malted, fermented, or other intoxicating liquor is intended by any person interested therein, to be received, possessed, sold, or in any manner used, either in the original package, or otherwise, in violation of any law of such State, Territory, or District of the United States, or place noncontiguous to, but subject to the jurisdiction thereof, is hereby prohibited.

== Enactment ==
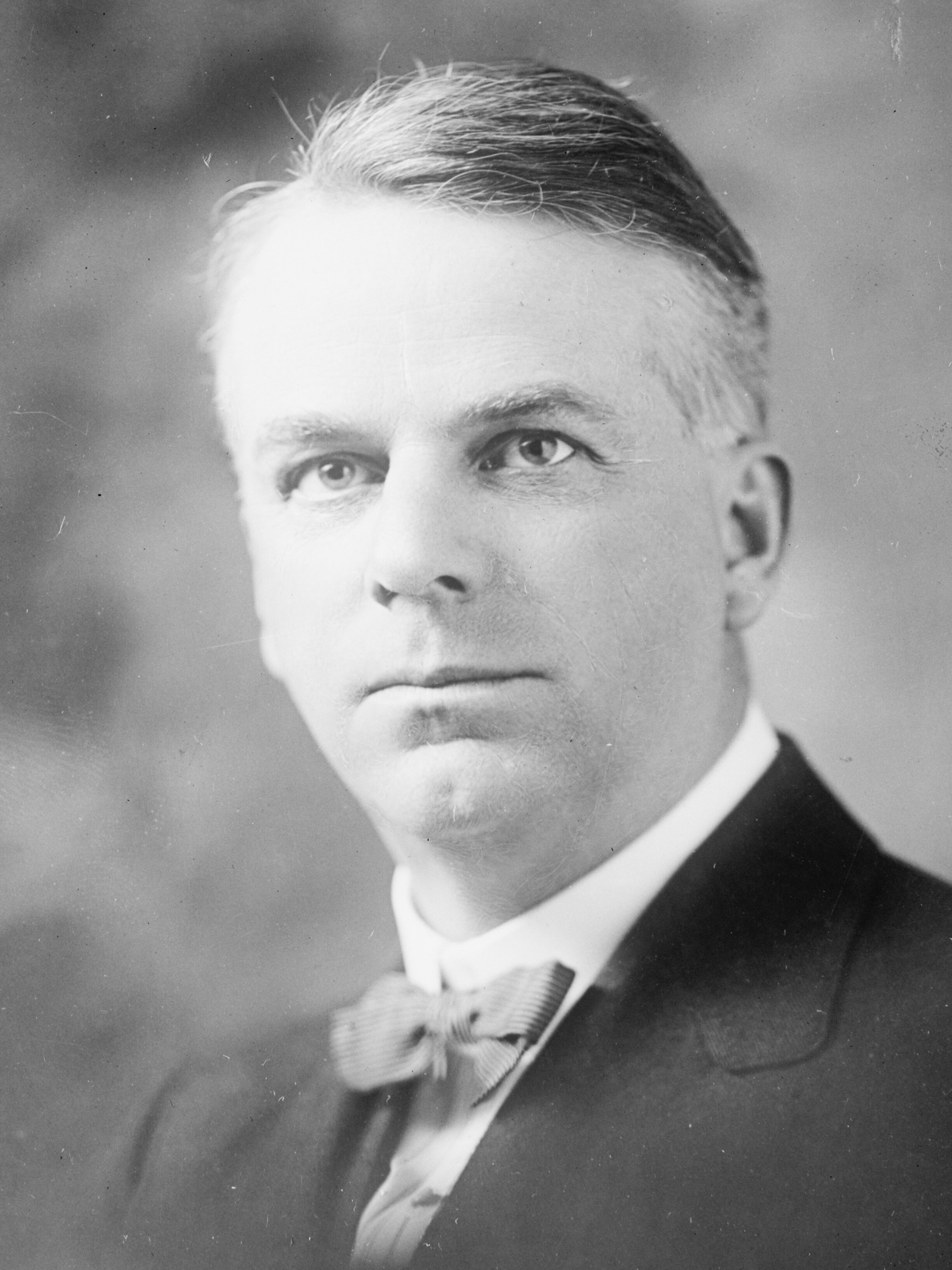
Photo of William S. Kenyon, Senator who sponsored the Act, and later a Federal Judge

The law was named for its principal sponsors, Democratic Rep. Edwin Y. Webb of North Carolina and Republican Sen. William S. Kenyon of Iowa. Congress passed the legislation and sent it to the President on February 18, 1913. Ten days later, on February 28, 1913, President William Howard Taft, in the closing days of his administration, vetoed the law on constitutional grounds, believing that it delegated to the individual states the federal government's exclusive right to regulate interstate commerce. He submitted with his veto an opinion by Attorney General George W. Wickersham. The Senate overrode his veto the same day by a vote of 63 to 21, and the House of Representatives did so by a vote of 246 to 85 on March 1, 1913.

The law did not simply prohibit the transport of alcoholic beverages into "dry" states, that is, states that banned alcohol. At the time of its passage and for years afterward, states varied greatly in their regulation of alcohol. Few banned alcohol entirely and were "bone-dry." Some allowed liquor to be ordered by mail but limited the amount per month per person or prohibited its receipt by businesses. They differed as well in their definitions of such beverages by alcohol content. The Webb–Kenyon Act established the federal government's endorsement of the right of each state to control the receipt, distribution, and consumption of alcoholic beverages within its jurisdiction.

Its passage, followed shortly by the passage of an income tax, was recognized as a major progressive victory and gave added impetus to the prohibition movement's drive for a constitutional amendment to ban alcohol nationwide.

== Constitutionality ==
The act faced challenges in the courts and the courts differed in their consideration of its constitutionality. Some lower courts declared complete bans on alcohol at the state level unconstitutional. The United States Supreme Court finally delivered an opinion of the Act on January 8, 1917 in the case of James Clark Distilling Co. v. Western Maryland R. Co. The Court sustained the Act by a vote of 7 to 2 in a decision by Chief Justice White in which a total of 6 justices concurred. The Court also affirmed the right of each state to regulate alcohol even to the extent of banning it completely. The case was a challenge to a West Virginia statute that banned shipments even for personal consumption.

Congress responded to the Supreme Court decision by immediately enacting legislation to make the District of Columbia "bone-dry."

Opponents of nationwide prohibition hoped the Supreme Court decision demonstrated that the ability of each state to exercise complete control over alcohol within its borders would make a constitutional amendment superfluous. "It is better," said the New York Times, "that prohibition laws should be made effective in communities that want them than that by a Federal amendment the rule of prohibition should be extended over unwilling States."

The Supreme Court added a further decision upholding the law in its next term in a case involving a North Carolina statute requiring railroads to maintain records of liquor shipments and recipients.

== Repeal of prohibition ==
The Webb–Kenyon Act became irrelevant with the adoption of national prohibition under the Eighteenth Amendment to the United States Constitution and the Volstead Act. With the movement to repeal prohibition by the adoption of the Twenty-first Amendment to the United States Constitution, the question of the Act's validity and enforcement became a political and policy issue once again. The Act was cited as a protection that would shelter dry states if prohibition were repealed.
