= 1934 Iowa gubernatorial election =

- November 6, 1934
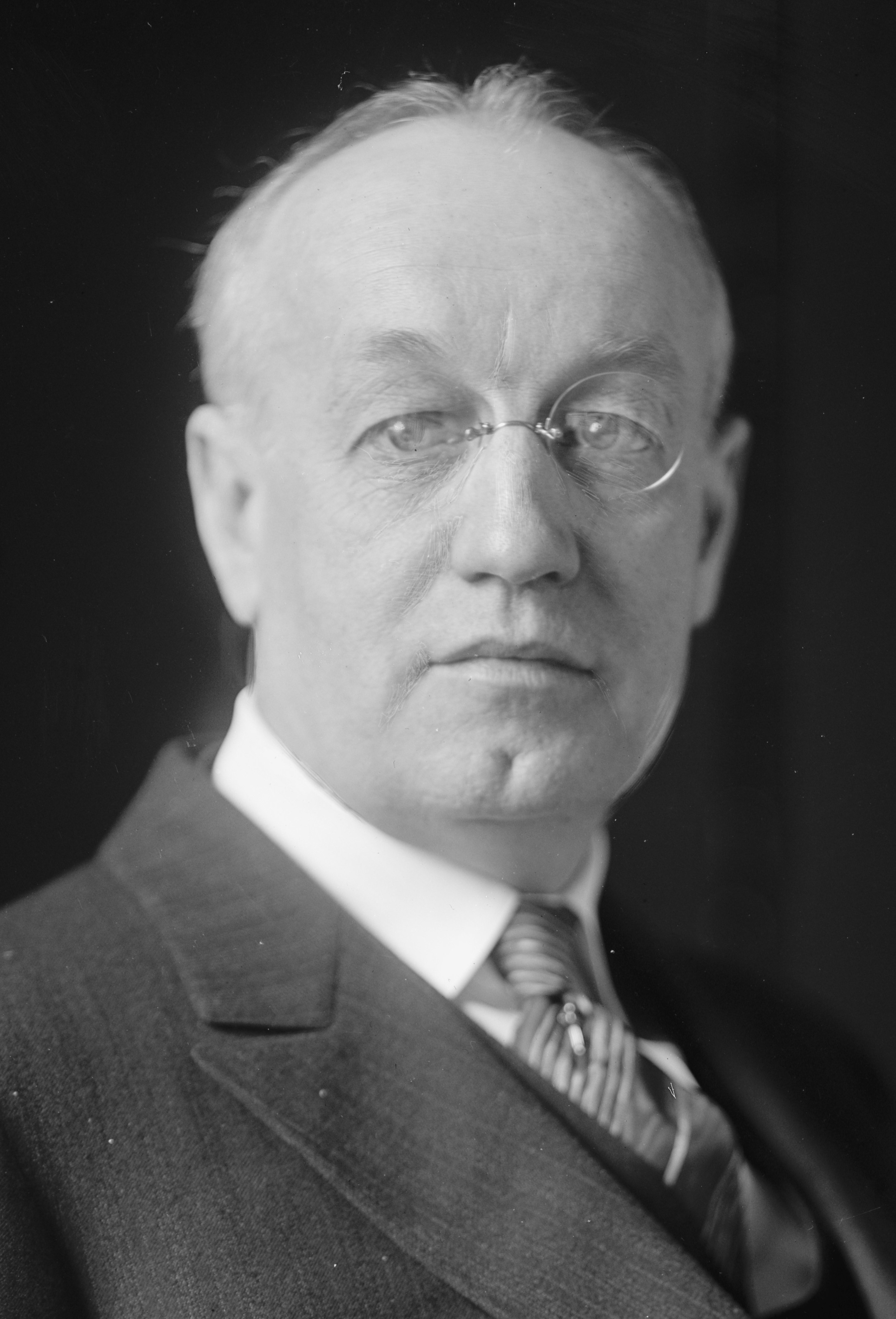

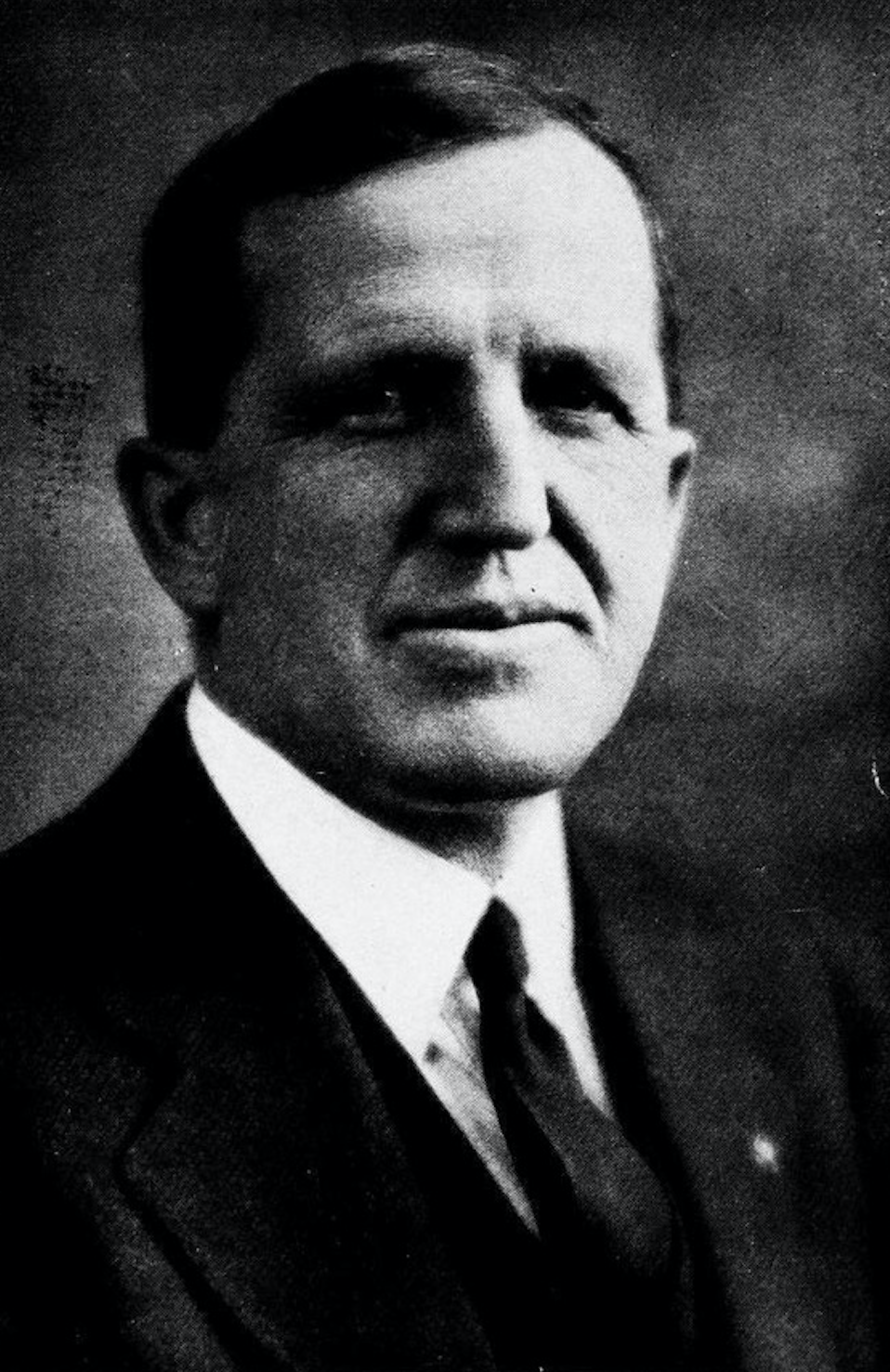
Nominee	Clyde L. Herring	Dan W. Turner
Party	Democratic	Republican
Popular vote	468,921	394,634
Percentage	51.75%	43.55%
- County results Herring: 40–50% 50–60% 60–70% 70–80% Turner: 50–60% 60–70% 70–80%
Governor before election
Clyde L. Herring
Democratic
Elected Governor
Clyde L. Herring
Democratic

The 1934 Iowa gubernatorial election was held on November 6, 1934. Incumbent Democrat Clyde L. Herring defeated Republican nominee Dan W. Turner with 51.75% of the vote.

== General election ==
=== Candidates ===
Major party candidates

- Clyde L. Herring, Democratic
- Dan W. Turner, Republican

Other candidates

- Wallace M. Short, Farmer–Labor
- L. J. U. Smay, Prohibition
- Arthur W. Saarman, Socialist
- Ira R. Meade, Communist

=== Results ===
1934 Iowa gubernatorial election
Party	Candidate	Votes	%	±%
Democratic	Clyde L. Herring (incumbent)	468,921	51.75%	
Republican	Dan W. Turner	394,634	43.55%	
Farmer–Labor	Wallace M. Short	37,032	4.09%	
Prohibition	L. J. U. Smay	2,193	0.24%	
Socialist	Arthur W. Saarman	1,866	0.21%	
Communist	Ira R. Meade	1,521	0.17%	
Majority		74,287		
Turnout				
Democratic hold		Swing		
