= 1936 United States Senate election in Iowa =

- November 3, 1936
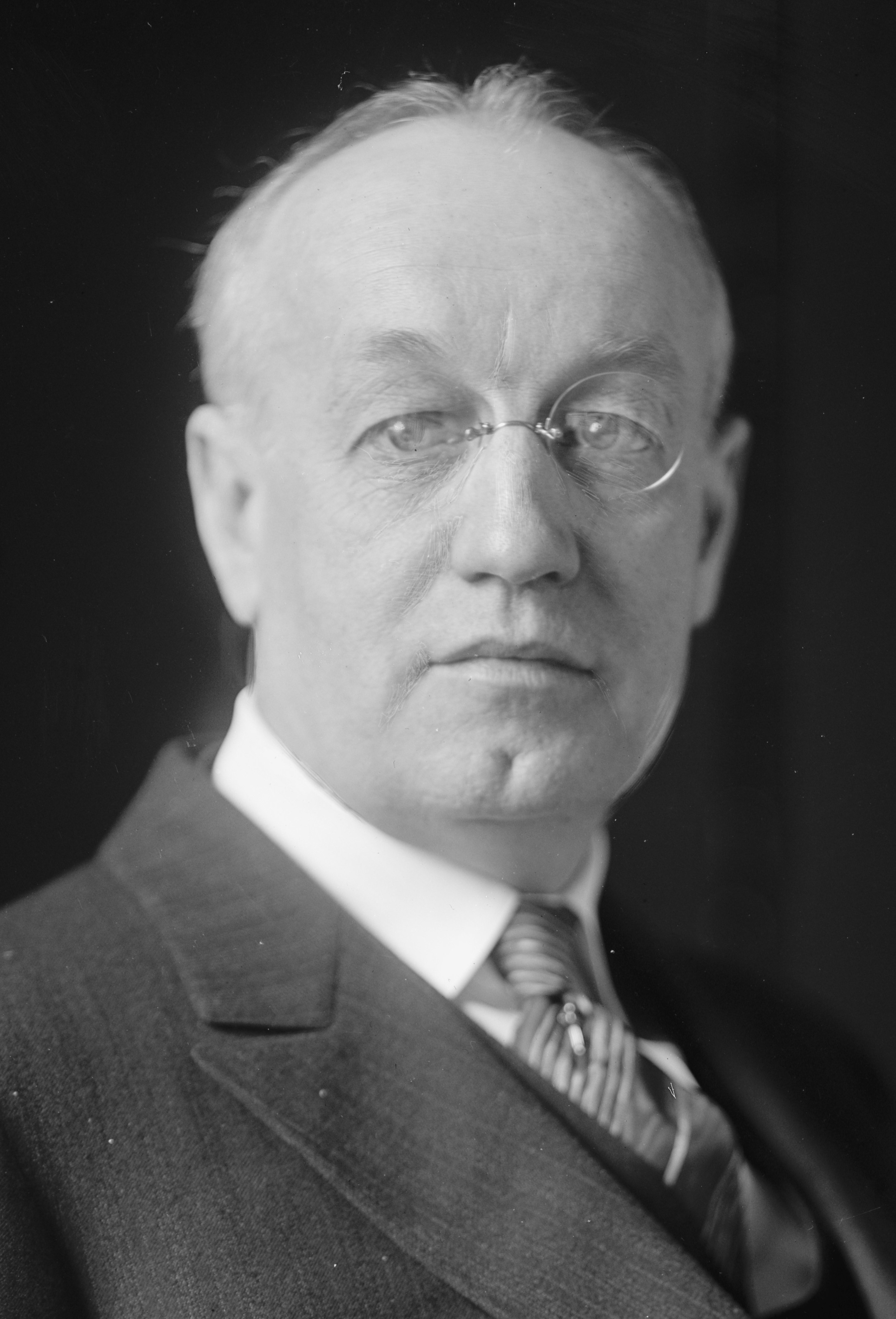

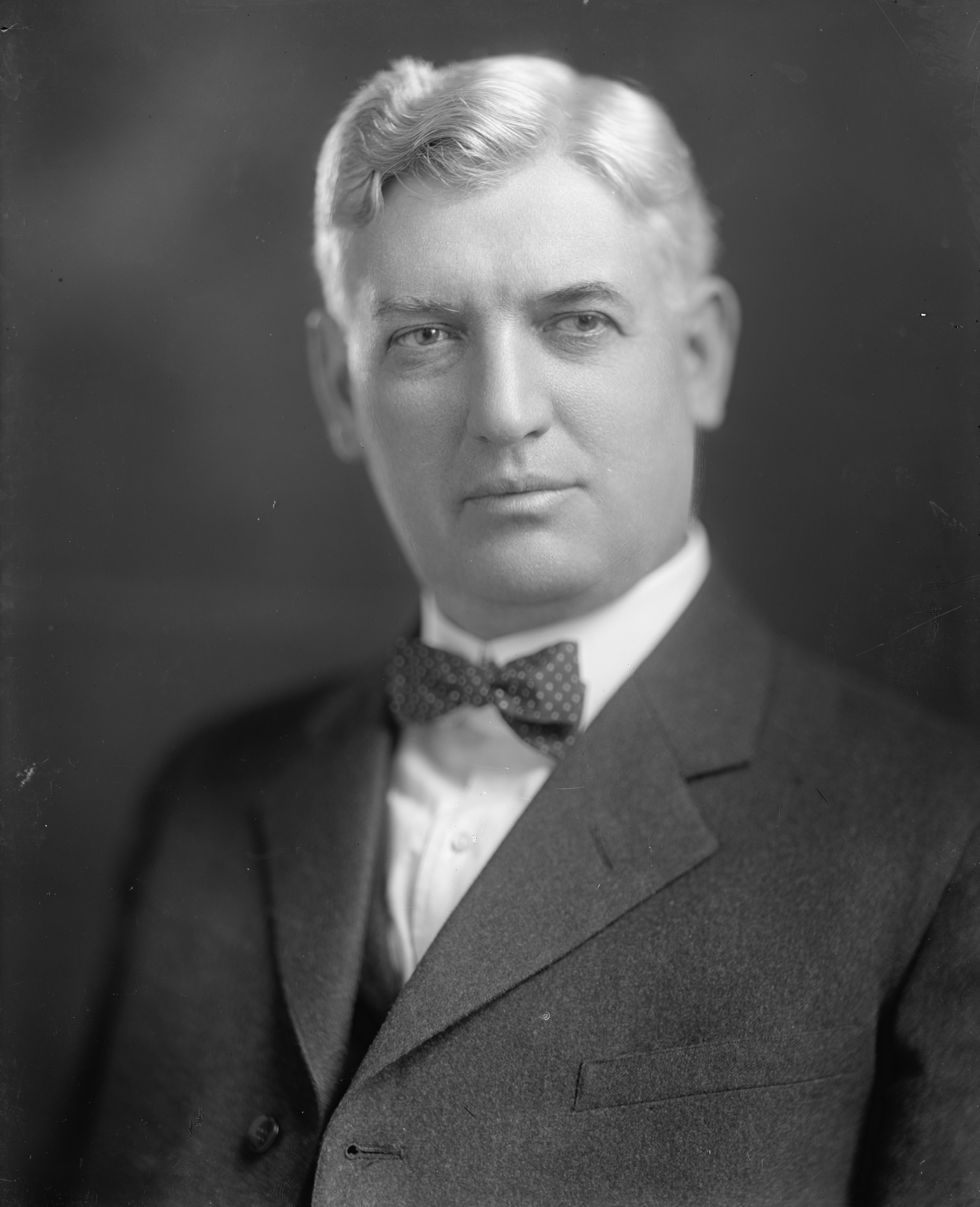
Nominee	Clyde L. Herring	L. J. Dickinson
Party	Democratic	Republican
Popular vote	539,554	504,535
Percentage	50.26%	47.34%
- County results Herring: 40–50% 50–60% 60–70% Dickinson: 40–50% 50–60% 60–70%
U.S. senator before election
Lester J. Dickinson
Republican
Elected U.S. Senator
Clyde Herring
Democratic

The 1936 United States Senate election in Iowa took place on November 3, 1936. Incumbent Republican Senator Lester J. Dickinson ran for re-election to a second term but was defeated by Democratic Governor Clyde L. Herring. This was the first time since 1855 that Democrats held both of the state's senate seats.

== Republican primary ==
=== Candidates ===
- Norman G. Baker, radio broadcaster
- Smith W. Brookhart, former U.S. Senator (1922–26, 1927–33)
- George Chaney
- Lester J. Dickinson, incumbent Senator since 1931
- Guy Linville
- Edwin Manning

=== Results ===
1936 Republican U.S. Senate primary
Party	Candidate	Votes	%
Republican	Lester J. Dickinson (incumbent)	105,416	40.51%
Republican	Smith W. Brookhart	58,129	22.34%
Republican	Edwin Manning	30,709	11.80%
Republican	Norman G. Baker	28,162	10.82%
Republican	Guy Linville	27,794	10.68%
Republican	George Chaney	9,994	3.84%
Total votes		260,204	100.00%

== Democratic primary ==
=== Candidates ===
- Clyde Herring, Governor of Iowa
- Hubert Utterback, U.S. Representative from Des Moines
- Samuel D. Whiting

=== Results ===
1936 Democratic U.S. Senate primary
Party	Candidate	Votes	%
Democratic	Clyde Herring	75,826	53.64%
Democratic	Hubert Utterback	49,341	34.90%
Democratic	Samuel D. Whiting	16,205	11.46%
Total votes		141,372	100.00%

== Farmer-Labor primary ==
=== Candidates ===
- George F. Buresh
- Francis G. Cutler

=== Results ===
1936 Farmer-Labor U.S. Senate primary
Party	Candidate	Votes	%
Farmer–Labor	George F. Buresh	1,199	71.80%
Farmer–Labor	Francis G. Cutler	471	28.20%
Total votes		1,670	100.00%

== General election ==
=== Results ===
1936 U.S. Senate election in Iowa
Party	Candidate	Votes	%	±%
Democratic	Clyde Herring	539,555	50.35%	▲7.32
Republican	Lester J. Dickinson (incumbent)	503,635	46.99%	▼9.30
Farmer–Labor	George F. Buresh	25,567	2.39%	▲1.90
Prohibition	John B. Hammond	1,726	0.16%	N/A
Socialist	Lacticia M. Conrad	1,233	0.12%	N/A
Total votes		1,071,716	100.00%	

== See also ==
- 1936 United States Senate elections
