= Sebasco Estates, Maine =

- Village
- Location within Maine
- Coordinates: 43°46′00″N 69°51′34″W
- Country: United States
- State: Maine
- County: Sagadahoc
- Elevation: 26 ft (7.9 m)
- Time zone: UTC-5 (Eastern (EST))
  - Summer (DST): UTC-4 (EDT)
- ZIP code: 04565
- Area code: 207
- GNIS feature ID: 575160

Sebasco Estates is an unincorporated village in the town of Phippsburg, Sagadahoc County, Maine, United States. The community is located on the Atlantic coast, 10.1 miles (16.3 km) south of Bath. Sebasco Estates has a post office, with ZIP code 04565.
