= 1932 United States Senate election in Iowa =

- November 8, 1932
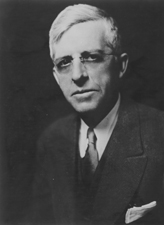

Nominee	Louis Murphy	Henry Field
Party	Democratic	Republican
Popular vote	538,422	399,929
Percentage	54.15%	40.22%
- County results Murphy: 30–40% 40–50% 50–60% 60–70% 70–80% Field: 40–50% 50–60%
U.S. senator before election
Smith W. Brookhart
Republican
Elected U.S. Senator
Louis Murphy
Democratic

The 1932 United States Senate election in Iowa took place on November 8, 1932. Incumbent Republican Senator Smith Brookhart, a controversial progressive figure within the conservative Iowa Republican Party, was defeated in the June Republican primary by Henry A. Field. Field was in turn defeated in the general election by Democrat Louis Murphy. Brookhart also entered the general election as the candidate of the Progressive Party but finished a distant third.

Primary elections were held on June 6. Field defeated Brookhart in the Republican primary, and Murphy defeated a four-man Democratic field including former senator Daniel F. Steck and future governor Nelson G. Kraschel.

Murphy's victory made him just the second Democratic senator from Iowa elected since 1852 and the first to win election directly. (Note: Daniel Steck, the earlier Senator, was elected following a lengthy challenge to the certified 1924 results in the U.S. Senate. He was seated by a vote of the Senate.) He was first elected to this seat since 1855.

== Background ==
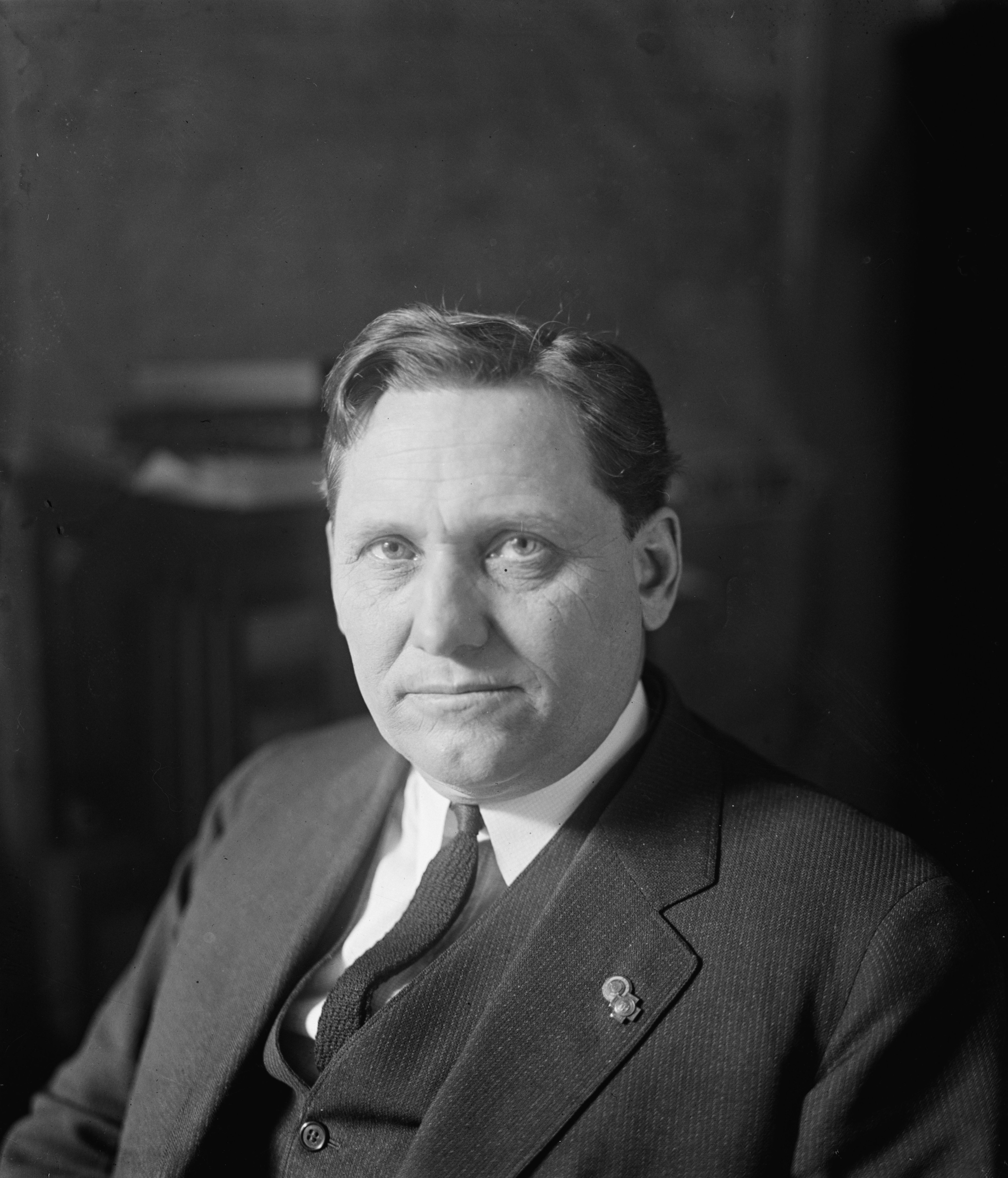
Smith Wildman Brookhart, the incumbent Senator since 1927, faced heavy opposition from the conservative element of the Iowa Republican Party.

Senator Smith W. Brookhart was first elected to the Senate in 1922, winning a special election to succeed William S. Kenyon. After joining the Senate, Brookhart's "pugnacious cowhide radicalism nettled patrician Senators." His indifference to President Calvin Coolidge in the 1924 presidential election also upset conservatives.

In 1924, he attempted to win re-election to a full term, and it initially appeared he had narrowly defeated Democratic nominee Daniel Steck despite the defection of many conservative Republicans. However, Steck challenged the result in the U.S. Senate and, during a lengthy process, the Iowa Republican Party sided with Steck. Brookhart was removed from office on April 12, 1926, and replaced with Steck by a vote of 45–41. A dozen Senate Republicans voted with Democrats to unseat Brookhart.

Immediately upon his ouster from the Senate, Brookhart returned to Iowa and challenged the incumbent Republican Senator for Iowa's other Senate seat, Albert B. Cummins, a respected veteran of the Senate. Brookhart defeated Cummins in a landslide, despite having little time or resources to mount a campaign, and was returned to the Senate in the fall in another landslide victory.

== Republican primary ==
=== Candidates ===
- Smith W. Brookhart, incumbent senator since 1927 (Note: Brookhart previously served a separate term in the Senate from 1922 to 1926.)
- Louis Cook, member of the state board of Assessment and Review
- George Cosson, former Iowa Attorney General and State Senator from Audubon
- L.E. Eickelberg
- Henry Ames Field, Shenandoah businessman, owner of Henry Field Seed and Nursery Co. and radio station KFNF
- Glenn C. Haynes, executive secretary of the Iowa Good Roads Association and former Iowa Auditor

=== Campaign ===
The first prominent challenger to Brookhart was George Cosson, a former Iowa Attorney General. In February, Brookhart accused Cosson of being "personally conducted" by Federal Reserve Bank chair Eugene Meyer, whose confirmation Brookhart had opposed. "This is simply an illustration of the political machine Wall Street is attempting to build up for the control of all the states through the federal reserve banking system, the federal land bank system, the joint stock land bank system and the intermediate credit bank system," said Brookhart. Brookhart further accused Meyer of bankrupting the nation's farmers and proposed instead a direct subsidy. Cosson declined to respond to the accusation.

Henry Field, a successful agribusinessman and radio station owner, entered the race in March in response to a draft effort by more conservative Republicans. He, Cosson, and Cook were soon joined by Glenn Haynes, a former state auditor and secretary of the Iowa Good Roads Association.

Eventually, conservatives joined in support of Field as the best alternative to Brookhart. In addition to traditional conservative lines of attack, Field criticized the Senator for missing sessions while on vacation and for the number of his relatives who held federal positions.

=== Results ===
1932 Republican U.S. Senate primary
Party	Candidate	Votes	%
Republican	Henry Ames Field	197,263	45.19%
Republican	Smith W. Brookhart (incumbent)	145,902	33.42%
Republican	Glenn C. Haynes	43,050	9.86%
Republican	George Cosson	29,687	6.80%
Republican	Louis Cook	12,103	2.77%
Republican	L.E. Eickelberg	8,513	1.95%
Write-in		44	0.01%
Total votes		436,562	100.00%

== Democratic primary ==
=== Candidates ===
- Fred P. Hagemann, nominee for Governor in 1930
- Nelson G. Kraschel, livestock farmer and auctioneer, future Lieutenant Governor of Iowa and Governor of Iowa
- Charles F. Lytle
- Louis Murphy, editor of the Dubuque Telegraph-Herald
- Daniel Steck, former U.S. Senator (1926–31)

=== Results ===
1932 Democratic U.S. Senate primary
Party	Candidate	Votes	%
Democratic	Louis Murphy	51,537	38.72%
Democratic	Daniel F. Steck	32,439	24.37%
Democratic	Nelson G. Kraschel	18,208	13.68%
Democratic	Charles F. Lytle	17,876	13.43%
Democratic	Fred P. Hagemann	13,046	9.80%
Total votes		133,106	100.00%

After losing the primary, Kraschel was nominated to run for Lieutenant Governor of Iowa.

== General election ==
=== Candidates ===
- Smith W. Brookhart, incumbent Senator since 1926 (Progressive)
- Henry Ames Field, Shenandoah nurseryman (Republican)
- Roy M. Harrop (Farmer-Labor)
- Peter Hunter (Communist)
- T.S. McCrill (Socialist)
- Louis Murphy, editor of the Dubuque Telegraph-Herald (Democratic)

=== Results ===
1932 U.S. Senate election in Iowa
Party	Candidate	Votes	%	±%
Democratic	Richard Louis Murphy	538,422	54.15%	▲10.84
Republican	Henry Ames Field	399,929	40.22%	▼16.39
Progressive Party (United States, 1924–1934)	Smith W. Brookhart (incumbent)	43,174	4.34%	N/A
Socialist	T.S. McCrill	11,076	1.11%	N/A
Farmer–Labor	Roy M. Harrop	1,228	0.12%	N/A
Communist	Peter Hunter	467	0.05%	N/A
Total votes		831,839	100.00%	

== See also ==
- 1932 United States Senate elections
