= 1936 United States Senate special election in Iowa =

1936 United States Senate Special Election
- November 3, 1936
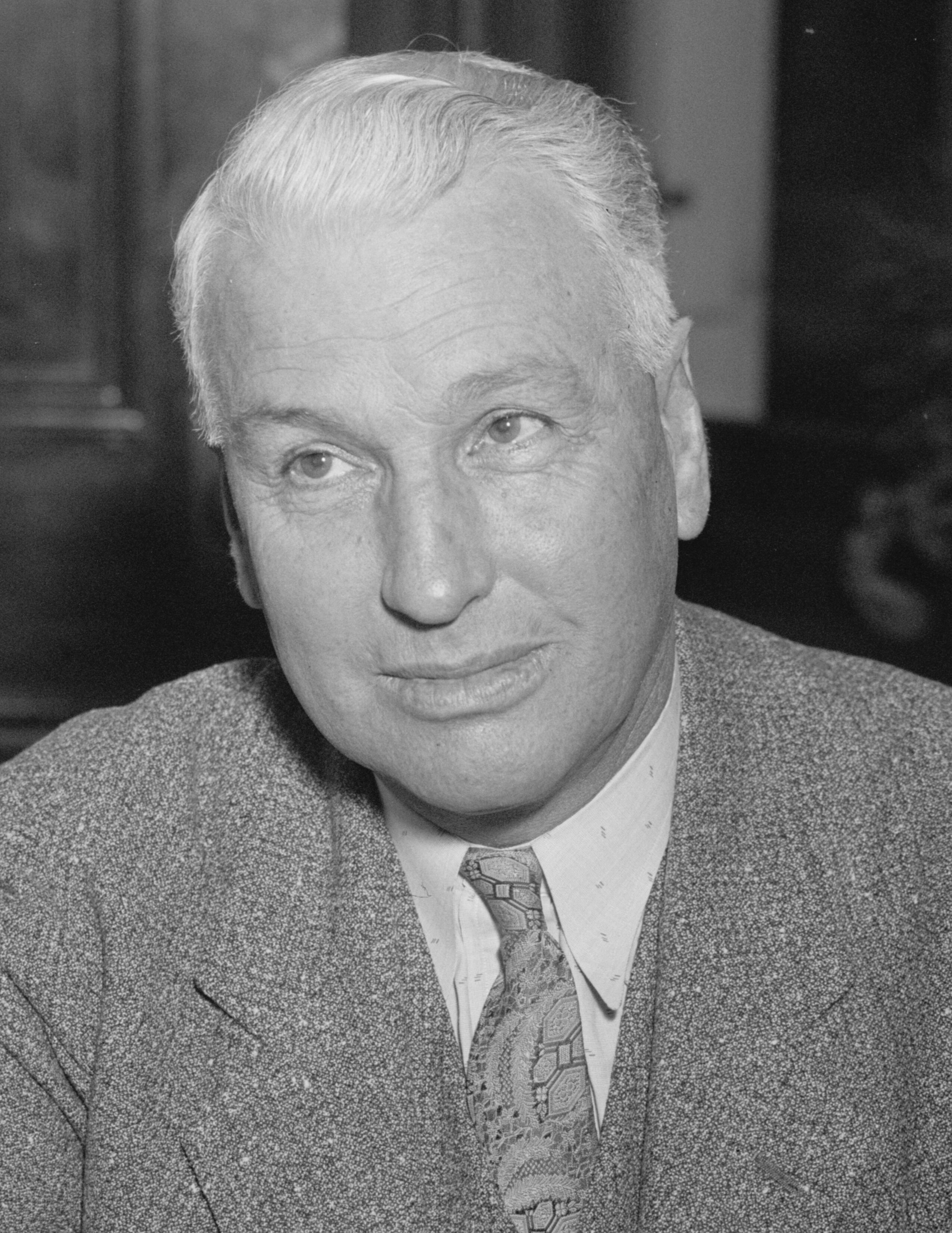

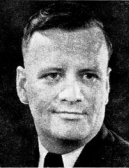
	Majority party	Minority party
Candidate	Guy M. Gillette	Berry F. Halden
Party	Democratic	Republican
Popular vote	536,075	478,521
Percentage	51.91%	46.43%
- County results Gillette: 40–50% 50–60% 60–70% Halden: 40–50% 50–60% 60–70%
U.S. senator before election
Vacant
Elected U.S. Senator
Guy M. Gillette
Democratic

The 1936 United States Senate Special Election within the State of Iowa occurred on November 3, 1936, following the death of incumbent Senator Richard Louis Murphy in an automobile accident. Representative Guy Mark Gillette (D-IA) and Editor of the Chariton Herald-Patriot, Berry F. Halden(R-IA) were the two major party contenders in this election. George F. Buresh (FL-IA) and two other candidates also ran. The result of this election was Gillette beating out both other candidates, and winning with 52% of the votes cast.

== Republican primary ==
Berry F. Halden won the Republican nomination at the Republican Party's State Convention on the fifth ballot, with 1,682 votes. Other candidates within the primary were James R. Rhodes, a publisher for the Newton News, and Guy Linville, a lawyer from Cedar Rapids.

== Democratic primary ==
Guy M. Gillette was named the Democratic Party's Candidate at the Democratic Party's State Convention. Ray Murphy, Former National Commander of the American Legion, declined to contest the Primary.

== Farmer-Labor primary ==
While the Farmer-Labor Party initially sought out and declared Former Republican Senator Smith W. Brookhart to be their nominee, Ernest R. Quick ran as their eventual candidate for the Special Election.

== General Election ==
1936 U.S. Senate Special election in Iowa
Party	Candidate	Votes	%	±%
Democratic	Guy M. Gillette	536,075	51.91	N/A
Republican	Berry F. Halden	478,521	46.43	N/A
Farmer–Labor	Ernest R. Quick	16,179	1.57	N/A
Socialist	Tom Johnson	1,008	0.10	N/A
Prohibition	A. U. Coates	960	0.09	N/A
Total votes		1,032,743	100	

== See also ==
- 1936 United States Senate elections
