= 1938 United States Senate election in Iowa =

- November 8, 1938
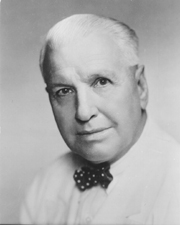

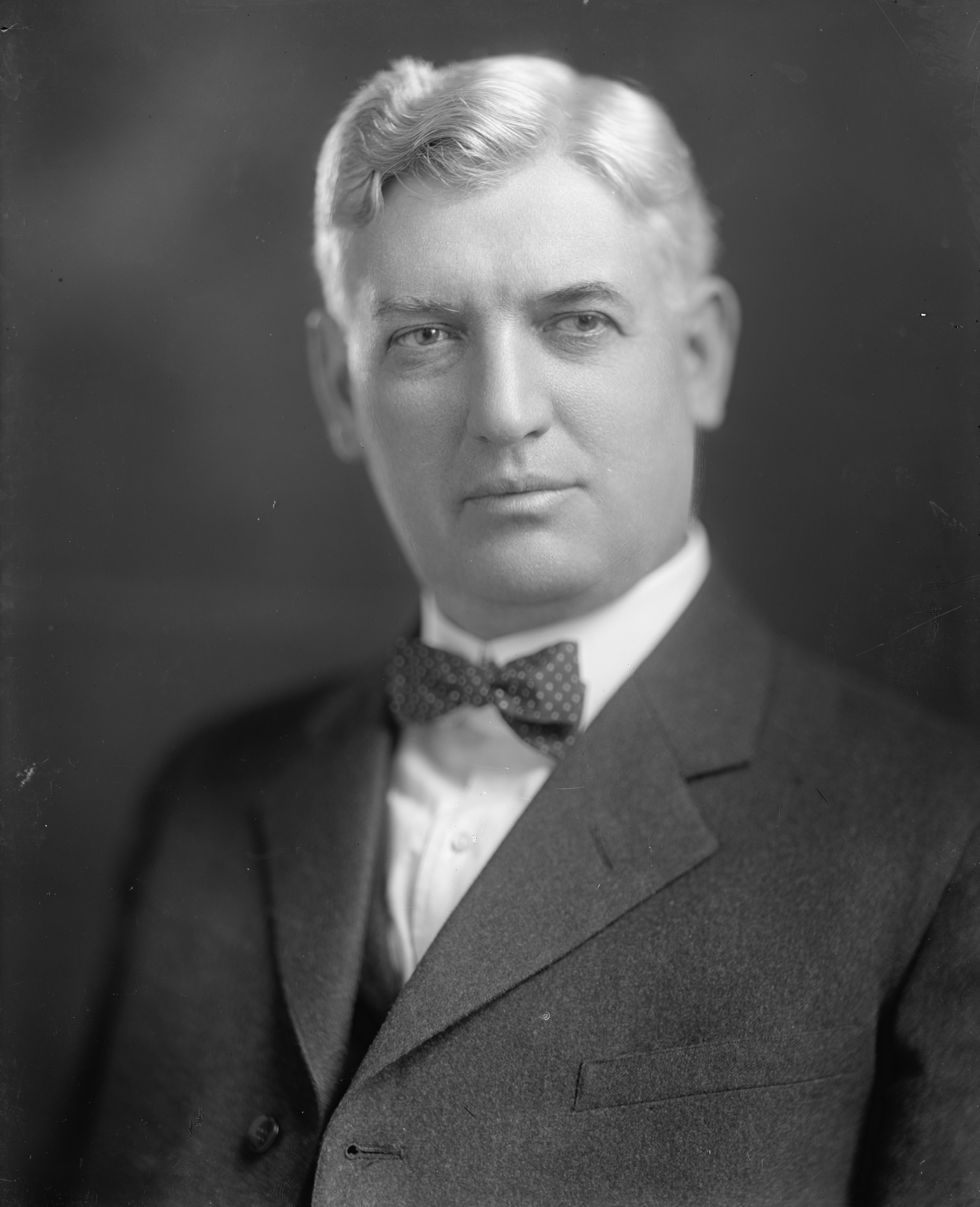
Nominee	Guy M. Gillette	Lester J. Dickinson
Party	Democratic	Republican
Popular vote	413,788	410,983
Percentage	49.74%	49.41%
- County results Gillette: 40–50% 50–60% 60–70% 70–80% Dickinson: 40–50% 50–60% 60–70%
U.S. senator before election
Guy M. Gillette
Democratic
Elected U.S. Senator
Guy M. Gillette
Democratic

The 1938 United States Senate election in Iowa took place on November 8, 1938. Incumbent Democratic Senator Guy M. Gillette, who won a special election to complete the unexpired term of Richard Louis Murphy, won a full term in office by defeating Republican former Senator Lester J. Dickinson. Gillette and Dickinson had briefly served together in the final months of 1936.

Primary elections were held on June 6. Gillette overcame a primary challenge from U.S. Representative Otha Wearin, who was personally recruited by President Franklin D. Roosevelt given Gillette's opposition to New Deal programs. Dickinson defeated Representative Lloyd Thurston for the Republican nomination.

== Democratic primary ==
=== Candidates ===
- Wilson G. Byerhoff
- Guy M. Gillette, incumbent Senator since 1936
- Joseph J. Meyers
- Mrs. Ellsworth Richardson
- Otha Wearin, U.S. Representative from Glenwood

=== Results ===
1938 Democratic U.S. Senate primary
Party	Candidate	Votes	%
Democratic	Guy M. Gillette (incumbent)	81,605	51.96%
Democratic	Otha Wearin	43,044	27.41%
Democratic	Joseph J. Meyers	17,497	11.14%
Democratic	Mrs. Ellsworth Richardson	9,445	6.01%
Democratic	Wilson G. Byerhoff	5,465	3.48%
Total votes		157,056	100.00%

== Republican primary ==
=== Candidates ===
- Lester J. Dickinson, former U.S. Senator (1931–37)
- Lloyd Thurston, U.S. Representative from Osceola

=== Results ===
1938 Republican U.S. Senate primary
Party	Candidate	Votes	%
Republican	Lester J. Dickinson	146,764	56.97%
Republican	Lloyd Thurston	110,847	43.03%
Total votes		257,611	100.00%

== General election ==
=== Candidates ===
- G.W. Bauseman (Prohibition)
- George F. Buresh (Farmer-Labor)
- Lester J. Dickinson, former U.S. Senator (1931–37) (Republican)
- Guy M. Gillette, incumbent Senator since 1936 (Democratic)
- Raymond E. Hanke (Progressive)

=== Results ===
1938 U.S. Senate election in Iowa
Party	Candidate	Votes	%	±%
Democratic	Guy M. Gillette (incumbent)	413,788	49.74%	▼2.17
Republican	Lester J. Dickinson	410.983	49.41%	▲3.07
Farmer–Labor	George F. Buresh	4,723	0.57%	▼1.00
Progressive Party	Raymond E. Hanke	1,525	0.18%	N/A
Prohibition	G. W. Bauseman	820	0.10%	▲0.01
Total votes		831,839	100.00%	

== See also ==
- 1938 United States Senate elections
