= 1922 United States Senate special election in Iowa =

- November 7, 1922
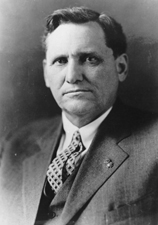

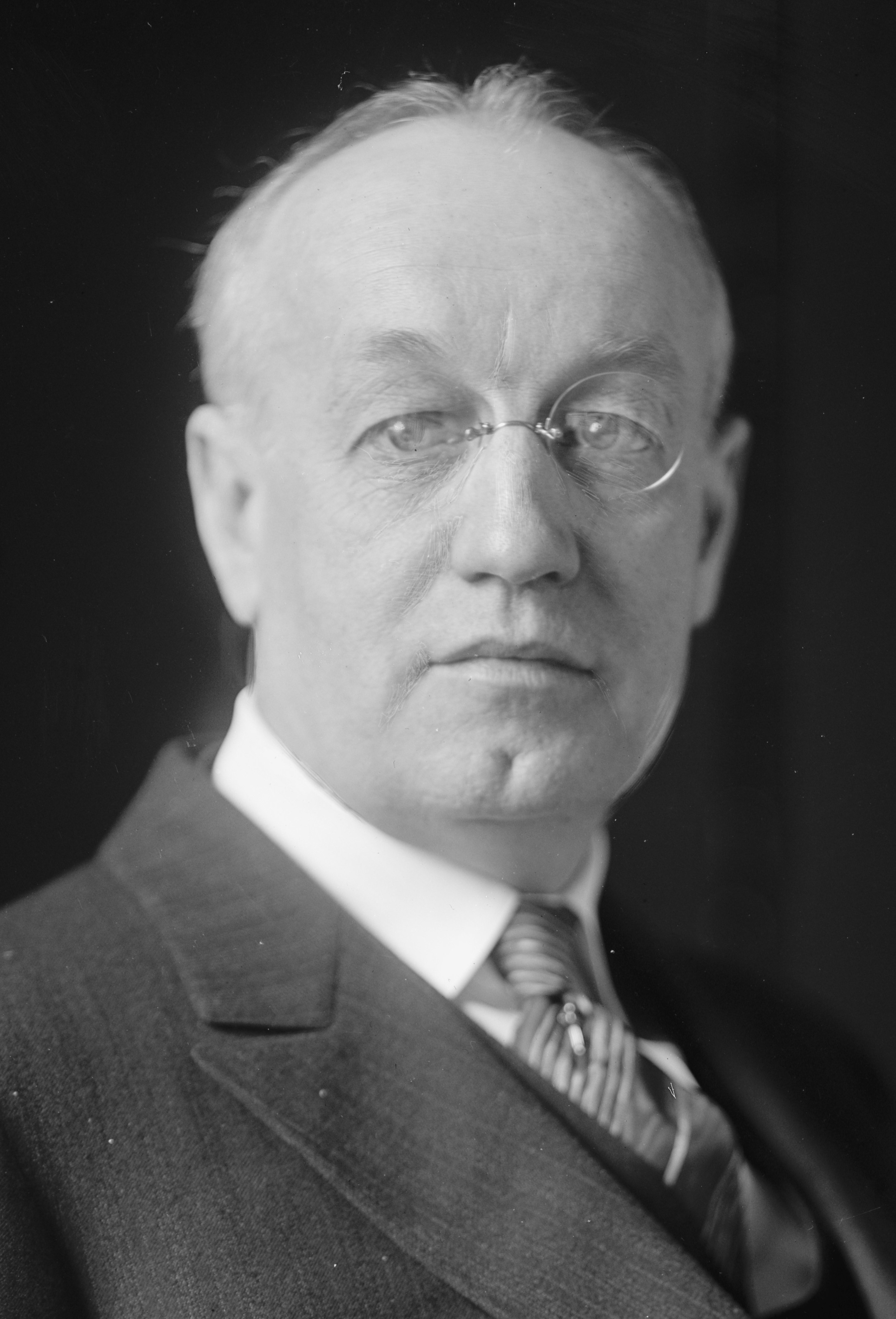
Nominee	Smith W. Brookhart	Clyde Herring
Party	Republican	Democratic
Popular vote	389,751	227,833
Percentage	63.11%	36.89%
- County results Brookhart: 50–60% 60–70% 70–80% 80–90% Herring: 50–60%
U.S. senator before election
Charles A. Rawson
Republican
Elected U.S. Senator
Smith W. Brookhart
Republican

Republican primary results by county Brookhart: 20–30%; 30–40%; 40–50%; 50–60%; 60–70%; 70–80%; Thorne: 20–30%; 30–40%; 40–50%; Pickett: 30–40%; Francis: 40–50%; Sweet: 30–40%; 40–50%; 50–60%; 80–90%; Stanley: 30–40%

The 1922 United States Senate special election in Iowa took place on November 7, 1922. Republican Smith W. Brookhart was elected to complete the unexpired term of William S. Kenyon, defeating Democrat Clyde Herring.

== Background ==
Incumbent Republican Senator William S. Kenyon, whose term was not set to expire until 1925, resigned effective February 24, 1922 to accept an appointment by President Harding to the United States Court of Appeals for the Eighth Circuit. Governor Nathan Kendall appointed Charles A. Rawson to fill the vacant seat until a successor could be duly elected.

The special election to complete Kenyon's term was scheduled for November 7, coincident with the general election.

== Republican primary ==
=== Candidates ===
- Smith W. Brookhart, president of the National Rifle Association and candidate for U.S. Senate in 1920
- Leslie E. Francis
- Charles E. Pickett, former U.S. Representative from Waterloo
- Burton E. Sweet, U.S. Representative from Waverly
- Claude M. Stanley
- Clifford Thorne

=== Results ===
1922 Republican U.S. Senate primary
Party	Candidate	Votes	%
Republican	Smith W. Brookhart	133,102	41.13%
Republican	Clifford Thorne	52,783	16.31%
Republican	Charles E. Pickett	51,047	15.77%
Republican	Leslie E. Francis	38,691	11.96%
Republican	Burton E. Sweet	35,406	10.94%
Republican	Claude M. Stanley	12,593	3.89%
Total votes		323,622	100.00%

== General election ==
=== Candidates ===
- Smith W. Brookhart, president of the National Rifle Association and candidate for U.S. Senate in 1920 (Republican)
- Clyde Herring, nominee for governor of Iowa in 1920 (Democratic)

=== Results ===
1922 U.S. Senate special election in Iowa
Party	Candidate	Votes	%
Republican	Smith W. Brookhart	389,751	63.11%
Democratic	Clyde L. Herring	227,833	36.89%
Total votes		617,584	100.00%

== See also ==
- 1922 United States Senate elections
