= 1924 United States Senate election in Iowa =

American Election Results

- November 4, 1924
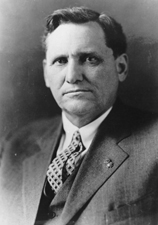

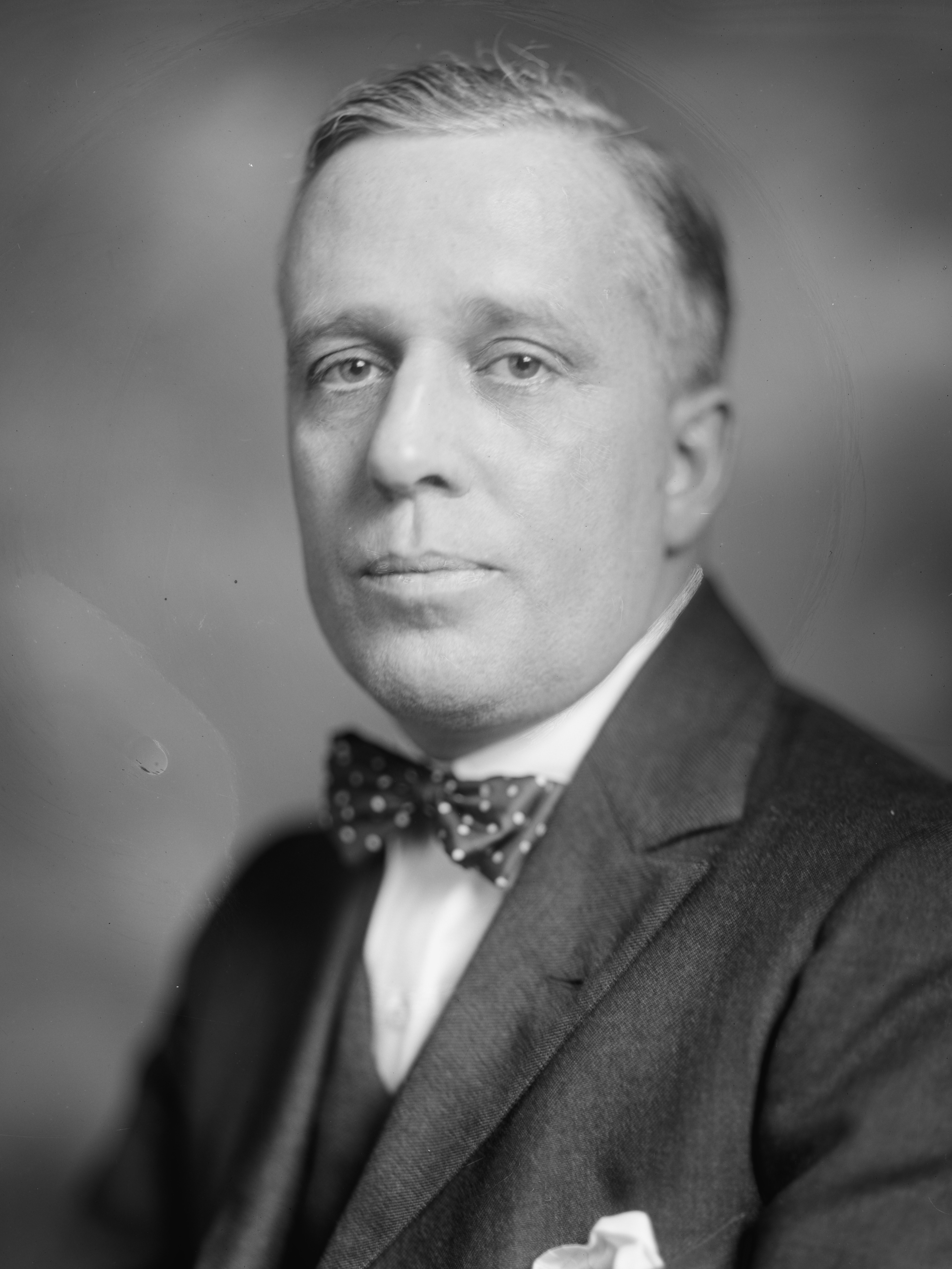
Nominee	Smith W. Brookhart	Daniel F. Steck
Party	Republican	Democratic
Alliance	Progressive
Popular vote	447,706	446,951
Percentage	49.95%	49.87%
- Brookhart: 50–60% 60–70% 70–80% Steck: 50–60% 60–70%
U.S. senator before election
Smith W. Brookhart
Republican
Elected U.S. Senator
Smith W. Brookhart*
Republican

Republican primary results by county Brookhart: 50–60%; 60–70%; 70–80%; Sweet: 50–60%; 60–70%; 70–80%; 80–90%

The 1924 United States Senate election in Iowa took place on November 4, 1924. Incumbent Republican Senator Smith W. Brookhart ran for re-election to a full term in office against Democrat Daniel F. Steck.

In the initial vote, Brookhart was certified as the victor over Steck. However, Steck became the first person to successfully challenge a popular election to the Senate in 1926, when the Senate voted to remove Brookhart from office and seat Steck in his place.

== Republican primary ==
=== Candidates ===
- Smith W. Brookhart, incumbent senator since 1922
- Burton E. Sweet, former U.S. representative from Waverly and candidate for Senate in 1922

=== Results ===
1924 Republican U.S. Senate primary
Party	Candidate	Votes	%
Republican	Smith W. Brookhart (incumbent)	199,828	55.01%
Republican	Burton E. Sweet	163,413	44.99%
Total votes		363,241	100.00%

== Democratic primary ==
=== Candidates ===
- John D. Denison, candidate for U.S. representative in 1910
- Charles Rollin Keyes, geologist, ornithologist, and candidate for U.S. Senate in 1918
- Daniel F. Steck, commander of the Iowa American Legion

=== Results ===
1924 Democratic U.S. Senate primary
Party	Candidate	Votes	%
Democratic	Daniel F. Steck	21,318	38.98%
Democratic	John D. Denison	19,738	36.09%
Democratic	Charles R. Keyes	13,639	24.94%
Total votes		54,695	100.00%

== General election ==
=== Campaign ===
Brookhart, though nominally a Republican, had alienated most of the national and state party establishment by 1924. As early as 1920, he had rankled senior Republicans with his courting of blue-collar union voters and his primary challenge to senior Senator Albert B. Cummins. In 1924, he demanded the withdrawal of vice presidential nominee Charles Dawes and declined to support President Calvin Coolidge for re-election, though he did not outright endorse Progressive Robert M. La Follette.

During the campaign, the Republican State Central Committee withdrew support from Brookhart and one Republican organization went so far as to distribute sample ballots showing a 'x' in the Republican column with another 'x' next to Steck's name.

By October, all but one of the state's Republican daily newspapers had endorsed Steck.

=== Results ===
On the day of the election, some newspapers reported that Steck had won. However, two days later, rural districts gave Brookhart a small lead. His victory was certified and he was seated for a full term as senator.

1924 U.S. Senate election in Iowa
Party	Candidate	Votes	%	±%
Republican	Smith W. Brookhart (incumbent)	447,706	49.95%	▼13.16
Democratic	Daniel F. Steck	446,951	49.87%	▲12.98
Independent Republican	Luther Brewer	1,124	0.13%	N/A
Independent	L.E. Eickelberg	535	0.06%	N/A
Total votes		896,316	100.00%	

== Aftermath and reversal ==
After the election, the Senate Republicans retaliated by stripping Brookhart, LaFollette, and two other progressive Republicans of their committee appointments and excluding them from the party conference.

=== Challenges ===
In January, Steck served notice of his intention to challenge Brookhart's inauguration for the new term on the grounds of election fraud. The Iowa Republican Party also challenged Brookhart's election on the grounds that he was not a Republican.

Brookhart was sworn into office on March 4, 1925, without incident. On March 10, the Senate referred both challenges to the Committee on Privileges and Elections.

Steck's challenge alleged that thousands of ballots were unlawfully counted for Brookhart while many of his own were discarded or altered.

The Iowa Republican challenge alleged that Brookhart had fraudulently represented himself as a party member until the filing deadline, and then toured the state supporting the principles and candidates of the Progressive Party. The state committee argued that Republicans had in good faith voted for a person they assumed to be a regular party member, and that Brookhart had therefore committed election fraud.

=== Investigation and recount ===
A subcommittee of two Republicans and two Democrats commenced the investigation of the case on July 20, 1925. By agreement of Brookhart and Steck, all of the more than 900,000 ballots were transported from Iowa to Washington for a recount.

A number of disputed ballots had evidently attempted to replicate local newspaper endorsements for Steck by drawing an arrow pointing to the box marked for Steck; these ballots had been excluded from the original count under an Iowa law banning extraneous markings but were counted by the subcommittee on the grounds that it was clear what the voter had meant. Some ballots arrived in Washington with broken seals, and there were discrepancies between the voter rolls and the number of ballots received.

On March 29, 1926, the committee issued its report finding that Steck had received a plurality of 1,420 votes and should be seated. In a minority report, Senator Hubert D. Stephens protested that some ballots had not been properly examined and secured, that 3,500 fewer ballots were received than cast, and that the majority did not count 1,300 properly marked straight Republican ballots for Brookhart.

=== Senate debate and vote ===
In the debate before the whole Senate, speeches focused on the conflict between Iowa state election law and the federal recount. Brookhart's supporters maintained that there was no precedent for overruling state election laws in reviewing contested elections.

On April 12, the Senate voted 45 to 41 to unseat Brookhart and seat Steck.

Vote to adopt the majority report
April 12, 1926	Party			Total votes
April 12, 1926	Democratic	Farmer-Labor	Republican	Total votes
Yea	29	0	16	45
Nay	9	1	31	41
Not voting	1	0	9	10
Roll call vote on the report: Senator / Party / State / Vote; Henry F. Ashurst / D / Arizona / Nay; Thomas Bayard / D / Delaware / Yea; Hiram Bingham III / R / Connecticut / Nay; Cole Blease / D / South Carolina / Nay; William Borah / R / Idaho / Nay; Sam G. Bratton / D / New Mexico / Yea; Smith W. Brookhart / R / Iowa / Not voting; Edwin S. Broussard / D / Louisiana / Yea; William Cabell Bruce / D / Maryland / Yea; William M. Butler / R / Massachusetts / Yea; Ralph H. Cameron / R / Arizona / Nay; Arthur Capper / R / Kansas / Nay; Thaddeus H. Caraway / D / Arkansas / Yea; Royal S. Copeland / D / New York / Yea; James J. Couzens / R / Michigan / Nay; Albert B. Cummins / R / Iowa / Not voting; Charles Curtis / R / Kansas / Nay; Porter H. Dale / R / Vermont / Yea; Charles S. Deneen / R / Illinois / Yea; Clarence Dill / D / Washington / Nay; T. Coleman du Pont / R / Delaware / Not voting (Note: Supported seating Steck. Paired with Shortridge.); Walter Evans Edge / R / New Jersey / Nay; Edward I. Edwards / D / New Jersey / Yea; Richard P. Ernst / R / Kentucky / Yea; Bert Fernald / R / Maine / Nay; Woodbridge N. Ferris / D / Michigan / Nay; Simeon D. Fess / R / Ohio / Not voting (Note: Opposed seating Steck. Paired with McKinley.); Duncan U. Fletcher / D / Florida / Yea; Lynn Frazier / R / North Dakota / Nay; Walter F. George / D / Georgia / Yea; Peter G. Gerry / D / Rhode Island / Yea; Carter Glass / D / Virginia / Yea; Guy D. Goff / R / West Virginia / Yea; Frank R. Gooding / R / Idaho / Nay; Frank L. Greene / R / Vermont / Yea; Frederick Hale / R / Maine / Nay; John W. Harreld / R / Oklahoma / Yea; William J. Harris / D / Georgia / Yea; Pat Harrison / D / Mississippi / Yea; J. Thomas Heflin / D / Alabama / Yea; Robert B. Howell / R / Nebraska / Nay; Hiram Johnson / R / California / Nay; Andrieus A. Jones / D / New Mexico / Yea; Wesley L. Jones / R / Washington / Nay; John B. Kendrick / D / Wyoming / Yea; Henry W. Keyes / R / New Hampshire / Yea; William H. King / D / Utah / Yea; Irvine Lenroot / R / Wisconsin / Nay; Earle B. Mayfield / D / Texas / Yea; Kenneth McKellar / D / Tennessee / Yea; William B. McKinley / R / Illinois / Not voting (Note: Supported seating Steck. Paired with Fess.); George P. McLean / R / Connecticut / Yea; William H. McMaster / R / South Dakota / Nay; Charles L. McNary / R / Oregon / Yea; Rice W. Means / R / Colorado / Not voting (Note: Supported seating Steck. Paired with Schall.); Jesse H. Metcalf / R / Rhode Island / Nay; George H. Moses / R / New Hampshire / Nay; Matthew M. Neely / D / West Virginia / Yea; Peter Norbeck / R / South Dakota / Nay; George W. Norris / R / Nebraska / Nay; Gerald Nye / R / North Dakota / Nay; Tasker Oddie / R / Nevada / Nay; Lee S. Overman / D / North Carolina / Yea; George W. Pepper / R / Pennsylvania / Nay; Lawrence C. Phipps / R / Colorado / Yea; William B. Pine / R / Oklahoma / Nay; Key Pittman / D / Nevada / Yea; Joseph E. Ransdell / D / Louisiana / Nay; David A. Reed / R / Pennsylvania / Nay; James A. Reed / D / Missouri / Nay; Joseph T. Robinson / D / Arkansas / Yea; Arthur R. Robinson / R / Indiana / Yea; Frederic M. Sackett / R / Kentucky / Yea; Thomas D. Schall / R / Minnesota / Not voting (Note: Opposed seating Steck. Paired with Means.); Morris Sheppard / D / Texas / Yea; Henrik Shipstead / F-L / Minnesota / Nay; Samuel M. Shortridge / R / California / Not voting (Note: Opposed seating Steck. Paired with du Pont.); Furnifold M. Simmons / D / North Carolina / Yea; Ellison D. Smith / D / South Carolina / Yea; Reed Smoot / R / Utah / Nay; Robert N. Stanfield / R / Oregon / Nay; Hubert D. Stephens / D / Mississippi / Nay; Claude A. Swanson / D / Virginia / Yea; Park Trammell / D / Florida / Yea; Lawrence Tyson / D / Tennessee / Yea; Oscar Underwood / D / Alabama / Not voting (Note: Favored seating Steck. Paired with Wadsworth.); James W. Wadsworth / R / New York / Not voting (Note: Opposed seating Steck. Paired with Underwood.); Thomas J. Walsh / D / Montana / Nay; Francis E. Warren / R / Wyoming / Yea; James E. Watson / R / Indiana / Yea; Ovington Weller / R / Maryland / Yea; Burton K. Wheeler / D / Montana / Nay; George Howard Williams / R / Missouri / Nay; Frank B. Willis / R / Ohio / Nay

=== Aftermath ===
Steck became the first Democrat to represent Iowa in the Senate since 1859. He served out the remainder of that term which ultimately became his. He was soundly defeated for re-election in 1930, the only incumbent Democrat in the country to lose in that cycle. Though they gained eight seats nationwide, Steck's loss cost Democrats control of the Senate.

Brookhart ran for Senate again in 1926 and unseated Senator Cummins, who died shortly after the primary. He served until 1933, when he was defeated by Henry Field in the Republican primary. Brookhart ran in the 1932 general election as a Progressive, but finished a distant third behind Field and the Democratic victor, Richard L. Murphy.

== See also ==
- 1924 United States Senate elections
