= 1944 United States Senate election in Iowa =

- November 7, 1944
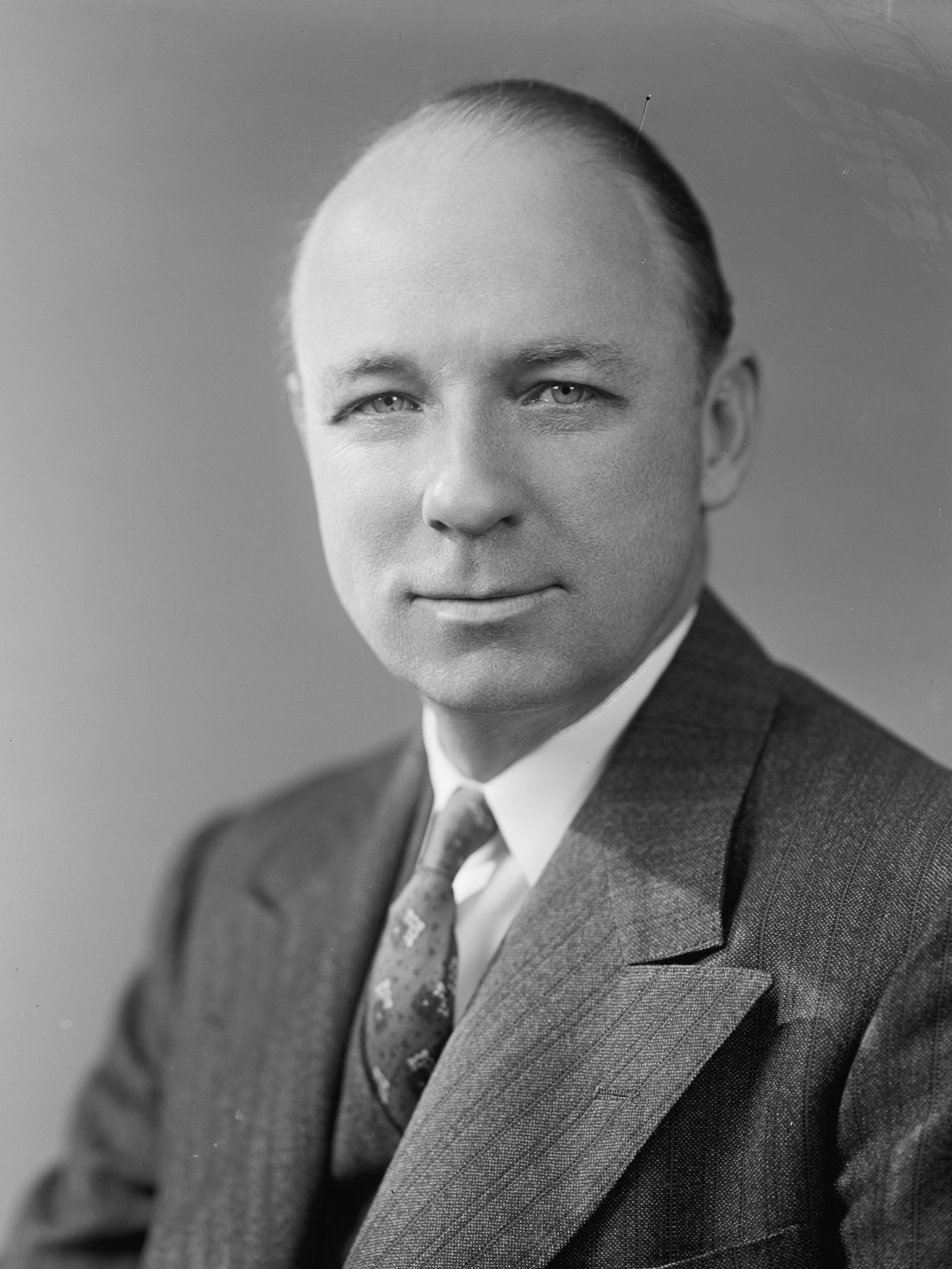

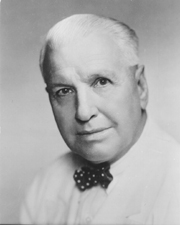
Nominee	Bourke B. Hickenlooper	Guy M. Gillette
Party	Republican	Democratic
Popular vote	523,963	494,229
Percentage	51.28%	48.37%
- County results Hickenlooper: 40–50% 50–60% 60–70% Gillette: 40–50% 50–60%
U.S. senator before election
Guy M. Gillette
Democratic
Elected U.S. Senator
Bourke B. Hickenlooper
Republican

The 1944 United States Senate election in Iowa took place on November 7, 1944. Incumbent Democratic Senator Guy M. Gillette ran for a second full term in office but was defeated by Republican Governor Bourke B. Hickenlooper.

Primary elections were held on June 5.

Gillette would be elected to Iowa's other Senate seat four years later and the two men would serve together as colleagues from 1949 to 1955.

== Democratic primary ==
=== Candidates ===
- Guy M. Gillette, incumbent Senator since 1936
- Ernest J. Seemann, perennial candidate

=== Results ===
1944 Democratic U.S. Senate primary
Party	Candidate	Votes	%
Democratic	Guy M. Gillette (incumbent)	36,923	82.93%
Democratic	Ernest J. Seemann	7,598	17.07%
Total votes		44,521	100.00%

== General election ==
=== Candidates ===
- Bourke B. Hickenlooper, Governor of Iowa (Republican)
- W.S. Bowden (Prohibition)
- Guy M. Gillette, incumbent Senator since 1936 (Democratic)
- C.W. Drescher (Socialist)

=== Results ===
1944 U.S. Senate election in Iowa
Party	Candidate	Votes	%	±%
Republican	Bourke B. Hickenlooper	523,963	51.28%	▲1.87
Democratic	Guy M. Gillette (incumbent)	494,229	48.37%	▼1.37
Prohibition	W.S. Bowden	2,751	0.27%	▲0.17
Socialist	C.W. Drescher	744	0.07%	N/A
Total votes		1,021,687	100.00%	

== See also ==
- 1944 United States Senate elections
