= 1954 United States Senate election in Iowa =

- November 2, 1954

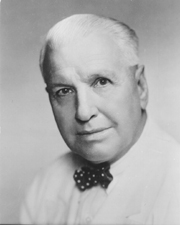
Nominee	Thomas E. Martin	Guy Gillette
Party	Republican	Democratic
Popular vote	442,409	402,712
Percentage	52.21%	47.53%
- County results Martin: 50–60% 60–70% 70–80% Gillette: 50–60% 60–70% Tie: 40–50%
U.S. senator before election
Guy Gillette
Democratic
Elected U.S. Senator
Thomas E. Martin
Republican

The 1954 United States Senate election in Iowa took place on November 2, 1954. Incumbent Democratic Senator Guy Gillette ran for re-election but was defeated in an upset by Republican U.S. Representative Thomas E. Martin.

This was the fifth consecutive election in which the incumbent lost and this seat changed parties.

== General election ==
=== Candidates ===
- Guy Gillette, incumbent Senator (Democratic)
- Thomas E. Martin, U.S. Representative from Des Moines (Republican)
- Ernest J. Seemann, perennial candidate (Republicsons)

=== Results ===
1954 U.S. Senate election in Iowa
Party	Candidate	Votes	%	±%
Republican	Thomas E. Martin	442,409	52.21%	▲10.65
Democratic	Guy Gillette (incumbent)	402,712	47.53%	▼10.27
Republicsons	Ernest J. Seemann	2,234	0.26%	N/A
Total votes		847,355	100.00%	

== See also ==
- 1954 United States Senate elections
