= Thomas E. Martin =

American politician (1893–1971)

Thomas Ellsworth Martin
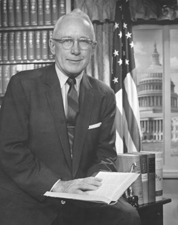

United States Senator from Iowa
- In office January 3, 1955 – January 3, 1961
- Preceded by: Guy Gillette
- Succeeded by: Jack Miller

Member of the U.S. House of Representatives from Iowa's 1st district
- In office January 3, 1939 – January 3, 1955
- Preceded by: Edward C. Eicher
- Succeeded by: Fred Schwengel

Mayor of Iowa City
- In office 1935–1937
- Preceded by: John Carroll
- Succeeded by: Myron Walker

Personal details
- Born: January 18, 1893 Melrose, Iowa, U.S.
- Died: June 27, 1971 (aged 78) Seattle, Washington, U.S.
- Resting place: Willamette National Cemetery
- Party: Republican
- Education: University of Iowa; Columbia University

Military service
- Allegiance: United States
- Branch/service: United States Army
- Rank: First lieutenant
- Unit: U.S. 35th Infantry
- Battles/wars: World War I

Thomas Ellsworth Martin (January 18, 1893 – June 27, 1971) was an American politician who served as a United States representative (1939–1955) and senator (1955–1961) from Iowa. A Republican, he served in Congress for 22 consecutive years.

== Early life ==
Martin was born in Melrose, Iowa, on January 18, 1893. He attended the public schools. He graduated from the State University of Iowa in 1916 and from its College of Law in 1927. He received his LL.M. from Columbia Law School in 1928.

He was then a sales analyst and accountant for a rubber company in Akron, Ohio, and Dallas, Texas, in 1916 and 1917. During the First World War he served as a first lieutenant with the Thirty-fifth Infantry, United States Army, from 1917 to 1919. After the war, he continued work in the rubber industry.

== Career ==
Martin became an assistant professor of military science and tactics at the University of Iowa from 1921 to 1923. Martin was admitted to the Iowa bar in 1927 and commenced practice in Iowa City, of which he served as city solicitor from 1933 to 1935 and mayor from 1935 to 1937. In 1938, Martin was elected as a Republican to the U.S. House of Representatives, serving Iowa's 1st congressional district. He was re-elected to the House seven consecutive times, serving from January 3, 1939, to January 3, 1955.

In 1954, instead of running again for the House, Martin ran for the U.S. Senate. He defeated incumbent Senator Guy Gillette of the Democratic Party, who was then completing his second full term in the Senate. For the first time since 1924, both of Iowa's senators, and all of its representatives, were Republicans. Martin served from January 3, 1955, to January 3, 1961. Martin voted in favor of the Civil Rights Acts of 1957 and 1960. He retired after one term.

== Personal life ==
After he retired, Martin moved to Seattle, Washington, where he died in June 1971.

Party political offices
Preceded by George A. Wilson	Republican nominee for United States Senator from Iowa (Class 2); 1954	Succeeded by Jack Miller
U.S. House of Representatives
Preceded by Edward C. Eicher	Member of the U.S. House of Representatives from Iowa's 1st congressional district 1939–1955	Succeeded by Fred Schwengel
U.S. Senate
Preceded by Guy Mark Gillette	U.S. senator (Class 2) from Iowa; 1955–1961; Served alongside: Bourke B. Hickenlooper	Succeeded by Jack Miller
