= Florence Brookhart Yount =

- Born: Florence Hercune Brookhart; March 5, 1909; Washington, Iowa
- Died: November 25, 1988 (aged 79)
- Education: George Washington University
- Known for: obstetrician and pediatrician
- Father: Smith W. Brookhart

Florence "Pat" Brookhart Yount ( March 5, 1909 - November 25, 1988) was an obstetrician, pediatrician, and community leader from Prescott, Arizona. She was the first female physician in the community.

== Early life ==
Florence Hercune Brookhart was born on March 5, 1909, in Washington, Iowa to Smith W. Brookhart and Jennie (née Hercune) Brookhart. She was one of seven children.

In 1922, Smith Brookhart was elected to the United States Senate, so the family moved to Washington, D.C. While there, Brookhart attended George Washington University and medical school. She attended medical school despite her father's reluctance due to fears that the life of a doctor would be too difficult. In 1935, Brookhart graduated as one of five women in a class of eighty-eight.

While at medical school, Brookhart met her future husband, C. E. “Ned” Yount Jr., who was planning to join his father's practice in Prescott. After finishing their internships in Wash

ington, D.C., Yount returned to Prescott to practice with his father, and Brookhart went to Chicago to complete a residency in pediatrics. When Brookhart completed her residency, she married Yount on June 22, 1936.

== Medical career ==
Once she was licensed to practice medicine in Arizona, Florence Brookhart Yount joined her husband and father-in-law's practice. Shortly after joining the practice, Yount realized the state did not have a well-baby clinic, but had a high infant mortality rate. Yount created a well-baby clinic in Prescott at an existing medical clinic. After a year, the county physician credited for the achievement of no children dying during the summer.

During World War II, as the younger doctors went to war, Yount played a large role in the medical community. As the local hospital burned down in 1940, Yount did most of her work, including deliveries, in her office.

== Activism and political work ==
Yount led the effort to reopen a Prescott community hospital in the unused Jefferson School. She gathered items to fund the creation and persuaded retired nurses to return to work. The Prescott Community Hospital opened on March 1, 1943, and Yount delivered the first baby there that evening.

When the hospital's expansion exceeded the available space, Yount led the medical community in lobbying Prescott to build a new hospital. Yount also participated in county, state, and national medical societies, worked to bring Blue Cross Blue Shield Association to Arizona, and helped organize Yavapai County's polio campaign.

In 1949, Yount joined the State Public Welfare Board, dealing with political issues and limited funds in the distribution of grants.

== Personal life ==
The Younts had one son.

Yount was a member of the founding group of the Methodist Artists Guild and contributed to it as a pastelist. She was also a "rock hounder," collecting geological specimens.

Yount was interested in history. She researched the history of Prescott's hospitals and territorial medicine and wrote a history of the Methodists in Prescott. She was also a member of the Sharlot Hall Museum and was part of the effort to establish the museum's Territorial Women's Memorial Rose Garden. She also helped in the creation of the Fremont House.

== Retirement and death ==
In 1973, the Younts retired. Florence Brookhart Yount died on November 25, 1988.

In 1990, Yount was posthumously inducted into the Arizona Women's Hall of Fame.
