= Guy Gillette =

American politician (1879–1973)

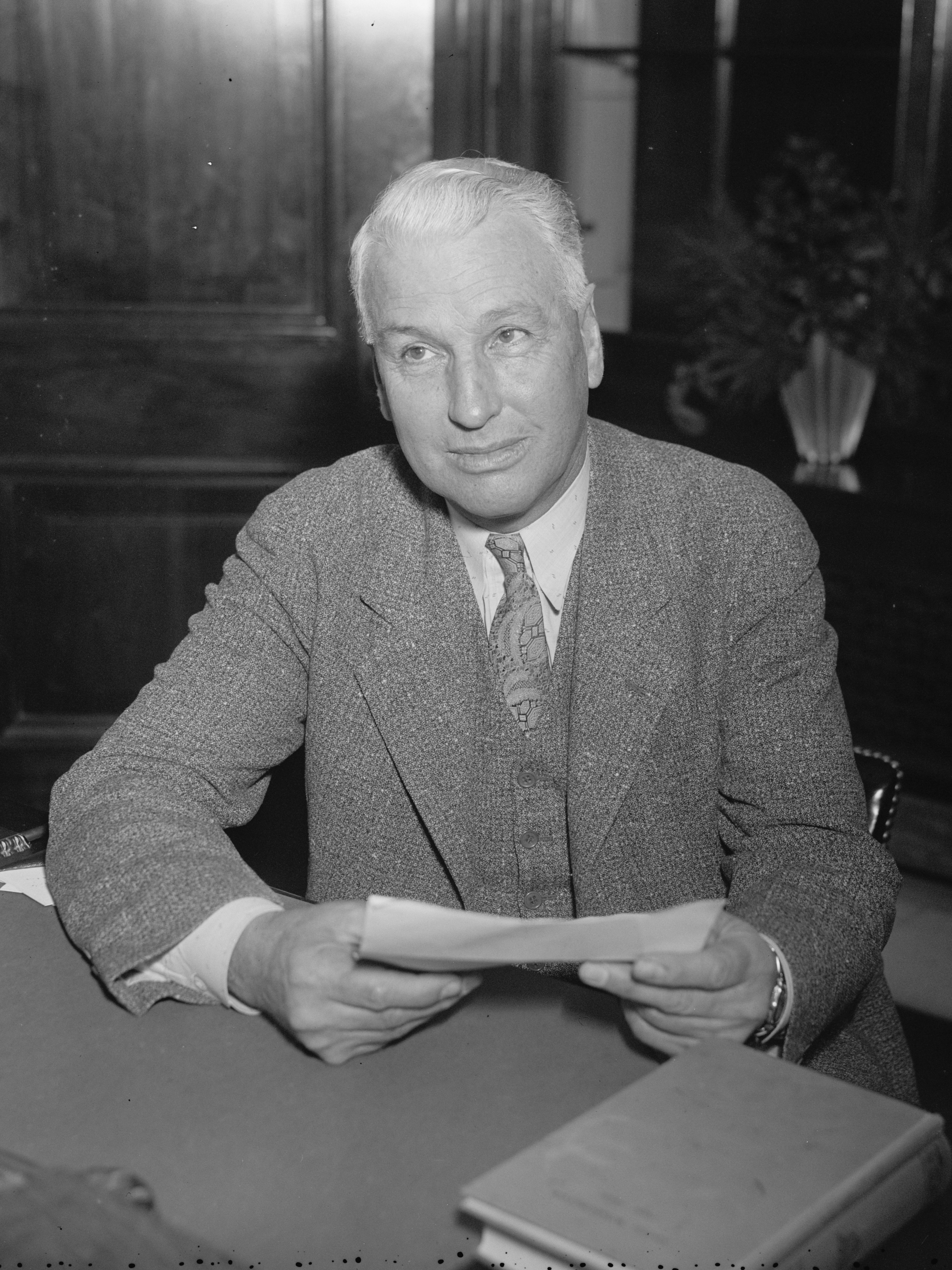

United States Senator from Iowa
- In office January 3, 1949 – January 3, 1955
- Preceded by: George A. Wilson
- Succeeded by: Thomas E. Martin
- In office November 4, 1936 – January 3, 1945
- Preceded by: Richard L. Murphy
- Succeeded by: Bourke B. Hickenlooper

Member of the U.S. House of Representatives from Iowa's 9th district
- In office March 4, 1933 – November 3, 1936
- Preceded by: Ed H. Campbell (redistricting)
- Succeeded by: Vincent F. Harrington

Member of the Iowa Senate
- In office January 13, 1913 – January 7, 1917
- Constituency: 46th district

Personal details
- Born: Guy Mark Gillette; February 3, 1879 Cherokee, Iowa, U.S.
- Died: March 3, 1973 (aged 94) Cherokee, Iowa, U.S.
- Party: Democratic
- Spouse: Rose Freeman (m. 1907)
- Children: 1 son
- Education: Drake University Law School

Military service
- Allegiance: United States
- Branch/service: United States Army
- Rank: Captain
- Unit: 52nd Iowa Infantry Regiment
- Battles/wars: Spanish–American War; World War I

Guy Mark Gillette (February 3, 1879 – March 3, 1973) was an American lawyer and politician who served as a Democratic Party U.S. representative (1933–1936) and senator (1936–1945; 1949–1955) from Iowa. Gillette was elected to the U.S. Senate, re-elected, defeated, elected again, and defeated again.

== Personal background ==
Born in Cherokee, Iowa, he attended public school and graduated from Drake University Law School in Des Moines in 1900. He was admitted to the bar in 1900 and commenced practice in Cherokee. During the Spanish–American War, he served as a sergeant in the Fifty-second Iowa Regiment in the United States Army, but never saw combat. He volunteered to fight alongside the Boers in the Second Boer War (1898–1902), but was turned down.

Returning to Iowa, he engaged in agricultural pursuits and was the city attorney of Cherokee in 1906–1907. He became the prosecuting attorney of Cherokee County from 1907 to 1909 and a member of the Iowa State Senate from 1912 to 1916.

During the First World War, he served as a captain in the United States Army. He ran unsuccessfully for Iowa State Auditor in 1918, and returned to Cherokee to farm.

== Service in the U.S. House, then U.S. Senate (1933–1945) ==
In 1932, in the Roosevelt landslide, he was elected as a Democrat to represent Iowa's 9th congressional district, in heavily Republican northwest Iowa. He was easily re-elected in 1934, and served nearly all of that term. He resigned upon his election to the United States Senate on November 3, 1936, to serve out the remainder of the term of Senator Richard Louis Murphy, who had died in an auto accident. Nearly two years remained in Murphy's term, which would end January 3, 1939. Although he generally supported the New Deal, he opposed the new wage and hours bill, a new farm bill, and aspects of the Social Security system.

In 1938 the Roosevelt administration targeted Gillette for replacement because of Gillette's vote against Roosevelt's plan to expand the Supreme Court and other positions. He nevertheless defeated Roosevelt's choice for the Democratic nomination, Congressman Otha D. Wearin, and was re-elected to his first full Senate term by 2,805 votes. During that term, his conflicts with the Roosevelt administration expanded, on topics as diverse as the terms of the Neutrality Act, Roosevelt's pursuit of third and fourth terms, and choices for judgeships.

After the Japanese attack on Pearl Harbor (where, coincidentally, Gillette's brother Captain Claude Gillette managed the Navy yard), Gillette became "more of an internationalist". Nevertheless, he used his chairmanship on a Senate subcommittee to aggressively challenge the Roosevelt administration's failure to prepare for the prospect of a Japanese seizure of the source of the nation's rubber imports by developing synthetic farm-based alternatives. In April 1943 a confidential analysis by British scholar Isaiah Berlin of the Senate Foreign Relations Committee for the Foreign Office succinctly characterized Gillette:

[He] resembles Van Nuys in that he is a typical Mid-Western Senator with a moderately steady Isolationist voting record, although he is not an articulate opponent of the Administration's policy. Unlike Van Nuys, he is a supporter of reciprocal trade pacts but shares his suspicion of the President. A simple, confused, but very honest Presbyterian of considerable character, he views the corn interest, which he represents, with an almost religious devotion. He leads the Senate Lobby interested in producing synthetic rubber out of corn, and coming from the Republican corn belt, is virtually a Republican in sentiment and conduct. He is not at all anti-British, but as isolationist as his general environment. His speeches in Congress take the form of thinking aloud. On foreign policy he is not a bigoted anti-Rooseveltite but is exceedingly uncertain.

Like several others who had opposed Roosevelt's efforts to aid the United Kingdom before Pearl Harbor but faced wartime elections, Gillette lost his seat in 1944, to Republican Governor Bourke Hickenlooper by 29,734 votes.

== Between terms ==
Within days of Gillette's first defeat, Roosevelt nominated him as the chairman of the three-member Surplus Property Board, prompting The Washington Post and a Life editorial to quip that the president was confusing the problem of surplus property with the problem of surplus politicians. He took an early dislike to the job, and complained that he was often outvoted by the two other members. After resigning from the Surplus Board in May 1945, he became president of the American League for a Free Palestine, serving until the committee's work ended with the establishment of the state of Israel in 1948.

== 1948 Senate Campaign ==
In 1948, Gillette attempted a political comeback, campaigning for Iowa's other U. S. Senate seat held by former Republican Governor George Wilson, Gillette appealed to farmers, hammering home the prices of crops falling, at a campaign event with President Harry Truman who was seeking re-election himself, Truman said to the voters of Iowa “if they failed to return Guy Gillette to the U. S. Senate there was something wrong with them”.

Gillette would end up defeating Wilson by 162,448 votes, in the concurrent presidential race Truman carried Iowa en route to re-election nationwide. Gillette’s Seat was one of nine Republican senate seats that flipped to Democrats in 1948.

== Return to the Senate (1949–1955) ==
Gillette was sworn back into the Senate on January 3, 1949, In 1951, his Subcommittee on Privileges and Elections conducted an investigation of Wisconsin Senator Joseph McCarthy's campaign practices. Gillette was one of the first senators to call for a North Atlantic Assembly. In 1952, he was selected by the District of Columbia Democratic Club to chair the Barkley for President effort. Gillette served until January 3, 1955, after losing his reelection bid to U.S. Representative Thomas E. Martin by 39,697 votes. His defeat was considered an upset because it conflicted with polls. It also meant that Iowa's congressional delegation would be entirely composed of Republicans, which would not happen again until 2023.

== Post-Senate ==
Following his second defeat, Gillette initially remained on Capitol Hill, serving as counsel with the Senate Post Office and Civil Service Committee (from 1955 to 1956) and the Senate Judiciary Committee (from 1956 to 1961).

Gillette and former U.S. Senator Henry F. Ashurst had cameo appearances as U.S. Senators in the film 1962 Advise & Consent.

He retired and resided in Cherokee until his death at age 94 on March 3, 1973.

== Publications ==
- "The Forgotten Consumer." Challenge, vol. 1, no. 2 (Nov. 1952), pp. 29–33. JSTOR 40717307.
- "The Senate in Foreign Relations." Annals of the American Academy of Political and Social Science, vol. 289 (Sep. 1953), pp. 49–57. JSTOR 1028480.
- "Preparing For UN Charter Review." World Affairs, vol. 117, no. 3 (Fall 1954), pp. 67–69. JSTOR 20668925.
- "United Nations Charter Review." Proceedings of the American Society of International Law at Its Annual Meeting (1921-1969), vol. 48 (Apr. 22–24, 1954), pp. 191–211. JSTOR 25657319.

== See also ==
- Guy M. and Rose (Freeman) Gillette House in Cherokee, Iowa

== Bibliography ==
- "Gillette, Guy (Mark)." In: Current Biography, 1946: Who's News and Why. New York: H.W. Wilson (1947), pp. 207–210. ISBN 978-0824201128.
- Harrington, Jerry. "Senator Guy Gillette Foils the Execution Committee." The Palimpsest 62 (Nov./Dec. 1981), pp. 170–80

Party political offices
Preceded by Richard L. Murphy	Democratic nominee for U.S. Senator from Iowa (Class 3); 1936, 1938, 1944	Succeeded by Albert J. Loveland
Preceded by Clyde L. Herring	Democratic nominee for U.S. Senator from Iowa (Class 2); 1948, 1954	Succeeded by Herschel C. Loveless
U.S. House of Representatives
Preceded by Charles E. Swanson	Member of the U.S. House of Representatives from Iowa's 9th congressional district 1933–1936	Succeeded by Vincent F. Harrington
U.S. Senate
Preceded by Richard L. Murphy	U.S. senator (Class 3) from Iowa; 1936–1945; Served alongside: Lester J. Dickinson, Clyde L. Herring, George A. Wilson	Succeeded by Bourke B. Hickenlooper
Preceded by George A. Wilson	U.S. senator (Class 2) from Iowa; 1949–1955; Served alongside: Bourke Hickenlooper	Succeeded by Thomas E. Martin
