= List of United States senators from Iowa =

Current delegation

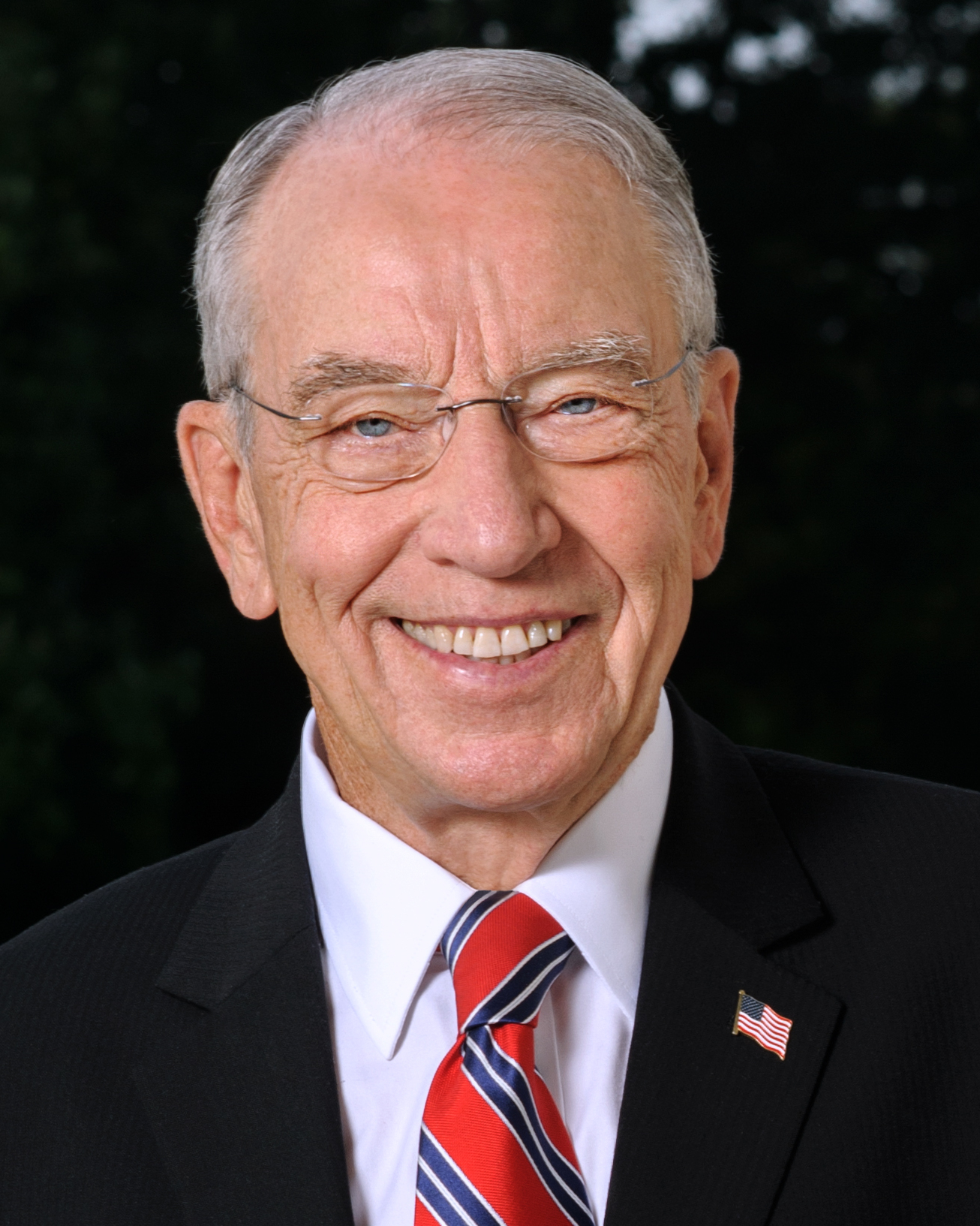
Chuck Grassley (R)

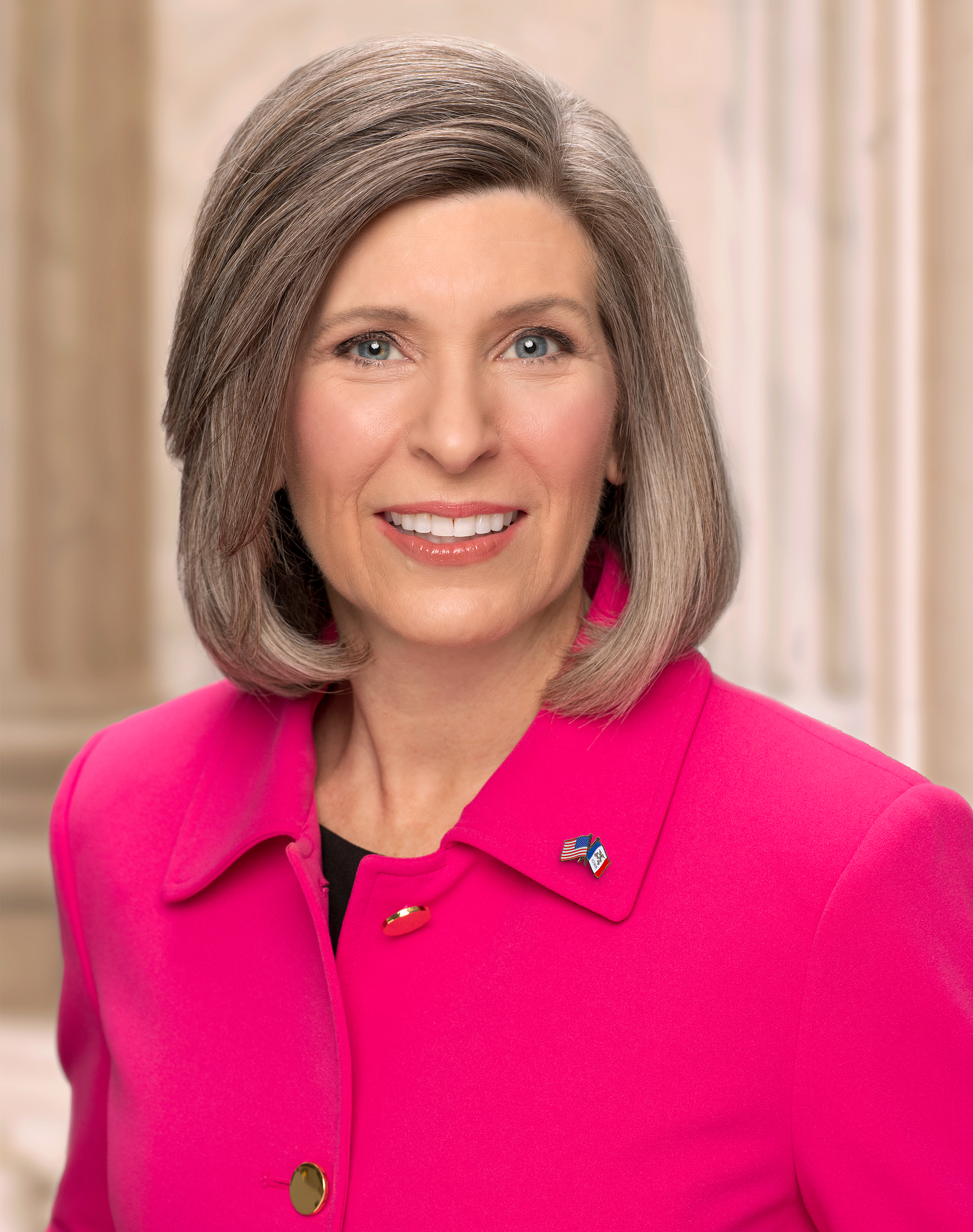
Joni Ernst (R)

(ordered by seniority)

Iowa was admitted to the Union on December 28, 1846, and elects United States senators to class 2 and class 3. The state's current U.S. senators are Republicans Chuck Grassley (serving since 1981) and Joni Ernst (serving since 2015). Currently on his eighth term in office, Grassley is Iowa's longest-serving senator.

== List of senators ==
Class 2 Class 2 senators belong to the electoral cycle that most recently had regular elections in 2008, 2014, 2020, and 2026. The next election will be in 2032.						C	Class 3 Class 3 senators belong to the electoral cycle that most recently had regular elections in 2004, 2010, 2016, and 2022. The next election will be in 2028.					
#	Senator	Party	Dates in office	Electoral history	T	C	T	Electoral history	Dates in office	Party	Senator	#
Vacant			Dec 28, 1846 – Dec 7, 1848	Legislature failed to elect.	—	29th	—	Legislature failed to elect.	Dec 28, 1846 – Dec 7, 1848	Vacant		
Vacant			Dec 28, 1846 – Dec 7, 1848	Legislature failed to elect.	—	30th	—	Legislature failed to elect.	Dec 28, 1846 – Dec 7, 1848	Vacant		
1	George W. Jones (Dubuque)	Democratic	Dec 7, 1848 – Mar 3, 1859	Elected in 1848.	1	30th	1	Elected in 1848.	Dec 7, 1848 – Feb 22, 1855	Democratic	Augustus C. Dodge (Burlington)	1
1	George W. Jones (Dubuque)	Democratic	Dec 7, 1848 – Mar 3, 1859	Elected in 1848.	1	31st	2	Re-elected in 1849. Resigned to become U.S. Minister to Spain, having lost re-election.	Dec 7, 1848 – Feb 22, 1855	Democratic	Augustus C. Dodge (Burlington)	1
1	George W. Jones (Dubuque)	Democratic	Dec 7, 1848 – Mar 3, 1859	Elected in 1848.	1	32nd	2	Re-elected in 1849. Resigned to become U.S. Minister to Spain, having lost re-election.	Dec 7, 1848 – Feb 22, 1855	Democratic	Augustus C. Dodge (Burlington)	1
1	George W. Jones (Dubuque)	Democratic	Dec 7, 1848 – Mar 3, 1859	Re-elected in 1852. Lost renomination.	2	33rd	2	Re-elected in 1849. Resigned to become U.S. Minister to Spain, having lost re-election.	Dec 7, 1848 – Feb 22, 1855	Democratic	Augustus C. Dodge (Burlington)	1
1	George W. Jones (Dubuque)	Democratic	Dec 7, 1848 – Mar 3, 1859	Re-elected in 1852. Lost renomination.	2	33rd	2		Feb 22, 1855 – Mar 3, 1855	Vacant		
1	George W. Jones (Dubuque)	Democratic	Dec 7, 1848 – Mar 3, 1859	Re-elected in 1852. Lost renomination.	2	34th	3	Elected in 1855. Elected invalidated, as the Iowa Senate had not participated in it.	Mar 4, 1855 – Jan 5, 1857	Free Soil	James Harlan (Mount Pleasant)	2
1	George W. Jones (Dubuque)	Democratic	Dec 7, 1848 – Mar 3, 1859	Re-elected in 1852. Lost renomination.	2	34th	3		Jan 5, 1857 – Jan 29, 1857	Vacant		2
1	George W. Jones (Dubuque)	Democratic	Dec 7, 1848 – Mar 3, 1859	Re-elected in 1852. Lost renomination.	2	34th	3	Re-elected to finish his vacant term.	Jan 29, 1857 – May 15, 1865	Republican	James Harlan (Mount Pleasant)	2
1	George W. Jones (Dubuque)	Democratic	Dec 7, 1848 – Mar 3, 1859	Re-elected in 1852. Lost renomination.	2	35th	3	Re-elected to finish his vacant term.	Jan 29, 1857 – May 15, 1865	Republican	James Harlan (Mount Pleasant)	2
2	James W. Grimes (Burlington)	Republican	Mar 4, 1859 – Dec 6, 1869	Elected in 1858.	3	36th	3	Re-elected to finish his vacant term.	Jan 29, 1857 – May 15, 1865	Republican	James Harlan (Mount Pleasant)	2
2	James W. Grimes (Burlington)	Republican	Mar 4, 1859 – Dec 6, 1869	Elected in 1858.	3	37th	4	Re-elected in 1860. Resigned to become U.S. Secretary of the Interior.	Jan 29, 1857 – May 15, 1865	Republican	James Harlan (Mount Pleasant)	2
2	James W. Grimes (Burlington)	Republican	Mar 4, 1859 – Dec 6, 1869	Elected in 1858.	3	38th	4	Re-elected in 1860. Resigned to become U.S. Secretary of the Interior.	Jan 29, 1857 – May 15, 1865	Republican	James Harlan (Mount Pleasant)	2
2	James W. Grimes (Burlington)	Republican	Mar 4, 1859 – Dec 6, 1869	Re-elected in 1864. Resigned due to ill health.	4	39th	4	Re-elected in 1860. Resigned to become U.S. Secretary of the Interior.	Jan 29, 1857 – May 15, 1865	Republican	James Harlan (Mount Pleasant)	2
2	James W. Grimes (Burlington)	Republican	Mar 4, 1859 – Dec 6, 1869	Re-elected in 1864. Resigned due to ill health.	4	39th	4		May 15, 1865 – Jan 13, 1866	Vacant		
2	James W. Grimes (Burlington)	Republican	Mar 4, 1859 – Dec 6, 1869	Re-elected in 1864. Resigned due to ill health.	4	39th	4	Elected to finish Harlan's term. Lost nomination for the next term.	Jan 13, 1866 – Mar 3, 1867	Republican	Samuel J. Kirkwood (Iowa City)	3
2	James W. Grimes (Burlington)	Republican	Mar 4, 1859 – Dec 6, 1869	Re-elected in 1864. Resigned due to ill health.	4	40th	5	Elected in 1866. Lost re-election.	Mar 4, 1867 – Mar 3, 1873	Republican	James Harlan (Mount Pleasant)	4
2	James W. Grimes (Burlington)	Republican	Mar 4, 1859 – Dec 6, 1869	Re-elected in 1864. Resigned due to ill health.	4	41st	5	Elected in 1866. Lost re-election.	Mar 4, 1867 – Mar 3, 1873	Republican	James Harlan (Mount Pleasant)	4
Vacant			Dec 6, 1869 – Jan 18, 1870		4	41st	5	Elected in 1866. Lost re-election.	Mar 4, 1867 – Mar 3, 1873	Republican	James Harlan (Mount Pleasant)	4
3	James B. Howell (Keokuk)	Republican	Jan 18, 1870 – Mar 3, 1871	Elected to finish Grimes's term. Retired.	4	41st	5	Elected in 1866. Lost re-election.	Mar 4, 1867 – Mar 3, 1873	Republican	James Harlan (Mount Pleasant)	4
4	George G. Wright (Des Moines)	Republican	Mar 4, 1871 – Mar 3, 1877	Elected in 1870. Retired.	5	42nd	5	Elected in 1866. Lost re-election.	Mar 4, 1867 – Mar 3, 1873	Republican	James Harlan (Mount Pleasant)	4
4	George G. Wright (Des Moines)	Republican	Mar 4, 1871 – Mar 3, 1877	Elected in 1870. Retired.	5	43rd	6	Elected in 1872.	Mar 4, 1873 – Aug 4, 1908	Republican	William B. Allison (Dubuque)	5
4	George G. Wright (Des Moines)	Republican	Mar 4, 1871 – Mar 3, 1877	Elected in 1870. Retired.	5	44th	6	Elected in 1872.	Mar 4, 1873 – Aug 4, 1908	Republican	William B. Allison (Dubuque)	5
5	Samuel J. Kirkwood (Iowa City)	Republican	Mar 4, 1877 – Mar 7, 1881	Elected in 1876 or 1877. Resigned to become U.S. Secretary of the Interior.	6	45th	6	Elected in 1872.	Mar 4, 1873 – Aug 4, 1908	Republican	William B. Allison (Dubuque)	5
5	Samuel J. Kirkwood (Iowa City)	Republican	Mar 4, 1877 – Mar 7, 1881	Elected in 1876 or 1877. Resigned to become U.S. Secretary of the Interior.	6	46th	7	Re-elected in 1878.	Mar 4, 1873 – Aug 4, 1908	Republican	William B. Allison (Dubuque)	5
5	Samuel J. Kirkwood (Iowa City)	Republican	Mar 4, 1877 – Mar 7, 1881	Elected in 1876 or 1877. Resigned to become U.S. Secretary of the Interior.	6	47th	7	Re-elected in 1878.	Mar 4, 1873 – Aug 4, 1908	Republican	William B. Allison (Dubuque)	5
6	James W. McDill (Afton)	Republican	Mar 8, 1881 – Mar 3, 1883	Appointed to continue Kirkwood's term. Elected in 1882 to finish Kirkwood's term. Retired.	6	47th	7	Re-elected in 1878.	Mar 4, 1873 – Aug 4, 1908	Republican	William B. Allison (Dubuque)	5
7	James F. Wilson (Fairfield)	Republican	Mar 4, 1883 – Mar 3, 1895	Elected in 1882.	7	48th	7	Re-elected in 1878.	Mar 4, 1873 – Aug 4, 1908	Republican	William B. Allison (Dubuque)	5
7	James F. Wilson (Fairfield)	Republican	Mar 4, 1883 – Mar 3, 1895	Elected in 1882.	7	49th	8	Re-elected in 1884.	Mar 4, 1873 – Aug 4, 1908	Republican	William B. Allison (Dubuque)	5
7	James F. Wilson (Fairfield)	Republican	Mar 4, 1883 – Mar 3, 1895	Elected in 1882.	7	50th	8	Re-elected in 1884.	Mar 4, 1873 – Aug 4, 1908	Republican	William B. Allison (Dubuque)	5
7	James F. Wilson (Fairfield)	Republican	Mar 4, 1883 – Mar 3, 1895	Re-elected in 1888. Retired.	8	51st	8	Re-elected in 1884.	Mar 4, 1873 – Aug 4, 1908	Republican	William B. Allison (Dubuque)	5
7	James F. Wilson (Fairfield)	Republican	Mar 4, 1883 – Mar 3, 1895	Re-elected in 1888. Retired.	8	52nd	9	Re-elected in 1890.	Mar 4, 1873 – Aug 4, 1908	Republican	William B. Allison (Dubuque)	5
7	James F. Wilson (Fairfield)	Republican	Mar 4, 1883 – Mar 3, 1895	Re-elected in 1888. Retired.	8	53rd	9	Re-elected in 1890.	Mar 4, 1873 – Aug 4, 1908	Republican	William B. Allison (Dubuque)	5
8	John H. Gear (Burlington)	Republican	Mar 4, 1895 – Jul 14, 1900	Elected in 1894. Re-elected in 1900, but died.	9	54th	9	Re-elected in 1890.	Mar 4, 1873 – Aug 4, 1908	Republican	William B. Allison (Dubuque)	5
8	John H. Gear (Burlington)	Republican	Mar 4, 1895 – Jul 14, 1900	Elected in 1894. Re-elected in 1900, but died.	9	55th	10	Re-elected in 1896.	Mar 4, 1873 – Aug 4, 1908	Republican	William B. Allison (Dubuque)	5
8	John H. Gear (Burlington)	Republican	Mar 4, 1895 – Jul 14, 1900	Elected in 1894. Re-elected in 1900, but died.	9	56th	10	Re-elected in 1896.	Mar 4, 1873 – Aug 4, 1908	Republican	William B. Allison (Dubuque)	5
Vacant			Jul 14, 1900 – Aug 22, 1900		9	56th	10	Re-elected in 1896.	Mar 4, 1873 – Aug 4, 1908	Republican	William B. Allison (Dubuque)	5
9	Jonathan P. Dolliver (Fort Dodge)	Republican	Aug 22, 1900 – Oct 15, 1910	Appointed to finish Gear's term.	9	56th	10	Re-elected in 1896.	Mar 4, 1873 – Aug 4, 1908	Republican	William B. Allison (Dubuque)	5
9	Jonathan P. Dolliver (Fort Dodge)	Republican	Aug 22, 1900 – Oct 15, 1910	Appointed to begin the vacant term. Elected in 1902 to finish the vacant term.	10	57th	10	Re-elected in 1896.	Mar 4, 1873 – Aug 4, 1908	Republican	William B. Allison (Dubuque)	5
9	Jonathan P. Dolliver (Fort Dodge)	Republican	Aug 22, 1900 – Oct 15, 1910	Appointed to begin the vacant term. Elected in 1902 to finish the vacant term.	10	58th	11	Re-elected in 1902. Renominated in 1908 but died before the general election.	Mar 4, 1873 – Aug 4, 1908	Republican	William B. Allison (Dubuque)	5
9	Jonathan P. Dolliver (Fort Dodge)	Republican	Aug 22, 1900 – Oct 15, 1910	Appointed to begin the vacant term. Elected in 1902 to finish the vacant term.	10	59th	11	Re-elected in 1902. Renominated in 1908 but died before the general election.	Mar 4, 1873 – Aug 4, 1908	Republican	William B. Allison (Dubuque)	5
9	Jonathan P. Dolliver (Fort Dodge)	Republican	Aug 22, 1900 – Oct 15, 1910	Re-elected in 1907. Died.	11	60th	11	Re-elected in 1902. Renominated in 1908 but died before the general election.	Mar 4, 1873 – Aug 4, 1908	Republican	William B. Allison (Dubuque)	5
9	Jonathan P. Dolliver (Fort Dodge)	Republican	Aug 22, 1900 – Oct 15, 1910	Re-elected in 1907. Died.	11	60th	11		Aug 4, 1908 – Nov 24, 1908	Vacant		
9	Jonathan P. Dolliver (Fort Dodge)	Republican	Aug 22, 1900 – Oct 15, 1910	Re-elected in 1907. Died.	11	60th	11	Elected to finish Allison's term.	Nov 24, 1908 – Jul 30, 1926	Republican	Albert B. Cummins (Des Moines)	6
9	Jonathan P. Dolliver (Fort Dodge)	Republican	Aug 22, 1900 – Oct 15, 1910	Re-elected in 1907. Died.	11	61st	12	Re-elected in 1909.	Nov 24, 1908 – Jul 30, 1926	Republican	Albert B. Cummins (Des Moines)	6
Vacant			Oct 15, 1910 – Nov 12, 1910		11	61st	12	Re-elected in 1909.	Nov 24, 1908 – Jul 30, 1926	Republican	Albert B. Cummins (Des Moines)	6
10	Lafayette Young (Des Moines)	Republican	Nov 12, 1910 – Apr 11, 1911	Appointed to continue Dolliver's term. Lost election to finish Dolliver's term.	11	61st	12	Re-elected in 1909.	Nov 24, 1908 – Jul 30, 1926	Republican	Albert B. Cummins (Des Moines)	6
10	Lafayette Young (Des Moines)	Republican	Nov 12, 1910 – Apr 11, 1911	Appointed to continue Dolliver's term. Lost election to finish Dolliver's term.	11	62nd	12	Re-elected in 1909.	Nov 24, 1908 – Jul 30, 1926	Republican	Albert B. Cummins (Des Moines)	6
11	William S. Kenyon (Fort Dodge)	Republican	Apr 12, 1911 – Feb 24, 1922	Elected to finish Dolliver's term.	11	62nd	12	Re-elected in 1909.	Nov 24, 1908 – Jul 30, 1926	Republican	Albert B. Cummins (Des Moines)	6
11	William S. Kenyon (Fort Dodge)	Republican	Apr 12, 1911 – Feb 24, 1922	Re-elected in 1913.	12	63rd	12	Re-elected in 1909.	Nov 24, 1908 – Jul 30, 1926	Republican	Albert B. Cummins (Des Moines)	6
11	William S. Kenyon (Fort Dodge)	Republican	Apr 12, 1911 – Feb 24, 1922	Re-elected in 1913.	12	64th	13	Re-elected in 1914.	Nov 24, 1908 – Jul 30, 1926	Republican	Albert B. Cummins (Des Moines)	6
11	William S. Kenyon (Fort Dodge)	Republican	Apr 12, 1911 – Feb 24, 1922	Re-elected in 1913.	12	65th	13	Re-elected in 1914.	Nov 24, 1908 – Jul 30, 1926	Republican	Albert B. Cummins (Des Moines)	6
11	William S. Kenyon (Fort Dodge)	Republican	Apr 12, 1911 – Feb 24, 1922	Re-elected in 1918. Resigned to become Judge of the U.S. Court of Appeals.	13	66th	13	Re-elected in 1914.	Nov 24, 1908 – Jul 30, 1926	Republican	Albert B. Cummins (Des Moines)	6
11	William S. Kenyon (Fort Dodge)	Republican	Apr 12, 1911 – Feb 24, 1922	Re-elected in 1918. Resigned to become Judge of the U.S. Court of Appeals.	13	67th	14	Re-elected in 1920. Lost renomination, then died.	Nov 24, 1908 – Jul 30, 1926	Republican	Albert B. Cummins (Des Moines)	6
12	Charles A. Rawson (Des Moines)	Republican	Feb 24, 1922 – Dec 1, 1922	Appointed to continue Kenyon's term. Retired when his successor was elected.	13	67th	14	Re-elected in 1920. Lost renomination, then died.	Nov 24, 1908 – Jul 30, 1926	Republican	Albert B. Cummins (Des Moines)	6
13	Smith W. Brookhart (Washington)	Republican	Dec 1, 1922 – Apr 12, 1926	Elected to finish Kenyon's term.	13	67th	14	Re-elected in 1920. Lost renomination, then died.	Nov 24, 1908 – Jul 30, 1926	Republican	Albert B. Cummins (Des Moines)	6
13	Smith W. Brookhart (Washington)	Republican	Dec 1, 1922 – Apr 12, 1926	Elected to finish Kenyon's term.	13	68th	14	Re-elected in 1920. Lost renomination, then died.	Nov 24, 1908 – Jul 30, 1926	Republican	Albert B. Cummins (Des Moines)	6
13	Smith W. Brookhart (Washington)	Republican	Dec 1, 1922 – Apr 12, 1926	Re-elected in 1924. Lost election challenge.	14	69th	14	Re-elected in 1920. Lost renomination, then died.	Nov 24, 1908 – Jul 30, 1926	Republican	Albert B. Cummins (Des Moines)	6
14	Daniel F. Steck (Ottumwa)	Democratic	Apr 12, 1926 – Mar 3, 1931	Successfully challenged his predecessor's election. Lost re-election.	14	69th	14	Re-elected in 1920. Lost renomination, then died.	Nov 24, 1908 – Jul 30, 1926	Republican	Albert B. Cummins (Des Moines)	6
14	Daniel F. Steck (Ottumwa)	Democratic	Apr 12, 1926 – Mar 3, 1931	Successfully challenged his predecessor's election. Lost re-election.	14	69th	14		Jul 30, 1926 – Aug 7, 1926	Vacant		
14	Daniel F. Steck (Ottumwa)	Democratic	Apr 12, 1926 – Mar 3, 1931	Successfully challenged his predecessor's election. Lost re-election.	14	69th	14	Appointed to continue Cummins's term. Elected in 1926 to finish Cummins's term. Retired.	Aug 7, 1926 – Mar 3, 1927	Republican	David W. Stewart (Sioux City)	7
14	Daniel F. Steck (Ottumwa)	Democratic	Apr 12, 1926 – Mar 3, 1931	Successfully challenged his predecessor's election. Lost re-election.	14	70th	15	Elected in 1926. Lost renomination and then lost re-election as an Independent.	Mar 4, 1927 – Mar 3, 1933	Republican	Smith W. Brookhart (Washington)	8
14	Daniel F. Steck (Ottumwa)	Democratic	Apr 12, 1926 – Mar 3, 1931	Successfully challenged his predecessor's election. Lost re-election.	14	71st	15	Elected in 1926. Lost renomination and then lost re-election as an Independent.	Mar 4, 1927 – Mar 3, 1933	Republican	Smith W. Brookhart (Washington)	8
15	L. J. Dickinson (Algona)	Republican	Mar 4, 1931 – Jan 3, 1937	Elected in 1930. Lost re-election.	15	72nd	15	Elected in 1926. Lost renomination and then lost re-election as an Independent.	Mar 4, 1927 – Mar 3, 1933	Republican	Smith W. Brookhart (Washington)	8
15	L. J. Dickinson (Algona)	Republican	Mar 4, 1931 – Jan 3, 1937	Elected in 1930. Lost re-election.	15	73rd	16	Elected in 1932. Died.	Mar 4, 1933 – Jul 16, 1936	Democratic	Louis Murphy (Dubuque)	9
15	L. J. Dickinson (Algona)	Republican	Mar 4, 1931 – Jan 3, 1937	Elected in 1930. Lost re-election.	15	74th	16	Elected in 1932. Died.	Mar 4, 1933 – Jul 16, 1936	Democratic	Louis Murphy (Dubuque)	9
15	L. J. Dickinson (Algona)	Republican	Mar 4, 1931 – Jan 3, 1937	Elected in 1930. Lost re-election.	15	74th	16		Jul 16, 1936 – Nov 3, 1936	Vacant		
15	L. J. Dickinson (Algona)	Republican	Mar 4, 1931 – Jan 3, 1937	Elected in 1930. Lost re-election.	15	74th	16	Elected to finish Murphy's term.	Nov 3, 1936 – Jan 3, 1945	Democratic	Guy Gillette (Cherokee)	10
16	Clyde L. Herring (Des Moines)	Democratic	Jan 3, 1937 – Jan 3, 1943	Elected in 1936. Did not take seat until Jan 15, 1937 in order to remain Governor of Iowa. Lost re-election.	16	75th	16	Elected to finish Murphy's term.	Nov 3, 1936 – Jan 3, 1945	Democratic	Guy Gillette (Cherokee)	10
16	Clyde L. Herring (Des Moines)	Democratic	Jan 3, 1937 – Jan 3, 1943	Elected in 1936. Did not take seat until Jan 15, 1937 in order to remain Governor of Iowa. Lost re-election.	16	76th	17	Re-elected in 1938. Lost re-election.	Nov 3, 1936 – Jan 3, 1945	Democratic	Guy Gillette (Cherokee)	10
16	Clyde L. Herring (Des Moines)	Democratic	Jan 3, 1937 – Jan 3, 1943	Elected in 1936. Did not take seat until Jan 15, 1937 in order to remain Governor of Iowa. Lost re-election.	16	77th	17	Re-elected in 1938. Lost re-election.	Nov 3, 1936 – Jan 3, 1945	Democratic	Guy Gillette (Cherokee)	10
17	George A. Wilson (Des Moines)	Republican	Jan 3, 1943 – Jan 3, 1949	Elected in 1942. Did not take seat until Jan 14, 1943 in order to remain Governor of Iowa. Lost re-election.	17	78th	17	Re-elected in 1938. Lost re-election.	Nov 3, 1936 – Jan 3, 1945	Democratic	Guy Gillette (Cherokee)	10
17	George A. Wilson (Des Moines)	Republican	Jan 3, 1943 – Jan 3, 1949	Elected in 1942. Did not take seat until Jan 14, 1943 in order to remain Governor of Iowa. Lost re-election.	17	79th	18	Elected in 1944.	Jan 3, 1945 – Jan 3, 1969	Republican	Bourke B. Hickenlooper (Cedar Rapids)	11
17	George A. Wilson (Des Moines)	Republican	Jan 3, 1943 – Jan 3, 1949	Elected in 1942. Did not take seat until Jan 14, 1943 in order to remain Governor of Iowa. Lost re-election.	17	80th	18	Elected in 1944.	Jan 3, 1945 – Jan 3, 1969	Republican	Bourke B. Hickenlooper (Cedar Rapids)	11
18	Guy Gillette (Cherokee)	Democratic	Jan 3, 1949 – Jan 3, 1955	Elected in 1948. Lost re-election.	18	81st	18	Elected in 1944.	Jan 3, 1945 – Jan 3, 1969	Republican	Bourke B. Hickenlooper (Cedar Rapids)	11
18	Guy Gillette (Cherokee)	Democratic	Jan 3, 1949 – Jan 3, 1955	Elected in 1948. Lost re-election.	18	82nd	19	Re-elected in 1950.	Jan 3, 1945 – Jan 3, 1969	Republican	Bourke B. Hickenlooper (Cedar Rapids)	11
18	Guy Gillette (Cherokee)	Democratic	Jan 3, 1949 – Jan 3, 1955	Elected in 1948. Lost re-election.	18	83rd	19	Re-elected in 1950.	Jan 3, 1945 – Jan 3, 1969	Republican	Bourke B. Hickenlooper (Cedar Rapids)	11
19	Thomas E. Martin (Iowa City)	Republican	Jan 3, 1955 – Jan 3, 1961	Elected in 1954. Retired.	19	84th	19	Re-elected in 1950.	Jan 3, 1945 – Jan 3, 1969	Republican	Bourke B. Hickenlooper (Cedar Rapids)	11
19	Thomas E. Martin (Iowa City)	Republican	Jan 3, 1955 – Jan 3, 1961	Elected in 1954. Retired.	19	85th	20	Re-elected in 1956.	Jan 3, 1945 – Jan 3, 1969	Republican	Bourke B. Hickenlooper (Cedar Rapids)	11
19	Thomas E. Martin (Iowa City)	Republican	Jan 3, 1955 – Jan 3, 1961	Elected in 1954. Retired.	19	86th	20	Re-elected in 1956.	Jan 3, 1945 – Jan 3, 1969	Republican	Bourke B. Hickenlooper (Cedar Rapids)	11
20	Jack Miller (Sioux City)	Republican	Jan 3, 1961 – Jan 3, 1973	Elected in 1960.	20	87th	20	Re-elected in 1956.	Jan 3, 1945 – Jan 3, 1969	Republican	Bourke B. Hickenlooper (Cedar Rapids)	11
20	Jack Miller (Sioux City)	Republican	Jan 3, 1961 – Jan 3, 1973	Elected in 1960.	20	88th	21	Re-elected in 1962 Retired.	Jan 3, 1945 – Jan 3, 1969	Republican	Bourke B. Hickenlooper (Cedar Rapids)	11
20	Jack Miller (Sioux City)	Republican	Jan 3, 1961 – Jan 3, 1973	Elected in 1960.	20	89th	21	Re-elected in 1962 Retired.	Jan 3, 1945 – Jan 3, 1969	Republican	Bourke B. Hickenlooper (Cedar Rapids)	11
20	Jack Miller (Sioux City)	Republican	Jan 3, 1961 – Jan 3, 1973	Re-elected in 1966. Lost re-election.	21	90th	21	Re-elected in 1962 Retired.	Jan 3, 1945 – Jan 3, 1969	Republican	Bourke B. Hickenlooper (Cedar Rapids)	11
20	Jack Miller (Sioux City)	Republican	Jan 3, 1961 – Jan 3, 1973	Re-elected in 1966. Lost re-election.	21	91st	22	Elected in 1968. Retired.	Jan 3, 1969 – Jan 3, 1975	Democratic	Harold Hughes (Ida Grove)	12
20	Jack Miller (Sioux City)	Republican	Jan 3, 1961 – Jan 3, 1973	Re-elected in 1966. Lost re-election.	21	92nd	22	Elected in 1968. Retired.	Jan 3, 1969 – Jan 3, 1975	Democratic	Harold Hughes (Ida Grove)	12
21	Dick Clark (Marion)	Democratic	Jan 3, 1973 – Jan 3, 1979	Elected in 1972. Lost re-election.	22	93rd	22	Elected in 1968. Retired.	Jan 3, 1969 – Jan 3, 1975	Democratic	Harold Hughes (Ida Grove)	12
21	Dick Clark (Marion)	Democratic	Jan 3, 1973 – Jan 3, 1979	Elected in 1972. Lost re-election.	22	94th	23	Elected in 1974. Lost re-election.	Jan 3, 1975 – Jan 3, 1981	Democratic	John Culver (Cedar Rapids)	13
21	Dick Clark (Marion)	Democratic	Jan 3, 1973 – Jan 3, 1979	Elected in 1972. Lost re-election.	22	95th	23	Elected in 1974. Lost re-election.	Jan 3, 1975 – Jan 3, 1981	Democratic	John Culver (Cedar Rapids)	13
22	Roger Jepsen (Davenport)	Republican	Jan 3, 1979 – Jan 3, 1985	Elected in 1978. Lost re-election.	23	96th	23	Elected in 1974. Lost re-election.	Jan 3, 1975 – Jan 3, 1981	Democratic	John Culver (Cedar Rapids)	13
22	Roger Jepsen (Davenport)	Republican	Jan 3, 1979 – Jan 3, 1985	Elected in 1978. Lost re-election.	23	97th	24	Elected in 1980.	Jan 3, 1981 – present	Republican	Chuck Grassley (New Hartford)	14
22	Roger Jepsen (Davenport)	Republican	Jan 3, 1979 – Jan 3, 1985	Elected in 1978. Lost re-election.	23	98th	24	Elected in 1980.	Jan 3, 1981 – present	Republican	Chuck Grassley (New Hartford)	14
23	Tom Harkin (Cumming)	Democratic	Jan 3, 1985 – Jan 3, 2015	Elected in 1984.	24	99th	24	Elected in 1980.	Jan 3, 1981 – present	Republican	Chuck Grassley (New Hartford)	14
23	Tom Harkin (Cumming)	Democratic	Jan 3, 1985 – Jan 3, 2015	Elected in 1984.	24	100th	25	Re-elected in 1986.	Jan 3, 1981 – present	Republican	Chuck Grassley (New Hartford)	14
23	Tom Harkin (Cumming)	Democratic	Jan 3, 1985 – Jan 3, 2015	Elected in 1984.	24	101st	25	Re-elected in 1986.	Jan 3, 1981 – present	Republican	Chuck Grassley (New Hartford)	14
23	Tom Harkin (Cumming)	Democratic	Jan 3, 1985 – Jan 3, 2015	Re-elected in 1990.	25	102nd	25	Re-elected in 1986.	Jan 3, 1981 – present	Republican	Chuck Grassley (New Hartford)	14
23	Tom Harkin (Cumming)	Democratic	Jan 3, 1985 – Jan 3, 2015	Re-elected in 1990.	25	103rd	26	Re-elected in 1992.	Jan 3, 1981 – present	Republican	Chuck Grassley (New Hartford)	14
23	Tom Harkin (Cumming)	Democratic	Jan 3, 1985 – Jan 3, 2015	Re-elected in 1990.	25	104th	26	Re-elected in 1992.	Jan 3, 1981 – present	Republican	Chuck Grassley (New Hartford)	14
23	Tom Harkin (Cumming)	Democratic	Jan 3, 1985 – Jan 3, 2015	Re-elected in 1996.	26	105th	26	Re-elected in 1992.	Jan 3, 1981 – present	Republican	Chuck Grassley (New Hartford)	14
23	Tom Harkin (Cumming)	Democratic	Jan 3, 1985 – Jan 3, 2015	Re-elected in 1996.	26	106th	27	Re-elected in 1998.	Jan 3, 1981 – present	Republican	Chuck Grassley (New Hartford)	14
23	Tom Harkin (Cumming)	Democratic	Jan 3, 1985 – Jan 3, 2015	Re-elected in 1996.	26	107th	27	Re-elected in 1998.	Jan 3, 1981 – present	Republican	Chuck Grassley (New Hartford)	14
23	Tom Harkin (Cumming)	Democratic	Jan 3, 1985 – Jan 3, 2015	Re-elected in 2002.	27	108th	27	Re-elected in 1998.	Jan 3, 1981 – present	Republican	Chuck Grassley (New Hartford)	14
23	Tom Harkin (Cumming)	Democratic	Jan 3, 1985 – Jan 3, 2015	Re-elected in 2002.	27	109th	28	Re-elected in 2004.	Jan 3, 1981 – present	Republican	Chuck Grassley (New Hartford)	14
23	Tom Harkin (Cumming)	Democratic	Jan 3, 1985 – Jan 3, 2015	Re-elected in 2002.	27	110th	28	Re-elected in 2004.	Jan 3, 1981 – present	Republican	Chuck Grassley (New Hartford)	14
23	Tom Harkin (Cumming)	Democratic	Jan 3, 1985 – Jan 3, 2015	Re-elected in 2008 Retired.	28	111th	28	Re-elected in 2004.	Jan 3, 1981 – present	Republican	Chuck Grassley (New Hartford)	14
23	Tom Harkin (Cumming)	Democratic	Jan 3, 1985 – Jan 3, 2015	Re-elected in 2008 Retired.	28	112th	29	Re-elected in 2010.	Jan 3, 1981 – present	Republican	Chuck Grassley (New Hartford)	14
23	Tom Harkin (Cumming)	Democratic	Jan 3, 1985 – Jan 3, 2015	Re-elected in 2008 Retired.	28	113th	29	Re-elected in 2010.	Jan 3, 1981 – present	Republican	Chuck Grassley (New Hartford)	14
24	Joni Ernst (Red Oak)	Republican	Jan 3, 2015 – present	Elected in 2014.	29	114th	29	Re-elected in 2010.	Jan 3, 1981 – present	Republican	Chuck Grassley (New Hartford)	14
24	Joni Ernst (Red Oak)	Republican	Jan 3, 2015 – present	Elected in 2014.	29	115th	30	Re-elected in 2016.	Jan 3, 1981 – present	Republican	Chuck Grassley (New Hartford)	14
24	Joni Ernst (Red Oak)	Republican	Jan 3, 2015 – present	Elected in 2014.	29	116th	30	Re-elected in 2016.	Jan 3, 1981 – present	Republican	Chuck Grassley (New Hartford)	14
24	Joni Ernst (Red Oak)	Republican	Jan 3, 2015 – present	Re-elected in 2020. Retiring at the end of term.	30	117th	30	Re-elected in 2016.	Jan 3, 1981 – present	Republican	Chuck Grassley (New Hartford)	14
24	Joni Ernst (Red Oak)	Republican	Jan 3, 2015 – present	Re-elected in 2020. Retiring at the end of term.	30	118th	31	Re-elected in 2022.	Jan 3, 1981 – present	Republican	Chuck Grassley (New Hartford)	14
24	Joni Ernst (Red Oak)	Republican	Jan 3, 2015 – present	Re-elected in 2020. Retiring at the end of term.	30	119th	31	Re-elected in 2022.	Jan 3, 1981 – present	Republican	Chuck Grassley (New Hartford)	14
25	Josh Turek (elect) (Council Bluffs)	Democratic	Taking office Jan 3, 2027	Elected in 2026.	31	120th	31	Re-elected in 2022.	Jan 3, 1981 – present	Republican	Chuck Grassley (New Hartford)	14
25	Josh Turek (elect) (Council Bluffs)	Democratic	Taking office Jan 3, 2027	Elected in 2026.	31	121st	32	To be determined in the 2028 election.				
25	Josh Turek (elect) (Council Bluffs)	Democratic	Taking office Jan 3, 2027	Elected in 2026.	31	122nd	32	To be determined in the 2028 election.				
To be determined in the 2032 election.					32	123rd	32	To be determined in the 2028 election.				

== See also ==
- Elections in Iowa
- Iowa's congressional delegations
- List of United States representatives from Iowa
