= 1948 United States Senate election in Iowa =

- November 2, 1948
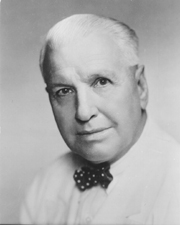

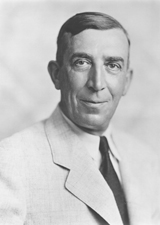
Nominee	Guy Gillette	George A. Wilson
Party	Democratic	Republican
Popular vote	578,226	415,778
Percentage	57.80%	41.56%
- County results Gillette: 40–50% 50–60% 60–70% Wilson: 50–60%
U.S. senator before election
George A. Wilson
Republican
Elected U.S. Senator
Guy Gillette
Democratic

The 1948 United States Senate election in Iowa took place on November 2, 1948. Incumbent Republican Senator George A. Wilson ran for re-election to a second term but was defeated by Democratic former Senator Guy Gillette who successfully sought a comeback. Wilson being perceived as an ineffective senator along with the lack of prominent Republican allies to back his re-election bid contributed to his landslide defeat.

== Republican primary ==
=== Candidates ===
- John N. Calhoun, former State Senator from Keosauqua (1933–35) and National Guard Lieutenant Colonel in World War II
- George A. Wilson, incumbent Senator since 1943

=== Results ===
1948 Republican U.S. Senate primary
Party	Candidate	Votes	%
Republican	George A. Wilson (incumbent)	185,215	68.44%
Republican	John N. Calhoun	85,402	31.56%
Total votes		270,617	100.00%

== Democratic primary ==
=== Candidates ===
- Guy Gillette, former U.S. Senator (1936–45)
- Ernest J. Seemann, perennial candidate

=== Results ===
1948 Democratic U.S. Senate primary
Party	Candidate	Votes	%
Democratic	Guy Gillette	51,576	79.04%
Democratic	Ernest Seemann	13,680	20.96%
Total votes		65,256	100.00%

== General election ==
=== Results ===
1948 U.S. Senate election in Iowa
Party	Candidate	Votes	%	±%
Democratic	Guy Gillette	578,226	57.80%	▲16.10
Republican	George A. Wilson (incumbent)	415,778	41.56%	▼16.32
Progressive	Seymour Pitcher	3,387	0.34%	N/A
Prohibition	Z. Everett Kellum	2,580	0.26%	▲0.05
Socialist	Hugo Bockewitz	441	0.04%	N/A
Total votes		1,000,412	100.00%	

== See also ==
- 1948 United States Senate elections
