= Telegraph Herald =

Newspaper in Dubuque, Iowa

- Type: Daily newspaper
- Format: Tabloid
- Owner(s): Woodward Communications, Inc.
- Publisher: Mike Fortman
- Editor-in-chief: Amy Gilligan
- Managing editor: Allie Hinga
- Photo editor: Dave Kettering
- Founded: 1836
- Language: English
- Headquarters: 801 Bluff Street, Dubuque, IA United States
- Circulation: 14,976
- ISSN: 1041-293X (print); 2993-8384 (web)
- OCLC number: 232117616
- Website: telegraphherald.com

The Telegraph Herald, locally referred to as the TH, is a newspaper published three days a week in Dubuque, Iowa, for the population of Dubuque and surrounding areas in Iowa, Illinois, and Wisconsin. The newspaper is the result of a 1901 merger of the Dubuque Herald and the Dubuque Telegraph. A descendant of the Dubuque Visitor (founded in 1836), the Dubuque Herald's first editor was Dennis Mahony.

The Telegraph was founded in 1870, and before merging with the Herald had absorbed eight local publications. John S. Murphy was the editor and publisher of the Telegraph at the time of its merger until his death in March 1902. He was a prominent Democratic leader, and editorialized at the time of the merger that "politically and economically the policy of the Telegraph-Herald will be a continuation of that of the Telegraph."

His son and successor as editor from 1902 to 1914, Richard Louis Murphy, was elected to the U.S. Senate in 1932. The paper is published by Woodward Communications, which is also based in Dubuque. The current publisher is Mike Fortman and the executive editor is Amy Gilligan.

In January 2025, the newspaper reduced its print publication schedule from six days per week to three.

== See also ==
- List of newspapers in Iowa
