= Charles A. Rawson =

American politician (1867-1936)

Charles Augustus Rawson
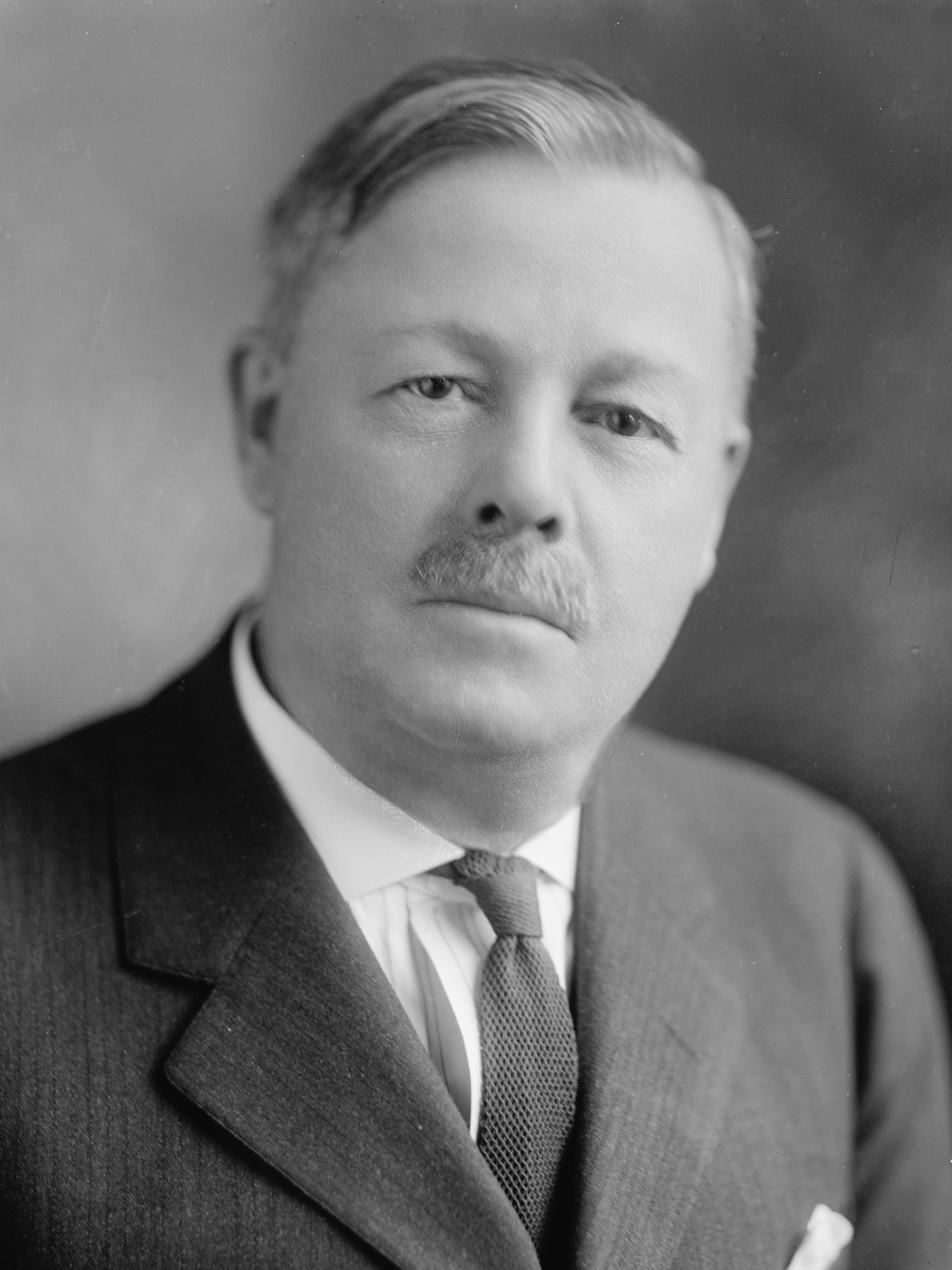

United States Senator from Iowa
- In office February 24, 1922 – November 7, 1922
- Appointed by: Nathan E. Kendall
- Preceded by: William S. Kenyon
- Succeeded by: Smith W. Brookhart

Personal details
- Born: May 29, 1867 Des Moines, Iowa, U.S.
- Died: September 2, 1936 (aged 69) Des Moines, Iowa, U.S.
- Party: Republican

Charles Augustus Rawson (May 29, 1867 – September 2, 1936) was an unelected United States Senator from Iowa for nine months in 1922.

Born in Des Moines, he attended the public schools and Grinnell College. He engaged in banking and the insurance business and also in the manufacture of clay products, and was a member of the board of trustees of Grinnell. He was State chairman of the war work council of YMCA and served overseas with that organization during the First World War.

On February 17, 1922, Rawson was appointed by Governor Nathan Kendall as a Republican to the U.S. Senate to fill the vacancy caused by the resignation of William Squire Kenyon. From the outset, it was understood that he would serve for only a short time; in announcing the appointment, Governor Kendall stated that "It is understood that Mr. Rawson will not aspire to continue in the office but will serve only until a senator can regularly be chosen." His appointment was effective on February 24, 1922, and he served until November 7, 1922, when a successor elected in the 1922 general election (Smith W. Brookhart) was qualified.

He was a member of the Republican National Committee from 1924 to 1932. He resumed the manufacture of clay products and was also interested in banking. Rawson died in Des Moines in 1936; interment was in Woodland Cemetery.

U.S. Senate
Preceded by William S. Kenyon	U.S. senator (Class 2) from Iowa; 1922	Succeeded by Smith W. Brookhart
