= Smith W. Brookhart =

American politician (1869-1944)

Smith Wildman Brookhart
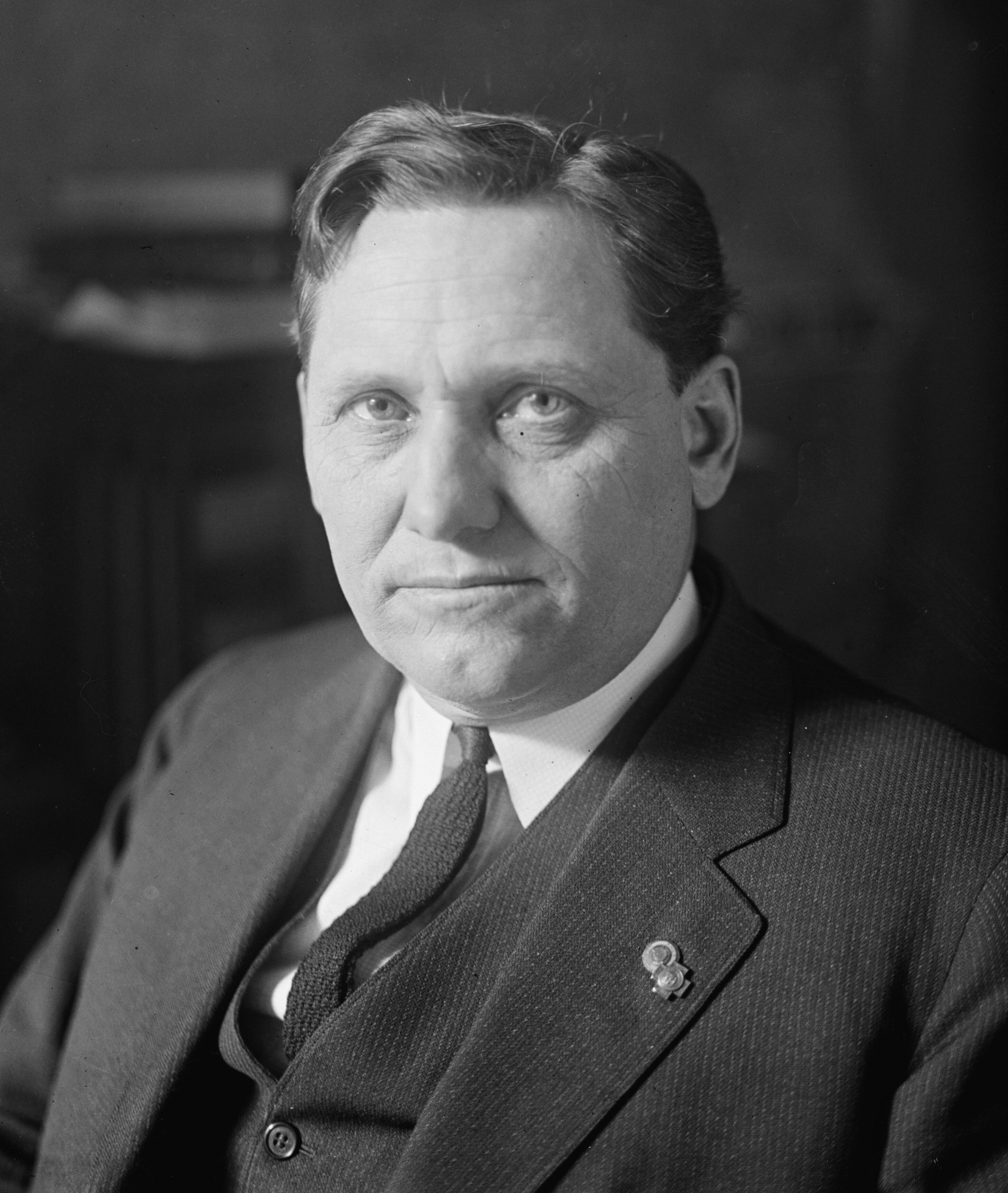
- Brookhart in 1924

United States Senator from Iowa
- In office March 4, 1927 – March 3, 1933
- Preceded by: David W. Stewart
- Succeeded by: Richard L. Murphy
- In office November 8, 1922 – April 12, 1926
- Preceded by: Charles A. Rawson
- Succeeded by: Daniel F. Steck

Personal details
- Born: February 2, 1869 Arbela, Missouri, U.S.
- Died: November 15, 1944 (aged 75) Prescott, Arizona, U.S.
- Party: Republican
- Children: 6; including Florence Brookhart Yount

Smith Wildman Brookhart (February 2, 1869 – November 15, 1944), was twice elected as a Republican to represent Iowa in the United States Senate. He was considered an "insurgent" within the Republican Party. His criticisms of the Harding and the Coolidge administrations and of business interests alienated others in the Republican caucus and led to his ouster from the Senate over an election challenge.

Brookhart's absence from the Senate was brief, as he took the first opportunity to return by challenging and defeating the state's senior Republican senator. He was also a strong supporter of Prohibition and its enforcement, so as public support for prohibition waned, the same occurred to his political career.

== Early life ==
Brookhart was born in a cabin on a farm in Scotland County, Missouri, the son of Abram C. and Cynthia Wildman Brookhart. He was educated in country schools, graduated from Bloomfield High School, and attended Southern Iowa Normal School, both in Bloomfield, Iowa, where he graduated in 1889 with an emphasis in scientific courses. For five years, he taught in country schools and high school while he studied law in offices in Bloomfield and Keosauqua, Iowa. He was admitted to the bar in 1892 and began practice in Washington, Iowa. Four years later, his brother, J. L. Brookhart, joined his firm. He served for six years as Washington County Attorney.

On June 22, 1897, he married Jennie Hearne. They had four sons and two daughters: Charles Edward Brookhart, John Roberts Brookhart, Samuel Colar Brookhart, Smith W. Brookhart Jr., Florence Hearne Brookhart Yount, and Edith A. Brookhart Millard.

He served in the US Army during the Spanish–American War and World War I in which he reached the rank of lieutenant colonel. He was renowned for his marksmanship with a rifle. Brookhart served as president of the National Rifle Association of America from 1921 to 1925.

== First run for Senate ==
In the early 1920s Brookhart announced his candidacy for the Republican nomination for the U.S. Senate seat held since 1908 by the Republican Albert B. Cummins, who was a progressive senator but was from an earlier generation and distrusted both corporate interests and unions. Brookhart attempted to build his campaign around his criticism of railroad regulatory legislation Cummins had co-authored, the Esch–Cummins Act, which Brookhart claimed to do too little to wrest ownership and control of railroads away from Wall Street interests. Brookhart attempted to lure rank-and-file blue-collar workers to register as Republicans so that they could vote for him in the primary, which prompted Cummins to associate Brookhart with radical workers movements such as "the Socialists, reds and Industrial Workers of the World." Cummins was sidelined by illness in the weeks leading up to the primary but defeated Brookhart.

== Senate service ==
=== 1922–1926 ===
On his second attempt, Brookhart was elected to the Senate in 1922. A special election was required because Iowa Senator William S. Kenyon had resigned before the completion of his term to accept an appointment as federal judge. After receiving over 41 percent of the vote in a six-way Republican primary, Brookhart was backed by the national Republican Party, and defeated future Governor and US Senator Clyde L. Herring.

Senator Brookhart was soon noted in the national press for his refusal to dress the part of a US Senator. Time quoted him in their inaugural March 3, 1923 issue as saying, "If I am asked to the White House, or to attend any other state occasion, I shall go as I am, with cowhide shoes and the clothes I wear on the farm. If my constituents wish me to do so, I shall go the extreme of donning overalls."

Time would later write, Brookhart's "pugnacious cowhide radicalism nettled patrician Senators." Two years later, in the 1924 election, he made his first attempt to win a full term. Running again as the Republican nominee, Brookhart appeared to have defeated the Democratic candidate, Daniel F. Steck, by a small margin, with Brookhart getting 447,594 votes to Steck's 446,840. Brookhart thus took office on March 4, 1925, but Steck pursued a challenge with the Senate Committee on Elections and Privileges. In the committee hearings on Steck's challenge, the Iowa Republican Party sided with the Democrat Steck by filing a brief that was sharply critical of Brookhart and accused him of disloyalty to the Republican presidential ticket in 1924 because of his support for the Progressive Party presidential candidate Robert M. La Follette of Wisconsin.

Brookhart held the seat only until April 12, 1926, when the Senate voted by a margin of 45–41 to replace him with Steck, who then served out the remainder of the term. Because the Senate was then firmly in Republican control, his ouster was possible only because over a dozen Republicans voted with Democrats to unseat Brookhart. On other occasions, the Senate has settled election disputes before a senator took office, but that was the only time that the results were overturned after the senator had been seated. The biographer George William McDaniel concludes:

between 1924 and 1926, those in charge of the established political machinery united to defeat Brookhart. In part they acted out of fear of his program; some really believed that it would lead to socialism or worse. In part they feared that he intended to remake the Republican party in his own image, a charge he repeatedly denied and one that most thoughtful politicians knew to be unfounded since he never bothered to build the kind of county-by-county organizations necessary for such a move. In addition, party leaders were upset that he won without them and thus showed that the political party was not necessary as the vehicle for election. Brookhart aided their efforts by his intemperate speech at Emmetsburg, giving them an excuse to read him out of the party.

=== 1927–1933 ===
Immediately upon his ouster from the Senate in April 1926, Brookhart ran for Iowa's other Senate seat, which was still held by Cummins. In the Republican primary, Brookhart stunned his former colleagues and the Iowa Republican establishment by decisively defeating Cummins. As Idaho Republican William Edgar Borah said the following morning, "Senator Cummins was highly respected by everyone who knew him. He was a man of recognized ability, and only a real political revolution could have defeated him."

In the general election, Brookhart defeated the conservative Democrat Claude R. Porter, who had been a US Attorney during the Wilson administration. Brookhart settled into a shaky co-existence with the Republican establishment.

Brookhart was a harsh critic of the Federal Reserve: "A more sinister or evil device could not be arranged for using the people's savings to their own injury and the destruction of their property values."

He served a full six-year term. However, in the 1932 Republican primary, he was defeated by Henry Field, a Shenandoah, Iowa, nurseryman. Field had attacked Brookhart's absences from the Senate on speaking tours, as well as the number of relatives holding federal positions. Brookhart ran in the 1932 general election as a "progressive" candidate but received fewer than 33,000 votes out of over 890,000 cast.

== Support for Prohibition ==
Brookhart was what was known as a "fervent dry." In a futile effort to stop the growing sentiment for the repeal of Prohibition, Brookhart began a nationwide tour during which he debated U.S. Representative Fiorello LaGuardia, Clarence Darrow, and other prominent "wets," who opposed Prohibition.

Brookhart favored dramatically increasing Prohibition enforcement appropriations by $240 million. That was a very unpopular position because of widespread unemployment and underemployment during the Great Depression. Those favoring repeal argued that legalizing alcoholic beverages would stimulate the economy and provide desperately-needed tax revenue.

It was said that Brookhart's opinions regarding alcohol came from his role as a rifle instructor for the Iowa National Guard in whichever concluded that alcohol and guns were incompatible. He went as far as to quantify the accuracy harms associated with mild beer by claiming it lowered accuracy by 7%. With that information, he convinced the Governor of Iowa to make the rifle range "bone dry."

== Later life ==
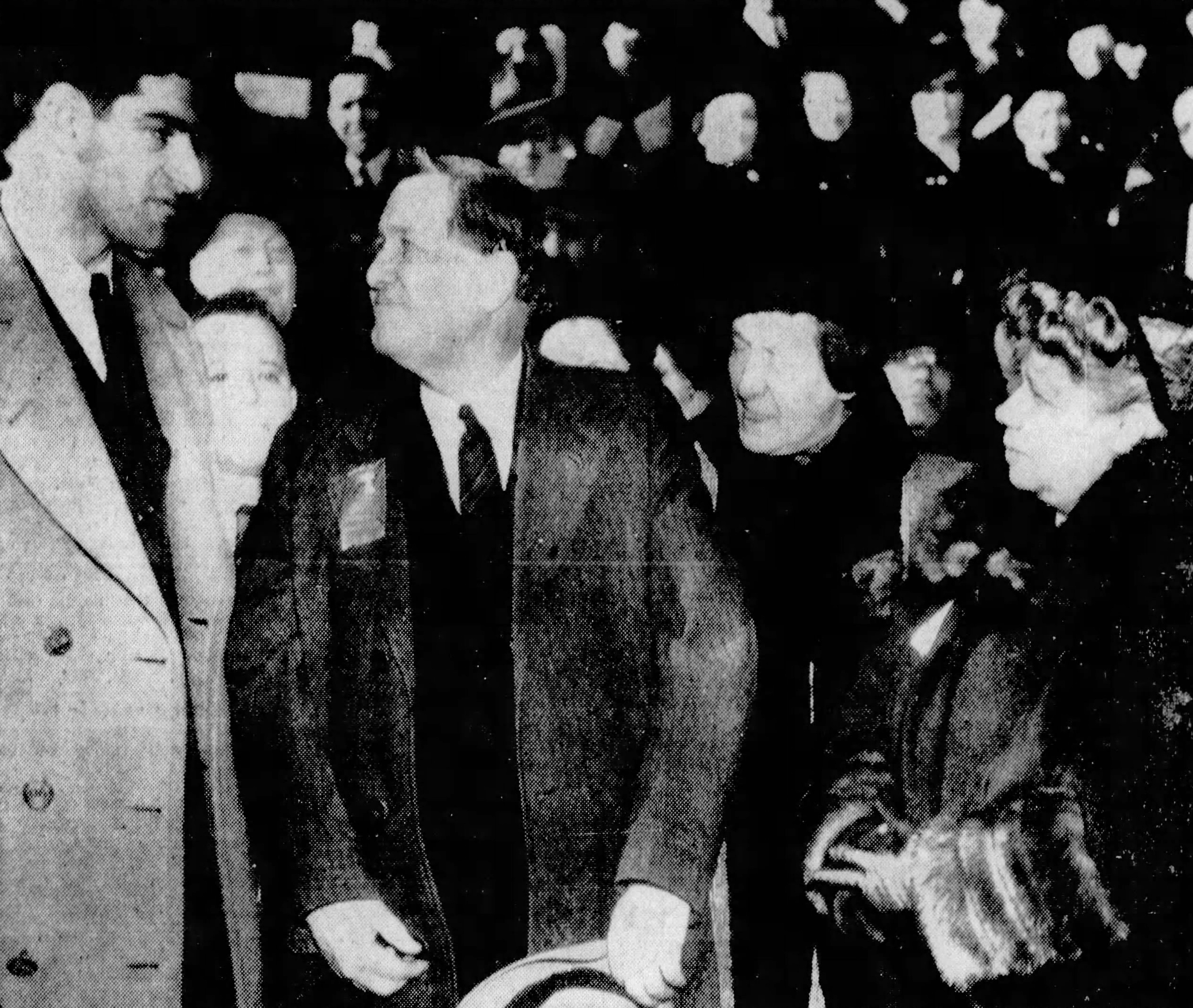
Brookhart with former Abraham Lincoln Brigade commander Milton Wolff and Alice F. Liveright at an event on the steps of the U.S. Capitol Building calling to lift the embargo on Spain, January 9, 1939

After his 1932 defeat, Brookhart was a special advisor to the federal government on Soviet trade, until he resigned in 1935 and returned to Iowa. In this role, he was an early advocate for United States recognition of the Soviet Union.

Upon his return to Iowa, Brookhart made a final attempt to return to the Senate. He joined an already-crowded field of candidates for the Republican nomination for Senate in 1936 but finished a distant second to the incumbent, L. J. Dickinson. Brookhart then announced a plan to unite diverse progressive elements under a new banner, declined an opportunity to run for the Senate under a Farmer-Labor Party nomination, and endorsed Franklin Roosevelt's 1936 re-election.

After the 1936 election, Brookhart opened a law office in Washington, DC, and remained there until 1943, when he went to Arizona for his health. He died in Prescott, Arizona, on November 15, 1944.

One of his sons, US Army Lieutenant Colonel Smith W. Brookhart Jr., served as an assistant trial counsel for the prosecution at the Nuremberg War Trials.

== See also ==
- Smith Wildman and Jennie (Hearne) Brookhart House in Washington, Iowa is listed on the National Register of Historic Places.

== Sources ==
- McDaniel, George William. "The Republican Party in Iowa and the Defeat of Smith Wildman Brookhart, 1924-1926." The Annals of Iowa 48.7 (1987): 413–434. online
- McDaniel, George William (1995). Smith Wildman Brookhart: Iowa's Renegade Republican (1st ed.). Ames, Iowa: Iowa State Press. ISBN 0-8138-2107-X.
- Editorial Cartoons of J.N. 'Ding' Darling (Iowa Digital Library: University of Iowa Libraries) - Cartoons referencing or depicting Smith W. Brookhart.

Party political offices
Preceded by William S. Kenyon	Republican nominee for U.S. Senator from Iowa (Class 2); 1922, 1924	Succeeded by Lester J. Dickinson
Preceded by David W. Stewart	Republican nominee for U.S. Senator from Iowa (Class 3); 1926	Succeeded by Henry Field
U.S. Senate
Preceded by Charles A. Rawson	U.S. senator from Iowa; 1922–1926	Succeeded by Daniel F. Steck
Preceded by David W. Stewart	U.S. senator from Iowa; 1927–1933	Succeeded by Richard L. Murphy
National Rifle Association of America
Preceded by William Libbey	President of the NRA; 1921–1925	Succeeded by Francis E. Warren
Preceded by Francis E. Warren	President of the NRA; 1925–1926	Succeeded by Fred M. Waterbury
