= Louis Murphy (American politician) =

American journalist and politician (1875-1936)

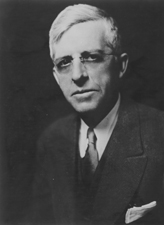

United States Senator from Iowa
- In office March 4, 1933 – July 16, 1936
- Preceded by: Smith W. Brookhart
- Succeeded by: Guy Gillette

Personal details
- Born: November 6, 1875 Dubuque, Iowa, US
- Died: July 16, 1936 (aged 60) Chippewa Falls, Wisconsin, US
- Party: Democratic
- Spouse: Ellen Emma McGuire

Richard Louis Murphy (November 6, 1875 – July 16, 1936) was a Democratic U.S. senator from Iowa. Elected with President Franklin D. Roosevelt in 1932, as only the second Democratic senator from Iowa elected since 1852, Murphy's service was cut short by his accidental death in 1936, with over two years remaining in his only term.

Louis Murphy was born to John and Anna Murphy in Dubuque, Iowa, on November 6, 1875. His father was the publisher of the Dubuque Telegraph-Herald. Louis attended the public schools in Dubuque, including two years of high school, but his earnings were needed at home, so his formal education ended. He began a career in journalism at age 15, by serving as a reporter for the Galena, Illinois, Gazette from 1890 to 1892. Returning to Dubuque in 1892, he worked at the Dubuque Times-Journal as a reporter then as a city editor. Upon his father's death in 1902, he became the editor of the Dubuque Telegraph-Herald, serving in that position until 1914. He was appointed by the Woodrow Wilson Administration to serve as collector of internal revenue for Iowa from 1913 to 1920. After the end of that administration, he worked as an income tax counselor from 1920 to 1931, when he retired from active pursuits.

In 1932, he ran as the Democratic nominee for the U.S. Senate seat then held by Smith W. Brookhart. Henry Field seized the Republican nomination from Brookhart. In the general election, Murphy defeated Field by a wide margin, as part of the Democratic landslide that accompanied the election of Roosevelt and defeat of Herbert Hoover. A chief plank of Murphy's platform was the restoration, as an agricultural relief measure, of the legality of beer.

Murphy served from March 4, 1933, until his death in an automobile accident near Chippewa Falls, Wisconsin, on July 16, 1936. He and his wife, Ellen, were returning to Dubuque from a week's vacation in Hayward, Wis., with Fred W. Woodward, publisher of the Dubuque Telegraph Herald, and his wife, Elsie. Murphy's wife, one of three passengers injured in the crash, reported that the accident occurred when a tire blew out while Murphy was driving at low speed, causing it to plunge off an embankment.

With Murphy's death, the Roosevelt Administration lost a reliable ally in the Senate. Although Murphy was replaced by another Democrat, (Guy M. Gillette), Gillette was often at odds with the president, opposing his plan to expand the Supreme Court, and opposing, until late 1941, Roosevelt's support for Great Britain.

At the time of the accident, Mr. and Mrs. Murphy were the parents of five children—Mary, Elinor Ann, Imelda, Ellen and Charles. A sixth child had died in infancy.

== See also ==
- List of members of the United States Congress who died in office (1900–1949)

Party political offices
Preceded by Claude R. Porter	Democratic nominee for U.S. Senator from Iowa (Class 3); 1932	Succeeded by Guy Gillette
U.S. Senate
Preceded by Smith W. Brookhart (R)	United States Senator (Class 3) from Iowa; 1933 – July 16, 1936 (death)	Succeeded by Guy M. Gillette (D)
