= Ann Selzer =

American political pollster (born 1956)

- Born: 1956 (age 69–70); Rochester, Minnesota, U.S.
- Education: University of Kansas (BA); University of Iowa (PhD)
- Occupation: Pollster
- Years active: 1987–2024 (election polling)
- Website: selzerco.com

Jane Ann Selzer (born 1956) is an American political pollster and the president of the Des Moines, Iowa-based polling firm Selzer & Company, which she founded in 1996. She was described as "the best pollster in politics" by Clare Malone of FiveThirtyEight, which also gave Selzer & Company a rare A+ grade for accuracy.

Her polls of Iowa voters had a reputation for being highly accurate, based on their performance in elections from 2008 through 2020. However, Selzer's polls incorrectly predicted Democratic victories in Iowa for the presidential elections of 2004 and 2024, with the latter underestimating Republican Donald Trump by sixteen points. She announced her retirement from the election polling part of her practice shortly after the 2024 election, announcing that she will focus on future endeavors in other parts of her business.

== Early life ==
Selzer was born in Rochester, Minnesota, in 1956, the middle child in a family of five. She was raised in Topeka, Kansas. Selzer attended the University of Kansas, initially as a pre-med student, but eventually lost interest in medicine. She graduated with a Bachelor of Arts in Speech and Dramatics Arts in 1978. She then earned a Ph.D. in Communication Theory and Research from the University of Iowa in 1984.

== Career ==
After graduation, Selzer worked for The Des Moines Register. She established her own polling firm, Selzer & Company, in 1996. She worked as the pollster for the Register for many years, and oversaw nearly all of the Register's Iowa Polls from 1987 to 2024, according to FiveThirtyEight. She has also done polling work for numerous other news organizations, including the Detroit Free Press and the Indianapolis Star. Recently, Selzer has partnered with Grinnell College as a part of the Grinnell College National Poll program.

=== Polling methodology ===
Selzer's polls utilize random sampling through random digit dialing in a dual-frame design with both landlines and cell phones. The sampling frame for her political polls of likely caucusgoers typically consist of lists of registered voters. Likely voters for relevant elections being polled are determined through self-reported responses on intention to vote or participate in caucuses. Selzer states that she uses minimal weighting in her polling, adjusting for demographic variables such as age, race, and sex with U.S. census data and declining to adjust for variables like recalled voting history.

=== Results ===
In the 2004 presidential election, Selzer's polling inaccurately predicted that John Kerry would win Iowa against George W. Bush. Selzer was the only pollster to correctly predict Barack Obama's comfortable victory in the 2008 Iowa Democratic caucuses, and her poll of the 2014 United States Senate election in Iowa also mirrored the actual result exceptionally closely.

Selzer & Co. conducted their final 2016 presidential poll in Iowa in early November, showing Donald Trump ahead of Hillary Clinton by seven percentage points. Most other polls at the time showed a much closer race. Trump won Iowa by 9.4 percentage points. Selzer's final Iowa poll ahead of the 2020 presidential election showed Trump ahead of Joe Biden by seven percentage points, and Republican Senator Joni Ernst ahead of Democratic challenger Theresa Greenfield by four percentage points. This was the only poll conducted in fall 2020 to show Trump ahead by more than two points, while Ernst's race was considered a toss-up. Trump won Iowa by 8.2 percentage points, while Ernst was re-elected by 6.6 points. In a post-election interview with Bloomberg, Selzer suggested that her polls' consistently high performance may be related to making fewer assumptions about the electorate, saying "I assumed nothing. My data told me."

==== 2024 presidential election ====
Prior to the 2024 United States presidential election, Selzer & Co. released their final Iowa poll that had Kamala Harris leading Trump 47% to 44% in the state, markedly different from other polls that showed Trump with a significant lead. The poll was leaked ahead of its embargo, with Governor J. B. Pritzker of Illinois publicly discussing its results at least 45 minutes before its scheduled release. Trump criticized the accuracy of the poll. Selzer responded by saying the poll used the same methodology as in 2016 and 2020, and that, "It would not be in my best interest, or that of my clients—The Des Moines Register and Mediacom—to conjure fake numbers."

Contrary to the poll, Trump won Iowa by a 13-point margin; the error of roughly 16 percentage points was by far the largest of any of Selzer's polls. She pledged to review the data to see if she could explain the significant polling error. FiveThirtyEight hypothesized that Selzer's methodology, which declines to weight for educational attainment and partisan identification, may have led to the divergent result. On November 17, 2024, Selzer announced her retirement from electoral polling, saying she had planned to do so before the 2024 election.

Trump publicly accused her of "possible election fraud" and called for "an investigation" of her. On December 16, Trump said he would sue Selzer and the Des Moines Register, saying their poll "was fraud, and it was election interference." Trump filed the threatened lawsuit against Selzer on December 16, 2024 in the U.S. District Court for the Southern District of Iowa. On January 7, 2025, the Foundation for Individual Rights and Expression (FIRE) announced that it would defend Selzer in the lawsuit, calling the lawsuit "the very definition of a 'SLAPP' suit — a Strategic Lawsuit Against Public Participation." On February 21, FIRE asked the Court to dismiss the suit, writing "'allegations about polls and news stories [the plaintiffs] dislike have nothing to do with fraud' and that Selzer's polling was protected under the First Amendment. After Iowa passed Anti-SLAPP legislation for federal cases in May, Trump asked the District Court to transfer the case to an Iowa state court in June but was refused. On June 30, Trump dropped the federal lawsuit and immediately refiled it in a state court. On October 30 Trump's lawsuit against Selzer and The Des Moines Register was transferred to Iowa State Court after a federal judge refused to move the case to federal court. The decision to keep the case in federal court was overturned by the 8th Circuit Court of Appeals, allowing the case to proceed in Iowa State Court instead. On November 21, the 8th Circuit Court of Appeals ruled in favor of Trump, rejecting Selzer's appeal and allowing Trump's lawsuit to move forward in Iowa state court. Selzer and The Des Moines Register then asked the 8th Circuit Court of Appeals to reconsider, but their request was turned down. This case has since progressed through the Iowa state courts, and on September 23, 2026, Judge Scott Beattie of the Iowa Fifth Judicial District dismissed the case with prejudice.

On January 8, 2025, the Center for American Rights filed a class action lawsuit in Polk County District Court on behalf of West Des Moines resident Dennis Donnelly and other Des Moines Register subscribers. The lawsuit alleges that Selzer and the paper defrauded the readers under Iowa’s Consumer Fraud Act by knowingly publishing inaccurate poll results.

== Final pre-election Selzer & Company polls ==
Election	Democratic candidate	Poll D %	Actual D %	Republican candidate	Poll R %	Actual R %	Poll margin (Note: Calculated after rounding)	Actual margin (Note: Calculated after rounding; excludes invalid write-in votes)	Error	Ref.
1996 IA president	Bill Clinton	46	50.3	Bob Dole	35	40.0	D+11	D+10.4	D+0.6	
1996 IA U.S. Senate	Tom Harkin	46	51.8	Jim Lightfoot	38	46.7	D+8	D+5.1	D+2.9	
1998 IA governor	Tom Vilsack	43	52.3	Jim Lightfoot	47	46.5	R+4	D+5.8	R+9.8	
2000 IA president	Al Gore	44	48.6	George W. Bush	42	48.3	D+2	D+0.3	D+1.7	
2002 IA U.S. Senate	Tom Harkin	50	54.2	Greg Ganske	41	43.8	D+9	D+10.4	R+1.4	
2002 IA governor	Tom Vilsack	52	52.7	Doug Gross	40	44.6	D+12	D+8.2	D+3.8	
2004 IA president	John Kerry	48	49.3	George W. Bush	45	49.9	D+3	R+0.7	D+3.7	
2004 IN president	John Kerry	37	39.3	George W. Bush	57	60.0	R+20	R+20.7	D+0.7	
2004 IN governor	Joseph Kernan	42	45.5	Mitch Daniels	48	53.2	R+6	R+7.7	D+1.7	
2006 IA governor	Chet Culver	52	54.1	Jim Nussle	43	44.4	D+9	D+9.7	R+0.7	
2006 IA-01 U.S. House	Bruce Braley	56	55.1	Mike Whalen	35	43.3	D+21	D+11.9	D+9.2	
2006 IN-07 U.S. House	Julia Carson	42	53.8	Eric Dickerson	45	46.2	R+3	D+7.5	R+10.5	
2006 MI U.S. Senate	Debbie Stabenow	53	56.9	Mike Bouchard	34	41.3	D+19	D+15.7	D+3.4	
2006 MI governor	Jennifer Granholm	54	56.4	Dick DeVos	41	42.3	D+13	D+14.1	R+1.1	
2008 IA president	Barack Obama	54	54.2	John McCain	37	44.6	D+17	D+9.6	D+7.4	
2008 IA U.S. Senate	Tom Harkin	57	62.7	Christopher Reed	31	37.3	D+26	D+25.4	D+0.6	
2008 IN president	Barack Obama	46	50.0	John McCain	45	48.9	D+1.0	D+1.0	D+0.0	
2008 IN governor	Jill Long Thompson	36	40.0	Mitch Daniels	54	57.8	R+18	R+17.8	R+0.2	
2008 MI president	Barack Obama	53	57.4	John McCain	37	41.0	D+16	D+16.5	R+0.5	
2008 MI U.S. Senate	Carl Levin	53	62.7	Jack Hoogendyk	32	33.9	D+21	D+28.8	R+7.8	
2010 IA U.S. Senate	Roxanne Conlin	30	33.3	Chuck Grassley	61	64.4	R+31	R+31.1	D+0.1	
2010 IA governor	Chet Culver	38	43.3	Terry Branstad	50	52.9	R+12	R+9.6	R+2.4	
2012 IA president	Barack Obama	47	52.2	Mitt Romney	42	46.4	D+5	D+5.8	R+0.8	
2014 IA U.S. Senate	Bruce Braley	44	43.8	Joni Ernst	51	52.2	R+7	R+8.4	D+1.4	
2014 IA governor	Jack Hatch	35	37.3	Terry Branstad	59	59.1	R+24	R+21.7	R+2.3	
2016 U.S. president	Hillary Clinton	46	48.5	Donald Trump	43	46.4	D+3	D+2.1	D+0.9	
2016 FL president	Hillary Clinton	45	47.8	Donald Trump	46	49.0	R+1	R+1.2	D+0.2	
2016 FL U.S. Senate	Patrick Murphy	41	44.3	Marco Rubio	51	52.0	R+10	R+7.7	R+2.3	
2016 IA president	Hillary Clinton	39	42.2	Donald Trump	46	51.8	R+7	R+9.5	D+2.5	
2016 IA U.S. Senate	Patty Judge	33	35.7	Chuck Grassley	56	60.2	R+23	R+24.5	D+1.5	
2018 IA governor	Fred Hubbell	46	47.5	Kim Reynolds	44	50.3	D+2	R+2.7	D+4.7	
2020 IA president	Joe Biden	41	45.0	Donald Trump	48	53.2	R+7	R+8.2	D+1.2	
2020 IA U.S. Senate	Theresa Greenfield	42	45.2	Joni Ernst	46	51.8	R+4	R+6.6	D+2.6	
2022 IA U.S. Senate	Michael Franken	41	43.9	Chuck Grassley	53	56.1	R+12	R+12.2	D+0.2	
2022 IA governor	Deidre DeJear	37	39.6	Kim Reynolds	54	58.1	R+17	R+18.5	D+1.5	
2024 IA president	Kamala Harris	47	42.7	Donald Trump	44	55.9	D+3	R+13.2	D+16.2	
