= 1998 Iowa gubernatorial election =

- November 3, 1998
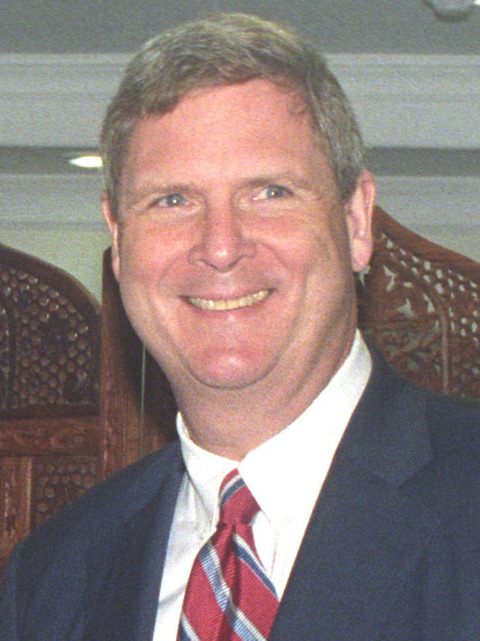

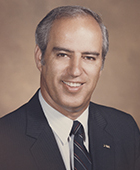
Nominee	Tom Vilsack	Jim Ross Lightfoot
Party	Democratic	Republican
Running mate	Sally Pederson	Enola "Almo" Hawkins
Popular vote	500,231	444,787
Percentage	52.30%	46.51%
- County results Vilsack: 40–50% 50–60% 60–70% Lightfoot: 40–50% 50–60% 60–70% 70–80% 80–90%
Governor before election
Terry Branstad
Republican
Elected Governor
Tom Vilsack
Democratic

The 1998 Iowa gubernatorial election took place on November 3, 1998. Incumbent Republican Governor Terry Branstad did not seek re-election to a fifth consecutive term; he later successfully ran again in 2010 and 2014.

To replace him, State Senator Tom Vilsack narrowly won the nomination of the Democratic Party while former United States Congressman Jim Ross Lightfoot, who was previously the Republican nominee for the United States Senate in 1996, won his party's nomination. Lightfoot was the odds-on favorite to win and polling consistently showed him in the lead, but Vilsack won the general election in a stunning upset, becoming the first Democrat to serve as governor of Iowa since 1969 and the 5th Democrat to hold the office in the 20th century. Lightfoot never conceded defeat.

== Democratic primary ==
=== Candidates ===
- Tom Vilsack, state senator from Mount Pleasant
- Mark McCormick, former justice of the Iowa Supreme Court (1972–86)

=== Results ===
Primary results by county: Vilsack: Vilsack—91-100%; Vilsack—81-90%; Vilsack—71-80%; Vilsack—61-70%; Vilsack—51-60%; McCormick: McCormick—81-90%; McCormick—71-80%; McCormick—61-70%; McCormick—51-60%; McCormick—41-50%; Tie: Tie between Vilsack and McCormick-49%

Democratic primary results
Party	Candidate	Votes	%
Democratic	Tom Vilsack	59,130	51.20
Democratic	Mark McCormick	55,950	48.45
Democratic	Write-ins	410	0.36
Total votes		115,490	100.00

== Republican primary ==
=== Candidates ===
- Jim Ross Lightfoot, former U.S. representative from Shenandoah and 1996 U.S. Senate nominee
- David A. Oman, telecommunications executive and chief of staff to Terry Branstad
- Paul Pate, secretary of state of Iowa

=== Results ===
Republican primary results
Party	Candidate	Votes	%
Republican	Jim Ross Lightfoot	113,499	69.89
Republican	David A. Oman	35,402	21.80
Republican	Paul Pate	13,299	8.19
Republican	Write-ins	193	0.12
Total votes		162,393	100.00

== Reform Party primary ==
=== Candidates ===
- Jim Hennager
- Edward Moses
- Jeffrey L. Hughes Sr.

=== Results ===
Reform Party primary results
Party	Candidate	Votes	%
Reform	Jim Hennager	131	35.60
Reform	Edward Moses	99	26.90
Reform	Jeffrey L. Hughes, Sr.	99	26.90
Reform	Write-ins	39	10.60
Total votes		368	100.00

== General election ==
=== Candidates ===
- Jim Hennager (Reform)
- Mark Kennis (Independent)
- Jim Ross Lightfoot, former U.S. representative from Shenandoah and 1996 U.S. Senate nominee (Republican)
- Jim Schaefer (Natural Law)
- Tom Vilsack, state senator from Mount Pleasant (Democratic)

=== Polling ===
Poll source	Date(s)	Sample size (Note: Key: A – all adults RV – registered voters LV – likely voters V – unclear)	Margin of error	Jimm Lightfoot (R)	Tom Vilsack (D)	Other / undecided (Note: Calculated by taking the difference of 100% and all other candidates combined.)
Selzer & Co. (Note: Poll sponsored by The Des Moines Register)	October 28–30, 1998	800 (LV)	± 3.5%	47%	43%	10%
Mason-Dixon Polling & Strategy	October 25–27, 1998	803 (LV)	± 3.5%	47%	42%	11%
Talmey-Drake Research & Strategy Inc. (D) (Note: Poll conducted for an unspecified Democratic sponsor.)	October 26, 1998	408	—	44%	44%	12%
Talmey-Drake Research & Strategy Inc. (D)	October 20, 1998	408	—	46%	44%	10%
Talmey-Drake Research & Strategy Inc. (D)	October 14, 1998	408	—	48%	40%	12%
Mason-Dixon Polling & Strategy	October 11–13, 1998	809 (LV)	± 3.5%	53%	35%	12%
Mason-Dixon Polling & Strategy	September 12–14, 1998	804 (LV)	± 3.5%	54%	32%	14%
Mason-Dixon Polling & Strategy	July 18–21, 1998	834 (LV)	± 3.5%	54%	31%	15%
Selzer & Co.	June 20–24, 1998	581 (LV)	± 4.0%	53%	32%	15%
Mason-Dixon Polling & Strategy	May 25–27, 1998	837 (LV)	± 3.5%	55%	21%	24%

=== Results ===
Iowa gubernatorial election, 1998
Party	Candidate	Votes	%	±%
Democratic	Tom Vilsack	500,231	52.30%	+10.74%
Republican	Jim Ross Lightfoot	444,787	46.51%	−10.29%
Reform	Jim Hennager	5,606	0.59%	
Natural Law	Jim Schaefer	3,144	0.33%	−0.05%
Independent	Mark Kennis	2,006	0.21%	
Write-in		641	0.07%	
Majority		55,444	5.80%	−9.44%
Turnout		956,415		
Democratic gain from Republican		Swing		

== See also ==
- 1998 United States gubernatorial elections
- State of Iowa
- Governors of Iowa

== Notes ==
Partisan clients
