= Tom Tauke =

American politician (born 1950)

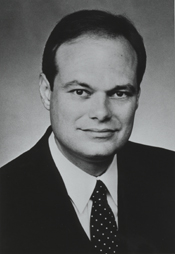

Member of the U.S. House of Representatives from Iowa's 2nd district
- In office January 3, 1979 – January 3, 1991
- Preceded by: Mike Blouin
- Succeeded by: Jim Nussle

Member of the Iowa House of Representatives from the 20th district
- In office January 13, 1975 – January 2, 1979
- Preceded by: Robert Carr
- Succeeded by: Michael Connolly

Personal details
- Born: Thomas Joseph Tauke; October 11, 1950 (age 75) Dubuque, Iowa, U.S.
- Party: Republican
- Spouse: Beverly Tauke
- Children: 2
- Education: Loras College (BA); University of Iowa (JD)

Thomas Joseph Tauke (born October 11, 1950) is an American politician, lawyer, and corporate executive from Iowa. He is a former member of the U.S. House of Representatives, serving six terms from 1979 to 1991.

== Biography ==
Tauke's undergraduate degree was earned at Loras College in Dubuque, Iowa, and his Juris Doctor degree was earned at the University of Iowa College of Law in 1974.

Prior to entering the House, he had served as a lawyer. He was also a two-term member of the Iowa House of Representatives from 1975 to 1979.

=== Congress ===
Tauke represented Iowa's 2nd congressional district from 1979 to 1991 as a Republican, entering Congress as one of its youngest members. Tauke ran unsuccessfully for the U.S. Senate in 1990, losing to incumbent Democrat Tom Harkin by a margin of 54%–45%. He was succeeded in the U.S. House by fellow Republican Jim Nussle.

=== Later career ===
From 1991 to 2013 he served as executive vice president for public affairs, policy and communications of Verizon. He has made recent news with his statements in opposition to the Net Neutrality Bill, which has been a recent source of debate among internet users. As a spokesman for Verizon, one of the main opponents of the bill, Tauke has expressed his discontent with Net Neutrality.

=== Retirement ===
Since retiring from Verizon, he has served on many boards and committees (both non-profit and for-profit) and is past chair of the board of regents of Loras College and the Washington Center.

He resides in Alexandria, Virginia, with his wife Beverly and children Joseph and Elizabeth. He serves on the board of directors of the Committee for a Responsible Federal Budget.

U.S. House of Representatives
| Preceded by Mike Blouin | Member of the U.S. House of Representatives from Iowa's 2nd congressional district 1979–1991 | Succeeded by Jim Nussle |
Party political offices
| Preceded by Roger Jepsen | Republican nominee for U.S. Senator from Iowa (Class 2); 1990 | Succeeded by Jim Ross Lightfoot |
U.S. order of precedence (ceremonial)
| Preceded by Pete Olson as Former U.S. Representative | Order of precedence of the United States as Former U.S. Representative | Succeeded by Jim Ross Lightfoot as Former U.S. Representative |
