= 2020 United States presidential election in Iowa =

- November 3, 2020
- Turnout: 75.77% (▲3.0 pp)

Nominee	Donald Trump	Joe Biden
Party	Republican	Democratic
Home state	Florida	Delaware
Running mate	Mike Pence	Kamala Harris
Electoral vote	6	0
Popular vote	897,672	759,061
Percentage	53.09%	44.89%

Trump
40–50%
50–60%
60–70%
70–80%
80–90%
90–100%
Biden
40–50%
50–60%
60–70%
70–80%
80–90%
90–100%
Tie
President before election
Donald Trump
Republican
Elected President
Joe Biden
Democratic

The 2020 United States presidential election in Iowa was held on Tuesday, November 3, 2020, as part of the 2020 United States presidential election in which all 50 states plus the District of Columbia participated. Iowa voters chose electors to represent them in the Electoral College via a popular vote, pitting the Republican nominee, incumbent President Donald Trump of Florida, and his running mate Vice President Mike Pence of Indiana, against Democratic nominee, former Vice President Joe Biden of Delaware, and his running mate California Senator Kamala Harris. Iowa has six electoral votes in the Electoral College.

Trump won the state 53.1% to Biden's 44.9%. Prior to this election, most news organizations had considered Iowa as either leaning towards Trump or a tossup. As was the case in Ohio, this election confirmed Iowa's trend from a Midwestern swing state toward the GOP column, the same trend as neighboring Missouri starting in 2008. Iowa had voted Democratic in six of seven elections prior to 2016, the exception being George W. Bush's narrow plurality win in 2004. In 2016, however, Iowa voted for Trump by an unexpectedly large margin of 9.4%, voting over ten points to the right of the nation overall, indicating a possible realignment of the previously Democratic-leaning state towards the GOP, much as in the case of West Virginia in 2000 and 2004. Even though Biden contested the state, Trump ended up carrying it by only a slightly reduced margin of 8.2% even as his national margin of defeat grew by 2.4%, meaning that the state voted even further to the right of the national average than it did in 2016.

This marked the first time since 2000 that the state voted for the national loser, and the first since 1988 that it voted for the loser of the popular and electoral vote. Biden improved on Hillary Clinton's margins in the Des Moines and Cedar Rapids metropolitan areas and traditionally conservative western Iowa, the latter of which borders Nebraska's 2nd congressional district (Omaha metropolitan area), an electoral vote Trump won in 2016 but lost in 2020. Trump improved on his 2016 performance in populist northeast and south Iowa and became the first Republican to win Iowa in back-to-back elections since Ronald Reagan in 1980 and 1984. Biden also became the first Democrat to be elected president without winning Iowa since Jimmy Carter in 1976. This is also the first time since 2004 that Iowa voted for a different candidate than neighboring Wisconsin.

Iowa is one of only three states that voted twice for Barack Obama and thrice for Trump, the other two being Florida and Ohio.

== Caucuses ==
The state's caucuses, traditionally the first major electoral event in the country, were held on February 3, 2020.

=== Republican caucuses ===
Incumbent president Donald Trump received about 97 percent of the votes in the Republican caucuses, and received 39 of the Republican delegates, while Bill Weld received enough votes to clinch one delegate.

Counties won by these popular vote results
Map legend
- Trump—100%
- Trump—≥95%
- Trump—90–95%
- Trump—85–90%

Congressional districts won by these popular vote results
Map legend
- Trump—≥95%

2020 Iowa Republican presidential caucuses
Candidate	Votes	%	Estimated delegates
Donald Trump (incumbent)	31,421	97.14	39
Bill Weld	425	1.31	1
Joe Walsh	348	1.08	0
Other	151	0.47	0
Total	32,345	100%	40

=== Democratic caucuses ===
After a three-day delay in votes being reported, the Iowa Democratic Party declared that Pete Buttigieg had narrowly won the state delegate equivalent (SDE) count of the Democratic caucuses with 26.2 percent. Bernie Sanders came in second with 26.1 percent of the SDEs, despite the fact that he received more popular votes (26.5 percent) than Buttigieg (25.1 percent). Elizabeth Warren, Joe Biden, and Amy Klobuchar finished in third, fourth, and fifth place, respectively.

2020 Iowa Democratic presidential caucuses
Candidate	Initial alignment		Final alignment (Note: Final vote after votes for candidates below the 15% viability threshold in each precinct are reallocated to other viable candidates.)		State delegate equivalents (Note: The official results included four decimal digits.)		Pledged national convention delegates (Note: In Iowa, the presidential caucuses only are the first determining step for the delegate distribution, the final step are the decisions on the district conventions and the much later state convention. According to the provisions set by the Iowa Democratic Party's "Delegate Selection Plan", statewide delegates preliminarily awarded to other candidates had to be reallocated at the state convention on June 13, as their pledged candidates had dropped out, while the already early decided district delegates remain fixed.)
Candidate	Votes	%	Votes	%	Number	%	Pledged national convention delegates
Pete Buttigieg	37,572	21.31	43,209	25.08	562.95	26.17	(Note: Due to his withdrawal in March, 2 of the 5 statewide delegates mathematically won by Buttigieg were reallocated to Biden at the state convention on June 13.)14
Bernie Sanders	43,581	24.71	45,652	26.50	562.02	26.13	(Note: Due to his withdrawal in April, 3 of the 4 statewide delegates mathematically won by Sanders were reallocated to Biden at the state convention on June 13.)12
Elizabeth Warren	32,589	18.48	34,909	20.26	388.44	18.06	(Note: Due to her withdrawal in March, all of the 3 statewide delegates mathematically won by Warren were reallocated to Biden at the state convention on June 13.)8
Joe Biden	26,291	14.91	23,605	13.70	340.32	15.82	(Note: 8 of the 12 statewide delegates initially awarded to Buttigieg (2), Sanders (3) and Warren (3), who had withdrawn in the meantime, were reallocated to Biden as the sole remaining viable contender and were added to his own 2 statewide delegates at the state convention on June 13.)6
Amy Klobuchar	22,454	12.73	21,100	12.25	263.87	12.27	1
Andrew Yang	8,914	5.05	1,758	1.02	21.86	1.02	
Tom Steyer	3,061	1.74	413	0.24	6.62	0.31	
Michael Bloomberg (did not run yet) (Note: Michael Bloomberg officially announced his candidacy for the Democratic nomination on November 24, 2019, but chose not to contest the first four nominating contests of the primary season, including the Iowa caucuses.)	212	0.12	16	0.01	0.21	0.01	
Tulsi Gabbard	341	0.19	16	0.01	0.11	0.01	
Michael Bennet	164	0.09	4	0.00	0.00	0.00	
Deval Patrick	9	0.01	0	0.00	0.00	0.00	
John Delaney (withdrawn)	0	0.00	0	0.00	0.00	0.00	
Other	155	0.09	198	0.11	0.69	0.03	
Uncommitted	1,009	0.57	1,420	0.82	3.73	0.17	
Total (Note: Per the Iowa Democratic Party official report.)	176,352	100%	172,300	100%	2,150.83	100%	41

=== Libertarian caucuses ===
2020 Iowa Libertarian presidential caucuses
- February 8, 2020
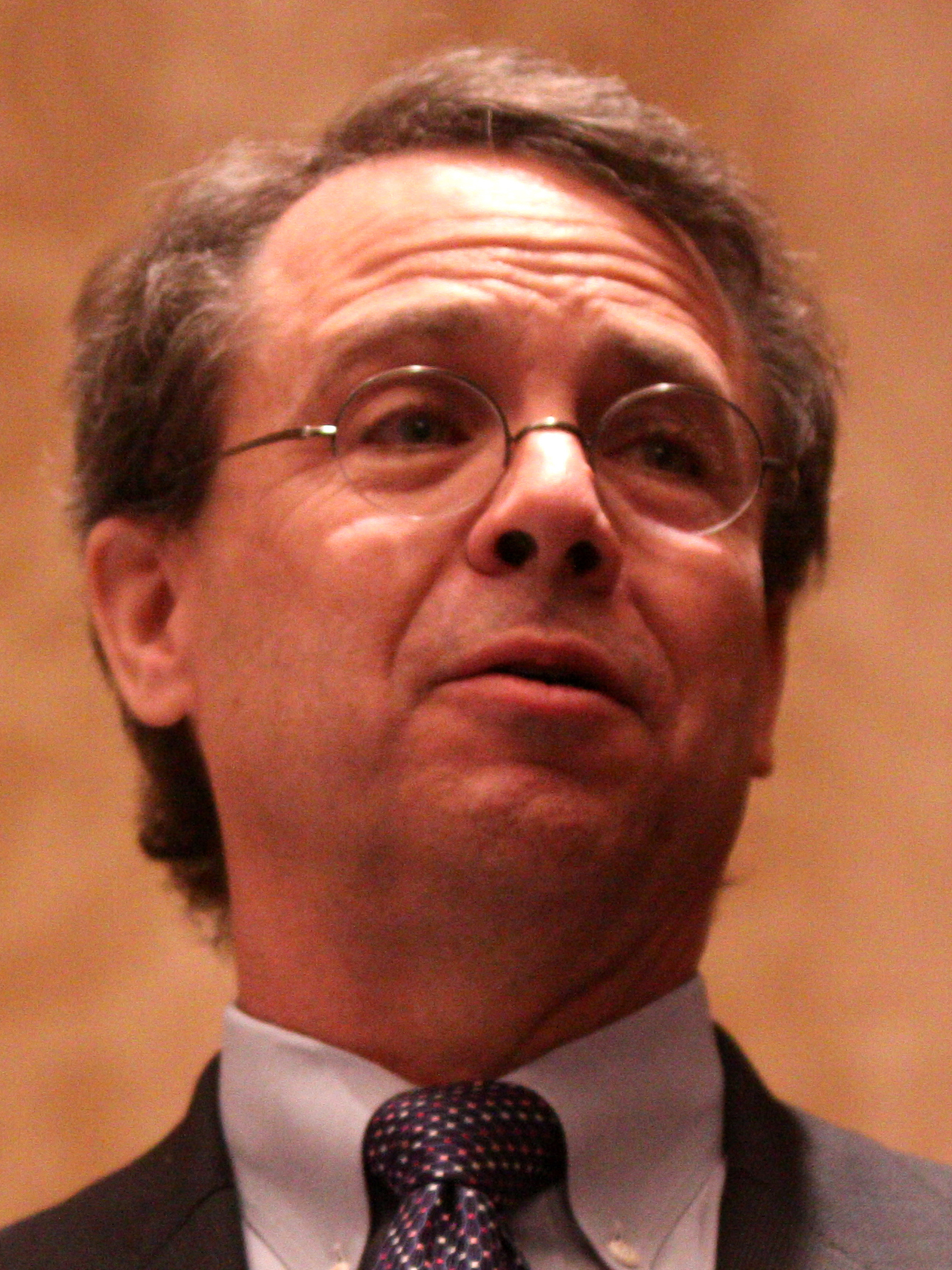

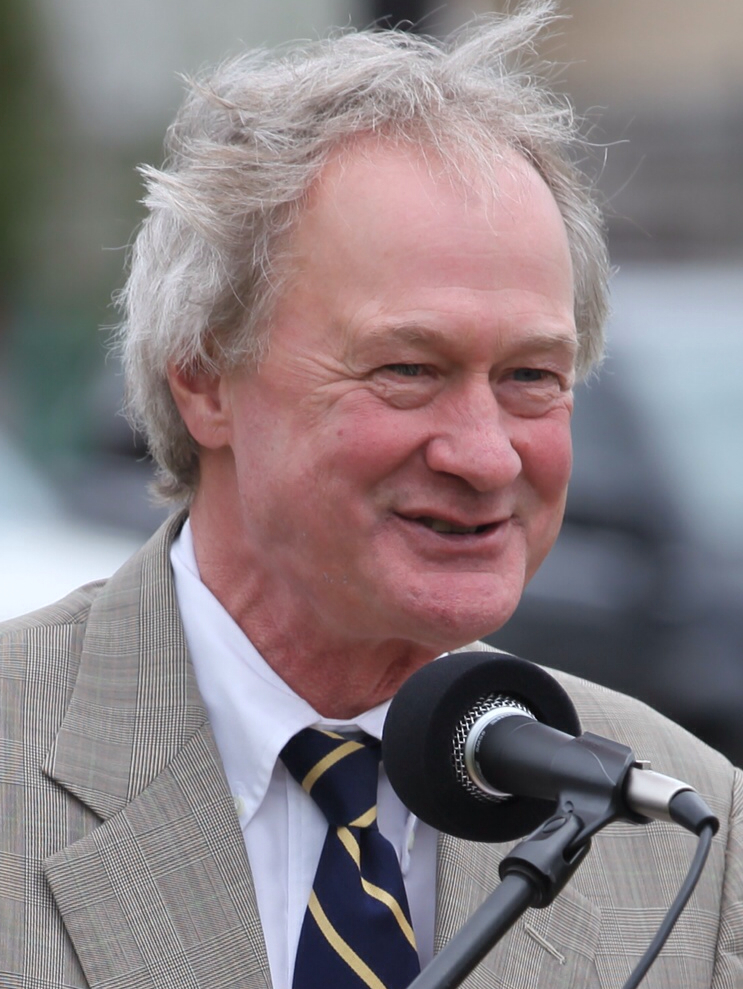

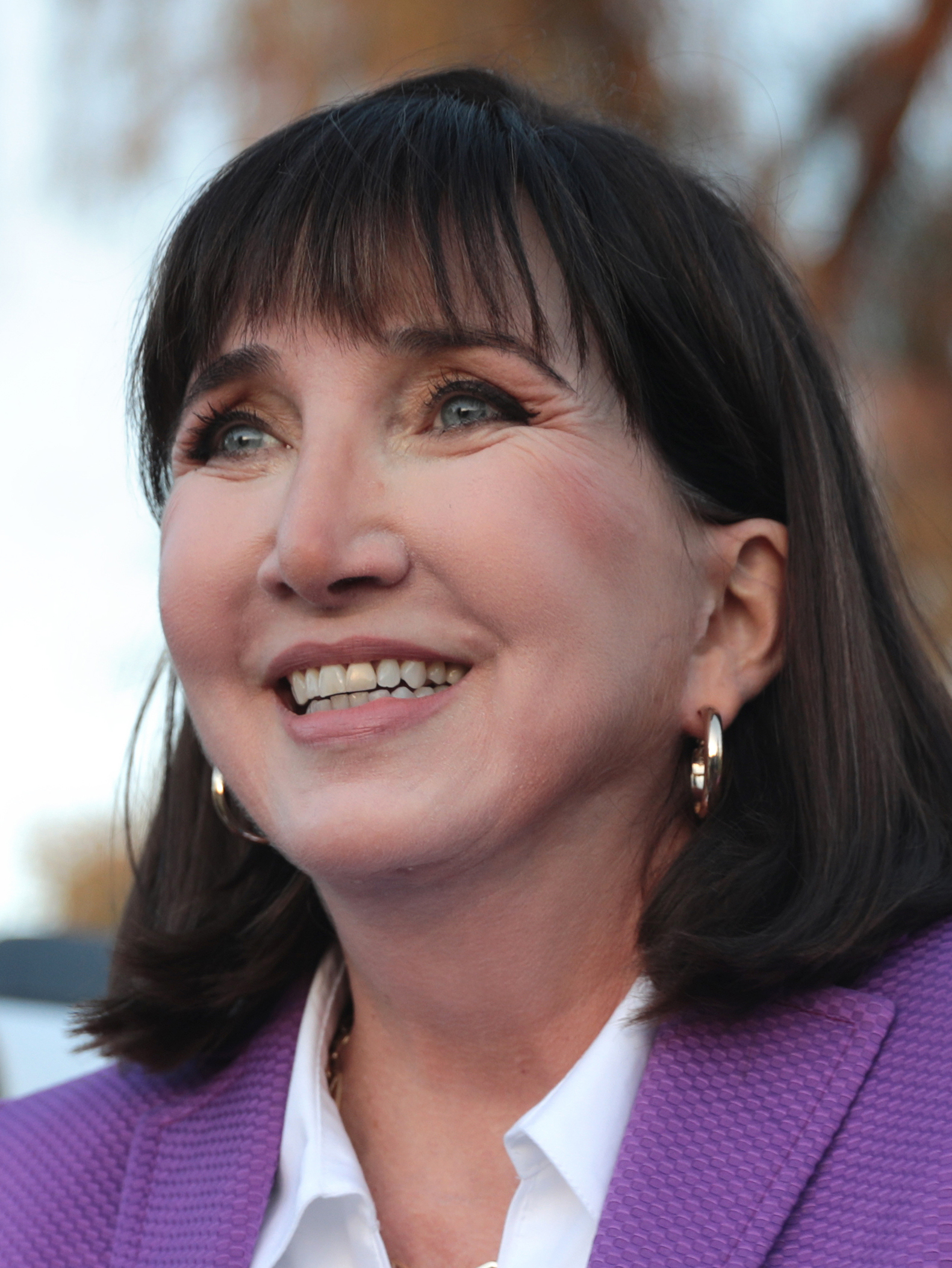

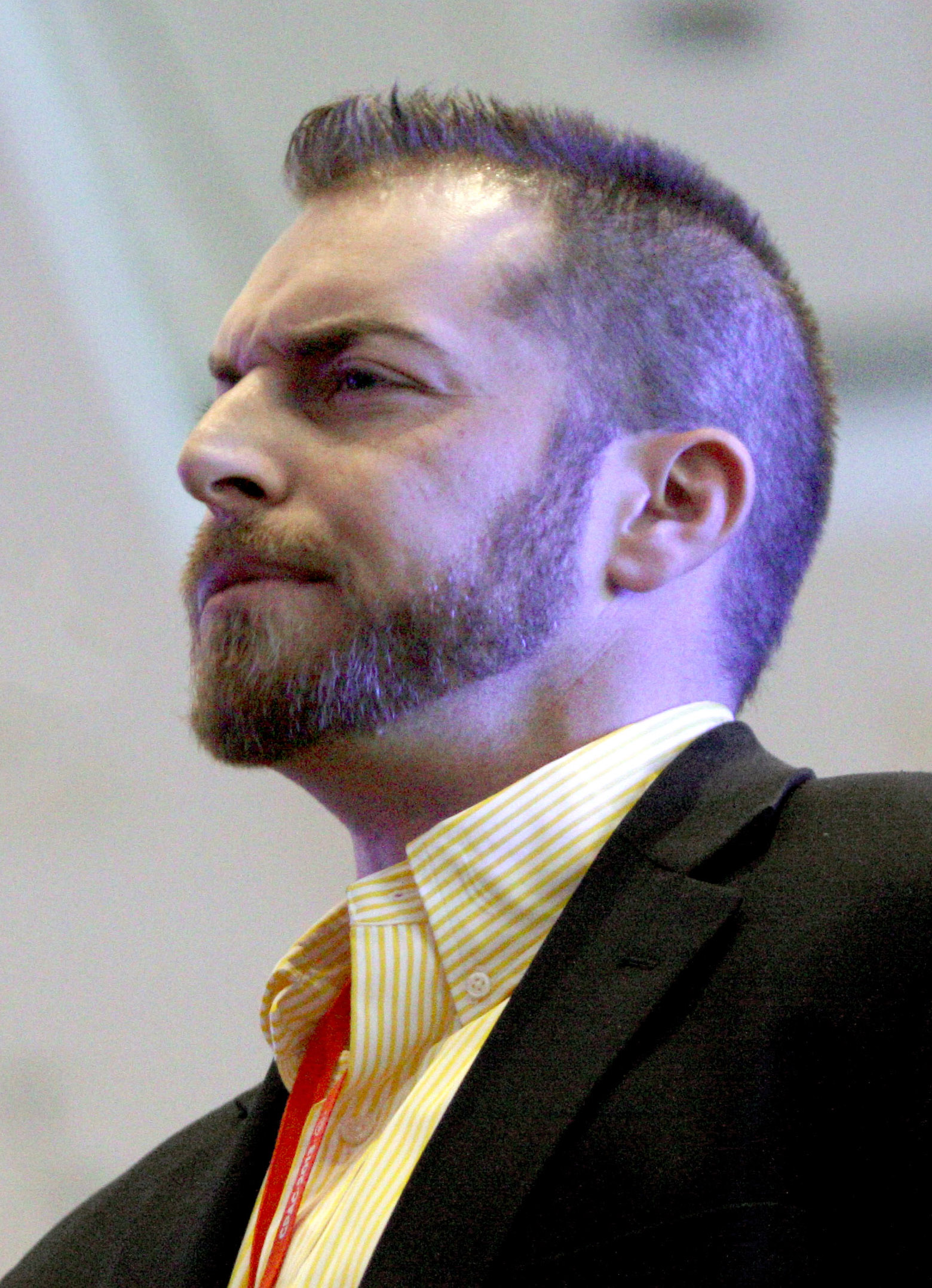
Candidate	Jacob Hornberger	Lincoln Chafee
Home state	Virginia	Wyoming
Popular vote	133	36
Percentage	47.52%	12.77%
Candidate	Jo Jorgensen	Adam Kokesh
Home state	South Carolina	Indiana
Popular vote	18	17
Percentage	6.38%	6.03%
Election results by county
Jacob Hornberger Lincoln Chafee Jo Jorgensen Adam Kokesh Dan Behrman John McAfee	Vermin Supreme Sam Robb Ken Armstrong Tie No votes

Iowa Libertarian presidential caucus, February 8, 2020
Candidate	Votes	Percentage
Jacob Hornberger	133	47.52%
Lincoln Chafee	36	12.77%
Jo Jorgensen	18	6.38%
Adam Kokesh	17	6.03%
Dan Behrman	14	4.96%
John McAfee	10	3.55%
Vermin Supreme	9	3.19%
Other (write-in)	8	2.84%
None of the above	8	2.84%
Sam Robb	7	2.48%
Max Abramson	6	2.13%
Mark Whitney	4	1.42%
Arvin Vohra	3	1.06%
Ken Armstrong	2	0.71%
Souraya Faas	2	0.71%
Benjamin Leder	1	0.35%
John Monds	1	0.35%
Total	281	100%

The Libertarian Party of Iowa conducted their own caucuses on February 8, offering in-person caucus locations and an online virtual caucus. Only registered Libertarian voters were eligible to participate.

== General election ==
=== Final predictions ===
Source	Ranking
The Cook Political Report	Tossup
Inside Elections	Tossup
Sabato's Crystal Ball	Lean R
Politico	Tossup
RCP	Tossup
Niskanen	Tossup
CNN	Tossup
The Economist	Tossup
CBS News	Tossup
270towin	Tossup
ABC News	Tossup
NPR	Tossup
NBC News	Tossup
538	Lean R

=== Polling ===
View source data.

Aggregate polls

Source of poll aggregation	Dates administered	Dates updated	Joe Biden Democratic	Donald Trump Republican	Other/ Undecided (Note: Calculated by taking the difference of 100% and all other candidates combined.)	Margin
270 to Win	October 31 – November 2, 2020	November 3, 2020	46.2%	47.8%	6.0%	Trump +1.6
Real Clear Politics	October 23 – November 2, 2020	November 3, 2020	45.6%	47.6%	6.8%	Trump +2.0
FiveThirtyEight	until November 2, 2020	November 3, 2020	46.3%	47.6%	6.1%	Trump +1.3
Average			46.0%	47.7%	6.3%	Trump +1.5

Polls

Poll source	Date(s) administered	Sample size (Note: Key: A – all adults RV – registered voters LV – likely voters V – unclear)	Margin of error	Donald Trump Republican	Joe Biden Democratic	Jo Jorgensen Libertarian	Howie Hawkins Green	Other	Undecided
Public Policy Polling	Nov 1–2, 2020	871 (V)	–	48%	49%	–	–	2% (Note: "Someone else" with 2%)	1%
SurveyMonkey/Axios	Oct 20 – Nov 2, 2020	1,489 (LV)	± 3.5%	51% (Note: Overlapping sample with the previous SurveyMonkey/Axios poll, but more information available regarding sample size)	48%	–	–	–	–
Change Research	Oct 29 – Nov 1, 2020	1,084 (LV)	± 3.2%	47%	47%	3%	0%	2% (Note: "Don't recall" with 2%)	1%
Civiqs/Daily Kos	Oct 29 – Nov 1, 2020	853 (LV)	± 3.7%	48%	49%	–	–	3% (Note: "Someone else" with 3%)	0%
Data for Progress	Oct 27 – Nov 1, 2020	951 (LV)	± 3.2%	49%	47%	3%	1%	1% (Note: "Other candidate or write-in" with 1%)	–
Emerson College	Oct 29–31, 2020	604 (LV)	± 3.9%	49% (Note: With voters who lean towards a given candidate)	47%	–	–	4%	0%
InsiderAdvantage/Center for American Greatness (Note: The Center for American Greatness is a pro-Trump organization)	October 30, 2020	400 (LV)	± 4.9%	48%	46%	1%	–	–	6%
Selzer & Co./Des Moines Register	Oct 26–29, 2020	814 (LV)	± 3.4%	48%	41%	–	–	8% (Note: "Refused" with 5%; "Someone else" with 3%; would not vote with 0%)	2% (Note: Includes "Do not remember")
SurveyMonkey/Axios	Oct 1–28, 2020	3,005 (LV)	± 2.5%	50%	49%	–	–	–	2%
Quinnipiac University	Oct 23–27, 2020	1,225 (LV)	± 2.8%	47%	46%	–	–	1% (Note: "Someone else" with 1%)	6%
RABA Research/WHO13 News	Oct 21–24, 2020	693 (LV)	± 4%	46%	50%	–	–	2%	1%
Emerson College	Oct 19–21, 2020	435 (LV)	± 4.7%	48%	48%	–	–	4% (Note: "Someone else" with 4%)	0%
RMG Research/PoliticalIQ	Oct 15–21, 2020	800 (LV)	± 3.5%	47% (Note: Standard VI response)	47%	–	–	2%	4%
RMG Research/PoliticalIQ	Oct 15–21, 2020	800 (LV)	± 3.5%	45% (Note: Results generated with high Democratic turnout model)	49%	–	–	2%	4%
RMG Research/PoliticalIQ	Oct 15–21, 2020	800 (LV)	± 3.5%	49% (Note: Results generated with high Republican turnout model)	48%	–	–	2%	4%
Siena College/NYT Upshot	Oct 18–20, 2020	753 (LV)	± 3.9%	43%	46%	2%	1%	1% (Note: "Someone else" with 1%; would not vote with 0%)	7% (Note: Includes "Refused")
Insider Advantage/Center for American Greatness	Oct 18–19, 2020	400 (LV)	± 4.9%	45%	45%	2%	–	–	8%
Monmouth University	Oct 15–19, 2020	501 (RV)	± 4.4%	48%	47%	1%	0% (Note: No voters)	2% (Note: "Another candidate" and "No one" with 1%)	2%
Monmouth University	Oct 15–19, 2020	501 (LV) (Note: With a likely voter turnout model featuring higher turnout than in the 2016 presidential election)	± 4.4%	47%	50%	–	–	–	–
Monmouth University	Oct 15–19, 2020	501 (LV) (Note: With a likely voter turnout model featuring lower turnout than in the 2016 presidential election)	± 4.4%	46%	51%	–	–	–	–
David Binder Research/Focus on Rural America	Oct 10–13, 2020	200 (LV)	–	50%	44%	–	–	–	–
Data for Progress (D)	Oct 8–11, 2020	822 (LV)	± 3.4%	48%	47%	2%	0%	–	3%
YouGov/CBS	Oct 6–9, 2020	1,035 (LV)	± 3.5%	49%	49%	–	–	2% (Note: "Other third party" with 2%)	0%
Opinion Insight/American Action Forum (Note: The American Action Forum is a 501 organization which usually supports Republican candidates)	Oct 5–8, 2020	800 (LV)	± 3.46%	46%	47%	–	–	3% (Note: "One of the other candidates" with 2%; West (B) with 1%)	4%
Civiqs/Daily Kos	Oct 3–6, 2020	756 (LV)	± 3.9%	47%	48%	–	–	4%	1%
Quinnipiac University	Oct 1–5, 2020	1,205 (LV)	± 2.8%	45%	50%	–	–	2%	3%
SurveyMonkey/Axios	Sep 1–30, 2020	1,276 (LV)	–	52%	46%	–	–	–	2%
Data for Progress (D)	Sep 23–28, 2020	743 (LV)	± 3.6%	47%	44%	1%	1%	–	6%
Data for Progress (D)	Sep 23–28, 2020	743 (LV)	± 3.6%	50% (Note: If the only candidates were Biden and Trump)	45%	–	–	–	5%
Hart Research Associates/Human Rights Campaign (Note: The Human Rights Campaign endorsed Biden prior to this poll's sampling period)	Sep 24–27, 2020	400 (LV)	± 4.9%	49%	47%	–	–	–	–
RABA Research/WHO13 News	Sep 23–26, 2020	780 (LV)	± 4%	46%	48%	–	–	2% (Note: "Other candidate" with 2%)	4%
Monmouth University	Sep 18–22, 2020	402 (RV)	± 4.9%	50%	44%	2%	0%	1% (Note: "Another candidate" with 1%; "No one" with no voters)	2%
Monmouth University	Sep 18–22, 2020	402 (LV)	± 4.9%	49%	46%	2%	–	2% (Note: "Hawkins/Other" with 2%)	2%
Monmouth University	Sep 18–22, 2020	402 (LV)	± 4.9%	49%	46%	2%	–	2%	2%
Siena College/NYT Upshot	Sep 16–22, 2020	501 (LV)	± 4.99%	42%	45%	2%	0%	1%	10%
Selzer & Co./Des Moines Register	Sep 14–17, 2020	658 (LV)	± 3.8%	47%	47%	–	–	4%	3%
Fabrizio Ward/Hart Research Associates/AARP	Aug 30 – Sep 5, 2020	800 (LV)	± 3.5%	47%	45%	–	–	1% (Note: Would not vote with 1%)	6%
Opinion Insight/American Action Forum	Aug 30 – Sep 2, 2020	800 (LV)	± 3.46%	51%	43%	3%	1%	–	2%
SurveyMonkey/Axios	Aug 1–31, 2020	983 (LV)	–	53%	46%	–	–	–	2%
Monmouth University	Jul 30 – Aug 3, 2020	401 (RV)	± 4.9%	48%	45%	3%	–	<1% (Note: "Other" and "No-one" with <1%)	3%
Monmouth University	Jul 30 – Aug 3, 2020	401 (LV)	± 4.9%	48%	46%	2%	–	<1% (Note: "Other" with <1%)	3%
Monmouth University	Jul 30 – Aug 3, 2020	401 (LV)	± 4.9%	47%	47%	2%	–	0% (Note: "Other" with 0%)	3%
Data for Progress	Jul 24 – Aug 2, 2020	1,101 (LV)	–	44%	42%	3%	1%	–	10%
Data for Progress	Jul 24 – Aug 2, 2020	1,101 (LV)	–	46%	45%	–	–	–	9%
David Binder Research/Focus on Rural America	Jul 30–31, 2020	200 (LV)	–	43%	49%	–	–	–	–
SurveyMonkey/Axios	Jul 1–31, 2020	1,095 (LV)	–	54%	45%	–	–	–	1%
RMG Research	Jul 27–30, 2020	500 (RV)	± 4.5%	41%	40%	–	–	7%	13%
Public Policy Polling/AFSCME (Note: AFSCME endorsed Biden prior to this poll's sampling period)	Jul 23–24, 2020	1,118 (V)	–	48%	47%	–	–	–	6%
Spry Strategies/American Principles Project (Note: This poll's sponsor is the American Principles Project, a 501(c)(4) organization that supports the Republican Party.)	Jul 11–16, 2020	701 (LV)	± 3.7%	46%	48%	–	–	–	7%
SurveyMonkey/Axios	Jun 8–30, 2020	455 (LV)	–	50%	48%	–	–	–	2%
Selzer/Des Moines Register	Jun 7–10, 2020	674 (LV)	± 3.8%	44%	43%	–	–	10% (Note: "Someone else" with 9%; would not vote with 1%)	3%
Civiqs/Daily Kos	Jun 6–8, 2020	865 (RV)	± 3.8%	46%	46%	–	–	7% (Note: "Someone else" with 7%)	1%
Public Policy Polling/Emily's List (Note: Emily's List is an organization that supports Democratic female candidates)	Jun 3–4, 2020	963 (V)	–	48%	47%	–	–	–	5%
Public Policy Polling	Apr 30 – May 1, 2020	1,222 (V)	± 2.8%	48%	46%	–	–	–	6%
GBAO Strategies/PLUS Paid Family Leave	Apr 13–16, 2020	500 (LV)	–	48%	45%	–	–	1%	6%
Selzer/Des Moines Register	Mar 2–5, 2020	667 (LV)	± 3.8%	51%	41%	–	–	–	–
The New York Times/Siena College	Jan 20–23, 2020	1,689 (RV)	± 2.8%	46%	44%	–	–	5% (Note: Other with 2%; would not vote with 3%)	6%
Public Policy Polling	Dec 29–31, 2019	964 (V)	–	49%	46%	–	–	–	5%
Emerson College	Dec 7–10, 2019	1,043 (RV)	± 3%	49%	45%	–	–	–	6%
NYT Upshot/Siena College	Oct 25–30, 2019	1,435 (RV)	± 3.1%	45%	44%	–	–	3%	5%
Emerson College	Oct 13–16, 2019	888 (RV)	± 3.2%	51%	49%	–	–	–	–
WPA Intelligence (R)	Apr 27–30, 2019	200 (LV)	± 6.9%	49%	44%	–	–	–	5%
Emerson College	Mar 21–24, 2019	707 (RV)	± 3.6%	47%	53%	–	–	–	–
Emerson College	Jan 30 – Feb 2, 2019	831 (RV)	± 3.4%	49%	51%	–	–	–	–

Former candidates

Donald J. Trump vs. Michael Bloomberg

Poll source	Date(s) administered	Sample size	Margin of error	Donald J. Trump (R)	Michael Bloomberg (D)	Other	Undecided
Des Moines Register/Selzer & Co.	Mar 2–5, 2020	667 (LV)	± 3.8%	53% (Note: Additional data sourced from FiveThirtyEight)	34%	–	–
The New York Times/Siena College	Jan 20–23, 2020	1,689 (RV)	± 2.8%	47%	39%	7% (Note: Other with 3%; would not vote with 4%)	8%

Donald J. Trump vs. Cory Booker

Poll source	Date(s) administered	Sample size	Margin of error	Donald J. Trump (R)	Cory Booker (D)	Undecided
Emerson College	Mar 21–24, 2019	707 (RV)	± 3.6%	52%	48%	–

Donald J. Trump vs. Pete Buttigieg

Poll source	Date(s) administered	Sample size	Margin of error	Donald J. Trump (R)	Pete Buttigieg (D)	Other	Undecided
The New York Times/Siena College	Jan 20–23, 2020	1,689 (RV)	± 2.8%	45%	44%	4% (Note: Other with 1%; would not vote with 3%)	7%
Public Policy Polling	Jan 2–4, 2020	964 (V)	–	48%	47%	–	5%
Emerson College	Dec 7–10, 2019	1,043 (RV)	± 3%	46%	45%	–	9%
NYT Upshot/Siena College	Oct 25–30, 2019	1,435 (RV)	± 3.1%	45%	41%	3%	8%

Donald J. Trump vs. Kirsten Gillibrand

Poll source	Date(s) administered	Sample size	Margin of error	Donald J. Trump (R)	Kirsten Gillibrand (D)	Undecided
Emerson College	Jan 30 – Feb 2, 2019	831 (RV)	± 3.4%	54%	46%	–

Donald J. Trump vs. Kamala Harris

Poll source	Date(s) administered	Sample size	Margin of error	Donald J. Trump (R)	Kamala Harris (D)	Undecided
Emerson College	Mar 21–24, 2019	707 (RV)	± 3.6%	54%	46%	–
Emerson College	Jan 30 – Feb 2, 2019	831 (RV)	± 3.4%	53%	47%	–

Donald J. Trump vs. Amy Klobuchar

Poll source	Date(s) administered	Sample size	Margin of error	Donald J. Trump (R)	Amy Klobuchar (D)	Other	Undecided
The New York Times/Siena College	Jan 20–23, 2020	1,689 (RV)	± 2.8%	46%	41%	5%	8%

Donald J. Trump vs. Beto O'Rourke

Poll source	Date(s) administered	Sample size	Margin of error	Donald J. Trump (R)	Beto O'Rourke (D)	Undecided
Emerson College	Jan 30 – Feb 2, 2019	831 (RV)	± 3.4%	53%	47%	–

Donald J. Trump vs. Bernie Sanders

Poll source	Date(s) administered	Sample size	Margin of error	Donald J. Trump (R)	Bernie Sanders (D)	Other	Undecided
Des Moines Register/Selzer & Co.	Mar 2–5, 2020	667 (LV)	± 3.8%	53%	41%	–	–
The New York Times/Siena College	Jan 20–23, 2020	1,689 (RV)	± 2.8%	48%	42%	4% (Note: Other and would not vote with 2%)	6%
Public Policy Polling	Dec 29–31, 2019	964 (V)	–	49%	44%	–	7%
Emerson College	Dec 7–10, 2019	1,043 (RV)	± 3%	50%	43%	–	7%
NYT Upshot/Siena College	Oct 25–30, 2019	1,435 (RV)	± 3.1%	47%	43%	3%	4%
Emerson College	Oct 13–16, 2019	888 (RV)	± 3.2%	49%	51%	–	–
Emerson College	Mar 21–24, 2019	707 (RV)	± 3.6%	49%	51%	–	–
Emerson College	Jan 30 – Feb 2, 2019	831 (RV)	± 3.4%	51%	50%	–	–

Donald J. Trump vs. Elizabeth Warren

Poll source	Date(s) administered	Sample size	Margin of error	Donald J. Trump (R)	Elizabeth Warren (D)	Other	Undecided
Des Moines Register/Selzer & Co.	Mar 2–5, 2020	667 (LV)	± 3.8%	52%	40%	–	–
The New York Times/Siena College	Jan 20–23, 2020	1,689 (RV)	± 2.8%	47%	42%	5%	7%
Public Policy Polling	Jan 2–4, 2020	964 (V)	–	49%	44%	–	7%
Emerson College	Dec 7–10, 2019	1,043 (RV)	± 3%	50%	43%	± 3%	7%
NYT Upshot/Siena College	Oct 25–30, 2019	1,435 (RV)	± 3.1%	47%	40%	2%	7%
Emerson College	Oct 13–16, 2019	888 (RV)	± 3.2%	51%	49%	–	–
Emerson College	Mar 21–24, 2019	707 (RV)	± 3.6%	51%	49%	–	–
Emerson College	Jan 30 – Feb 2, 2019	831 (RV)	± 3.4%	52%	48%	–	–

Hypothetical polling

with Donald J. Trump and Sherrod Brown

Poll source	Date(s) administered	Sample size	Margin of error	Donald J. Trump (R)	Sherrod Brown (D)	Undecided
Emerson College	Jan 30 – Feb 2, 2019	831 (RV)	± 3.4%	55%	46%	–

with Donald J. Trump and Nancy Pelosi

Poll source	Date(s) administered	Sample size	Margin of error	Donald J. Trump (R)	Nancy Pelosi (D)	Undecided
Emerson College	Jan 30 – Feb 2, 2019	831 (RV)	± 3.4%	55%	45%	–

with Donald J. Trump, Bernie Sanders, and Howard Schultz

Poll source	Date(s) administered	Sample size	Margin of error	Donald J. Trump (R)	Bernie Sanders (D)	Howard Schultz (I)	Undecided
Emerson College	Mar 21–24, 2019	707 (RV)	± 3.6%	47%	46%	8%	–

with Donald J. Trump, Elizabeth Warren, and Howard Schultz

Poll source	Date(s) administered	Sample size	Margin of error	Donald J. Trump (R)	Elizabeth Warren (D)	Howard Schultz (I)	Undecided
Emerson College	Mar 21–24, 2019	707 (RV)	± 3.6%	48%	45%	7%	–
Emerson College	Jan 30 – Feb 2, 2019	831 (RV)	± 3.4%	49%	40%	11%	–

with Donald J. Trump and generic Democrat

Poll source	Date(s) administered	Sample size	Margin of error	Donald J. Trump (R)	Generic Democrat	Undecided
Public Policy Polling/End Citizens United (Note: End Citizens United PAC has exclusively endorsed Democratic candidates)	Dec 13–15, 2019	944 (V)	–	47%	49%	3%
Public Policy Polling	Apr 29–30, 2019	780 (V)	± 3.5%	48%	48%	–

=== Results ===
2020 United States presidential election in Iowa
Party	Candidate	Votes	%	±%
Republican	Donald Trump (incumbent) Mike Pence (incumbent)	897,672	53.09%	+1.94%
Democratic	Joe Biden Kamala Harris	759,061	44.89%	+3.15%
Libertarian	Jo Jorgensen Spike Cohen	19,637	1.16%	−2.62%
Independent	Kanye West Michelle Tidball	3,210	0.19%	N/A
Green	Howie Hawkins Angela Walker	3,075	0.18%	−0.55%
Constitution	Don Blankenship William Mohr	1,707	0.10%	−0.24%
Alliance	Rocky De La Fuente Darcy Richardson	1,082	0.06%	N/A
Genealogy Know Your Family History	Ricki Sue King Dayna Chandler	546	0.03%	N/A
Independent	Brock Pierce Karla Ballard	544	0.03%	N/A
Write-in		4,337	0.38%	−1.09%
Total votes		1,690,871	100.00%	

==== By county ====
County	Donald Trump Republican		Joe Biden Democratic		Various candidates Other parties		Margin		Total
County	#	%	#	%	#	%	#	%	Total
Adair	2,917	69.83%	1,198	28.68%	62	1.49%	1,719	41.15%	4,177
Adams	1,530	70.83%	590	27.31%	40	1.86%	940	43.52%	2,160
Allamakee	4,735	63.80%	2,576	34.71%	111	1.49%	2,159	29.09%	7,422
Appanoose	4,512	69.24%	1,891	29.02%	113	1.74%	2,621	40.22%	6,516
Audubon	2,295	67.11%	1,071	31.32%	54	1.57%	1,224	35.79%	3,420
Benton	9,188	62.75%	5,160	35.24%	294	2.01%	4,028	27.51%	14,642
Black Hawk	29,640	44.51%	35,647	53.53%	1,306	1.96%	-6,097	-9.02%	66,593
Boone	8,695	56.68%	6,303	41.09%	342	2.23%	2,392	15.59%	15,340
Bremer	8,294	57.02%	5,958	40.96%	294	2.02%	2,336	16.06%	14,546
Buchanan	6,420	59.59%	4,169	38.70%	185	1.71%	2,251	20.89%	10,774
Buena Vista	5,056	61.91%	2,961	36.26%	150	1.83%	2,095	25.65%	8,167
Butler	5,542	68.44%	2,424	29.93%	132	1.63%	3,118	38.51%	8,098
Calhoun	3,689	70.16%	1,470	27.96%	99	1.88%	2,219	42.20%	5,258
Carroll	7,737	68.26%	3,454	30.47%	144	1.27%	4,283	37.79%	11,335
Cass	4,969	68.29%	2,201	30.25%	106	1.46%	2,768	38.04%	7,276
Cedar	6,161	57.56%	4,337	40.52%	205	1.92%	1,824	17.04%	10,703
Cerro Gordo	12,442	52.28%	10,941	45.97%	418	1.75%	1,501	6.31%	23,801
Cherokee	4,495	68.96%	1,936	29.70%	87	1.34%	2,559	39.26%	6,518
Chickasaw	4,308	64.97%	2,233	33.68%	90	1.35%	2,075	31.29%	6,631
Clarke	3,144	67.32%	1,466	31.39%	60	1.29%	1,678	35.93%	4,670
Clay	6,137	68.42%	2,662	29.68%	170	1.90%	3,475	38.74%	8,969
Clayton	6,106	63.64%	3,340	34.81%	148	1.55%	2,766	28.83%	9,594
Clinton	13,361	54.12%	10,812	43.80%	514	2.08%	2,549	10.32%	24,687
Crawford	4,854	67.85%	2,220	31.03%	80	1.12%	2,634	36.82%	7,154
Dallas	27,987	49.96%	26,879	47.98%	1,156	2.06%	1,108	1.98%	56,022
Davis	3,032	73.92%	1,013	24.70%	57	1.38%	2,019	49.22%	4,102
Decatur	2,615	68.74%	1,120	29.44%	69	1.82%	1,495	39.30%	3,804
Delaware	6,666	66.64%	3,157	31.56%	180	1.80%	3,509	35.08%	10,003
Des Moines	10,592	53.08%	8,893	44.56%	471	2.36%	1,699	8.52%	19,956
Dickinson	7,438	66.15%	3,661	32.56%	145	1.29%	3,777	33.59%	11,244
Dubuque	27,214	50.47%	25,657	47.58%	1,055	1.95%	1,557	2.89%	53,926
Emmet	3,265	67.28%	1,520	31.32%	68	1.40%	1,745	35.96%	4,853
Fayette	6,145	60.33%	3,835	37.65%	206	2.02%	2,310	22.68%	10,186
Floyd	4,732	58.91%	3,172	39.49%	128	1.60%	1,560	19.42%	8,032
Franklin	3,422	66.71%	1,626	31.70%	82	1.59%	1,796	35.01%	5,130
Fremont	2,711	70.29%	1,080	28.00%	66	1.71%	1,631	42.29%	3,857
Greene	3,223	63.73%	1,769	34.98%	65	1.29%	1,454	28.75%	5,057
Grundy	4,929	67.74%	2,206	30.32%	141	1.94%	2,723	37.42%	7,276
Guthrie	4,272	67.05%	1,985	31.16%	114	1.79%	2,287	35.89%	6,371
Hamilton	4,956	62.39%	2,843	35.79%	144	1.82%	2,113	26.60%	7,943
Hancock	4,390	71.13%	1,683	27.27%	99	1.60%	2,707	43.86%	6,172
Hardin	5,850	65.08%	2,976	33.11%	163	1.81%	2,874	31.97%	8,989
Harrison	5,569	68.29%	2,440	29.92%	146	1.79%	3,129	38.37%	8,155
Henry	6,507	65.19%	3,275	32.81%	200	2.00%	3,232	32.38%	9,982
Howard	3,127	63.07%	1,772	35.74%	59	1.19%	1,355	27.33%	4,958
Humboldt	3,819	71.69%	1,442	27.07%	66	1.24%	2,377	44.62%	5,327
Ida	2,880	74.82%	917	23.82%	52	1.36%	1,963	51.00%	3,849
Iowa	6,009	61.68%	3,547	36.41%	186	1.91%	2,462	25.27%	9,742
Jackson	6,940	62.33%	4,029	36.18%	166	1.49%	2,911	26.15%	11,135
Jasper	12,084	59.87%	7,737	38.33%	363	1.80%	4,347	21.54%	20,184
Jefferson	4,443	49.59%	4,319	48.21%	197	2.20%	125	1.38%	8,959
Johnson	22,925	27.34%	59,177	70.57%	1,749	2.09%	-36,252	-43.23%	83,851
Jones	6,572	59.81%	4,213	38.34%	204	1.85%	2,359	21.47%	10,989
Keokuk	3,797	71.60%	1,414	26.66%	92	1.74%	2,383	44.94%	5,303
Kossuth	6,275	69.03%	2,696	29.66%	119	1.31%	3,579	39.37%	9,090
Lee	9,773	58.40%	6,541	39.09%	420	2.51%	3,232	19.31%	16,734
Linn	53,364	41.87%	70,874	55.61%	3,220	2.52%	-17,510	-13.74%	127,458
Louisa	3,500	65.64%	1,726	32.37%	106	1.99%	1,774	33.27%	5,332
Lucas	3,287	70.99%	1,284	27.73%	59	1.28%	2,003	43.26%	4,630
Lyon	5,707	83.16%	1,067	15.55%	89	1.29%	4,640	67.61%	6,863
Madison	6,507	66.24%	3,134	31.90%	183	1.86%	3,373	34.34%	9,824
Mahaska	8,297	72.76%	2,894	25.38%	213	1.86%	5,403	47.38%	11,404
Marion	12,663	65.84%	6,178	32.12%	391	2.04%	6,485	33.72%	19,232
Marshall	9,571	52.77%	8,176	45.08%	389	2.15%	1,395	7.69%	18,136
Mills	5,585	67.55%	2,508	30.33%	175	2.12%	3,077	37.22%	8,268
Mitchell	3,677	63.16%	2,053	35.26%	92	1.58%	1,624	27.90%	5,822
Monona	3,248	68.70%	1,407	29.76%	73	1.54%	1,841	38.94%	4,728
Monroe	2,975	72.77%	1,078	26.37%	35	0.86%	1,897	46.40%	4,088
Montgomery	3,659	68.69%	1,583	29.72%	85	1.59%	2,076	38.97%	5,327
Muscatine	10,823	52.36%	9,372	45.34%	476	2.30%	1,451	7.02%	20,671
O'Brien	5,861	77.62%	1,569	20.78%	121	1.60%	4,292	56.84%	7,551
Osceola	2,690	80.83%	601	18.06%	37	1.11%	2,089	62.77%	3,328
Page	5,319	70.66%	2,086	27.71%	123	1.63%	3,233	42.95%	7,528
Palo Alto	3,370	67.97%	1,519	30.64%	69	1.39%	1,851	37.33%	4,958
Plymouth	10,492	73.95%	3,494	24.63%	202	1.42%	6,998	49.32%	14,188
Pocahontas	2,826	73.92%	933	24.40%	64	1.68%	1,893	49.52%	3,823
Polk	106,800	41.27%	146,250	56.52%	5,705	2.21%	-39,450	-15.25%	258,755
Pottawattamie	26,247	57.38%	18,575	40.61%	922	2.01%	7,672	16.77%	45,744
Poweshiek	5,657	55.79%	4,306	42.47%	177	1.74%	1,351	13.32%	10,140
Ringgold	1,968	72.51%	709	26.12%	37	1.37%	1,259	46.39%	2,714
Sac	4,061	73.37%	1,389	25.09%	85	1.54%	2,672	48.28%	5,535
Scott	43,683	47.17%	46,926	50.68%	1,990	2.15%	-3,243	-3.51%	92,599
Shelby	4,697	69.12%	1,959	28.83%	139	2.05%	2,738	40.29%	6,795
Sioux	15,680	82.31%	3,019	15.85%	352	1.84%	12,661	66.46%	19,051
Story	20,340	39.85%	29,175	57.16%	1,523	2.99%	-8,835	-17.31%	51,038
Tama	5,303	58.61%	3,577	39.53%	168	1.86%	1,726	19.08%	9,048
Taylor	2,463	75.81%	746	22.96%	40	1.23%	1,717	52.85%	3,249
Union	4,010	64.83%	2,061	33.32%	114	1.85%	1,949	31.51%	6,185
Van Buren	2,859	75.42%	875	23.08%	57	1.50%	1,984	52.34%	3,791
Wapello	9,516	60.87%	5,821	37.24%	296	1.89%	3,695	23.63%	15,633
Warren	17,782	57.29%	12,574	40.51%	683	2.20%	5,208	16.78%	31,039
Washington	6,971	59.25%	4,561	38.77%	233	1.98%	2,410	20.48%	11,765
Wayne	2,338	75.20%	727	23.38%	44	1.42%	1,611	51.82%	3,109
Webster	10,938	61.37%	6,613	37.11%	271	1.52%	4,325	24.26%	17,822
Winnebago	3,707	62.09%	2,135	35.76%	128	2.15%	1,572	26.33%	5,970
Winneshiek	6,235	51.68%	5,617	46.56%	212	1.76%	618	5.12%	12,064
Woodbury	25,736	56.73%	18,704	41.23%	922	2.04%	7,032	16.40%	45,362
Worth	2,738	61.97%	1,596	36.12%	84	1.91%	1,142	25.85%	4,418
Wright	4,136	66.13%	1,996	31.92%	122	1.95%	2,140	34.21%	6,254
Totals	897,672	53.09%	759,061	44.89%	34,138	2.02%	138,611	8.20%	1,690,871

==== By congressional district ====
Trump won all four of the state's congressional districts, including one that elected a Democrat.

District	Trump	Biden	Representative
1st	51%	47%	Abby Finkenauer
1st	51%	47%	Ashley Hinson
2nd	51%	47%	Dave Loebsack
2nd	51%	47%	Mariannette Miller-Meeks
3rd	49.0%	48.9%	Cindy Axne
4th	62%	36%	Steve King
4th	62%	36%	Randy Feenstra

== Analysis ==
Per exit polling by the Associated Press, Trump's strength in Iowa came from White Iowans with no college degree, who comprised 62% of the electorate and supported Trump by 58%–40%. Trump also dominated amongst Christian voters, garnering 66% of Protestants, 54% of Catholics, and 76% of born-again/Evangelical Christians. 53% of voters believed Trump was better able to handle international trade. Trump continued to win the cultural message among voters without college degrees in Iowa.

During the primary season, there remained hope among Democrats that Iowa would still be a contestable state. However, Trump's well-held victory in the state in the general election also saw Republican congressional candidates—from Senator Joni Ernst to two House seats, both held by Democrats (one vacated by Dave Loebsack in Iowa's 2nd district)—winning their election.

Neither Biden nor Trump flipped any counties in the state, although Biden came within 2% of flipping Dallas County, a suburb of Des Moines. Jefferson County was also very close, having gone for Trump by a similarly tight margin four years earlier.

=== Edison exit polls ===
2020 presidential election in Iowa by demographic subgroup (Edison exit polling)
Demographic subgroup	Biden	Trump	% of total vote
Total vote	44.89	53.09	100
Ideology
Liberals	90	9	20
Moderates	59	38	41
Conservatives	8	90	39
Party
Democrats	93	7	26
Republicans	7	93	36
Independents	50	46	38
Gender
Men	39	58	48
Women	51	48	52
Race/ethnicity
White	43	55	92
Black	76	22	2
Latino	67	31	4
Asian	–	–	1
Other	–	–	2
Age
18–24 years old	58	39	10
25–29 years old	39	55	5
30–39 years old	44	50	13
40–49 years old	50	48	14
50–64 years old	40	60	28
65 and older	45	54	28
Sexual orientation
LGBT	–	–	4
Not LGBT	44	55	96
Education
High school or less	37	63	19
Some college education	46	53	26
Associate degree	39	59	17
Bachelor's degree	49	48	26
Postgraduate degree	58	39	13
Income
Under $30,000	58	41	15
$30,000–49,999	47	49	23
$50,000–99,999	39	60	35
$100,000–199,999	46	51	22
Over $200,000	–	–	5
Issue regarded as most important
Racial inequality	91	8	10
Coronavirus	88	10	19
Economy	10	87	36
Crime and safety	13	86	12
Health care	79	19	13
Region
Eastern Cities	54	44	27
East Central	42	56	19
Des Moines Area	54	44	24
Central	35	64	16
West	31	67	15
Area type
Urban	56	42	32
Suburban	48	51	29
Rural	35	63	39
Family's financial situation today
Better than four years ago	16	82	46
Worse than four years ago	87	10	13
About the same	60	38	41

== See also ==
- United States presidential elections in Iowa
- 2020 Iowa elections
- 2020 United States presidential election
- 2020 Democratic Party presidential primaries
- 2020 Republican Party presidential primaries
- 2020 United States elections

== Notes ==
Partisan clients
