= Ruth Harkin =

American attorney (born 1944)

Deputy Counsel for the United States Department of Agriculture
- In office 1979–1981
- President: Jimmy Carter

Story County Attorney
- In office 1973–1979

Personal details
- Born: Ruth Raduenz; August 27, 1944 (age 82) Vesta, Minnesota, U.S.
- Spouse: Tom Harkin (m. 1968)
- Children: 2
- Education: University of Minnesota (BA); Catholic University of America (JD)

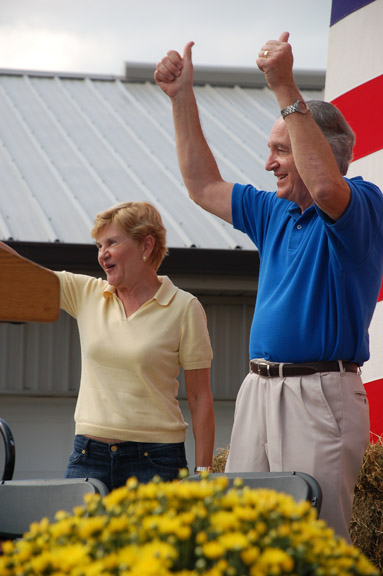
Ruth and Tom Harkin

Ruth Harkin (née Raduenz; born 1944) is an American attorney who served as county attorney of Story County, Iowa, one of the first female prosecutors elected in the United States.

== Early life and education ==
Harkin was born in Vesta, Minnesota on August 27, 1944. She earned a Bachelor of Arts degree in English from the University of Minnesota and a Juris Doctor from the Columbus School of Law.

== Career ==
Harkin was elected county attorney of Story County, Iowa in 1973 and served until 1979. From 1979 to 1981, she served as a deputy counsel for the United States Department of Agriculture prior to joining the Washington lobbying firm of Akin Gump Strauss Hauer & Feld, LLP in 1983. In 1993, President Bill Clinton named her chair and chief executive officer of the Overseas Private Investment Corporation (OPIC). Harkin left the government and became Senior Vice President for international affairs and government relations of United Technologies in April 1997. In 2002, she became a Director of ConocoPhillips. Harkin was a member of the Iowa Board of Regents from 2005 to 2015.

Harkin endorsed Hillary Clinton in the 2008 Democratic Party presidential primaries.

== Personal life ==
Harkin has been married to United States Senator Tom Harkin (Retired) since 1968. The couple has two daughters.
