= 2008 United States Senate election in Iowa =

- November 4, 2008
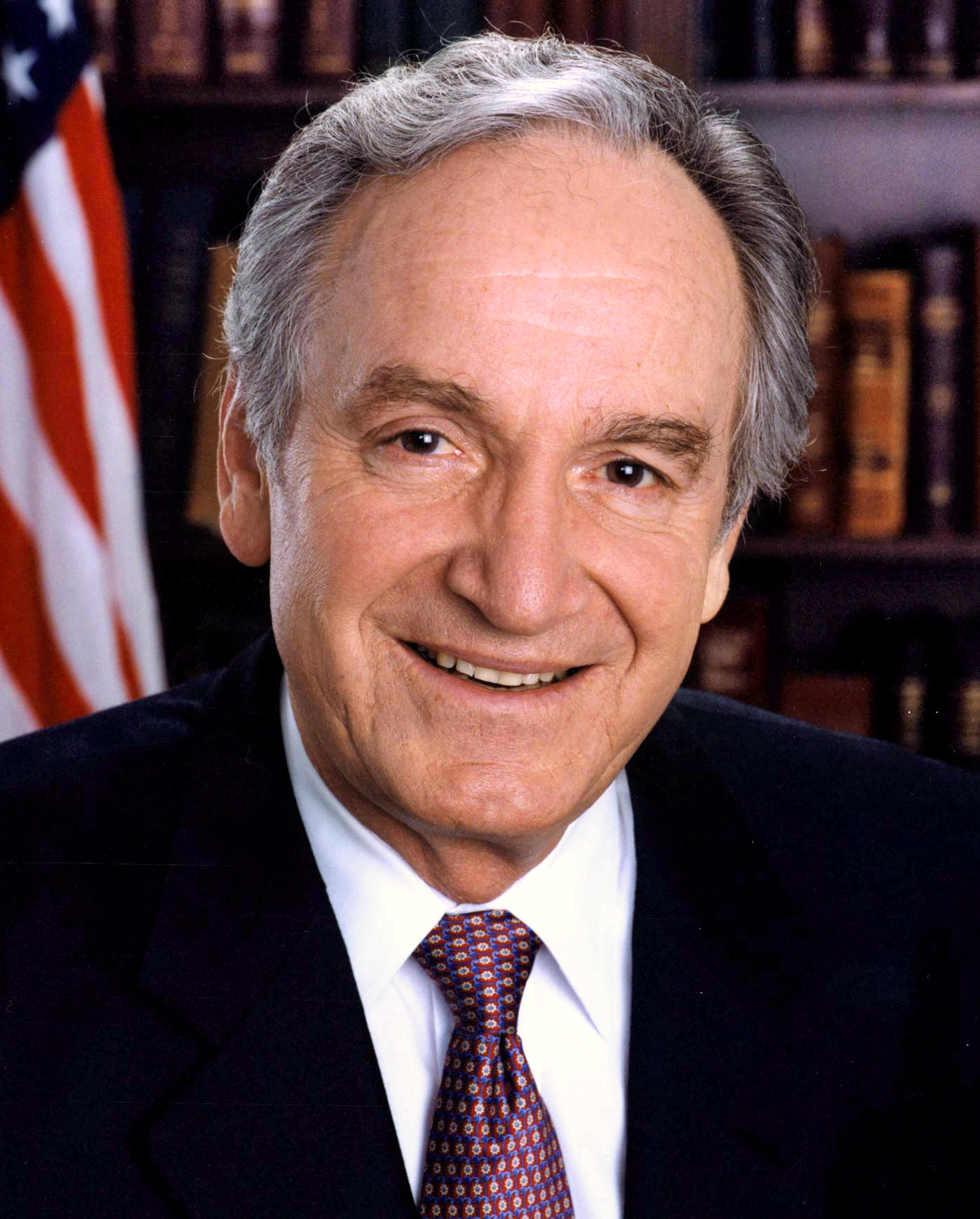

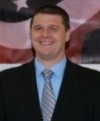
| Nominee | Tom Harkin | Christopher Reed |
| Party | Democratic | Republican |
| Popular vote | 941,665 | 560,006 |
| Percentage | 62.66% | 37.26% |
- Harkin: 50–60% 60–70% 70–80% 80–90% >90% Reed: 50–60% 60–70% 70–80% 80–90% Tie: 50% No data
U.S. senator before election
Tom Harkin
Democratic
Elected U.S. Senator
Tom Harkin
Democratic

The 2008 United States Senate election in Iowa was held on November 4, 2008. Incumbent Senator Tom Harkin sought re-election to a fifth and final term in office. Unlike Harkin's three previous reelection bids, he was not challenged by a sitting United States congressman, but instead faced small businessman Christopher Reed, who won the Republican primary by just a few hundred votes. Harkin defeated Reed in a landslide, winning 94 of Iowa's 99 counties. This was the last time a Democrat won a U.S. Senate election in Iowa until 2026.

== Democratic primary ==
=== Candidates ===
- Tom Harkin, incumbent U.S. senator

=== Results ===
Democratic primary results
| Party | Candidate | Votes | % |
|---|---|---|---|
| Democratic | Tom Harkin (incumbent) | 90,785 | 98.83% |
| Democratic | Write-ins | 1,074 | 1.17% |
| Total votes | | 91,859 | 100.00% |

== Republican primary ==
=== Candidates ===
- George Eichhorn, former Iowa state representative
- Steve Rathje, construction company executive
- Christopher Reed, small businessman

=== Results ===
Republican primary results by county Reed: 30–40%; 40–50%; 50–60%; Eichhorn: 30–40%; 40–50%; 50–60%; 70–80%; Rathje: 30–40%; 40–50%; 50–60%

Republican primary results
| Party | Candidate | Votes | % |
|---|---|---|---|
| Republican | Christopher Reed | 24,964 | 35.32% |
| Republican | George Eichhorn | 24,390 | 34.52% |
| Republican | Steve Rathje | 21,062 | 29.80% |
| Republican | Write-ins | 256 | 0.36% |
| Total votes | | 70,672 | 100.00% |

== General election ==
=== Predictions ===
| Source | Ranking | As of |
|---|---|---|
| The Cook Political Report | Safe D | October 23, 2008 |
| CQ Politics | Safe D | October 31, 2008 |
| Rothenberg Political Report | Safe D | November 2, 2008 |
| Real Clear Politics | Safe D | November 4, 2008 |

=== Polling ===
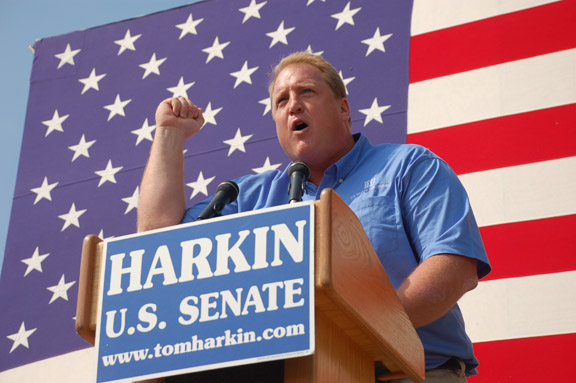
Governor Chet Culver campaigning for Senator Harkin

| Poll source | Dates administered | Christopher Reed (R) | Tom Harkin (D) |
|---|---|---|---|
| Survey USA | April 21–23, 2008 | 20% | 59% |
| Research 2000 | June 10, 2008 | 37% | 53% |
| Rasmussen Reports | July 10, 2008 | 37% | 55% |
| Rasmussen Reports | August 7, 2008 | 36% | 60% |
| Rasmussen Reports | September 17–18, 2008 | 37% | 60% |
| Survey USA | October 23, 2008 | 41% | 57% |
| Rasmussen Reports | October 29, 2008 | 35% | 61% |

=== Results ===
United States Senate election in Iowa, 2008
| Party | Candidate | Votes | % | ±% |
|---|---|---|---|---|
| Democratic | Tom Harkin (incumbent) | 941,665 | 62.66% | +8.48% |
| Republican | Christopher Reed | 560,006 | 37.26% | −6.52% |
| Write-in | | 1,247 | 0.08% | N/A |
| Majority | | 381,659 | 25.39% | +15.00% |
| Turnout | | 1,502,918 | | |
| Democratic hold | | Swing | | |

==== Counties that flipped from Republican to Democratic ====
- Butler (largest city: Parkersburg)
- Crawford (largest city: Denison)
- Delaware (largest city: Manchester)
- Van Buren (largest city: Keosauqua)
- Plymouth (largest city: Le Mars)
- Grundy (largest city: Grundy Center)
- Harrison (largest city: Missouri Valley)
- Cass (largest city: Atlantic)
- Ida (largest city: Ida Grove)
- Fremont (largest city: Sidney)
- Pottawattamie (largest city: Council Bluffs)
- Sac (largest city: Sac City)
- Shelby (largest city: Harlan)
- Marion (largest city: Pella)
- Mills (largest city: Glenwood)
- Montgomery (largest city: Red Oak)
- Mahaska (largest city: Oskaloosa)

=== By congressional district ===
Harkin won all five congressional districts, including two that elected Republicans.

| District | Harkin | Reed | Representative |
|---|---|---|---|
| 1st | 67% | 33% | Bruce Braley |
| 2nd | 68% | 32% | Dave Loebsack |
| 3rd | 60% | 40% | Leonard Boswell |
| 4th | 62% | 38% | Tom Latham |
| 5th | 55% | 45% | Steve King |

== See also ==
- 2008 United States Senate elections
