= 1990 United States Senate election in Iowa =

- November 6, 1990
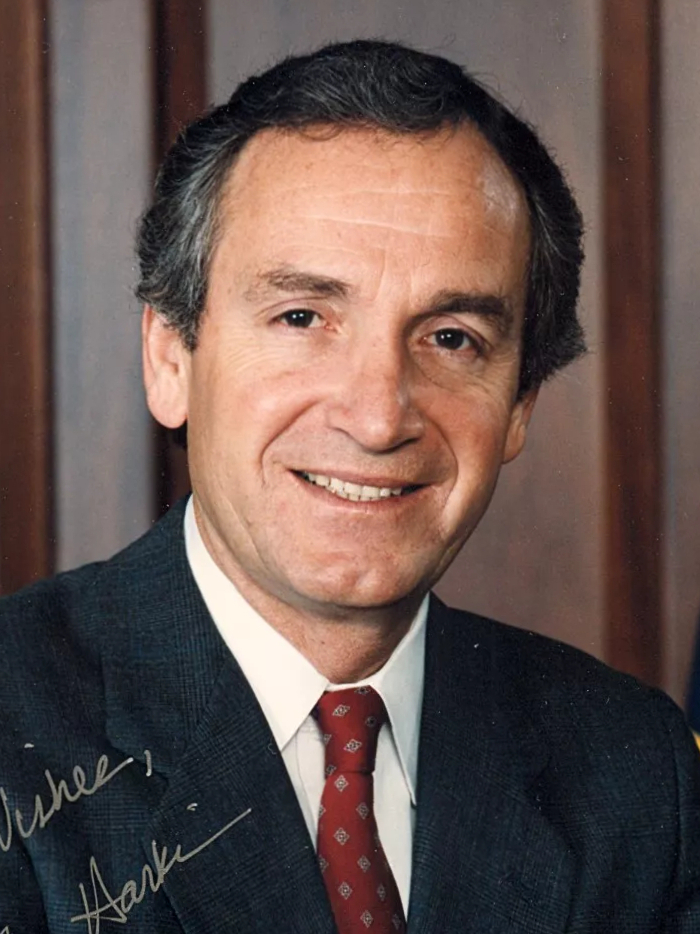

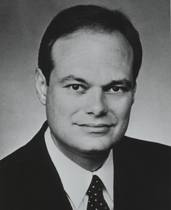
Nominee	Tom Harkin	Tom Tauke
Party	Democratic	Republican
Popular vote	535,975	446,869
Percentage	54.47%	45.42%
- County results Harkin: 50–60% 60–70% Tauke: 50–60% 60–70% 70–80%
U.S. senator before election
Tom Harkin
Democratic
Elected U.S. Senator
Tom Harkin
Democratic

The 1990 United States Senate election in Iowa was held on November 6, 1990. Incumbent Democratic U.S. Senator Tom Harkin sought re-election to a second term in office. Harkin was opposed by Republican U.S. Congressman Tom Tauke, from Iowa's 2nd congressional district, and both Harkin and Tauke won their primaries uncontested. Though Harkin performed slightly worse than he had six years earlier, he was successful in his re-election bid and defeated Tauke. He was the only Democrat re-elected to the Senate from the state since 1938.

== Democratic primary ==
=== Candidates ===
- Tom Harkin, incumbent United States Senator

=== Results ===
Democratic primary results
Party	Candidate	Votes	%
Democratic	Tom Harkin (incumbent)	162,661	99.47
Democratic	Write-ins	867	0.53
Total votes		163,528	100.00

== Republican primary ==
=== Candidates ===
- Tom Tauke, U.S. Representative from Dubuque

=== Results ===
Republican primary results
Party	Candidate	Votes	%
Republican	Tom Tauke	91,798	99.81%
Republican	Write-ins	172	0.19%
Total votes		91,970	100.00%

== General election ==
=== Results ===
United States Senate election in Iowa, 1990
Party	Candidate	Votes	%	±%
Democratic	Tom Harkin (incumbent)	535,975	54.47%	−0.98%
Republican	Tom Tauke	446,869	45.42%	+1.76%
Write-in		1,089	0.11%	
Majority		89,106	9.06%	−2.74%
Turnout		983,933		
Democratic hold		Swing		

== See also ==
- 1990 United States Senate elections
