= Tom Harkin =

American lawyer and retired politician (born 1939)

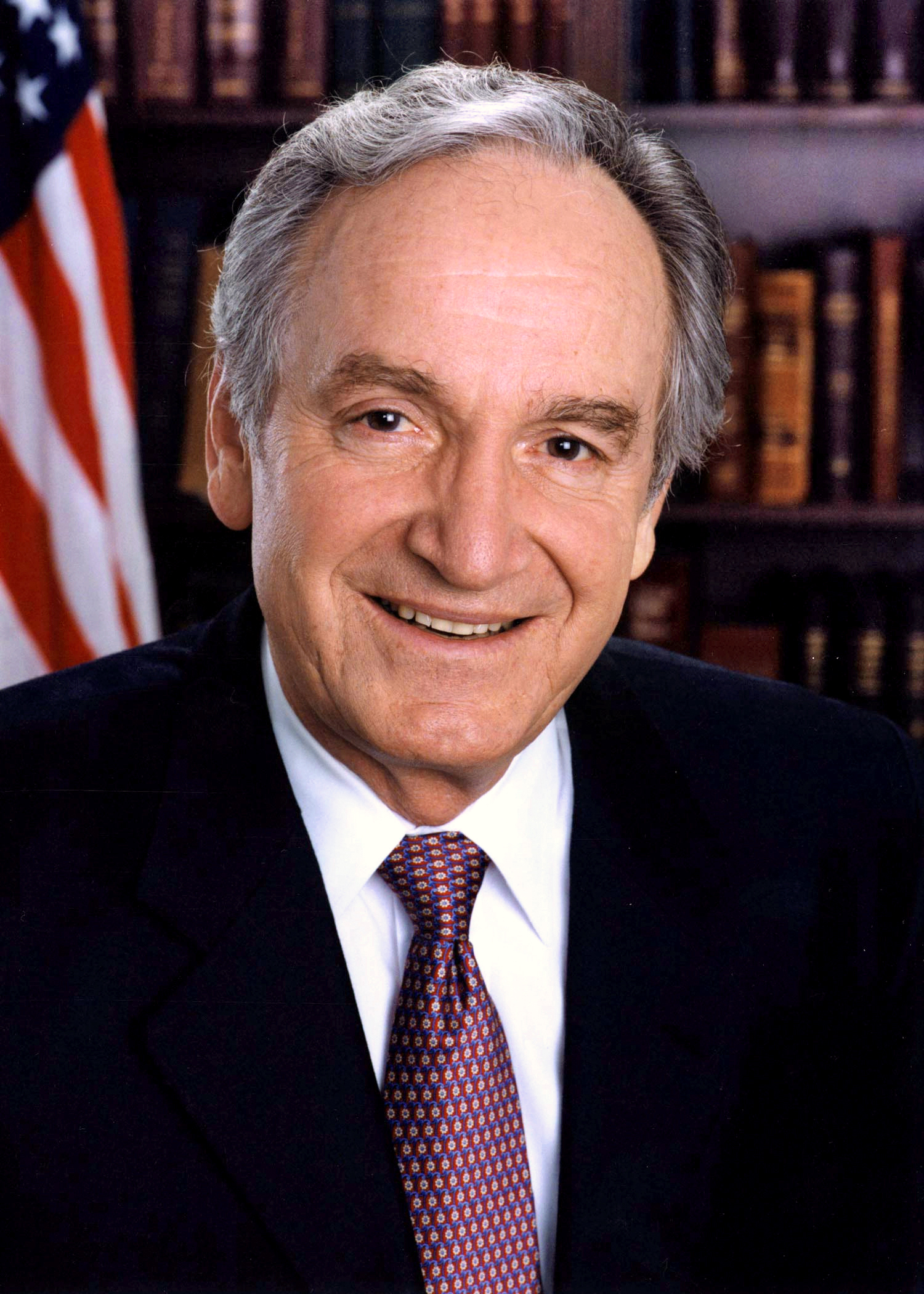
- Official portrait, c. 2002

United States Senator from Iowa
- In office January 3, 1985 – January 3, 2015
- Preceded by: Roger Jepsen
- Succeeded by: Joni Ernst
Senate positions
Chair of the Senate Health, Education, Labor and Pensions Committee
In office September 9, 2009 – January 3, 2015
Preceded by	Chris Dodd (acting)
Succeeded by	Lamar Alexander
Chair of the Senate Agriculture Committee
In office January 3, 2007 – September 9, 2009
Preceded by	Saxby Chambliss
Succeeded by	Blanche Lincoln
In office June 6, 2001 – January 3, 2003
Preceded by	Richard Lugar
Succeeded by	Thad Cochran
In office January 3, 2001 – January 20, 2001
Preceded by	Richard Lugar
Succeeded by	Richard Lugar

Member of the U.S. House of Representatives from Iowa's 5th district
- In office January 3, 1975 – January 3, 1985
- Preceded by: William J. Scherle
- Succeeded by: Jim Ross Lightfoot

Personal details
- Born: Thomas Richard Harkin; November 19, 1939 (age 86) Cumming, Iowa, U.S.
- Party: Democratic
- Spouse: Ruth Raduenz (m. 1968)
- Children: 2
- Education: Iowa State University (BA); Catholic University (JD)

Military service
- Branch/service: United States Navy; United States Naval Reserve
- Years of service: 1962–1967 (active); 1967–1989 (reserve)
- Rank: Commander
- Unit: Naval Air Facility Atsugi; Guantanamo Bay Naval Base
- Harkin's voice Harkin on the lack of scheduling for stem cell research legislation. Recorded May 8, 2006

Thomas Richard Harkin (born November 19, 1939) is an American lawyer, author, and politician who served as a United States senator from Iowa from 1985 to 2015. A member of the Democratic Party, he previously was the U.S. representative for Iowa's 5th congressional district from 1975 to 1985. He is the longest-serving United States Senator to spend their entire tenure as a state's junior senator.

Born in Cumming, Iowa, Harkin graduated from Iowa State University and The Catholic University of America's Columbus School of Law. He served in the United States Navy as an active-duty jet pilot (1962–1967). After serving as a congressional aide for several years, he made two runs for the U.S. House of Representatives, losing in 1972 but winning in 1974. He went on to serve five terms in the House.

Harkin won a race for U.S. Senate in 1984 by a wide margin. He was an early frontrunner for his party's presidential nomination in 1992, but he dropped out in support of eventual winner Bill Clinton. He served five Senate terms and at the end of his time in the Senate served as chair of the Senate Committee on Health, Education, Labor, and Pensions. He authored the Americans with Disabilities Act of 1990 and was its chief sponsor in the Senate. Harkin delivered part of his introduction speech in sign language, saying it was so his deaf brother could understand.

On January 26, 2013, Harkin announced that he would not seek reelection in 2014.

== Early life, education, and early political career ==
Harkin was born in Cumming, Iowa. His father, Patrick Francis Harkin, an Irish American, was a coal miner, and his mother, Franciska Frances Valentine (née Berčič), was a Slovene immigrant who died when he was ten. Harkin has three half-siblings on his mother's side from her first marriage in Iowa to fellow Slovenian Valentine Brelih. Frances was born in Suha, Slovenia to Jakob and Marija (born Jugovec). He still maintains his childhood house, where he and his five siblings were raised without hot running water or a furnace. He attended Dowling Catholic High School which is located in West Des Moines, Iowa.

Harkin attended Iowa State University on a Navy ROTC scholarship and became a member of Delta Sigma Phi fraternity. He graduated with a degree in government and economics in 1962, and served in the United States Navy as an active-duty jet pilot from 1962 to 1967. Harkin was stationed at Naval Air Facility Atsugi in Japan, where he ferried aircraft to and from the airbase that had been damaged in the Vietnam War and in operational and training accidents. He was also stationed for a time at Guantanamo Bay, where he flew missions in support of U-2 planes reconnoitering Cuba. After leaving active duty in 1967, he spent three years in the Ready Reserves, and transitioned into the Naval Reserves in 1970. He retired in 1989 with the rank of commander.

In 1969, Harkin moved to Washington, D.C., and began work as an aide to Democratic U.S. Congressman Neal Smith. During his work for Smith, he accompanied a congressional delegation that went to South Vietnam in 1970. Harkin published photographs he took during the trip and a detailed account of the "Tiger cages" at Côn Đảo Prison in Life Magazine on July 17, 1970. The account exposed shocking, inhumane conditions and treatment to which prisoners were subjected. He received his Juris Doctor (J.D.) degree from The Catholic University of America's Columbus School of Law in 1972.

== U.S. House of Representatives ==
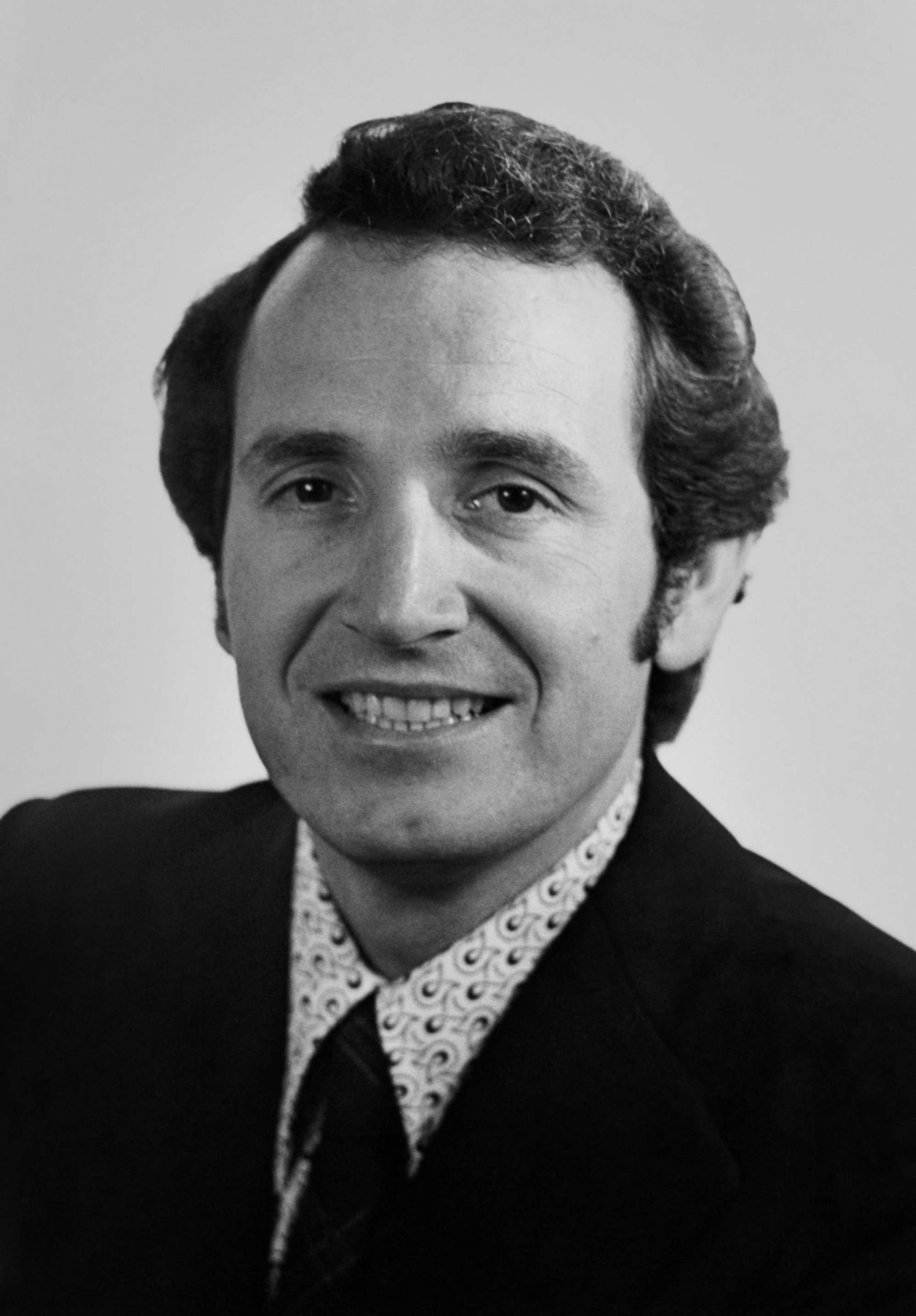
Harkin during his time in the House of Representatives

In 1972, the same year that he graduated from law school, Harkin returned to Iowa and immediately ran against an incumbent Republican Congressman, William J. Scherle. Scherle represented the southwestern portion of Iowa, which (with one brief exception) had not elected a Democrat to Congress since the end of the Great Depression. While winning a higher percentage of votes than any of Scherle's previous opponents, Harkin nevertheless lost the race. After his 1972 defeat, Harkin practiced law in Ames before seeking a rematch against Scherle in 1974. In what was generally a bad year for Republicans due to the Watergate scandal, Harkin defeated Scherle by only 3,500 votes. He was re-elected four more times from Iowa's 5th congressional district without serious difficulty.

== United States Senator ==
=== Elections ===
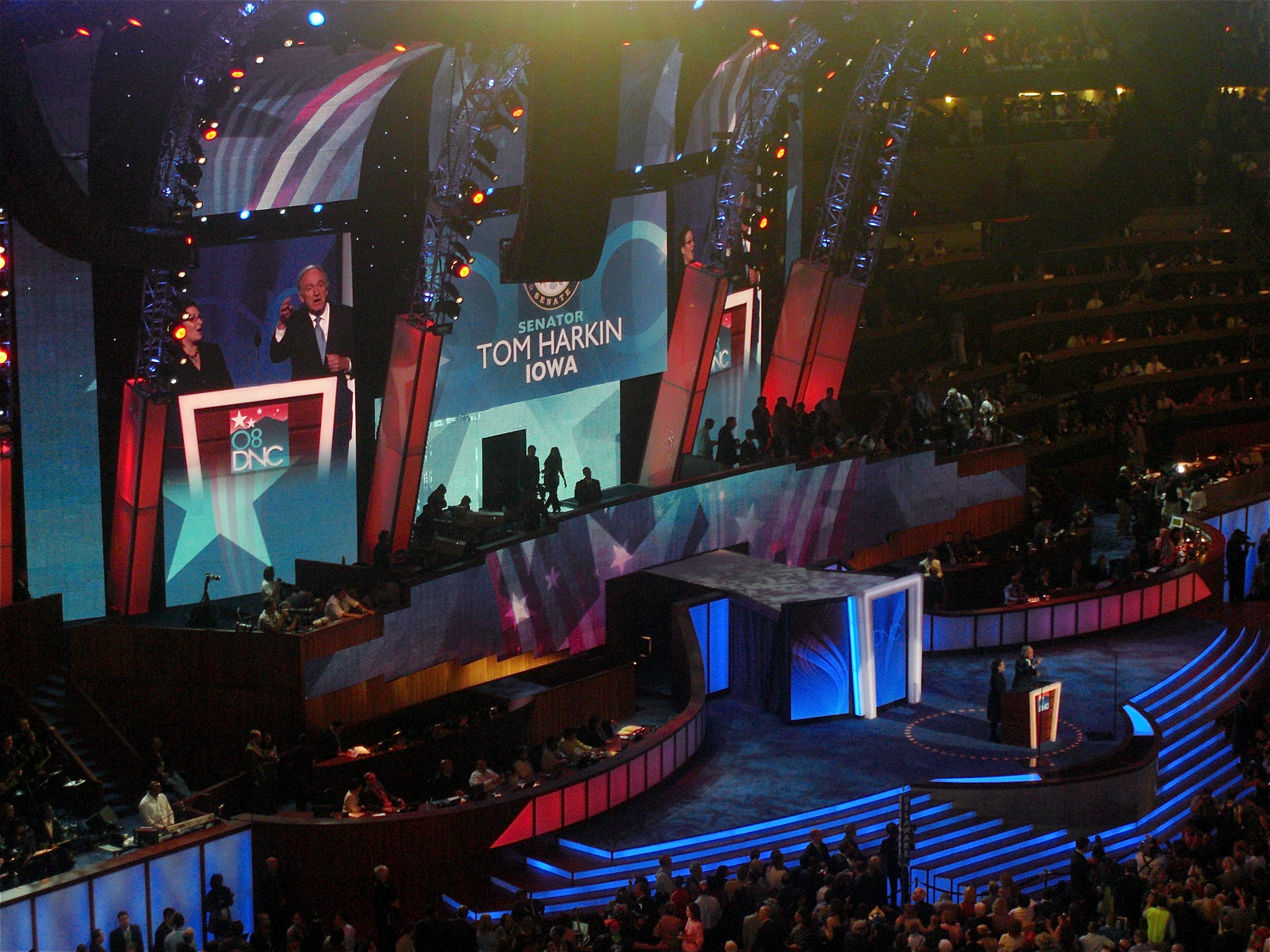
Harkin speaks during the first night of the 2008 Democratic National Convention in Denver, Colorado, opening his speech using American Sign Language in reference to his involvement with the Americans with Disabilities Act.

In 1984, Harkin won the Democratic nomination for the United States Senate and defeated freshman Republican Roger Jepsen by 152,502 votes. He was re-elected in 1990, 1996, 2002, and 2008.

=== Tenure ===
Harkin served in the United States Senate longer than any Democrat in Iowa's history. In 2009, he passed Neal Edward Smith as the longest-serving Democrat in either chamber from Iowa. Notably, he spent his entire tenure as Iowa's junior Senator, due to his colleague Chuck Grassley having served in the chamber since 1981. He and Grassley had a fairly good relationship, despite their often sharp ideological differences, and their seniority made Iowa influential in national politics. Indeed, during his tribute to Harkin shortly before his departure, Grassley got notably choked up as Harkin entered the chamber.

Harkin and Barbara Boxer were the only Senate Democrats to support Wisconsin Senator Russ Feingold's 2006 resolution to censure President George W. Bush.

Harkin (in addition to U.S. Senators Dick Lugar, Tim Johnson, Byron Dorgan, Joe Biden and Norm Coleman), introduced the BioFuels Security Act (S. 2817/109th) on March 16, 2006.

Harkin came out in favor of the Fairness Doctrine during an interview with Bill Press. (February 11, 2009)

Harkin has been influential in increasing research funding for alternative medicine. He was instrumental in the creation of the U.S. Office of Alternative Medicine in 1992, which later became the National Center for Complementary and Alternative Medicine. His efforts and the center's results, however, have been criticized.

On July 16, 2013, Harkin introduced the Cooperative and Small Employer Charity Pension Flexibility Act (S. 1302; 113th Congress) into the Senate. The bill would make changes to the Employee Retirement Income Security Act of 1974 (ERISA) and the Internal Revenue Code of 1986 to alter the funding requirements of certain private pension plans that are maintained by more than one employer where the employers are either cooperatives or charities. The bill would make permanent an existing exemption from the Pension Protection Act of 2006 for a few small groups.

On November 19, 2013, Harkin introduced the Minimum Wage Fairness Act (S. 1737; 113th Congress). The bill would amend the Fair Labor Standards Act of 1938 (FLSA) to increase the federal minimum wage for employees to $10.10 per hour over the course of a two-year period. The bill was strongly supported by President Barack Obama and many of the Democratic Senators, but strongly opposed by Republicans in the Senate and House.

==== Social policy ====
Harkin introduces the Americans with Disabilities Act onto the Senate floor, using sign language for his deaf brother.

Harkin introduced the Americans with Disabilities Act (ADA) into the Senate. Harkin delivered part of a speech in sign language so his deaf brother could understand.

Harkin has taken issue with the Supreme Court's handling of a number of cases related to ADA, concerned that the judgments severely limited the scope of the legislation's effectiveness:

"Together, these cases, as handled by the nation's highest court, have created a supreme absurdity: The more successful a person is at coping with a disability, the more likely it is for a court to find that he or she is no longer sufficiently disabled to be protected by the ADA. If that is the ruling, then these individuals may find that their requests for reasonable accommodations at work can be denied. Or that they can be fired—without recourse."

In order to address these issues Harkin proposed the ADA Amendments Act, which in his words "will restore the proper balance and application of the ADA by clarifying and broadening the definition of disability, while increasing eligibility for ADA protections."

Harkin has also been a vocal critic of what he describes as the biased nature of the Medicaid program: "The current Medicaid system is unacceptably biased in favor of institutional care. Two-thirds of Medicaid long-term care dollars are spent on institutional services, with only one-third going to community-based care. It's time to rebalance the system."

During his political career, Harkin has generally supported the Supreme Court ruling Roe v. Wade, which decided that a right to privacy under the due process clause in the Fourteenth Amendment to the United States Constitution extends to a woman's decision to have an abortion. He has opposed most efforts to place legal restrictions on Roe v. Wade, including voting against a ban on late-term abortion, while supporting contraception and education to reduce teen pregnancy. As of 2003, Harkin received a 100 percent rating from NARAL, the pro-choice advocacy organization. He was very critical of the Stupak-Pitts Amendment, which places limits on taxpayer-funded abortions in the context of the November 2009 Affordable Health Care for America Act.

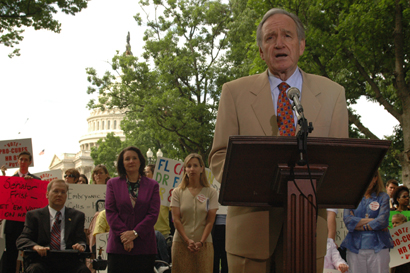
Sen. Tom Harkin speaks at a rally held by the Coalition for the Advancement of Stem Cell Research.

Harkin has come out in favor of embryonic stem cell research. In July 2006, Harkin made a speech from the Senate floor in response to George W. Bush's veto of the embryonic stem cell research federal funding bill.

In May 2009, Harkin announced he opposed any effort to overturn an Iowa Supreme Court decision in April 2009 that legalized same-sex marriage in Iowa. "We all grow as we get older; we learn things, we become more sensitive to people and people's lives," said Harkin. "The more I've looked at that, I've grown to think differently about how we should live. I guess I've got to the point of live and let live."

On December 18, 2010, Harkin voted in favor of the Don't Ask, Don't Tell Repeal Act of 2010.

In September 2014, Harkin was one of 69 members of the US House and Senate to sign a letter to then-FDA commissioner Sylvia Burwell requesting that the FDA revise its policy banning donation of corneas and other tissues by men who have had sex with another man in the preceding 5 years.

Harkin has also been active in combating the worst forms of child labor. The Trade Development Act of 2000 "contains important child labor protections authored by Senator Harkin." After reports of child trafficking and child slavery associated with cocoa plantations in West Africa surfaced in the media, Harkin, along with U.S. Representative Eliot Engel and with the support of U.S. Senator Herbert Kohl, sponsored a voluntary agreement by major players in the cocoa and chocolate industry signed in 2001 and often referred to as the Harkin–Engel Protocol. The purpose of this "Protocol for the growing and processing of cocoa beans and their derivative products" was to bring practices in West Africa into line with Convention 182 of the International Labour Organization concerning the prohibition and immediate action for the elimination of the worst forms of child labor. (Some difficulties in meeting the deadlines set in this Protocol have been encountered.) Harkin has worked in other ways to combat the import of child labor-made products.

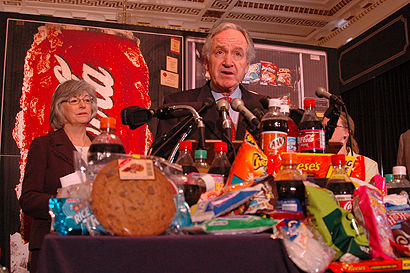
Sen. Tom Harkin holds a press conference regarding legislation to improve healthy eating habits.

Harkin believes America faces a retirement crisis, saying "Pensions have gone by the wayside. Savings are down as people are just scraping by, so the only thing left is Social Security."

Harkin supported President Barack Obama's health reform legislation; he voted for the Affordable Care Act (Obamacare) in December 2009, and he voted for the Health Care and Education Reconciliation Act of 2010. PolitiFact rated Harkin's 2009 claim, that 14,000 people lose health insurance every day, as “false."

However, in 2014 Harkin expressed some second thoughts. He criticized health reform as being too complex and convoluted. "All the prevention stuff is good but it's just really complicated. It doesn't have to be that complicated," he said of the Affordable Care Act. He also believes the new legislation rewards the insurance industry. He said important reforms such as preventing insurance companies from discriminating against people with pre-existing conditions and keeping young adults on their parents' health insurance plans until age 26 were laudable, but he believed that Democrats should not have settled for a solution he believed was inferior to government-provided health insurance. In retrospect, he believes the Democratic-controlled Senate and House should have enacted a single-payer healthcare system or a public option to give the uninsured access to government-run health plans that compete with private insurance companies. He repeated his comments in a 2024 interview, saying "President Obama wouldn't fight for [a single-payer system]. I still think we could have gotten it".

In 2014, Harkin said that healthcare in Cuba produces lower child mortality rates and higher life expectancy than the United States; PolitiFact rated this comment "half true", expressing skepticism about the reliability of Cuban government statistics.

==== Israel ====
Harkin has been a staunch supporter of Israel as a member of the Senate Appropriations Subcommittee on Foreign Operations, which appropriates about $2 billion annually for military financing for Israel. As of 2010 he was the third-largest career recipient of pro-Israel Political Action Committee contributions in the Senate.

==== Immigration ====
In May 2006 Harkin voted in favor of Senate Bill 2611, also known as the Comprehensive Immigration Reform Act. Among the bill's many provisions, it would increase the number of H1B visas, increase security along the southern United States border with Mexico, allow long-time illegal immigrants to gain citizenship with some restrictions, and increase the number of guest workers over and above those already present in the U.S. through a new "blue card" visa program. The bill ultimately failed to pass.

=== Committee assignments ===
- Committee on Agriculture, Nutrition, and Forestry
  - Subcommittee on Hunger, Nutrition, and Family Farms
  - Subcommittee on Production, Income Protection and Price Support
  - Subcommittee on Rural Revitalization, Conservation, Forestry and Credit
- Committee on Appropriations
  - Subcommittee on Agriculture, Rural Development, Food and Drug Administration, and Related Agencies
  - Subcommittee on Defense
  - Subcommittee on Energy and Water Development
  - Subcommittee on Labor, Health and Human Services, Education, and Related Agencies (Chairman)
  - Subcommittee on State, Foreign Operations, and Related Programs
  - Subcommittee on Transportation, Housing and Urban Development, and Related Agencies
- Committee on Health, Education, Labor, and Pensions (Chairman)
  - As Chair of the full committee, Harkin may serve as an ex officio member of all subcommittees.
- Committee on Small Business and Entrepreneurship

== 1992 presidential election ==
=== Primary campaign ===
Harkin ran for President in 1992 as a populist with labor union support. He criticized George H. W. Bush for being out of touch with working-class Americans. Harkin was an early favorite in a small field of five candidates. Harkin won the Iowa caucus and those in Idaho and Minnesota (with help from Senator Paul Wellstone), but he ran poorly in New Hampshire and other primaries and ultimately lost the Democratic Party nomination to Governor Bill Clinton of Arkansas. Harkin was the first Democratic primary contender to drop out and throw his support behind Clinton — a favor that led to a close relationship throughout the Clinton presidency.

Endorsements

- Senator Paul Wellstone (D-Minnesota)
- Commissioner of Agriculture Jim Hightower (D-Texas)
- Representative Lane Evans (D-Illinois)

=== Considered as running mate ===
Harkin figured in running mate searches multiple times after his 1992 presidential campaign. Clinton considered Harkin in 1992 because of his ties to labor and strong support for Clinton after withdrawing from the presidential race. In 2000, Harkin was considered by Al Gore before Gore selected Joe Lieberman. In 2004, presidential nominee John Kerry considered Harkin as a running mate, though Harkin worked to promote the candidacy of then-Governor Tom Vilsack. In 2008, Barack Obama considered Harkin for vice president because of his senior statesman status within the party and his personal closeness to both Bill Clinton and Hillary Clinton. Harkin endorsed Obama's choice of Joe Biden for the nomination, and campaigned for the Obama-Biden ticket.

== Electoral history ==
Tom Harkin electoral history

Iowa's 5th congressional district, 1972

- William J. Scherle (R) (inc.) – 108,596 (55.26%)
- Tom Harkin (D) – 87,937 (44.74%)

Iowa's 5th congressional district, 1974

- Tom Harkin (D) – 81,146 (51.09%)
- William J. Scherle (R) (inc.) – 77,683 (48.91%)

Iowa's 5th congressional district, 1976

- Tom Harkin (D) (inc.) – 135,600 (64.86%)
- Kenneth R. Fulk (R) – 71,377 (34.14%)
- Verlyn Leroy Hayes (American Independent) – 2,075 (0.99%)

Iowa's 5th congressional district, 1978

- Tom Harkin (D) (inc.) – 82,333 (58.93%)
- Julian B. Garrett (R) – 57,377 (41.07%)

Iowa's 5th congressional district, 1980

- Tom Harkin (D) (inc.) – 127,895 (60.22%)
- Cal Hultman (R) – 84,472 (39.78%)

Iowa's 5th congressional district, 1982

- Tom Harkin (D) (inc.) – 93,333 (58.86%)
- Arlyn E. Danker (R) – 65,200 (41.12%)

1984 United States Senate election in Iowa

- Tom Harkin (D) – 716,883 (55.46%)
- Roger Jepsen (R) (inc.) – 564,381 (43.66%)
- Garry De Young (Independence) – 11,014 (0.85%)

1990 United States Senate election in Iowa

- Tom Harkin (D) (inc.) – 535,975 (54.47%)
- Thomas J. Tauke (R) – 446,869 (45.42%)

Democratic Iowa caucuses, 1992

- Tom Harkin – 764 (76.55%)
- Uncommitted – 119 (11.92%)
- Paul Tsongas – 41 (4.11%)
- Bill Clinton – 28 (2.81%)
- Bob Kerrey – 24 (2.41%)
- Jerry Brown – 16 (1.60%)
- Others – 6 (0.60%)

1992 United States presidential election (Democratic primaries)

- Bill Clinton – 10,482,411 (52.01%)
- Jerry Brown – 4,071,232 (20.20%)
- Paul Tsongas – 3,656,010 (18.14%)
- Unpledged – 750,873 (3.73%)
- Bob Kerrey – 318,457 (1.58%)
- Tom Harkin – 280,304 (1.39%)
- Lyndon LaRouche – 154,599 (0.77%)
- Eugene McCarthy – 108,678 (0.54%)
- Charles Woods – 88,948 (0.44%)
- Larry Agran – 58,611 (0.29%)
- Ross Perot – 54,755 (0.27%)
- Ralph Nader – 35,935 (0.18%)
- Louis Stokes – 29,983 (0.15%)
- Angus Wheeler McDonald – 9,900 (0.05%)
- J. Louis McAlpine – 7,911 (0.04%)
- George W. Benns – 7,887 (0.04%)
- Rufus T. Higginbotham – 7,705 (0.04%)
- Tom Howard Hawks – 7,434 (0.04%)
- Stephen Bruke – 5,261 (0.03%)
- Tom Laughin – 5,202 (0.03%)
- Tom Shiekman – 4,965 (0.03%)
- Jeffrey F. Marsh – 2,445 (0.01%)
- George Ballard – 2,067 (0.01%)
- Ray Rollinson – 1,206 (0.01%)
- Leonora Fulani – 402 (0.00%)
- Douglas Wilder – 240 (0.00%)

Iowa United States Senate election, 1996 (Democratic primary)

- Tom Harkin (inc.) – 98,737 (99.19%)
- Others – 810 (0.81%)

1996 United States Senate election in Iowa

- Tom Harkin (D) (inc.) – 634,166 (51.81%)
- Jim Ross Lightfoot (R) – 571,807 (46.71%)
- Sue Atkinson (I) – 9,768 (0.80%)
- Fred Gratzon (Natural Law) – 4,248 (0.35%)
- Joe Sulentic (I) – 1,941 (0.16%)
- Shirley E. Pena (Socialist Workers) – 1,844 (0.15%)

Iowa United States Senate election, 2002 (Democratic primary)

- Tom Harkin (inc.) – 83,505 (99.34%)
- Write-ins – 555 (0.66%)

2002 United States Senate election in Iowa

- Tom Harkin (D) (inc.) – 554,278 (54.18%)
- Greg Ganske (R) – 447,892 (43.78%)
- Tim Harthan (Green) – 11,340 (1.11%)
- Richard J. Moore (Libertarian) – 8,864 (0.87%)

2008 United States Senate election in Iowa

- Tom Harkin (D) (inc.) – 925,630 62.52%
- Christopher Reed (R) – 553,995 37.42%

== Personal life ==
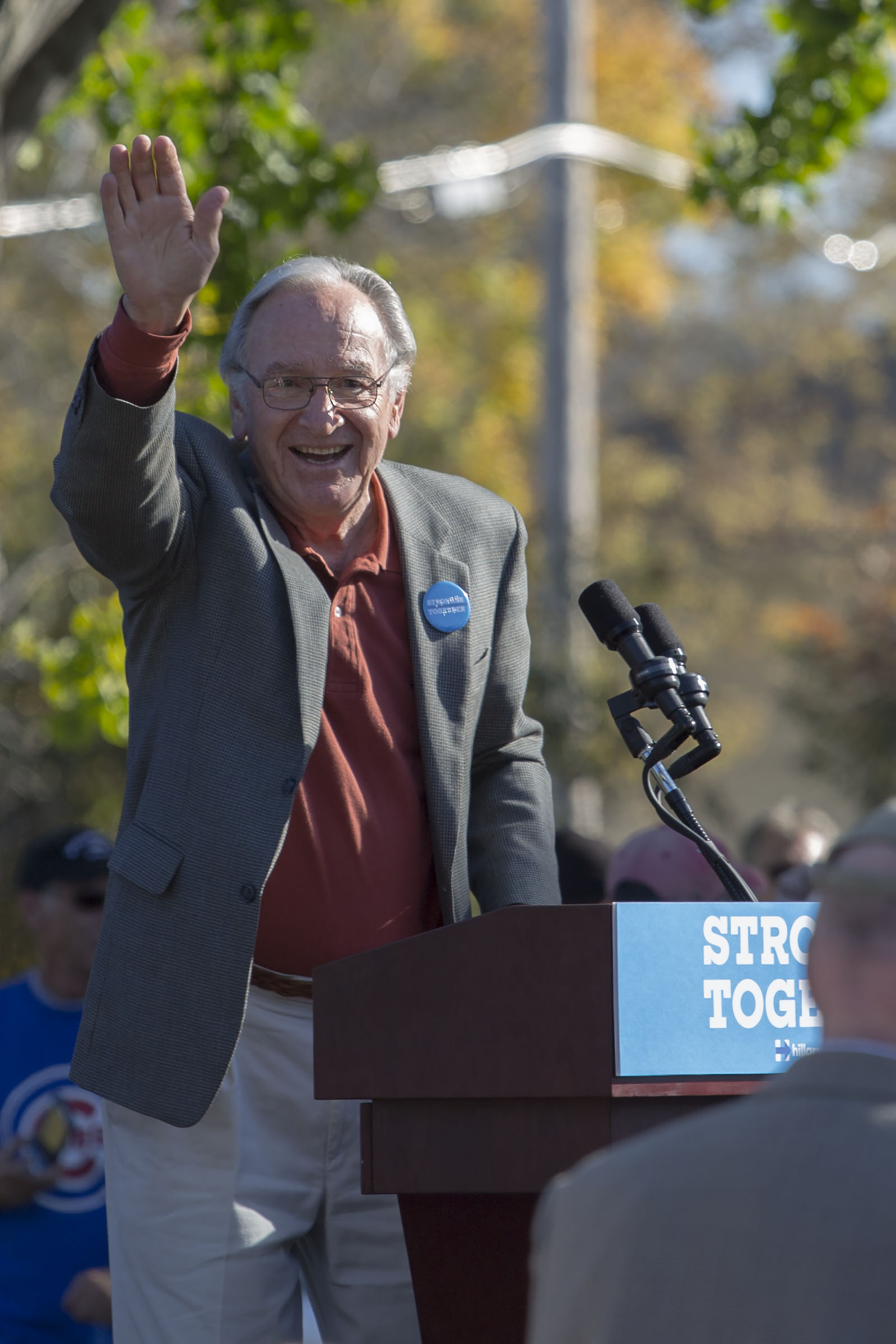
Harkin campaigning for Hillary Clinton in Iowa, November 2016

On July 6, 1968, Harkin, then aged 28, married the former Ruth Raduenz, who was 23. The couple has two children: Amy (born 1976), and Jenny (born 1981). Ruth Harkin is an attorney and was one of the first women in the United States to be elected as a prosecutor when, in 1972, she was elected to the office of county attorney of Story County, Iowa. She served as a deputy counsel for the U.S. Department of Agriculture before joining the Washington law firm of Akin Gump Strauss Hauer & Feld in 1983. In 1993, President Bill Clinton named her chairman and chief executive officer of the Overseas Private Investment Corporation (OPIC). Ruth Harkin left the government and became United Technologies' senior vice president for international affairs and government relations in April 1997, leading their Washington DC office. In 2002, Mrs. Harkin became a director of ConocoPhillips. Mrs. Harkin sat on the Iowa Board of Regents, the body responsible for overseeing the state's public universities.

Senator Harkin made a brief cameo appearance as himself in the political satire Dave (1993), as did his fellow senators Christopher Dodd, Howard Metzenbaum, Paul Simon and Alan K. Simpson.

The Harkins' daughter Amy appeared on the NBC daytime reality series Starting Over from 2003 to 2004, and his voice was heard in several episodes when his daughter spoke to him on the phone. She is a 2004 graduate of Princeton University, and received her master of business administration degree from the UCLA Anderson School of Management in 2007.

In 2015 New York City held its first Disability Pride Parade, and Tom Harkin was its grand marshal. He was also the grand marshal for the Chicago Disability Pride Parade that same year.

As of 2024, Harkin lives in Virginia, and also owns his childhood home in Cumming, Iowa.

== Published works ==
- Harkin, Tom and Thomas, C. E. Five Minutes to Midnight: Why the Nuclear Threat Is Growing Faster Than Ever, Carol Publishing Corporation, 1990. ISBN 1-55972-042-5

== See also ==
- 21st Century Democrats

U.S. House of Representatives
Preceded by William Scherle	Member of the U.S. House of Representatives from Iowa's 5th congressional district 1975–1985	Succeeded by Jim Lightfoot
Party political offices
Preceded by Les AuCoin, Joe Biden, Bill Bradley, Robert Byrd, Tom Daschle, Bill Hefner, Barbara B. Kennelly, George Miller, Tip O'Neill, Paul Tsongas, Tim Wirth	Response to the State of the Union address 1984; Served alongside: Max Baucus, Joe Biden, David L. Boren, Barbara Boxer, Robert Byrd, Dante Fascell, Bill Gray, Dee Huddleston, Carl Levin, Tip O'Neill, Claiborne Pell	Succeeded by Bill Clinton; Bob Graham; Tip O'Neill
Preceded by Dick Clark	Democratic nominee for U.S. Senator from Iowa (Class 2); 1984, 1990, 1996, 2002, 2008	Succeeded by Bruce Braley
U.S. Senate
Preceded by Roger Jepsen	U.S. Senator (Class 2) from Iowa; 1985–2015; Served alongside: Chuck Grassley	Succeeded by Joni Ernst
Preceded by Patrick Leahy	Ranking Member of the Senate Agriculture Committee; 1997–2001, 2001	Succeeded by Thad Cochran
Preceded by Richard Lugar	Chair of the Senate Agriculture Committee; 2001, 2001–2003	Succeeded by Thad Cochran
Preceded by Thad Cochran	Ranking Member of the Senate Agriculture Committee; 2003–2007	Succeeded by Saxby Chambliss
Preceded by Saxby Chambliss	Chair of the Senate Agriculture Committee; 2007–2009	Succeeded by Blanche Lincoln
Preceded by Chris Dodd; Acting	Chair of the Senate Health Committee; 2009–2015	Succeeded by Lamar Alexander
U.S. order of precedence (ceremonial)
Preceded by Barbara Mikulski as Former U.S. Senator	Order of precedence of the United States as Former U.S. Senator	Succeeded by Jeff Bingaman as Former U.S. Senator
