= George Eichhorn =

American politician (born 1954)

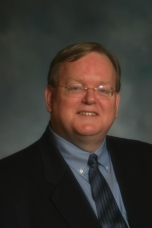

Member of the Iowa House of Representatives
- In office January 8, 2001 – January 7, 2007

Personal details
- Born: December 1, 1954 (age 71) Davenport, Iowa, United States
- Party: Republican
- Spouse: Racheale (Shelly)
- Occupation: Lawyer

George S. Eichhorn (born December 1, 1954) was a Republican member of the Iowa House of Representatives from 2001 until 2007. He was defeated by Democrat McKinley Bailey in the 2006 election.

He ran for the United States Senate in 2008.

In 2010 he ran for Iowa Secretary of State.
