= Jim Ross Lightfoot =

American politician

Jim Lightfoot
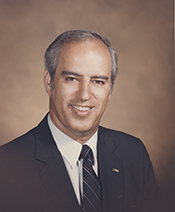

Member of the U.S. House of Representatives from Iowa
- In office January 3, 1985 – January 3, 1997
- Preceded by: Tom Harkin
- Succeeded by: Leonard Boswell
- Constituency: 5th district (1985–1993); 3rd district (1993–1997)

Personal details
- Born: September 27, 1938 (age 87) Sioux City, Iowa, U.S.
- Party: Republican
- Children: 4

Military service
- Allegiance: United States
- Branch/service: United States Army
- Unit: United States Army Reserve

James Ross Lightfoot (born September 27, 1938) is an American businessman-broadcaster who served as a member of the United States House of Representatives from Iowa. He was the Republican nominee for the United States Senate in 1996 and for Governor of Iowa in 1998.

== Early life ==
Lightfoot was born in the Florence Crittenton Home for Unwed Mothers in Sioux City, Iowa. He was raised on a farm near Farragut, Iowa, where he graduated from Farragut High School in 1956.

== Career ==
=== Early career ===
Lightfoot served eight years in the United States Army and United States Army Reserve. He began his career working for IBM as a customer engineer and was eventually transferred to Tulsa, Oklahoma. He also worked as an officer in the Tulsa Police Department.

Returning to his native Iowa in the early-1960s, Lightfoot became a broadcaster on KMA radio, the flagship station of May Broadcasting Company. While at KMA, Lightfoot was also well known as a rodeo announcer and sought-after speaker for various organizations’ events.

=== U.S. House of Representatives ===
He was elected to the U.S. House of Representatives in 1984, after five-term incumbent Tom Harkin gave up the seat to make a successful run for the United States Senate. Lightfoot served there for six terms, compiling a mostly conservative voting record. During his last term, he served as chairman of the subcommittee of the United States House Committee on Appropriations which funded the Treasury Department, Postal Service, White House and other federal agencies. Lightfoot also spent eight years on the United States House Transportation Subcommittee on Aviation dealing with transportation issues. He holds commercial pilot and flight instructor ratings, which have allowed him a wide perspective on the aviation industry.

=== 1996 U.S. Senate election ===
In 1996, conforming to a promise to only serve twelve years in the House of Representatives, he left his seat to run for the Senate against Harkin. His entry into the race came in March. At a severe financial disadvantage, Lightfoot lost the race, after strong pre-election campaigning on Harkin's behalf by Bill Clinton, who carried Iowa by ten points in the presidential election.

=== 1998 Iowa gubernatorial campaign ===
In 1998, at the request of the Republican Party, he ran against then State Senator Tom Vilsack for governor of Iowa. Lightfoot led in polling for most of the campaign, but Harkin's campaigning on Vilsack's behalf enabled Vilsack to win narrowly.

=== Later career ===
In December 1998, Lightfoot became the vice president of Forensic Technology, Inc.

Lightfoot was a senior policy advisor for federal government relations with the Washington, D.C., office of Buchanan Ingersoll & Rooney. He was a non-attorney professional in the firm's Federal Government Relations division.

In 2009, Lightfoot started his own consulting firm, Lightfoot Strategies.

== Personal life ==
Lightfoot and wife Nancy reside in White Oak, Texas. They have four children and four grandchildren.

U.S. House of Representatives
Preceded by Tom Harkin	Member of the U.S. House of Representatives from Iowa's 5th congressional district 1985–1993	Succeeded by Fred Grandy
Preceded by Dave Nagle	Member of the U.S. House of Representatives from Iowa's 3rd congressional district 1993–1997	Succeeded by Leonard Boswell
Party political offices
Preceded by Tom Tauke	Republican nominee for U.S. Senator from Iowa (Class 2); 1996	Succeeded by Greg Ganske
Preceded by Terry Branstad	Republican nominee for Governor of Iowa; 1998	Succeeded by Doug Gross
U.S. order of precedence (ceremonial)
Preceded by Tom Tauke as Former U.S. Representative	Order of precedence of the United States as Former U.S. Representative	Succeeded by Chip Pashayan as Former U.S. Representative
