= 1996 United States Senate election in Iowa =

- November 5, 1996
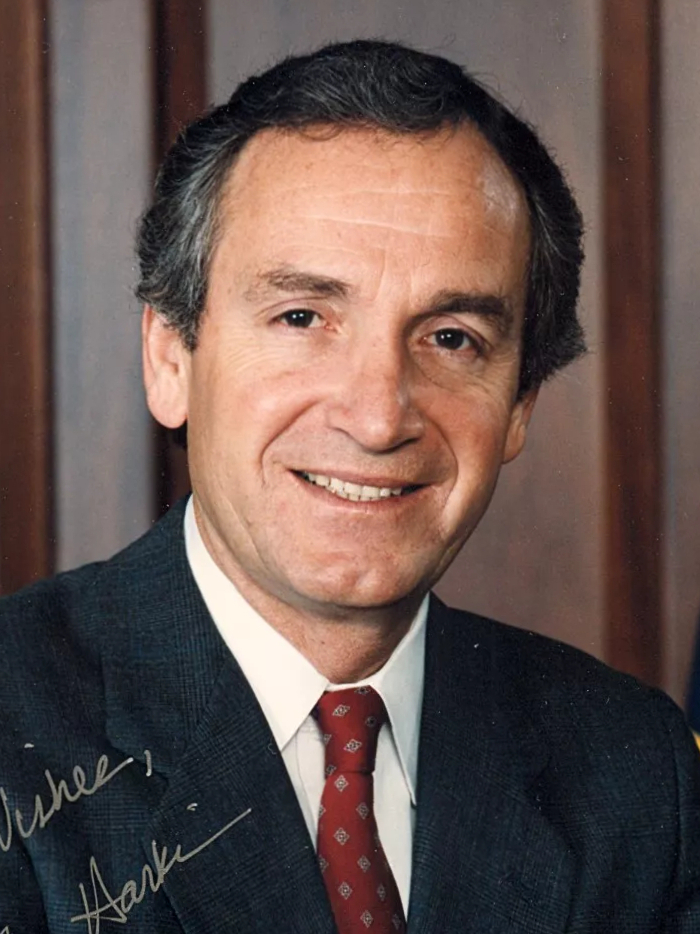

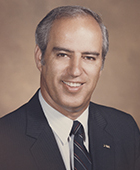
Nominee	Tom Harkin	Jim Ross Lightfoot
Party	Democratic	Republican
Popular vote	634,166	571,807
Percentage	51.81%	46.71%
- County results Harkin: 30–40% 40–50% 50–60% 60–70% Lightfoot: 40–50% 50–60% 60–70% 70–80% 80–90%
U.S. senator before election
Tom Harkin
Democratic
Elected U.S. Senator
Tom Harkin
Democratic

The 1996 United States Senate election in Iowa was held on November 5, 1996. Incumbent Democratic U.S. Senator Tom Harkin sought re-election to a third term in office, and he was challenged by U.S. Congressman Jim Ross Lightfoot from Iowa's 3rd congressional district. Lightfoot had won the Republican primary against two opponents, while Harkin had won his primary uncontested, so both moved on to the general election, where they engaged in a toughly fought campaign. Ultimately, Harkin was successful in his bid and defeated Lightfoot, albeit by the narrowest margin of his career.

== Democratic primary ==
=== Candidates ===
- Tom Harkin, incumbent United States Senator

=== Results ===
Democratic primary results
Party	Candidate	Votes	%
Democratic	Tom Harkin (incumbent)	98,737	99.19%
Democratic	Write-ins	810	0.81%
Total votes		99,547	100.00%

== Republican primary ==
=== Candidates ===
- Jim Ross Lightfoot, United States representative from Shenandoah
- Maggie Tinsman, state senator
- Steve Grubbs, state representative

=== Results ===
Republican primary results
Party	Candidate	Votes	%
Republican	Jim Ross Lightfoot	101,608	61.48%
Republican	Maggie Tinsman	40,955	24.78%
Republican	Steve Grubbs	22,554	13.65%
Republican	Write-ins	153	0.09%
Total votes		165,270	100.00%

== General election ==
=== Results ===
United States Senate election in Iowa, 1996
Party	Candidate	Votes	%	±%
Democratic	Tom Harkin (incumbent)	634,166	51.81%	−2.66%
Republican	Jim Ross Lightfoot	571,807	46.71%	+1.30%
Independent	Sue Atkinson	9,768	0.80%	
Natural Law	Fred Gratzon	4,248	0.35%	
Independent	Joe Sulentic	1,941	0.16%	
Socialist Workers	Shirley E. Pena	1,844	0.15%	
Write-in		280	0.02%	
Majority		62,359	5.09%	−3.96%
Turnout		1,224,054		
Democratic hold		Swing		

== See also ==
- 1996 United States Senate elections
