= Burton E. Sweet =

American politician

Burton Sweet
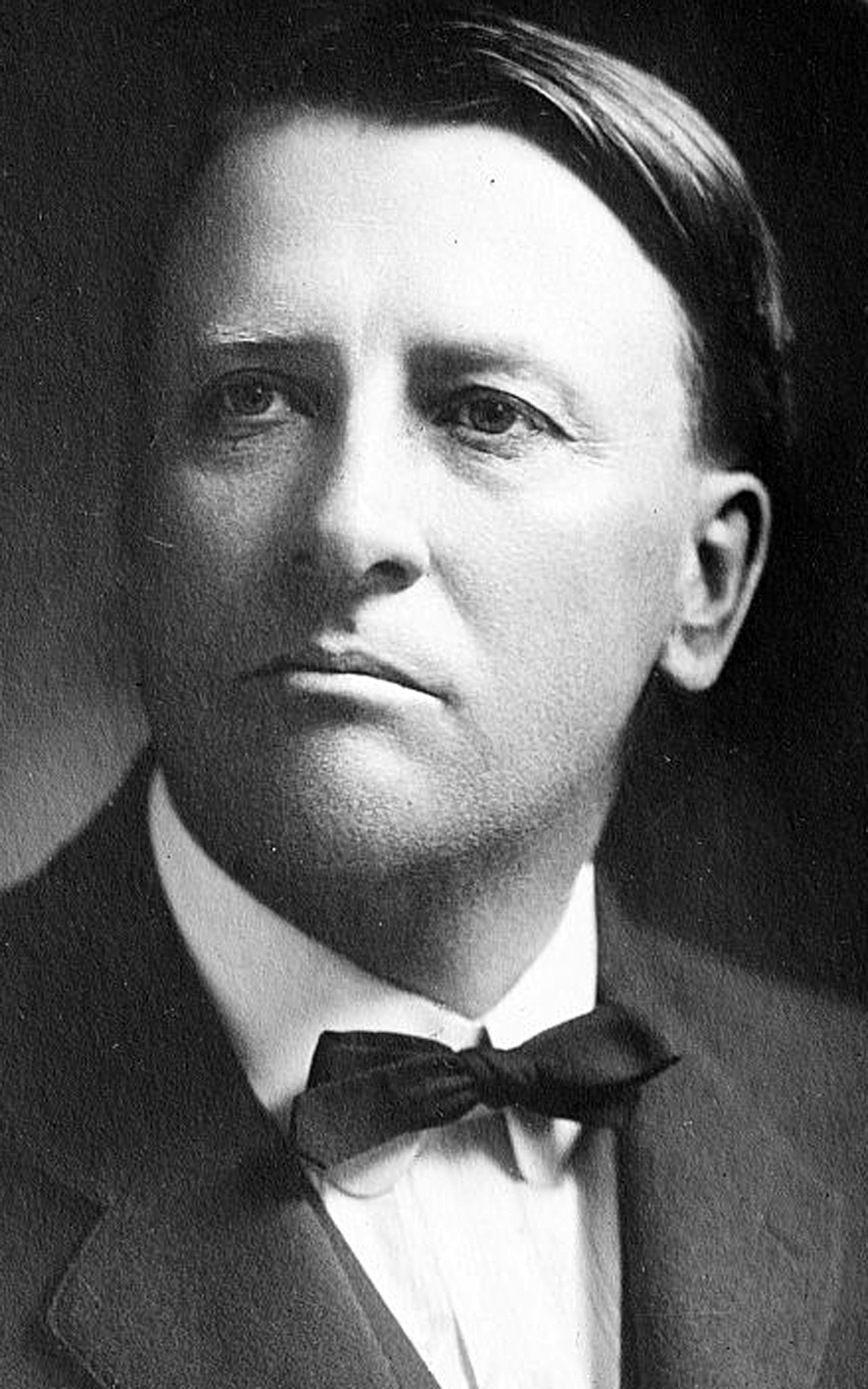

Member of the U.S. House of Representatives from Iowa's 3rd district
- In office March 4, 1915 – March 3, 1923
- Preceded by: Maurice Connolly
- Succeeded by: Thomas J. B. Robinson

Personal details
- Born: December 10, 1867 Waverly, Iowa, U.S.
- Died: January 3, 1957 (aged 89) Waverly, Iowa, U.S
- Party: Republican
- Education: Cornell College; University of Iowa

Burton Erwin Sweet (December 10, 1867 – January 3, 1957) was a four-term Republican U.S. Representative from Iowa's 3rd congressional district, then a wide but short chain of counties in north-central and northeastern Iowa, in the shape of a monkey wrench.

Born on a farm near Waverly, Iowa, Sweet attended the common schools and the Iowa State Normal School at Cedar Falls. He graduated from Cornell College in Mount Vernon, Iowa in 1893, and from the University of Iowa College of Law at Iowa City in 1895. He was admitted to the bar in 1895 and commenced practice in Waverly. He was Waverly's city solicitor from 1896 to 1899. In 1900 he was elected to the first of two two-year terms in the Iowa House of Representatives. In 1902, after 3rd congressional district Congressman and Speaker of the United States House of Representatives David B. Henderson announced his retirement from Congress, Sweet finished third on each convention ballot for the Republican nomination, losing to Benjamin P. Birdsall. In 1904, when Sweet's final term in the legislature ended, he served as delegate to the Republican National Convention. He was also a member of the Republican State Central Committee from 1902 to 1906. Although he was a lawyer, he also owned two sections of farmland.

In 1908, Sweet was an unsuccessful candidate for the Republican nomination for the seat vacated by Congressman Birdsall. He was defeated by Charles E. Pickett, who won the general election and was re-elected to a second term in 1910.

In 1914, Sweet was elected as a Republican to represent Iowa's 3rd congressional district in the Sixty-fourth Congress, replacing incumbent Democratic Congressman Maurice Connolly (who had run for the U.S. Senate). He was re-elected three consecutive times. In 1922, an opportunity to run for the U.S. Senate arose because Iowa Senator William S. Kenyon resigned before the completion of his term to accept an appointment as federal judge, thus forcing a special election. Instead of running for a fifth term in the House, Sweet ran for Kenyon's former seat. In a six-way Republican primary, Sweet lost to insurgent Smith W. Brookhart. In all, Sweet served in the House from March 4, 1915, to March 3, 1923.

Sweet resumed the practice of law. Two years later, however, Sweet had another opportunity to run for the same Senate seat, and by then Brookhart had lost the support of Iowa Republican Party leaders because of his anti-business, pro-union stances, and this time Sweet was Brookhart's only serious challenger in the Republican Primary. However, Brookhart won the Primary again, defeating Sweet again, this time by over 30,000 votes.

Sweet died in Waverly, Iowa, on January 3, 1957. He was interred in Harlington Cemetery.

U.S. House of Representatives
Preceded by Maurice Connolly	Member of the U.S. House of Representatives from Iowa's 3rd congressional district 1915–1923	Succeeded by Thomas J. B. Robinson
