= Albert C. Willford =

American politician (1877–1937)

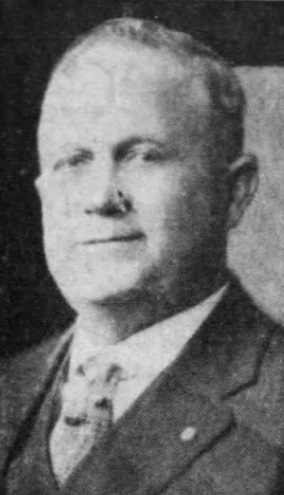
- Des Moines Tribune (Des Moines, Iowa), August 16, 1934

Member of the U.S. House of Representatives from Iowa's 3rd district
- In office March 4, 1933 – January 3, 1935
- Preceded by: Thomas J. B. Robinson
- Succeeded by: John W. Gwynne

Personal details
- Born: Albert Clinton Willford; September 21, 1877 Vinton, Iowa, U.S.
- Died: March 10, 1937 (aged 59) Waterloo, Iowa, U.S.
- Party: Democratic
- Occupation: businessman

Albert Clinton Willford (September 21, 1877 – March 10, 1937) was a Democratic U.S. Representative from Iowa's 3rd congressional district and supporter of Franklin D. Roosevelt's "New Deal." He was elected in 1932, defeated in 1934, and failed to regain his seat in 1936.

Born in Vinton, Iowa, Willford attended the country and town schools, and Tilford's Academy, in Vinton. He was employed as chief engineer of the electric light, power, and water company at Vinton from 1900 to 1907. He moved to Waterloo, Iowa, in 1907 and engaged in the manufacture of ice until 1910, when he engaged in the seed, feed, and coal business.

Before running for Congress he served as a trustee of the Waterloo Public Library (1918–1930), a member of the Black Hawk County Jury Commission (1922–1924), the president of the Iowa Stationary Engineers Association, the president of the Iowa Chapter of the Izaak Walton League (1927–1929), and the president of the Waterloo Baseball Club (1923–1927).

Willford was the third Democrat elected in Iowa's 3rd congressional district since its creation in 1860. He was elected as part of Roosevelt's 1932 landslide, defeating a five-term incumbent congressman, Republican Thomas J. B. Robinson.

Willford served in Congress from March 4, 1933, to January 3, 1935. Like the two earlier Democrats from his district, he was not re-elected to a second term. He was defeated by Republican John W. Gwynne in 1934, and then resumed his former pursuits in Waterloo. He lost an attempt in 1936 to regain his seat.

Another Democrat would not win election in the 3rd district until 1986, when David R. Nagle won election to an open seat created by the retirement of T. Cooper Evans. Nagle would become the first Democrat from the district to serve more than one term.

Willford died on March 10, 1937, shortly after his failed bid to regain his seat. He was interred in Memorial Park Cemetery.

U.S. House of Representatives
Preceded by Thomas J. B. Robinson	Member of the U.S. House of Representatives from Iowa's 3rd congressional district 1933–1935	Succeeded by John W. Gwynne
