= Eunice Gibbs Allyn =

American journalist

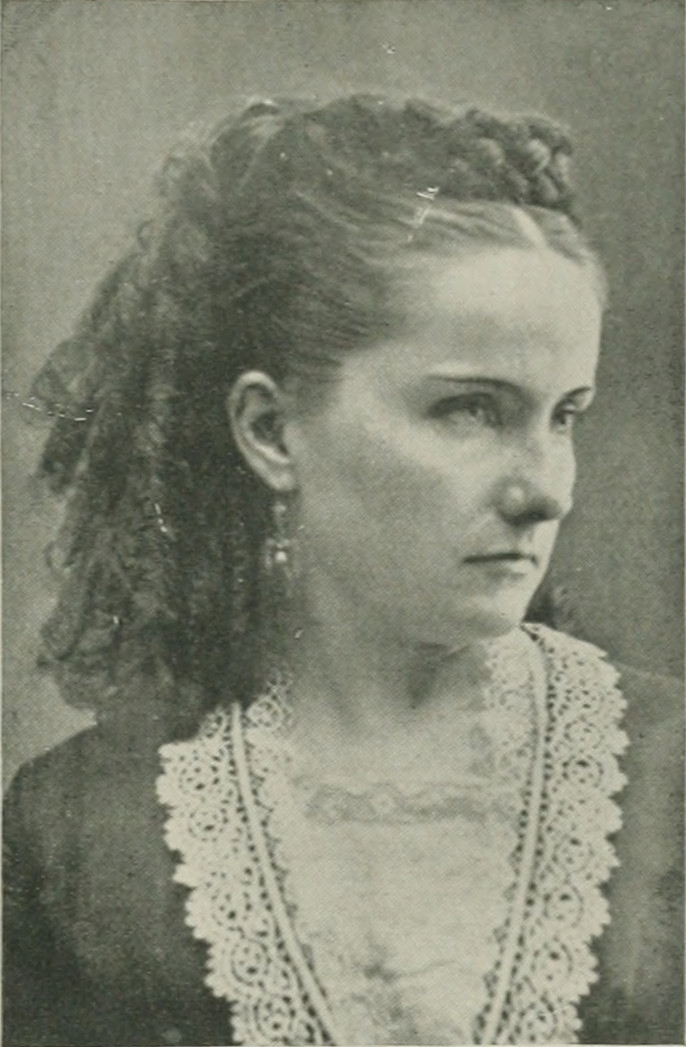
- Portrait photo in A Woman of the Century
- Born: Eunice Eloisae Gibbs; 1847; Brecksville, Ohio, US
- Died: June 30, 1916 (aged 68–69); Dubuque, Iowa
- Occupations: correspondent; author; songwriter; illustrator; painter
- Spouse: Clarence Gilman Allyn (m. 1873; died 1911)
- Relatives: Mary Newbury Adams (aunt); Harriet Bishop (mother's cousin); Sydney Smith (father's relative)
- Writing career
- Pen name: (multiple)
- Genres: poetry; prose
- Notable work: The Cats' Convention

Eunice Gibbs Allyn (née, Gibbs; pen names, (multiple); 1847 – June 30, 1916) was an American correspondent, author, songwriter, illustrator, and painter. She intended to become a teacher, but her mother dissuaded her so she remained at home, entering into society, and writing in a quiet way for the local papers while using various pen names in order to avoid displeasing one of her brothers, who did not wish to have a "bluestocking" in the family.

Allyn served as the Washington correspondent for the Chicago Inter Ocean, as well as a writer for the St. Louis Globe-Democrat and the New York World. She won distinction as an artist and lecturer. For eight years, Allyn served as president of the Dubuque, Iowa branch of the Woman's Christian Temperance Union (WCTU).

== Early life and education ==
Eunice Eloisae Gibbs was born in 1847, in Brecksville, Ohio, a suburb of Cleveland, Ohio. Her father, Dr. Sidney Smith Gibbs, hailed from Schoharie County, New York, and her mother, Eunice Lucinda Newberry, was from St. Lawrence County, New York. Dr. Gibbs was practicing medicine in Brecksville when he married Miss Newberry, who was a successful teacher. He was a relative of the Anglican cleric, wit, and writer, Sydney Smith. Allyn was a niece of Mary Newbury Adams. Allyn's mother was a cousin of Harriet Bishop.

The family consisted of four children, of whom Eunice was the third. Adrian Hoxey Gibbs was a brother. After various changes of climate in search of health, Dr. Gibbs died young. The mother and children then moved from Jackson, Michigan, to Cleveland, where Eunice was graduated with honors from the high school.

== Career ==
Allyn intended to become a teacher, but her mother dissuaded her and Allyn remained at home, entering into society and writing quietly for the local papers. Her articles were signed using various pen names in order to avoid displeasing one of her brothers, who did not wish to have a "bluestocking" in the family. Her first published poems appeared in the Cleveland Plain Dealer, when she was only thirteen years old. Besides composing poems for recitation in school, she often wrote songs, both words and music, when she could not find songs suited to various occasions.

In 1873, she married Clarence Gilman Allyn (1850–1911), of Nyack, New York. After spending several years at Nyack, New London, Connecticut, and Auburn, New York, they moved to Dubuque, Iowa. Before her marriage, she gained valuable experience as the Washington correspondent of the Chicago Inter Ocean, a position which she filled for a year, during which time she also wrote numerous articles for the St. Louis Globe-Democrat, the New York World. Before and since marriage, she also wrote for various New York City, Boston, Indianapolis, Philadelphia, and Chicago journals. She was characterized as a pointed, incisive writer whose prose and poetry had an aim, a central thought.

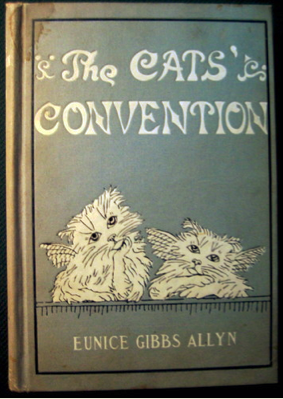
The Cats' Convention

Published in 1909 by Cochrane Publishing Co., The Cats' Convention was reviewed by The New York Times and Watson's Jeffersonian Magazine. The book is illustrated with drawings of many cats of various styles, some beautiful and others ugly, all created by Allyn. The Cats' Convention is included in the Iowa Collection, Historical Department of the State Historical Society of Iowa. 388

Allyn won distinction as an artist. Several of her landscape paintings were hung at the 1904 St. Louis World's Fair. In 1910, one of her paintings was hung with the permanent collection in the Art Room of Dubuque's Carnegie-Stout Public Library.

== Personal life ==
In Dubuque, Allyn inaugurated many reforms and educational movements, doing the work, not for notoriety, but prompted by her desire to do something towards lifting up humanity. Allyn was a prominent member of the Dubuque Ladies' Literary Union, and for eight years, she served as president of the Dubuque branch of the WCTU.

When she was a child, Allyn received a daguerreotype of Hole in the Day from her mother's cousin, Harriet Bishop. In 1903, Allyn presented the daguerreotype to the Minnesota Historical Society.

In religion, Allyn affiliated with the Episcopal Church but was also an admirer of Oriental philosophy.

== Death and legacy ==
Eunice Gibbs Allyn died at her home in Dubuque on June 30, 1916, following a lengthy illness. Allyn and her husband are buried at the city's Linwood Cemetery. An effort began two years before her death to collect her literary works for preservation in the Iowa State Historical Society archives.

== Selected works ==
=== Songs ===
- "Her one star" (words and music)
- "Vesper bells" (words and music)
- "The King of all painters", 1898 (words and music)
- "The Thanksgiving hymn of the Republic", 1898 (words and music)

=== Articles ===
- "The Evolution of the Greek Flat", Records of the Past, 1907 (text)

=== Short stories ===
- "My Spirit Wife", Every Where, 1909 (text)

=== Novels ===
- One thousand smiles, 1898
- The Cats' Convention, 1909
