= Joseph C. Johnston =

American politician

Member of the Iowa House of Representatives
- In office 1969–1973

Personal details
- Born: October 26, 1938 Waterloo, Iowa, United States
- Died: September 19, 2015 (aged 76)
- Party: Democratic
- Spouse(s): Judy Johnston (1957–?), Amanda Potterfield (1983–2015)
- Children: 5
- Education: University of Iowa
- Occupation: lawyer

Joseph C. Johnston (October 26, 1938 – September 19, 2015) was an American politician in the state of Iowa.

Joe Johnston was born in Waterloo, Iowa. He was a lawyer. He served in the Iowa House of Representatives from 1969 to 1973 as a Democrat. He was the Democratic nominee for U.S. Congress from Iowa's 3rd congressional district, running unsuccessfully against Republican incumbent Cooper Evans. Following his death, the Iowa House of Representatives passed a resolution "in appreciation of his service."
