= Linwood Cemetery =

Linwood Cemetery may refer to:

== United States ==
Listed alphabetically by state

- Linwood Cemetery, in Colchester, Connecticut
- Linwood Cemetery (Columbus, Georgia), in Georgia
- Linwood Cemetery, in the Pleasant Hill Historic District in Macon, Georgia
- Linwood Cemetery (Dubuque), in Iowa
- Linwood Cemetery, in Haverhill, Massachusetts
- Linwood Cemetery, in Graham, North Carolina

== Elsewhere ==
- Linwood Cemetery, Christchurch, in Christchurch, New Zealand
