= Benjamin P. Birdsall =

American politician

Benjamin Pixley Birdsall
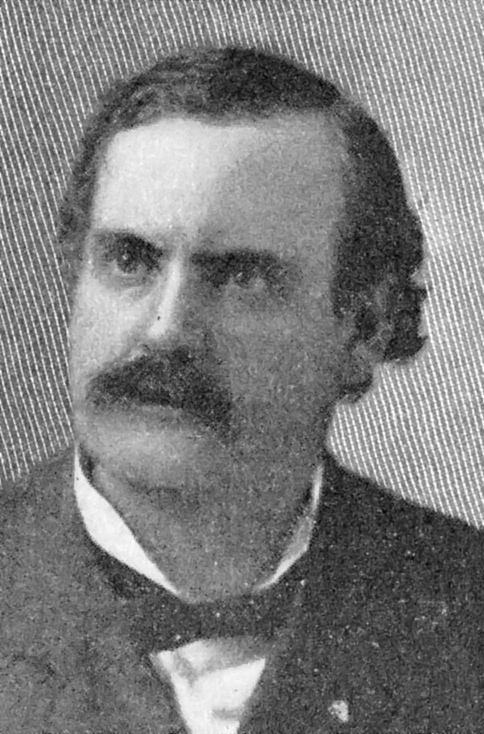

District judge of the 11th judicial district of Iowa
- In office January 1893 – October 1900

Member of the U.S. House of Representatives from Iowa's 3rd district
- In office March 4, 1903 – March 3, 1909
- Preceded by: David B. Henderson
- Succeeded by: Charles E. Pickett

Personal details
- Born: October 26, 1858 Weyauwega, Wisconsin, U.S.
- Died: May 16, 1916 (aged 57) Clarion, Iowa, U.S.
- Resting place: Evergreen Cemetery
- Party: Republican
- Education: University of Iowa

Benjamin Pixley Birdsall (October 26, 1858 – May 16, 1916) was a three-term Republican U.S. Representative from Iowa's 3rd congressional district during the first decade of the 20th century.

== Biography ==
Born in Weyauwega, Wisconsin, Birdsall attended the common schools of Iowa and the University of Iowa, Iowa City. He studied law, was admitted to the bar in 1878 and practiced in Clarion, Iowa. He served as district judge of the eleventh judicial district of Iowa from January 1893 to October 1900.

In 1902, Birdsall was elected as a Republican to the Fifty-eighth Congress, after the incumbent, Speaker of the United States House of Representatives David B. Henderson chose not to run for re-election. Birdsall defeated former Iowa Governor Horace Boies in that race. He was re-elected twice, serving in the Fifty-ninth, and Sixtieth Congresses.

According to the November 1903 Congressional Directory, Birdsall "has been twice married—his first wife, Bertha H. Shultz, deceased 1886; remarried in 1888 to Belle Johnston, of Clarion."

In 1908, he filed for re-election a third time, but fellow Republicans Burton E. Sweet and Charles E. Pickett also sought the Republican nomination. In February 1908 Birdsall pulled out of the race, explaining that he wished to return to the practice of law. In all he served in Congress from March 4, 1903 to March 3, 1909. He resumed the practice of law in Clarion, where he died on May 16, 1916. He was interred in Evergreen Cemetery.

U.S. House of Representatives
Preceded by David B. Henderson	Member of the U.S. House of Representatives from Iowa's 3rd congressional district 1903–1909	Succeeded by Charles E. Pickett
