= Thomas J. B. Robinson =

American politician (1868–1958)

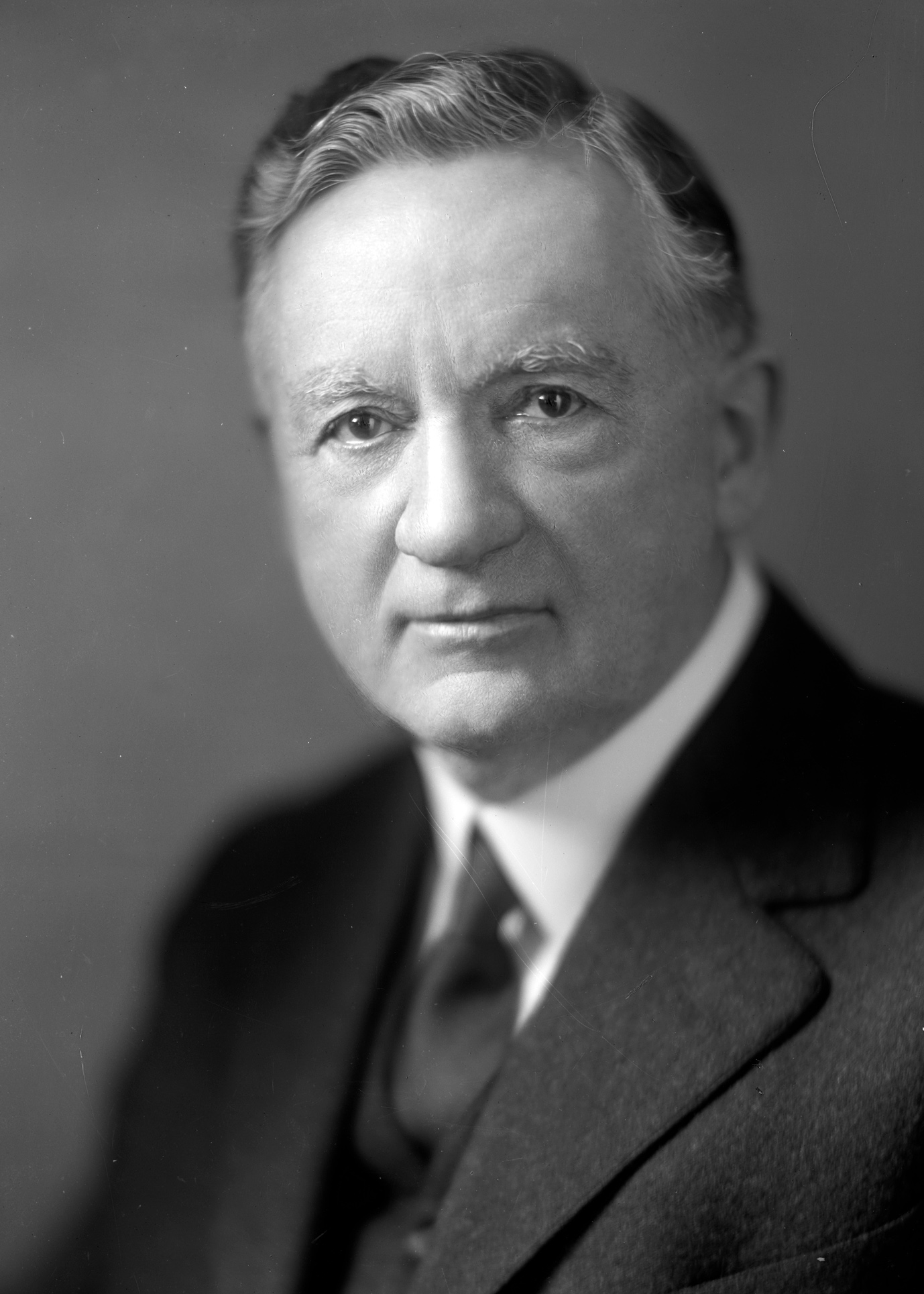

Member of the U.S. House of Representatives from Iowa's 3rd district
- In office March 4, 1923 – March 3, 1933
- Preceded by: Burton E. Sweet
- Succeeded by: Albert C. Willford

Member of the Iowa Senate from the 43rd district
- In office January 13, 1913 – January 7, 1917
- Preceded by: John Hammill
- Succeeded by: Arthur L. Rule

Personal details
- Born: Thomas John Bright Robinson; August 12, 1868 New Diggings, Wisconsin, U.S.
- Died: January 27, 1958 (aged 89) Hampton, Iowa, U.S.
- Party: Republican
- Spouse: Belle Clinton (m. 1888; died 1943)
- Occupation: Banker; politician

Thomas John Bright Robinson (August 12, 1868 – January 27, 1958) was a Republican U.S. Representative from Iowa's 3rd congressional district. Elected in an era in which Republicans held every Iowa U.S. House seat, Robinson served five terms before losing in the 1932 general election.

Born in New Diggings, Wisconsin, Robinson moved with his parents to Hampton, Iowa, in 1870. He attended the public schools and the Hampton High School. A farmer, Robinson also served as president of the Citizens National Bank of Hampton from 1907 to 1923, as a member of the Hampton Board of Education, and on the board of trustees of Cornell College in Mount Vernon, Iowa.

Robinson was elected to one four-year term in the Iowa Senate in 1912, and served as delegate to many Republican State conventions.

In 1922, Robinson was elected as a Republican to represent Iowa's 3rd congressional district in the U.S. House. During the 1920s, no Democrat was elected to any of Iowa's U.S. House seats, and every incumbent Republican congressman from Iowa who was renominated by their party was elected in the November general election. However, in 1932, the Roosevelt landslide carried many Democrats into the House, and the former Republican majority lost 101 seats. Running for a sixth consecutive term, Robinson lost a close race to Albert C. Willford. Robinson had served in the Sixty-eighth and the four succeeding Congresses, serving from March 4, 1923 to March 3, 1933.

Returning to Iowa, Robinson engaged in the real estate and investment business. He died in Hampton on January 27, 1958, and was interred in Hampton Cemetery.

U.S. House of Representatives
Preceded by Burton E. Sweet	Member of the U.S. House of Representatives from Iowa's 3rd congressional district 1923–1933	Succeeded by Albert C. Willford
