= Oran Pape =

American football player and state trooper (1904–1936)

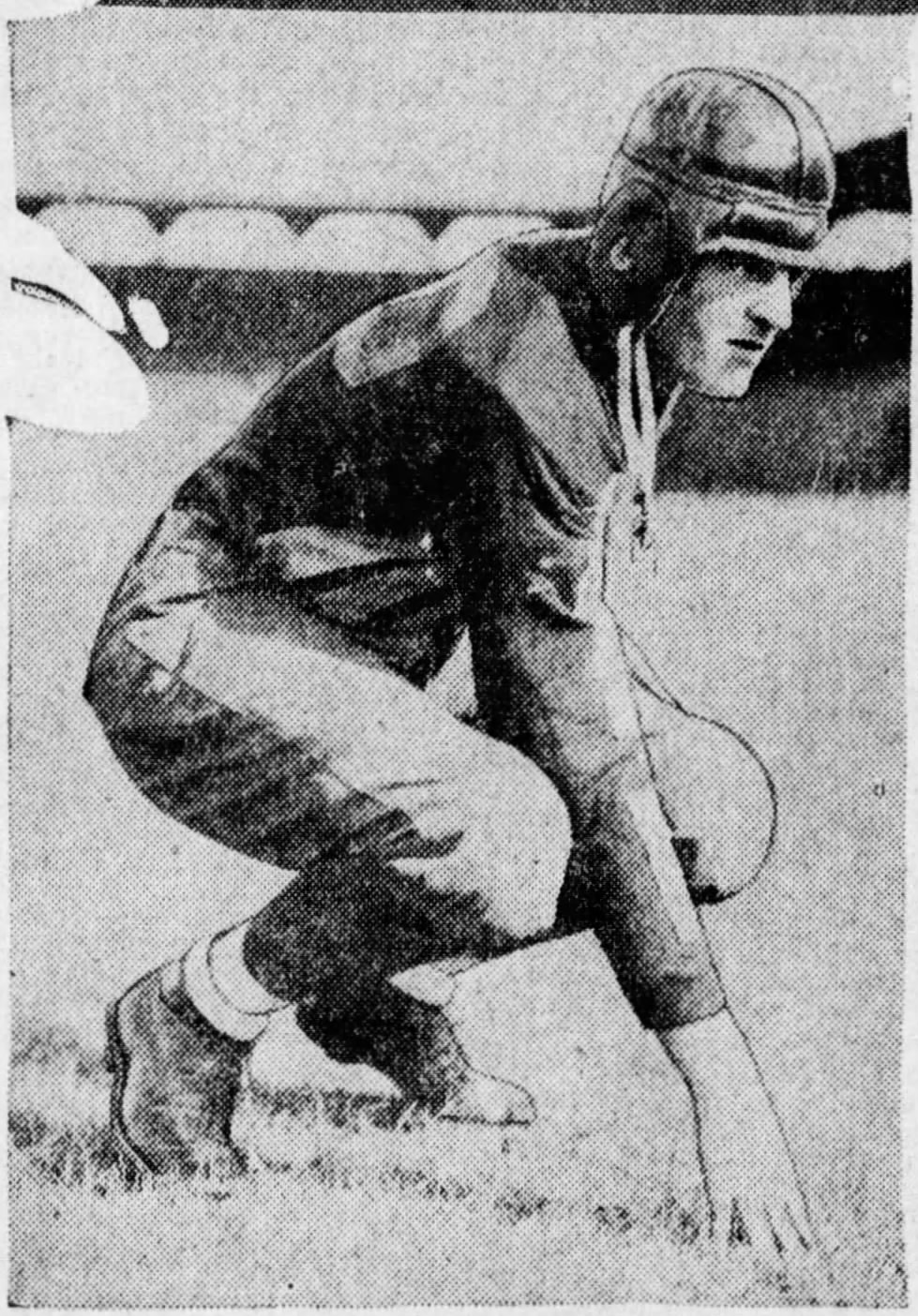

Profile
- Position: Running back

Personal information
- Born: March 10, 1904; Wahpeton, Iowa, U.S.
- Died: April 30, 1936 (aged 32); Muscatine, Iowa, U.S.

Career information
- College: Iowa

Career history
- Green Bay Packers (1930); Minneapolis Red Jackets (1930); Providence Steam Roller (1931); Boston Braves (1932); Staten Island Stapletons (1932)

Awards and highlights
- Second-team All-Big Ten (1929)
- Stats at Pro Football Reference

Oran Henry Pape (March 10, 1904 – April 30, 1936) was a member of the Iowa State Patrol in the United States. He is the first member of the Patrol to have been murdered in the line of duty. Prior to joining the Patrol, Pape played professional American football.

== Football career ==
Pape played high school football at Dubuque Senior High School, where he was part of the 1924 state championship football team. He then played college football at the University of Iowa. Following college, he played in the National Football League for the Green Bay Packers, the Minneapolis Red Jackets, the Providence Steam Roller, the Boston Braves, and the Staten Island Stapletons. Pape was a member of the 1930 Green Bay Packers NFL Championship team. Pape left the NFL in 1934, and returned to Iowa.

== Police career and death ==
Pape attended the State Police Academy at Camp Dodge. He was appointed to the newly formed Iowa Highway Patrol (later Iowa State Patrol) in August 1935, one of the first men to become an officer in the Patrol. On April 28, 1936, Pape was patrolling U.S. Highway 61 near Muscatine, Iowa. He noticed a car that had been reported stolen. After pulling the car over, Pape approached the car. The driver, Roscoe Barton, pointed his gun at Pape and ordered him into his car. Barton drove away with Pape as his hostage. A short while later, Pape saw an opportunity to overpower Barton, and the two began struggling. During the struggle, Barton was shot in the head, and Pape was shot in the abdomen.

Both men were taken to Hershey Hospital in Muscatine. Barton died from his injuries soon after arriving at the hospital. Pape was treated for his gunshot wound, however his condition eventually took a turn for the worse. Doctors were unable to transfuse blood into him because of his collapsed veins. Pape died at 2:40pm on April 30. He was buried at Linwood Cemetery in Dubuque. His badge number 40 was retired from service.

== Legacy ==
Pape's murder is one of the main reasons the Patrol began the practice of "cross drawing" guns. In this practice, officers wear their guns opposite their strong arm. In theory, an officer would be able to hold on to a person with their strong arm and be able to draw their weapon at the same time. This practice is no longer used, with troopers now carrying their sidearms on their strong side.

The I-80 bridges over the Cedar River in Cedar County, Iowa, are named in his honor (Trooper Oran Pape Memorial Bridge).

Pape would remain the only Iowa State Patrol officer to be killed by gunfire until the murder of Sergeant Jim Smith in Grundy Center in 2021.
