= John W. Gwynne =

American politician (1889–1972)

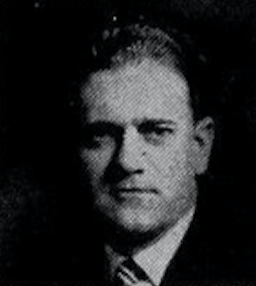
- Gwynne in 1937

Member of the U.S. House of Representatives from Iowa's 3rd district
- In office January 3, 1935 – January 3, 1949
- Preceded by: Albert C. Willford
- Succeeded by: H. R. Gross

Personal details
- Born: John Williams Gwynne; October 20, 1889 Victor, Iowa
- Died: July 5, 1972 (aged 82) Waterloo, Iowa
- Party: Republican
- Education: University of Iowa College of Law
- Occupation: Lawyer

Military service
- Allegiance: United States of America
- Branch/service: United States Army
- Years of service: 1917–1919
- Rank: Second lieutenant
- Unit: 88th Infantry Division; 313th Trench Mortar Battery
- Battles/wars: World War I

John Williams Gwynne (October 20, 1889 – July 5, 1972) was a seven-term Republican U.S. representative from Iowa's 3rd congressional district, and a Federal Trade Commission member and chairman during the Eisenhower administration.

== Personal background ==
Born in Victor, Iowa, on October 20, 1889, Gwynne attended public schools. He graduated from the University of Iowa College of Law at Iowa City, Iowa, in 1914, and was admitted to the bar the same year. He then commenced practice in Waterloo, Iowa, and also engaged in agricultural pursuits.

During the First World War, Gwynne served as a second lieutenant in the 313th Trench Mortar Battery of the United States Army's 88th Infantry Division, from 1917 to 1919.

He later served as a judge of the municipal court of Waterloo from 1920 to 1926, and as County Attorney of Black Hawk County, Iowa, from 1929 to 1934.

== Congress ==
In 1934, Gwynne ran for Congress against incumbent Democratic Congressman Albert C. Willford. Willford's election in 1932, as part of the Roosevelt landslide, was only the third time that Iowa's 3rd congressional district had elected a Democrat. Gwynne defeated Willford in the general election, and was then re-elected six times. He served in the 74th United States Congress and in the six succeeding Congresses, from January 3, 1935, to January 3, 1949. In 1948, Gwynne lost his seat when fellow Republican H.R. Gross, a popular radio news commentator, defeated Gwynne's bid for the Republican nomination.

== Federal Trade Commission ==
President Dwight D. Eisenhower appointed Gwynne to the Federal Trade Commission in 1953, and appointed fellow Waterloo native Edward F. Howrey as its chair. When Howrey resigned as chair in 1955, Gwynne replaced him, and served as FTC chair until 1959.

He retired to Waterloo, where he died July 5, 1972. He was interred in Memorial Park Cemetery.

U.S. House of Representatives
Preceded by Albert C. Willford	Member of the U.S. House of Representatives from Iowa's 3rd congressional district 1935–1949	Succeeded by Harold R. Gross
