= 12th Iowa Infantry Regiment =

- Iowa state flag
- Active: October 18, 1861, to July 21, 1865
- Country: United States
- Allegiance: Union
- Branch: Infantry
- Engagements: Battle of Shiloh; Battle of Corinth; Battle of Port Gibson; Battle of Raymond; Battle of Champion's Hill; Battle of Big Black River; Siege of Vicksburg; Battle of Atlanta; Battle of Nashville

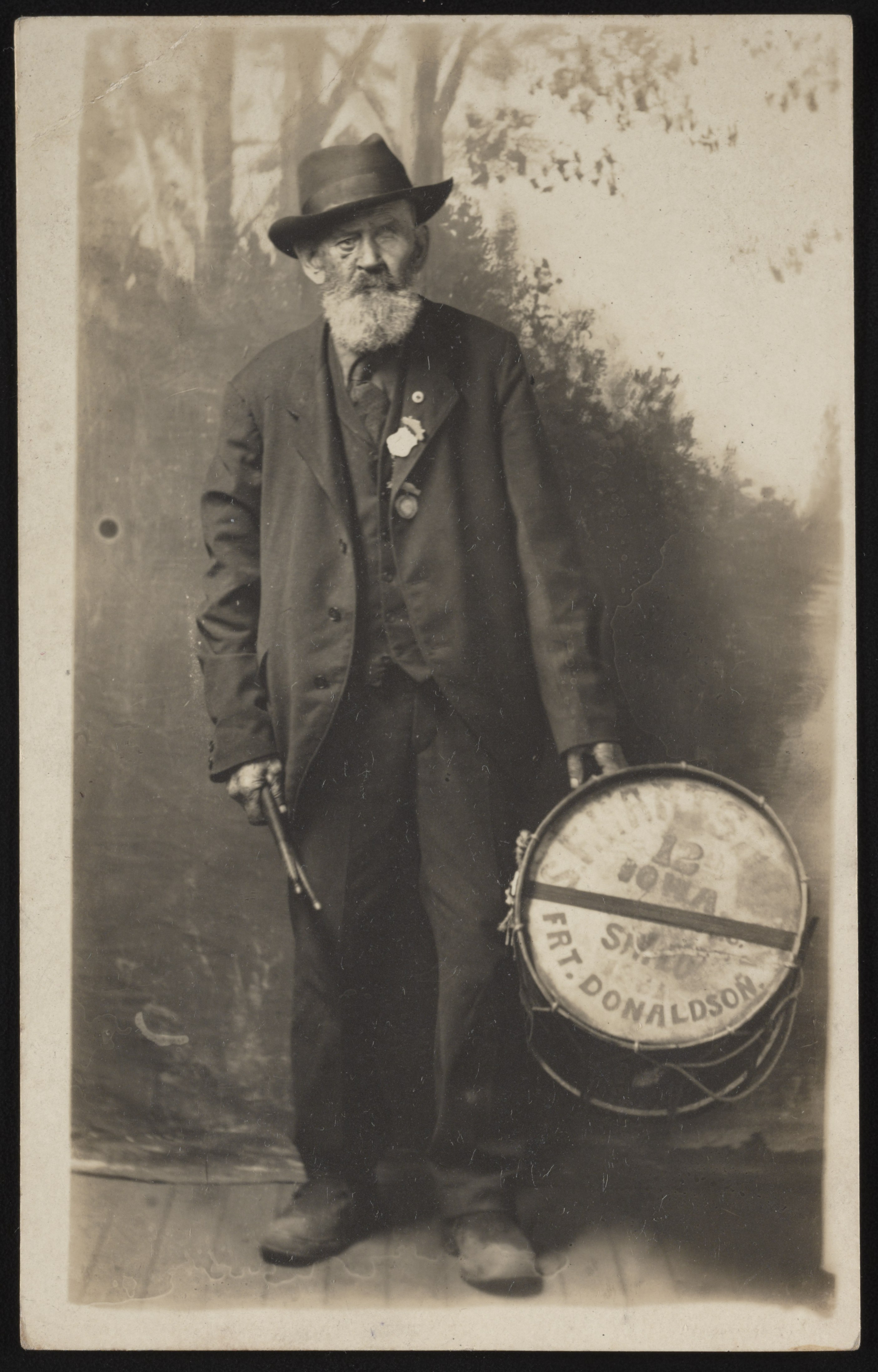
Union veteran drummer Sumner Flint Hartshorn of Co. C, 12th Iowa Infantry Regiment. From the Liljenquist Family Collection of Civil War Photographs, Prints and Photographs Division, Library of Congress

The 12th Iowa Infantry Regiment was an infantry regiment that served in the Union Army during the American Civil War.

== History ==
The 12th Iowa Volunteer Infantry was organized at Dubuque in October and November 1861, and was mustered in at intervals during those two months. It left Iowa late in November 1861, and went into quarters at Benton Barracks, St. Louis, for two months. Like its predecessors at the Barracks, the 12th suffered greatly there from diseases. Seventy-five members of the regiment died of measles, pneumonia or typhoid contracted there.

At Smithland, Kentucky, it joined General Ulysses Grant for the movement upon Fort Henry, was present at the capture of the Fort. It then moved to Fort Donelson, where it took part in the fight and assault which resulted in victory. It won glory for itself at the Battle of Shiloh on the battle's bloody first day (April 6, 1862). It did so by fighting in the advance until sundown, and by holding back the enemy while other regiments withdrew to a new point and waited the arrival of Maj. Gen. Don Carlos Buell. The regiment, together with the 8th and 14th Iowa Infantry Regiments, comprised four-fifths of that advance line, and surrendered only when surrounded by ten times their numbers.

Those members of the regiment who escaped capture at Shiloh, including future Speaker of the U.S. House of Representatives David B. Henderson, were assigned to the "Union Brigade." The Union Brigade fought in the Second Battle of Corinth and others, before being sent to Davenport, Iowa, for re-organization, and remaining there during the winter of 1862–63. Meanwhile, many of the members of the regiment who were captured at Shiloh were paroled on January 1, 1863, and exchanged at Benton Barracks, and soon thereafter went to Rolla, Missouri, which was threatened by the forces of Brigadier General John S. Marmaduke. They returned on the January 15, 1863, to St. Louis, where they were again stationed. Lieut. Col. John P. Coulter resigned and was succeeded by Major John A. Edgington, and the latter as major by Capt. John H. Stibbs of D Company.

The regiment was reorganized about April 1, 1863, and became part of General Sherman's command. It participated in the movements of that division during the Vicksburg Campaign, though it was in reserve at the May 22 assault. After Vicksburg surrendered, the regiment was engaged at Jackson, Mississippi, and was in the skirmish at and capture of Brandon, Mississippi. It went into camp near Bear Creek on July 23 and remained there until October 10. Lieut. Col. Edgington resigned, Maj. Stibbs became a lieutenant colonel and was succeeded as major by Capt. Edward M. Van Duzee.

In October 1863, the regiment was in a skirmish at Brownsville, Arkansas. It then proceeded to Vicksburg, Memphis, Tennessee, La Grange, Tennessee, and Chewalla, where it remained on railroad guard duty until near the close of January 1864. While there, it broke up the guerrilla bands that were pillaging the country, and built a strong fort. It was ordered to join the forces for the Meridian raid, but reached Vicksburg too late to take part, and went into camp.

Having been mustered in as a veteran organization, the reenlisted men were sent home on a furlough in March 1864. In their absence, the non-veterans, numbering about 70, accompanied the 35th Iowa Volunteer Infantry Regimenton the Red River Campaign and was in battle at Lake Chicot. On their return from home the men reached Memphis on May 2, 1864, and were joined by the detachment in mid-June 1864.

In May 1864, six companies under Lieut. Col. Stibbs, went to the mouth of the White River, established a military post and left A and F Companies under Captain J. R. C. Hunter. The command proceeded to Tupelo, Mississippi, where it was engaged in July. The regiment while acting as a train guard, was attacked by a Confederate brigade, but repelled it. In the subsequent fighting, it occupied the most dangerous post and received special commendations of the commanding general.

Returning to Memphis, the regiment moved to La Grange, then to Holly Springs, Mississippi (via Lumpkin's Mills), remaining on duty there for some time. In the meantime, the detachment at White River was protecting the residents of that section and building a stockade. Before daybreak on June 5, 1864, the small force of fewer than fifty men was attacked by a force of 400, in an attack so sudden that the men were compelled to fight in their shirts only. A number of the enemy gained the stockade at one side, but Sergeant Isaac Cottle and Corporal George Hunter, armed with revolvers, attacked them and drove them out in confusion. Hunter was shot dead and Cottle was so severely wounded that he died soon thereafter. The entire besieging force was finally driven off, with over fifty killed (including their commanding officer), wounded or taken prisoner.

Joining the regiment at Holly Springs, this detachment accompanied it to Oxford, Mississippi, then to Memphis, and eventually to De Valls Bluff, Arkansas, and Brownsville in search of Maj. Gen. Sterling Price. With ten days' rations it marched 350 miles in nineteen days to Cape Girardeau, Missouri, via Jacksonport, Arkansas, and Jackson, Missouri. From St. Louis it proceeded to the Missouri cities of Jefferson City, Smithton, Sedalia, Lexington and Independence, into Kansas. It pursued Price to Harrisonville, Missouri, but was unable to catch him, and returned to St. Louis.

The non-veterans and some of the officers were mustered out, with Lieut. Col. Stibbs remaining as commanding officer. Moving to Nashville, the regiment aided in the defense of that city, and captured two flags in a December 1864 battle. It joined in the pursuit of Nashville's attackers as far as Clinton, Tennessee, then proceeded to Eastport, Mississippi, where it assisted in building quarters and fortifications.

Maj. Samuel G. Knee took command after Lieut. Col. Stibbs was called to Washington, D.C. in January 1865 to become a member of a military tribunal. Stibbs' tribunal tried Capt. Henry Wirz, who was held responsible for the inhumane conditions of Camp Sumter, the Confederate prisoner of war camp in Andersonville, Georgia.

In February 1865 the regiment was ordered to assist with the siege of Mobile, Alabama, where it was engaged at Spanish Fort, Alabama. In the Battle of Spanish Fort the regiment fought in the front line and occupied an exposed position for thirteen days and nights. After the siege of Mobile, it moved to Montgomery, then to Selma. It remained in guard and garrison duty until early 1866, when it was mustered out. Lieut. Col. Stibbs received a merited promotion to colonel.

== Total strength and casualties ==
Total enrollment was 1473. The original strength of the regiment was 926 soldiers. Gaining 55 recruits, it grew to 981.

The regiment lost 5 officers and 114 enlisted men who were killed in action or who died of their wounds and 4 officers and 205 enlisted men who died of disease, for a total of 328 fatalities. 222 were wounded.

== Commanders ==
- Colonel Joseph Jackson Woods

== See also ==
- List of Iowa Civil War Units
- Iowa in the American Civil War
