= H. R. Gross =

United States Congressman (1899–1987)

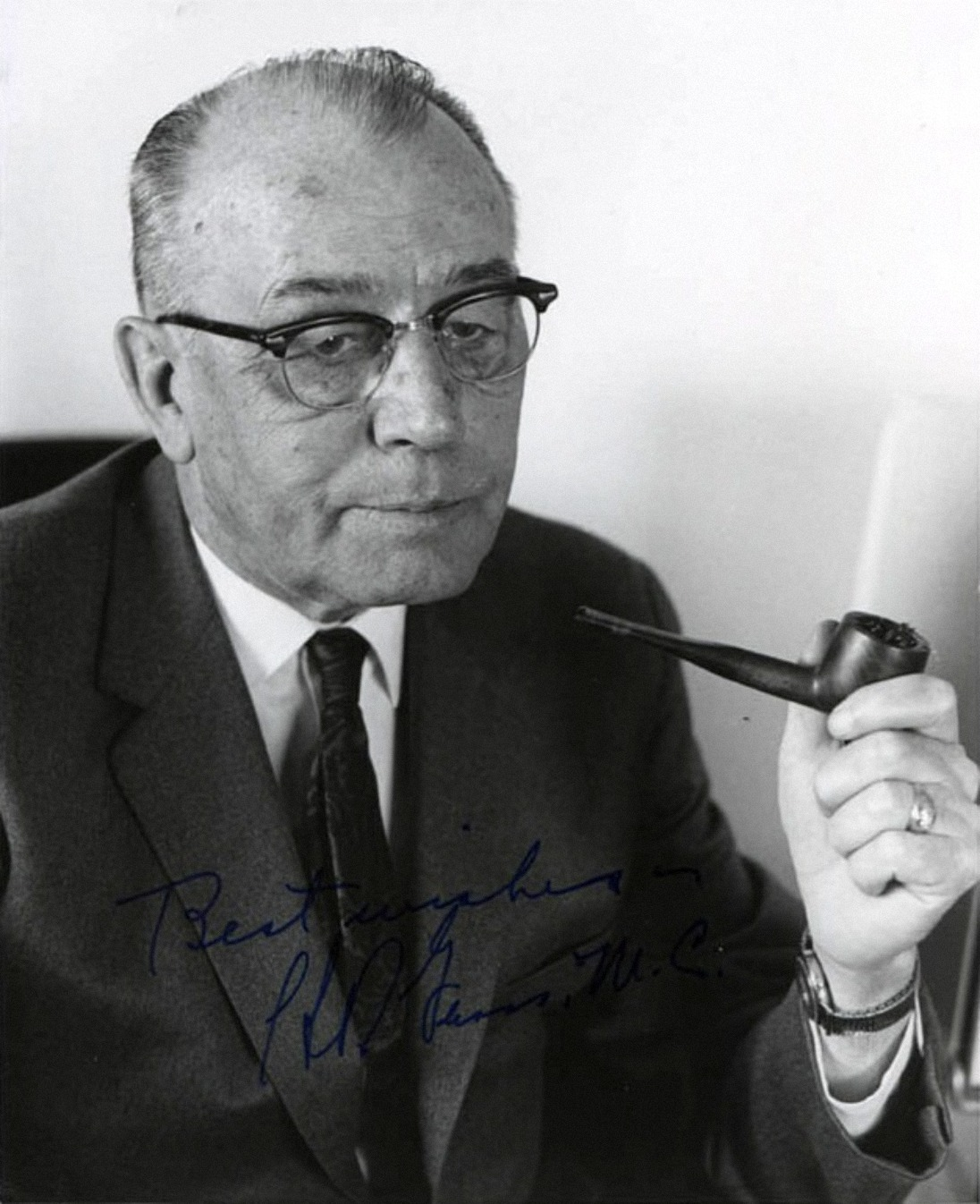
- Official portrait, c. 1969

Member of the U.S. House of Representatives from Iowa's 3rd district
- In office January 3, 1949 – January 3, 1975
- Preceded by: John W. Gwynne
- Succeeded by: Chuck Grassley

Personal details
- Born: Harold Royce Gross; June 30, 1899 Arispe, Iowa, US
- Died: September 22, 1987 (aged 88) Washington, D.C., US
- Resting place: Arlington National Cemetery
- Party: Republican
- Spouse: Hazel E. Webster
- Relations: Joe Gross (brother)
- Children: 2

Harold Royce Gross (June 30, 1899 – September 22, 1987) was a Republican United States representative from Iowa's 3rd congressional district for thirteen terms. The role he played on the House floor, objecting to spending measures and projects that he considered wasteful, prompted Time magazine to label him "the useful pest."

== Personal background ==
Gross was born on his parents' 240-acre (0.97 km^{2}) farm near Arispe, in Union County, Iowa. He was educated in the rural schools. In 1916, after completing his sophomore year in high school in Creston, Iowa, he concealed his youth in order to enlist in the military service, where he first served with the First Iowa Field Artillery in the Pancho Villa Expedition. During World War I he served in France with the United States Army from 1917–1919. After the war, he briefly attended Iowa State College in its electrical engineering program, before transferring to the University of Missouri School of Journalism in Columbia.

He was a newspaper reporter and editor for various newspapers from 1921 to 1935. One such newspaper was the publication of the Iowa Farmer's Union, the Iowa Union Farmer, which he edited from 1929 to 1935. He began as a radio news commentator for WHO in Des Moines, Iowa, in 1935. One of his fellow on-air broadcasters at WHO was a young Ronald Reagan.

He met Hazel Webster while he was a newspaper reporter covering the Iowa statehouse and she was the secretary to the Iowa Attorney General. They were married in 1929. H. R. and Hazel Gross raised two children, Phillip and Alan.

== 1940 run for Governor of Iowa ==
In 1940, Gross challenged Iowa's sitting Governor, George A. Wilson, in the Republican primary, running what newspapers called a "sight-unseen" campaign. Gross confined his campaign to radio addresses, declined all personal appearance invitations, and made no platform speeches. He lost the primary by only 15,781 votes out of over 330,000 cast, in the closest primary race in Iowa in nearly thirteen years. His campaign was haunted by a statement he had made seven years earlier, while writing and speaking for the Farmers' Holiday Association, that appeared to approve of an episode of mob violence against a judge to stop a foreclosure.

Following his defeat, Gross joined an Ohio radio station and later moved to Indiana. After World War II, he returned to Iowa and became a radio newscaster at KXEL in Waterloo.

== Congressional elections and re-elections ==
In 1948, Gross ran against an incumbent House member of his own party, Republican John W. Gwynne. He wrestled the nomination away from Gwynne in the Republican primary without the help of the party organization. In a 1948 general election in which Democratic President Harry S. Truman surprisingly carried Iowa and Iowa Democrat Guy Gillette ousted Republican George A. Wilson from the U.S. Senate, Gross won his first of many landslide victories. In his most narrow victory, he was the only Republican member of Iowa's U.S. House delegation to survive the 1964 Democratic landslide. He was re-elected twelve times before choosing to retire rather than run in the 1974 election. He served continuously from January 3, 1949 to January 3, 1975.

== Fiscal conservatism and independence ==
In the words of his successor, Charles Grassley, Gross earned "a legendary reputation as watchdog of the Treasury." He rarely missed a roll call vote and often remained in the House chamber between roll call votes, listening carefully to speeches and scrutinizing the details of pending bills, especially spending bills. He denounced, among other things, the Marshall Plan, the funeral of President John F. Kennedy (including the appropriation for fuel for the eternal flame), the size of the White House security detail, the Peace Corps, the U.S. Space Program, and foreign aid.

Gross also refused to go on taxpayer-funded congressional junkets. As Ed Rollins recalled, "When he retired, his fellow members chipped in and bought him and his wife Hazel, who managed his office for no pay, a round-the-world trip. With tears in his eyes he took one last shot at his pals. 'Wherever we go, I am sure I'll see you all on your taxpayers' junkets!'"

In the early 1960s he took an early stand against the practice of retired service personnel getting a military pension and another federal paycheck. He opposed restoring former President Dwight D. Eisenhower to his generalship unless Congress stipulated that he would only receive his Presidential pension and not a general's salary also. Gross admitted to having only one regret about his entire career: voting "present" rather than "nay" on the Gulf of Tonkin Resolution, explaining that the Vietnam War ended up costing too much.

Libertarian theorist Murray Rothbard hailed Gross in the Libertarian Forum, pointing out that the congressman had the best voting record from a libertarian standpoint. Before Gross' retirement from Congress, Rothbard had written "It is pleasant to take this opportunity to hail the Grand Old Man of the Old Right H. R. Gross of Iowa, a marvelous and flinty character almost out of the storybooks"

Gross was also known for his independence, so much so that then-House Minority Leader Gerald Ford remarked that "there are three parties in the House: Democrats, Republicans, and H.R. Gross." Shaking off the Eisenhower Administration's pressure to support a foreign-aid economic-development measure, Gross quipped, "I took my last marching orders in 1916–19."

Gross's personal lifestyle reflected his fiscally conservative views. He lived frugally and rarely attended any parties or social functions common to the life of a congressman. Gross was remembered as an outsider who preferred to sit in his townhouse and watch professional wrestling on TV.

In 1966, at the height of the Vietnam War, with many American soldiers dying, an extravagant White House ball ran on until 3 A.M. Disgusted by this callousness, Gross recited Alfred Noyes' poem The Victory Ball in Congress in protest; the poem condemns the hedonism of a British Armistice ball and contains the line "under the dancing feet are the graves".

He was also among the few who opposed the Uniform Monday Holiday Act in 1968, moving all federal holidays (other than Independence Day, Veterans Day, Christmas Day, and New Year's Day) to the nearest Monday. He argued that it would rob retail workers of their holidays because retail stores would remain open.

However, even his targets could speak warmly of Gross. Longtime House Armed Services Committee Chairman Carl Vinson, whose defense spending bills often incurred Gross's criticisms, said of Gross that "there is really no good debate unless the gentleman from Iowa is in it."

Gross voted in favor of the Civil Rights Acts of 1960 and 1968, as well as the 24th Amendment to the U.S. Constitution, but voted against the Civil Rights Acts of 1957 and 1964, as well as the Voting Rights Act of 1965. Despite his staunch fiscal conservatism, Gross was supportive of amendments for Social Security, the Celler-Kefauver Act, public housing, the Railroad Retirement Act, the Equal Rights Amendment of 1971 and the Oil Pollution Act of 1973.

== H.R. 144 ==
When Gross was in Congress, a special exception was made to the practice that bills offered in the House were numbered consecutively. The number H.R. 144 was reserved each session for one of Representative Gross's bills (because 144 equals one gross, making its title the arithmetical equivalent to his name).

== Death ==
Gross married Hazel E. Webster. They had two sons. He was a resident of Arlington, Virginia, until his death in a Washington, D.C. Veterans Hospital on September 22, 1987, due to complications from Alzheimer's disease. He was buried in Arlington National Cemetery.

U.S. House of Representatives
Preceded by John W. Gwynne	U.S. Congressman for the 3rd District of Iowa; 1949–1975	Succeeded by Chuck Grassley
