= Maurice Connolly =

American politician (1877–1921)

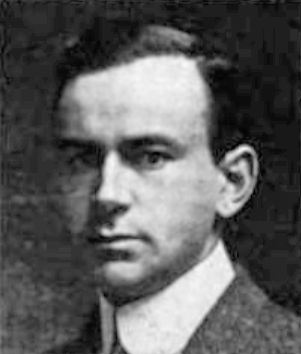
- Maurice Connolly, 1913

Member of the U.S. House of Representatives from Iowa's 3rd district
- In office March 4, 1913 – March 3, 1915
- Preceded by: Charles E. Pickett
- Succeeded by: Burton E. Sweet

Personal details
- Born: March 13, 1877 Dubuque, Iowa, U.S.
- Died: May 28, 1921 (aged 44) Indian Head, Maryland, U.S.
- Cause of death: Plane crash
- Resting place: Mount Olivet Cemetery, Key West, Iowa, U.S.
- Party: Democratic

Military service
- Allegiance: United States
- Branch/service: United States Army
- Rank: Major
- Battles/wars: World War I

Maurice Connolly (March 13, 1877 – May 28, 1921) was elected in 1912 to a single term as a Democratic member of the U.S. House of Representatives from Iowa's 3rd congressional district. After giving up his House seat in an unsuccessful bid for election to the U.S. Senate in 1914, Connolly then served as an aviation officer in World War I and died in a plane crash in 1921.

== Background ==
He was born in Dubuque, Iowa on March 13, 1877, as the son of a successful carriage maker, Tom Connolly, and his wife Ellen Brown Connolly. Connolly attended the common schools. He graduated from Cornell University, Ithaca, New York, in 1897, where he was a member of the Quill and Dagger society. In 1898, at age twenty-one, he graduated from the New York University School of Law, in New York City. He was admitted to the bar in 1899 and did postgraduate work at Balliol College, Oxford, England, and the University of Heidelberg, Germany. He returned to Dubuque when his father died suddenly in 1903, and assumed his ownership and management of the Connolly Carriage Company. Later, Connolly engaged in the insurance business and banking.

== Congress ==
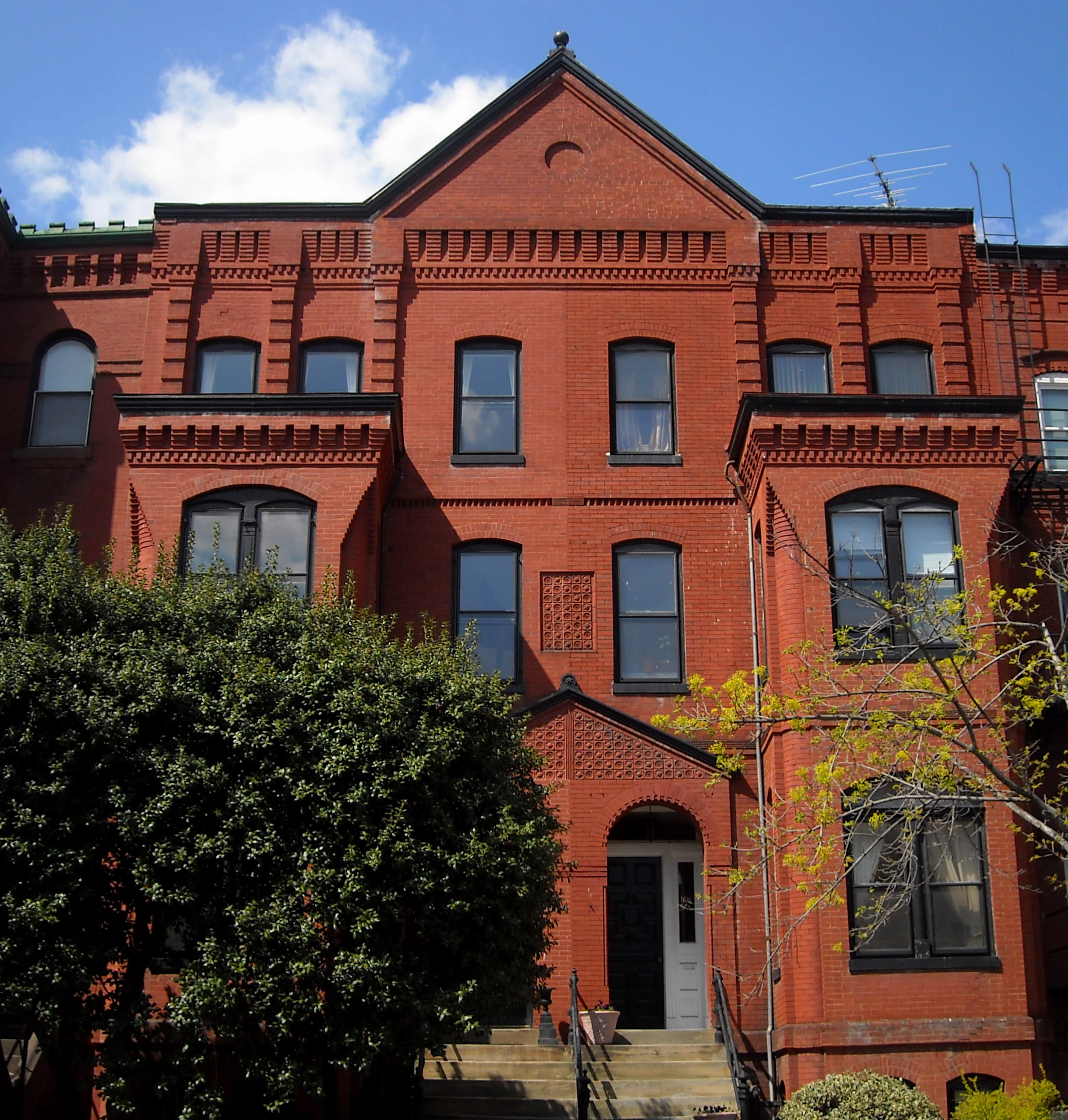
Connolly's home in Washington, D.C., while serving in Congress

Connolly ran as a Democrat for Congress in 1912, against incumbent Republican Charles E. Pickett. Connolly's hometown of Dubuque was a Democratic-leaning city at the edge of Iowa's strongly-Republican 3rd congressional district, which in Connolly's lifetime had elected only Republicans. Indeed, in every election since 1890, Republicans captured either all or all but one of Iowa's eleven seats in the U.S. House, while holding each seat in the Senate. When Iowa Republicans were divided between Theodore Roosevelt's Bull Moose Party candidacy and Republican Party nominee William Howard Taft, Connolly tied himself closely to Democratic presidential candidate Woodrow Wilson. Along with incumbent Democrat Irvin S. Pepper in Iowa's 2nd congressional district and Democrat Sanford Kirkpatrick in Iowa's 6th congressional district, Connolly was elected in 1912 to the Sixty-third Congress.

== Senate candidacy ==
In 1914 Iowans had their first opportunity to directly elect a U.S. Senator. Until the ratification of the Seventeenth Amendment to the United States Constitution in 1913, the U.S. Constitution had authorized only state legislatures to choose senators. In 1913, 37-year-old Congressman Pepper was the presumptive favorite to win the Democratic Senate nomination, to challenge incumbent Republican Senator Albert B. Cummins, but Pepper died unexpectedly in December 1913. Connolly ran in the Democratic primary for the nomination. He defeated Edwin T. Meredith in the primary, but was defeated by Senator Cummins in the general election.

Connolly was replaced in the House by Republican Burton E. Sweet, who had defeated Democrat J.C. Murtagh. In all, Connolly served in Congress from March 4, 1913 to March 3, 1915.

== Military service ==
After leaving Congress, Connolly returned to Dubuque to run his family's carriage company. He also became an executive of Dubuque Fire and Insurance Company. Connolly was an at-large delegate to the 1916 Democratic National Convention. President Wilson appointed him as postmaster of Dubuque.

After the United States entered World War I, Connolly enlisted, earning his flight wings and serving as captain, then major, in the Aviation Section, U.S. Signal Corps. He served as adjutant, executive officer and commanding officer at Chanute Field in Rantoul, Illinois, Wilbur Wright Field in Dayton, Ohio, and Hazelhurst Field in Mineola, New York. When the armistice was declared, he was assigned to Washington, where he assisted Major General William L. Kenly, first head of the United States Army Air Service. Connolly also flew in one of the "flying circuses" of fliers performing to raise funds for the Liberty Loan program.

Connolly and future New York City Mayor Fiorello H. La Guardia were the only former congressmen to earn their wings in World War I.

== Death ==
Following the war, Connolly became the Washington representative for the Curtiss Aeroplane and Motor Company. He was killed in an airplane accident near Indian Head, Maryland on May 28, 1921. He was one of two civilian passengers killed along with five air corps officers, including Medal of Honor recipient Lt. Col. Archie Miller, when their army Curtiss Eagle converted air ambulance crashed during a wind and electrical storm when returning to Washington D.C. At the time, it was considered the worst aviation accident in U.S. history.

== See also ==
- List of accidents and incidents involving military aircraft (pre-1925)

Party political offices
First	Democratic nominee for U.S. Senator from Iowa (Class 3); 1914	Succeeded by Claude R. Porter
U.S. House of Representatives
Preceded by Charles E. Pickett	Member of the U.S. House of Representatives from Iowa's 3rd congressional district 1913–1915	Succeeded by Burton E. Sweet
