= Iowa's 3rd congressional district =

U.S. House district for Iowa

Coordinates: 41°12′34″N 94°38′25″W

- Interactive map of district boundaries since January 3, 2023
- Representative: Zach Nunn; R–Bondurant
- Distribution: 73.07% urban; 26.93% rural
- Population (2025): 840,813
- Median household income: $82,393
- Ethnicity: 78.8% White; 8.1% Hispanic; 5.0% Black; 3.8% Asian; 3.6% Two or more races; 0.6% other
- Cook PVI: R+2

Iowa's 3rd congressional district is a congressional district in the U.S. state of Iowa that covers its southwestern quadrant, which roughly consists of an area stretching from Des Moines to the borders with Missouri.

From 2013 to 2023, the district covered the southwestern corner of the state, from the Des Moines metropolitan area on the northeastern end to the greater Council Bluffs area on the southwestern end.

The district has been represented in the United States House of Representatives by Republican Zach Nunn since 2023. With a Cook Partisan Voting Index rating of R+2, it is the least Republican leaning district of Iowa’s four congressional districts, a state currently represented in Congress only by Republicans. It is also the wealthiest congressional district in the state of Iowa.

== Recent election results from statewide races ==
Year	Office	Results
2008	President	Obama 53–45%
2012	President	Obama 53–47%
2016	President	Trump 48–45%
2016	Senate	Grassley 58–38%
2018	Governor	Hubbell 51–47%
2018	Secretary of State	Pate 49–48%
2018	Auditor	Sand 53–44%
2018	Treasurer	Fitzgerald 59–38%
2020	President	Trump 49.2–48.8%
2020	Senate	Ernst 49–48%
2022	Senate	Grassley 51–48%
2022	Governor	Reynolds 53–44%
2022	Secretary of State	Pate 56–44%
2022	Auditor	Sand 56–44%
2022	Treasurer	Fitzgerald 55–45%
2022	Attorney General	Miller 54–46%
2024	President	Trump 51–47%
2026	Senate	Turek 55–42%
2026	Governor	Sand 61–39%

== Composition ==
The 3rd districts includes the entirety of the following counties:

#	County	Seat	Population
1	Adair	Greenfield	7,389
3	Adams	Corning	3,544
7	Appanoose	Centerville	12,119
29	Cass	Atlantic	13,130
39	Clarke	Osceola	9,588
49	Dallas	Adel	111,092
51	Davis	Bloomfield	9,169
53	Decatur	Leon	7,665
73	Greene	Jefferson	8,584
77	Guthrie	Guthrie Center	10,722
117	Lucas	Chariton	8,747
121	Madison	Winterset	16,971
135	Monroe	Albia	7,504
137	Montgomery	Red Oak	10,139
145	Page	Clarinda	15,014
153	Polk	Des Moines	505,255
159	Ringgold	Mount Ayr	4,642
173	Taylor	Bedford	5,924
175	Union	Creston	11,906
179	Wapello	Ottumwa	35,166
185	Wayne	Corydon	6,557

== List of members representing the district ==
Representative	Party	Years	Cong ress	Electoral history	Location
District created March 4, 1863
William B. Allison (Dubuque)	Republican	March 4, 1863 – March 3, 1871	38th 39th 40th 41st	Elected in 1862. Re-elected in 1864. Re-elected in 1866. Re-elected in 1868. Retired to run for U.S. Senator.	1863–1873 [data missing]
William G. Donnan (Independence)	Republican	March 4, 1871 – March 3, 1875	42nd 43rd	Elected in 1870. Re-elected in 1872. Retired.	1863–1873 [data missing]
William G. Donnan (Independence)	Republican	March 4, 1871 – March 3, 1875	42nd 43rd	Elected in 1870. Re-elected in 1872. Retired.	1873–1883 [data missing]
Lucien L. Ainsworth (West Union)	Democratic	March 4, 1875 – March 3, 1877	44th	Elected in 1874. Retired.	1873–1883 [data missing]
Theodore W. Burdick (Decorah)	Republican	March 4, 1877 – March 3, 1879	45th	Elected in 1876. Retired.	1873–1883 [data missing]
Thomas Updegraff (McGregor)	Republican	March 4, 1879 – March 3, 1883	46th 47th	Elected in 1878. Re-elected in 1880. Redistricted to the 4th district and lost re-election there.	1873–1883 [data missing]
David B. Henderson (Dubuque)	Republican	March 4, 1883 – March 3, 1903	48th 49th 50th 51st 52nd 53rd 54th 55th 56th 57th	Elected in 1882. Re-elected in 1884. Re-elected in 1886. Re-elected in 1888. Re-elected in 1890. Re-elected in 1892. Re-elected in 1894. Re-elected in 1896. Re-elected in 1898. Re-elected in 1900. Renominated but withdrew prior to election.	1883–1887; Black Hawk, Bremer, Buchanan, Butler, Delaware, Dubuque, and Grundy counties
David B. Henderson (Dubuque)	Republican	March 4, 1883 – March 3, 1903	48th 49th 50th 51st 52nd 53rd 54th 55th 56th 57th	Elected in 1882. Re-elected in 1884. Re-elected in 1886. Re-elected in 1888. Re-elected in 1890. Re-elected in 1892. Re-elected in 1894. Re-elected in 1896. Re-elected in 1898. Re-elected in 1900. Renominated but withdrew prior to election.	1887–1933; Black Hawk, Bremer, Buchanan, Butler, Delaware, Dubuque, Franklin, Hardin, and Wright counties
Benjamin P. Birdsall (Clarion)	Republican	March 4, 1903 – March 3, 1909	58th 59th 60th	Elected in 1902. Re-elected in 1904. Re-elected in 1906. Retired.	1887–1933; Black Hawk, Bremer, Buchanan, Butler, Delaware, Dubuque, Franklin, Hardin, and Wright counties
Charles E. Pickett (Waterloo)	Republican	March 4, 1909 – March 3, 1913	61st 62nd	Elected in 1908. Re-elected in 1910. Lost re-election.	1887–1933; Black Hawk, Bremer, Buchanan, Butler, Delaware, Dubuque, Franklin, Hardin, and Wright counties
Maurice Connolly (Dubuque)	Democratic	March 4, 1913 – March 3, 1915	63rd	Elected in 1912. Retired to run for U.S. Senator.	1887–1933; Black Hawk, Bremer, Buchanan, Butler, Delaware, Dubuque, Franklin, Hardin, and Wright counties
Burton E. Sweet (Waverly)	Republican	March 4, 1915 – March 3, 1923	64th 65th 66th 67th	Elected in 1914. Re-elected in 1916. Re-elected in 1918. Re-elected in 1920. Retired to run for U.S. Senator.	1887–1933; Black Hawk, Bremer, Buchanan, Butler, Delaware, Dubuque, Franklin, Hardin, and Wright counties
Thomas J. B. Robinson (Hampton)	Republican	March 4, 1923 – March 3, 1933	68th 69th 70th 71st 72nd	Elected in 1922. Re-elected in 1924. Re-elected in 1926. Re-elected in 1928. Re-elected in 1930. Lost re-election.	1887–1933; Black Hawk, Bremer, Buchanan, Butler, Delaware, Dubuque, Franklin, Hardin, and Wright counties
Albert C. Willford (Waterloo)	Democratic	March 4, 1933 – January 3, 1935	73rd	Elected in 1932. Lost re-election.	1933–1943 [data missing]
John W. Gwynne (Waterloo)	Republican	January 3, 1935 – January 3, 1949	74th 75th 76th 77th 78th 79th 80th	Elected in 1934. Re-elected in 1936. Re-elected in 1938. Re-elected in 1940. Re-elected in 1942. Re-elected in 1944. Re-elected in 1946. Lost renomination.	1933–1943 [data missing]
John W. Gwynne (Waterloo)	Republican	January 3, 1935 – January 3, 1949	74th 75th 76th 77th 78th 79th 80th	Elected in 1934. Re-elected in 1936. Re-elected in 1938. Re-elected in 1940. Re-elected in 1942. Re-elected in 1944. Re-elected in 1946. Lost renomination.	1943–1963 [data missing]
Harold R. Gross (Waterloo)	Republican	January 3, 1949 – January 3, 1975	81st 82nd 83rd 84th 85th 86th 87th 88th 89th 90th 91st 92nd 93rd	Elected in 1948. Re-elected in 1950. Re-elected in 1952. Re-elected in 1954. Re-elected in 1956. Re-elected in 1958. Re-elected in 1960. Re-elected in 1962. Re-elected in 1964. Re-elected in 1966. Re-elected in 1968. Re-elected in 1970. Re-elected in 1972. Retired.	1943–1963 [data missing]
Harold R. Gross (Waterloo)	Republican	January 3, 1949 – January 3, 1975	81st 82nd 83rd 84th 85th 86th 87th 88th 89th 90th 91st 92nd 93rd	Elected in 1948. Re-elected in 1950. Re-elected in 1952. Re-elected in 1954. Re-elected in 1956. Re-elected in 1958. Re-elected in 1960. Re-elected in 1962. Re-elected in 1964. Re-elected in 1966. Re-elected in 1968. Re-elected in 1970. Re-elected in 1972. Retired.	1963–1973 [data missing]
Harold R. Gross (Waterloo)	Republican	January 3, 1949 – January 3, 1975	81st 82nd 83rd 84th 85th 86th 87th 88th 89th 90th 91st 92nd 93rd	Elected in 1948. Re-elected in 1950. Re-elected in 1952. Re-elected in 1954. Re-elected in 1956. Re-elected in 1958. Re-elected in 1960. Re-elected in 1962. Re-elected in 1964. Re-elected in 1966. Re-elected in 1968. Re-elected in 1970. Re-elected in 1972. Retired.	1973–1983 [data missing]
Chuck Grassley (New Hartford)	Republican	January 3, 1975 – January 3, 1981	94th 95th 96th	Elected in 1974. Re-elected in 1976. Re-elected in 1978. Retired to run for U.S. Senator.	1973–1983 [data missing]
T. Cooper Evans (Grundy Center)	Republican	January 3, 1981 – January 3, 1987	97th 98th 99th	Elected in 1980. Re-elected in 1982. Re-elected in 1984. Retired.	1973–1983 [data missing]
T. Cooper Evans (Grundy Center)	Republican	January 3, 1981 – January 3, 1987	97th 98th 99th	Elected in 1980. Re-elected in 1982. Re-elected in 1984. Retired.	1983–1993 [data missing]
David R. Nagle (Cedar Rapids)	Democratic	January 3, 1987 – January 3, 1993	100th 101st 102nd	Elected in 1986. Re-elected in 1988. Re-elected in 1990. Redistricted to the 2nd district and lost re-election.	1983–1993 [data missing]
Jim R. Lightfoot (Shenandoah)	Republican	January 3, 1993 – January 3, 1997	103rd 104th	Redistricted from the 5th district and re-elected in 1992. Re-elected in 1994. Retired to run for U.S. Senator.	1993–2003 [data missing]
Leonard Boswell (Des Moines)	Democratic	January 3, 1997 – January 3, 2013	105th 106th 107th 108th 109th 110th 111th 112th	Elected in 1996. Re-elected in 1998. Re-elected in 2000. Re-elected in 2002. Re-elected in 2004. Re-elected in 2006. Re-elected in 2008. Re-elected in 2010. Lost re-election.	1993–2003 [data missing]
Leonard Boswell (Des Moines)	Democratic	January 3, 1997 – January 3, 2013	105th 106th 107th 108th 109th 110th 111th 112th	Elected in 1996. Re-elected in 1998. Re-elected in 2000. Re-elected in 2002. Re-elected in 2004. Re-elected in 2006. Re-elected in 2008. Re-elected in 2010. Lost re-election.	2003–2013
Tom Latham (Clive)	Republican	January 3, 2013 – January 3, 2015	113th	Redistricted from the 4th district and re-elected in 2012. Retired.	2013–2023
David Young (Van Meter)	Republican	January 3, 2015 – January 3, 2019	114th 115th	Elected in 2014. Re-elected in 2016. Lost re-election.	2013–2023
Cindy Axne (West Des Moines)	Democratic	January 3, 2019 – January 3, 2023	116th 117th	Elected in 2018. Re-elected in 2020. Lost re-election.	2013–2023
Zach Nunn (Bondurant)	Republican	January 3, 2023 – present	118th 119th	Elected in 2022. Re-elected in 2024. Lost re-election.	2023–present:
Sarah Trone Garriott (West Des Moines)	Democratic	Assuming office on January 3, 2027		Elected in 2026.	2023–present:

== Recent election results ==
Year	Winner			Second			Percentage
Year	Party affiliation	Candidate	Votes	Party affiliation	Candidate	Votes	Percentage
1920	Republican	Burton E. Sweet	67,859	Farmer–Labor	Roy Jacobs	1,974	97–3%
1922	Republican	Thomas J. B. Robinson	34,518	Democratic	Fred P. Hageman	24,304	58–41%
1924	Republican	Thomas J. B. Robinson	54,921	Democratic	Willis N. Birdsall	25,215	69–31%
1926	Republican	Thomas J. B. Robinson	32,180	Democratic	Ellis E. Wilson	13,696	70–30%
1928	Republican	Thomas J. B. Robinson	60,025	Democratic	Leo. F. Tierney	38,469	61–39%
1930	Republican	Thomas J. B. Robinson	27,098	Democratic	W. L. Beecher	15,908	63–37%
1932	Democratic	Albert C. Willford	48,939	Republican	Thomas J. B. Robinson	47,776	51–49%
1934	Republican	John W. Gwynne	42,063	Democratic	Albert C. Willford	35,159	51–43%
1936	Republican	John W. Gwynne	53,928	Democratic	Albert C. Willford	47,391	52–46%
1938	Republican	John W. Gwynne	45,541	Democratic	W. F. Hayes	30,158	60–40%
1940	Republican	John W. Gwynne	65,425	Democratic	Ernest J. Seemann	43,709	60–40%
1942	Republican	John W. Gwynne	54,124	Democratic	William D. Kearney	35,065	61–39%
1944	Republican	John W. Gwynne	74,901	Democratic	William D. Kearney	56,985	58–42%
1946	Republican	John W. Gwynne	48,346	Democratic	Dan J. P. Ryan	29,661	62–38%
1948	Republican	H. R. Gross	78,838	Democratic	Dan J. P. Ryan	56,002	58–41%
1950	Republican	H. R. Gross	73,490	Democratic	James O. Babcock	40,786	64–36%
1952	Republican	H. R. Gross	109,992	Democratic	George R. Laub	56,871	66–34%
1954	Republican	H. R. Gross	68,307	Democratic	George R. Laub	41,622	62–38%
1956	Republican	H. R. Gross	97,590	Democratic	Michael Micich	69,076	59–41%
1958	Republican	H. R. Gross	61,920	Democratic	Michael Micich	53,467	54–46%
1960	Republican	H. R. Gross	99,046	Democratic	Edward J. Gallagher, Jr.	76,837	56–44%
1962	Republican	H. R. Gross	66,337	Democratic	Neel F. Hill	50,580	57–43%
1964	Republican	H. R. Gross	83,455	Democratic	Stephen M. Peterson	83,036	50.1–49.9%
1966	Republican	H. R. Gross	79,343	Democratic	L. A. Pat Touchae	48,530	62–38%
1968	Republican	H. R. Gross	101,839	Democratic	John E. Van Eschen	57,164	64–36%
1970	Republican	H. R. Gross	66,087	Democratic	Lyle D. Taylor	45,958	59–41%
1972	Republican	H. R. Gross	109,113	Democratic	Lyle D. Taylor	86,848	56–44%
1974	Republican	Chuck Grassley	77,468	Democratic	Stephen Rapp	74,859	51–49%
1976	Republican	Chuck Grassley	117,957	Democratic	Stephen Rapp	90,981	56–44%
1978	Republican	Chuck Grassley	103,659	Democratic	John Knudson	34,880	75–25%
1980	Republican	T. Cooper Evans	107,869	Democratic	Lynn G. Cutler	101,735	51–48%
1982	Republican	T. Cooper Evans	104,072	Democratic	Lynn G. Cutler	83,581	55–45%
1984	Republican	T. Cooper Evans	133,737	Democratic	Joe Johnston	86,574	61–39%
1986	Democratic	David R. Nagle	83,504	Republican	John McIntee	69,386	55–45%
1988	Democratic	David R. Nagle	129,204	Republican	Donald B. Redfern	74,682	63–37%
1990	Democratic	David R. Nagle	100,947	unopposed		833	99–1%
1992	Republican	Jim Ross Lightfoot	125,931	Democratic	Elaine Baxter	121,063	49–47%
1994	Republican	Jim Ross Lightfoot	111,862	Democratic	Elaine Baxter	79,310	58–41%
1996	Democratic	Leonard Boswell	115,914	Republican	Mike Mahaffey	111,895	49–48%
1998	Democratic	Leonard Boswell	107,947	Republican	Larry McKibben	78,063	57–41%
2000	Democratic	Leonard Boswell	156,327	Republican	Jay Marcus	83,810	63–34%
2002	Democratic	Leonard Boswell	115,367	Republican	Stan Thompson	97,285	53–45%
2004	Democratic	Leonard Boswell	168,007	Republican	Stan Thompson	136,099	55–45%
2006	Democratic	Leonard Boswell	114,689	Republican	Jeff Lamberti	103,182	52–47%
2008	Democratic	Leonard Boswell	175,423	Republican	Kim Schmett	131,524	56–42%
2010	Democratic	Leonard Boswell	122,147	Republican	Brad Zaun	111,925	50–46%
2012	Republican	Tom Latham	202,000	Democratic	Leonard Boswell	168,632	51–42%
2014	Republican	David Young	148,814	Democratic	Staci Appel	119,109	52–42%
2016	Republican	David Young	208,598	Democratic	Jim Mowrer	155,002	53–40%
2018	Democratic	Cindy Axne	169,888	Republican	David Young	164,667	49–47%
2020	Democratic	Cindy Axne	219,205	Republican	David Young	212,997	49–48%
2022	Republican	Zach Nunn	156,237	Democratic	Cindy Axne	154,084	50–49%
2024	Republican	Zach Nunn	213,747	Democratic	Lanon Baccam	197,965	51.8-47.9

=== 2002 ===
2002 Iowa's 3rd congressional district election
Party	Candidate	Votes	%
Democratic	Leonard Boswell*	115,367	53.41
Republican	Stan Thompson	97,285	45.04
Libertarian	Jeffrey J. Smith	2,689	1.25
Socialist Workers	Edwin B. Fruit	569	0.26
No party	Others	75	0.04
Total votes		215,985	100.00
Turnout			
Democratic hold			

=== 2004 ===
2004 Iowa's 3rd congressional district election
Party	Candidate	Votes	%
Democratic	Leonard Boswell*	168,007	55.21
Republican	Stan Thompson	136,009	44.72
No party	Others	213	0.07
Total votes		304,229	100.00
Turnout			
Democratic hold			

=== 2006 ===
2006 Iowa's 3rd congressional district election
Party	Candidate	Votes	%
Democratic	Leonard Boswell*	115,769	51.85
Republican	Jeff Lamberti	103,722	46.45
Socialist Workers	Helen Meyers	3,591	1.61
No party	Others	205	0.09
Total votes		223,287	100.00
Turnout			
Democratic hold			

=== 2008 ===
2008 Iowa's 3rd congressional district election
Party	Candidate	Votes	%
Democratic	Leonard Boswell*	176,904	56.31
Republican	Kim Schmett	132,136	42.06
Socialist Workers	Frank Forrestal	4,599	1.46
No party	Others	521	0.17
Total votes		314,160	100.00
Turnout			
Democratic hold			

=== 2010 ===
2010 Iowa's 3rd congressional district election
Party	Candidate	Votes	%
Democratic	Leonard Boswell*	122,147	50.73
Republican	Brad Zaun	111,925	46.49
Socialist Workers	Rebecca Williamson	6,258	2.60
No party	Others	426	0.18
Total votes		240,756	100.00
Turnout			
Democratic hold			

=== 2012 ===
2012 Iowa's 3rd congressional district election
Party	Candidate	Votes	%
Republican	Tom Latham*	202,000	50.56
Democratic	Leonard Boswell*	168,632	42.20
Independent	Scott G. Batcher	9,352	2.34
Socialist Workers	David Rosenfeld	6,286	1.57
No party	Others	572	0.14
Total votes		399,561	100.00
Turnout			
Republican gain from Democratic			

=== 2014 ===
2014 Iowa's 3rd congressional district election
Party	Candidate	Votes	%
Republican	David Young	148,814	52.8
Democratic	Staci Appel	119,109	42.2
Libertarian	Edward Wright	9,054	3.2
No party preference	Bryan Jack Holder	4,360	1.5
Write-ins		729	0.3
Total votes		282,066	100
Republican hold			

=== 2016 ===
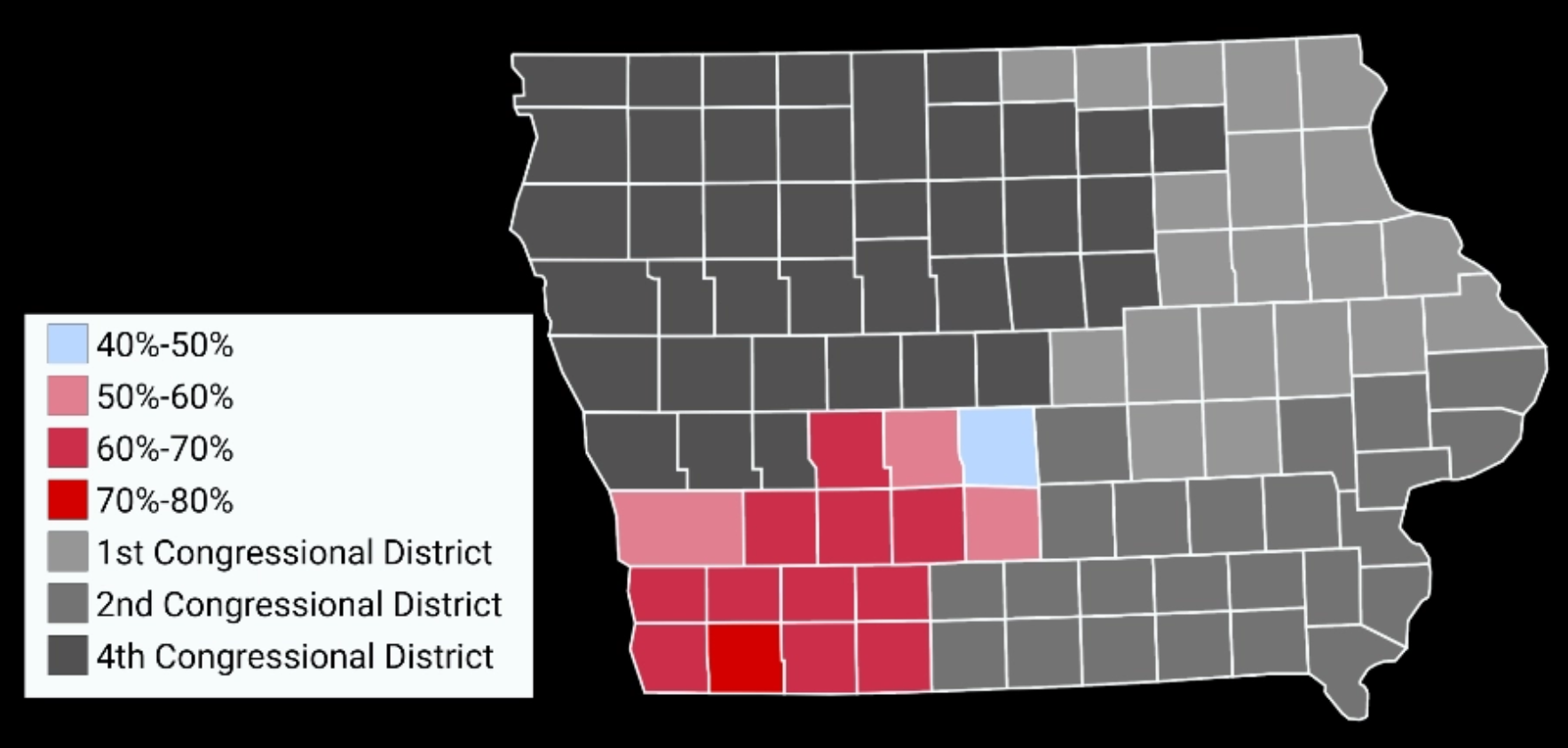
Map showing the results of the 2016 election in Iowa's 3rd congressional district by county

2016 Iowa's 3rd congressional district election
Party	Candidate	Votes	%
Republican	David Young*	208,598	53.45
Democratic	Jim Mowrer	155,002	39.71
Libertarian	Bryan Jack Holder	15,372	3.94
Nominated by Petition	Claudia Addy	6,348	1.63
Nominated by Petition	Joe Grandanette	4,518	1.16
	Write-ins	449	0.12
Total votes		390,287	100.00
Republican hold			

=== 2018 ===
Results of the 2018 Iowa's 3rd congressional district election

2018 Iowa's 3rd congressional district election
Party	Candidate	Votes	%	±%
Democratic	Cindy Axne	169,888	49.0	+9.29
Republican	David Young*	164,667	47.49	−5.96
Libertarian	Bryan Jack Holder	7,005	2.02	−1.92
Legal Marijuana Now	Mark Elworth, Jr.	1,906	0.55	+0.55
Green	Paul Knupp	1,795	0.52	+0.52
Independent	Joe Grandanette	1,271	0.37	−0.79
Write-ins		178	0.05	+0.00
Plurality		5,221	1.51	
Turnout		346,710	100	
Democratic gain from Republican		Swing	+15.25	

=== 2020 ===
Results of the 2020 Iowa's 3rd congressional district election

2020 Iowa's 3rd congressional district election
Party	Candidate	Votes	%
Democratic	Cindy Axne (incumbent)	219,205	48.9
Republican	David Young	212,997	47.6
Libertarian	Bryan Jack Holder	15,361	3.4
Write-in		384	0.1
Total votes		447,947	100.0
Democratic hold			

=== 2022 ===
2022 Iowa's 3rd congressional district election
Party	Candidate	Votes	%
Republican	Zach Nunn	156,237	50.3%
Democratic	Cindy Axne (incumbent)	154,084	49.6%
Write-in		534	0.2%
Total votes		310,855	100%
Republican gain from Democratic			

=== 2024 ===
2024 Iowa's 3rd congressional district election
Party	Candidate	Votes	%
Republican	Zach Nunn (incumbent)	213,747	51.8%
Democratic	Lanon Baccam	197,965	47.9%
Write-in		1,197	0.3%
Total votes		412,905	100%
Republican hold			

== See also ==
- Iowa's congressional districts
- List of United States congressional districts
- Redistricting in the United States

U.S. House of Representatives
Preceded by Maine's 1st congressional district	Home district of the speaker of the House; December 4, 1899 – March 4, 1903	Succeeded by Illinois's 18th congressional district
