= Records of the Past Exploration Society =

The Records of the Past Exploration Society was set up in 1900 by Reverend Henry Mason Baum in Washington, D.C. Membership was made up of academics with degrees, church leaders and professionals, especially those with an interest in archaeology. Baum was particularly interested in biblical archaeology but was also experienced in American antiquities.

The Society published a journal, entitled Records of the Past; the first edition was published in 1902. It continued to be published until 1914. Some of the main topics covered included anthropology, archaeology and history. The journal established a reputation for carrying high quality articles from a team of notable authors and, according to scholarly historian Hal Rothman, "acknowledged experts".
