= David B. Henderson =

American politician (1840-1906)

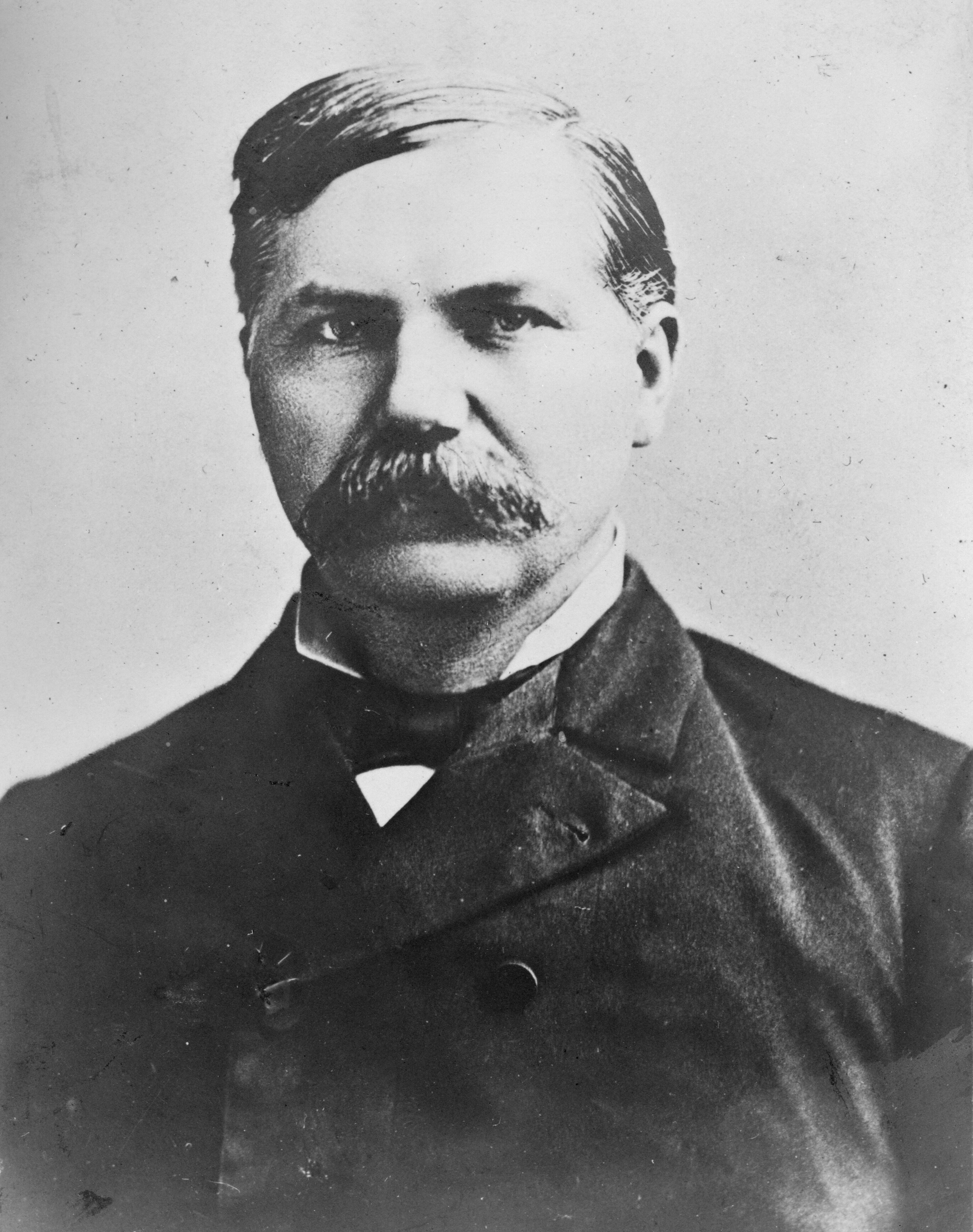
- Henderson in 1898

34th Speaker of the United States House of Representatives
- In office December 4, 1899 – March 3, 1903
- Preceded by: Thomas B. Reed
- Succeeded by: Joseph G. Cannon

Leader of the House Republican Conference
- In office December 4, 1899 – March 3, 1903
- Preceded by: Thomas Brackett Reed
- Succeeded by: Joseph Gurney Cannon

Member of the U.S. House of Representatives from Iowa's 3rd district
- In office March 4, 1883 – March 3, 1903
- Preceded by: Thomas Updegraff
- Succeeded by: Benjamin P. Birdsall

Personal details
- Born: Benjamin Bremner Henderson; March 14, 1840 Old Deer, Scotland
- Died: February 25, 1906 (aged 65) Dubuque, Iowa, United States
- Party: Republican
- Education: Upper Iowa University
- Profession: Law

Military service
- Branch/service: Union Army
- Rank: Colonel
- Unit: Company C, 12th Iowa Infantry Regiment; 46th Iowa Infantry Regiment
- Battles/wars: Civil War; Battle of Fort Donelson; Second Battle of Corinth

David Bremner Henderson (March 14, 1840 – February 25, 1906) was an American attorney, Civil War veteran and Republican Party politician who served as the 34th Speaker of the United States House of Representatives from 1899 to 1903. He represented Iowa in the House from 1883 to 1903. He was the first Speaker from west of the Mississippi River, the second foreign-born Speaker (after Charles Frederick Crisp), the only Speaker from Iowa, and the last Speaker who was a veteran of the Civil War.

Henderson was born in Old Deer, Scotland, in 1840 and immigrated to the United States with his parents in 1846. After settling in Winnebago County, Illinois, the family relocated to Clermont in Fayette County, Iowa in 1849. He enlisted in the Union Army during the American Civil War and was wounded at the Battle of Fort Donelson and Second Battle of Corinth. After he was mustered out in 1864, Henderson started a legal practice in Dubuque, Iowa in 1865. From 1869 to 1871, he was an Assistant United States Attorney for the Northern District of Iowa.

In 1882, Henderson was elected as a Republican to represent Iowa's 3rd congressional district in the United States House of Representatives. In 1889, he stood for Speaker of the House but finished behind Thomas Brackett Reed and William McKinley. From 1891 to 1895, he was the ranking Republican member of the powerful House Committee on Appropriations. When Republicans regained control of the House in the 1894 elections, Reed passed him over in favor of Joseph Gurney Cannon as committee chair, and Henderson was instead made chair of the House Committee on the Judiciary from 1895 to 1899. However, following Reed's resignation from the House in 1899, Henderson was elected to succeed him as Speaker. In 1902, Henderson abruptly abandoned his campaign for re-election to the House, and he was succeeded by Cannon as Speaker in 1903.

== Early life ==
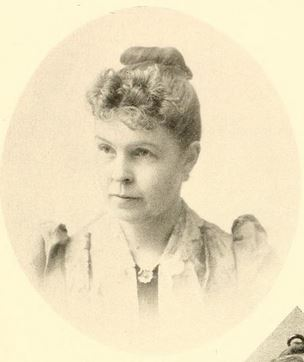
Augusta Fox

Henderson was born in Old Deer, Scotland on March 14, 1840. He immigrated to the United States with his parents, who settled in Winnebago County, Illinois in 1846. The family moved to a farm near Clermont, in Fayette County, Iowa in 1849. He attended the common schools, and the Upper Iowa University at Fayette, Iowa.

Henderson married Augusta Fox, a fellow student at Upper Iowa University. While pursuing the same course of study they formed a lifelong attachment. After finishing their studies, their paths diverged for a time. Fox returned to her home and Henderson entered the army as a private. He was severely wounded and lost a leg, but he returned to active service and accepted a colonelcy even before fully recovering. After the close of the war Colonel Henderson and Fox were married. Fox was a native of Ohio, but had moved to Iowa at an early age. They had two daughters and one son. The elder daughter married Samuel Peaslee, and the other daughter, Isabelle, was an accomplished musician.

== Civil War service ==
Henderson served in the Union Army during the Civil War and was wounded severely twice, once in the neck and later in the leg, which resulted in progressive amputations of that leg. He enlisted in the Union Army on September 15, 1861, as a private in Company C, 12th Iowa Volunteer Infantry Regiment. Henderson was elected and commissioned first lieutenant of that company. In the Battle of Fort Donelson, he was shot in the neck in the final charge over the breastworks. After returning to the Regiment in April 1862, he lost one foot and part of one leg at the Second Battle of Corinth in October 1862. He was discharged on February 26, 1863, due to his wounds, and returned to Iowa. After serving as commissioner of the board of enrollment of the third district of Iowa from May 1863 to June 1864, he re-entered the Army as colonel of the new 46th Iowa Volunteer Infantry Regiment, one of the "Hundred Days Men" regiments, and commanded the Regiment until it was mustered out in September 1864.

== Law practice ==
Henderson was a successful lawyer prior to pursuing his political career. After studying law, he was admitted to the bar in 1865 and commenced practice in Dubuque. He was the collector of internal revenue for the third district of Iowa from November 1865 to June 1869, when he resigned to accept a position as Assistant U.S. Attorney for the Northern District of Iowa, where he served until 1871. He was in private practice in Dubuque until 1882.

== Congressman and committee chair ==
In 1882, Henderson was elected as a Republican to represent Iowa's 3rd congressional district in the U.S. House, where he served from March 4, 1883, to March 3, 1903. He ran for Speaker of the House when the 51st Congress convened in 1889, finishing well behind Thomas Brackett Reed and runner-up William McKinley. He served as the chairman of the Committee on Militia in the 51st Congress, and chairman of the Committee on the Judiciary in the 54th and 55th congresses. He was also the ranking Republican on the House Committee on Appropriations during the 52nd and 53rd congresses, when the House had a Democratic majority. When Republicans regained the majority after the 1894 elections, Speaker Reed broke from tradition by returning the chairmanship to Joseph Gurney Cannon, who had served more nonconsecutive terms in the House and would have outranked Henderson had Cannon not lost his House seat for two years.

Henderson was an aggressive debater and an intense Republican partisan. He seems to have loved a fight; he got into enough of them from his very first term, exercising his power of personal vituperation and abuse against Democrats whenever he found grounds to do so. "I would rather spend an eternity in hell with a Confederate than an eternity in heaven with a northern Copperhead," he told one crowd. His secret for political success came from combining mainstream Republican causes with those dear to the hearts of his farmland constituency. In the summer of 1886, he led House forces in favor of levying a high tax on oleomargarine. At the same time he sponsored a bill to raise the benefits for veterans' widows by fifty percent. (On the final passage of another bill he favored, increasing the pensions of disabled veterans, Henderson withheld his vote, since he would stand among the beneficiaries). His commitment to pension legislation, general and individual, marked his whole career and took up most of his time.

== Speaker of the House ==
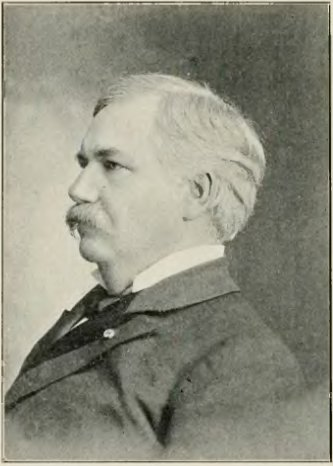
David B. Henderson

With the support of fellow "western state" Republicans, Henderson was elected to succeed Reed as Speaker following Reed's resignation from the post in 1899. During his two terms as speaker (in the 56th and 57th congresses), Henderson, by longstanding tradition also held the role as chairman of the Committee on Rules.

On September 16, 1902—with the next Congressional election less than two months away—Henderson surprised nearly everyone by announcing that he was withdrawing from the re-election campaign. Several explanations for his abrupt withdrawal were suggested. Henderson's letter announcing his decision referred to "a growing sentiment, among Republicans, that I do not truly represent their views on the tariff question." Some attributed his decision to the lingering effects of his war injuries.

In a letter to Henderson's successor Joe Cannon dated three days after Henderson's announcement, former House Clerk Henry H. Smith stated that "there can be but one explanation of the reason for his action [the resignation] . . . they relate not alone to poker playing, but to his alleged intimacy with a certain 'lobbyess' who is reported to have some written evidence that would greatly embarrass the Speaker. . . . He seemed to have lost all control of himself and become reckless. . . . This is not mere guesswork at all but private and reliable information which I am sure you will recognize when I tell you the name." - Whatever the cause, Henderson's resignation ushered in the beginning of Cannon's famous tenure as Speaker.

== Death and honors ==
After leaving Congress, Henderson practiced law in New York City until health problems caused him to retire to Southern California. Henderson died in Dubuque on February 25, 1906, aged 65. He is buried at Linwood Cemetery in Dubuque.

His portrait hangs in the speakers' room in the U.S. Capitol, and statues of Henderson by J. Massey Rhind are found in the collections of the Iowa State Historical Society and in Clermont.

Henderson is a namesake of Allison-Henderson Park, a city park in Dubuque, alongside six-term U.S. Senator William B. Allison, another citizen of Dubuque.

U.S. House of Representatives
Preceded by Thomas Updegraff	Member of the U.S. House of Representatives from Iowa's 3rd congressional district 1883–1903	Succeeded by Benjamin P. Birdsall
Preceded by Thomas B. Reed	Speaker of the U.S. House of Representatives; December 4, 1899 – March 4, 1901; December 2, 1901 – March 3, 1903	Succeeded by Joseph G. Cannon
