= 1914 United States Senate election in Iowa =

- November 2, 1914
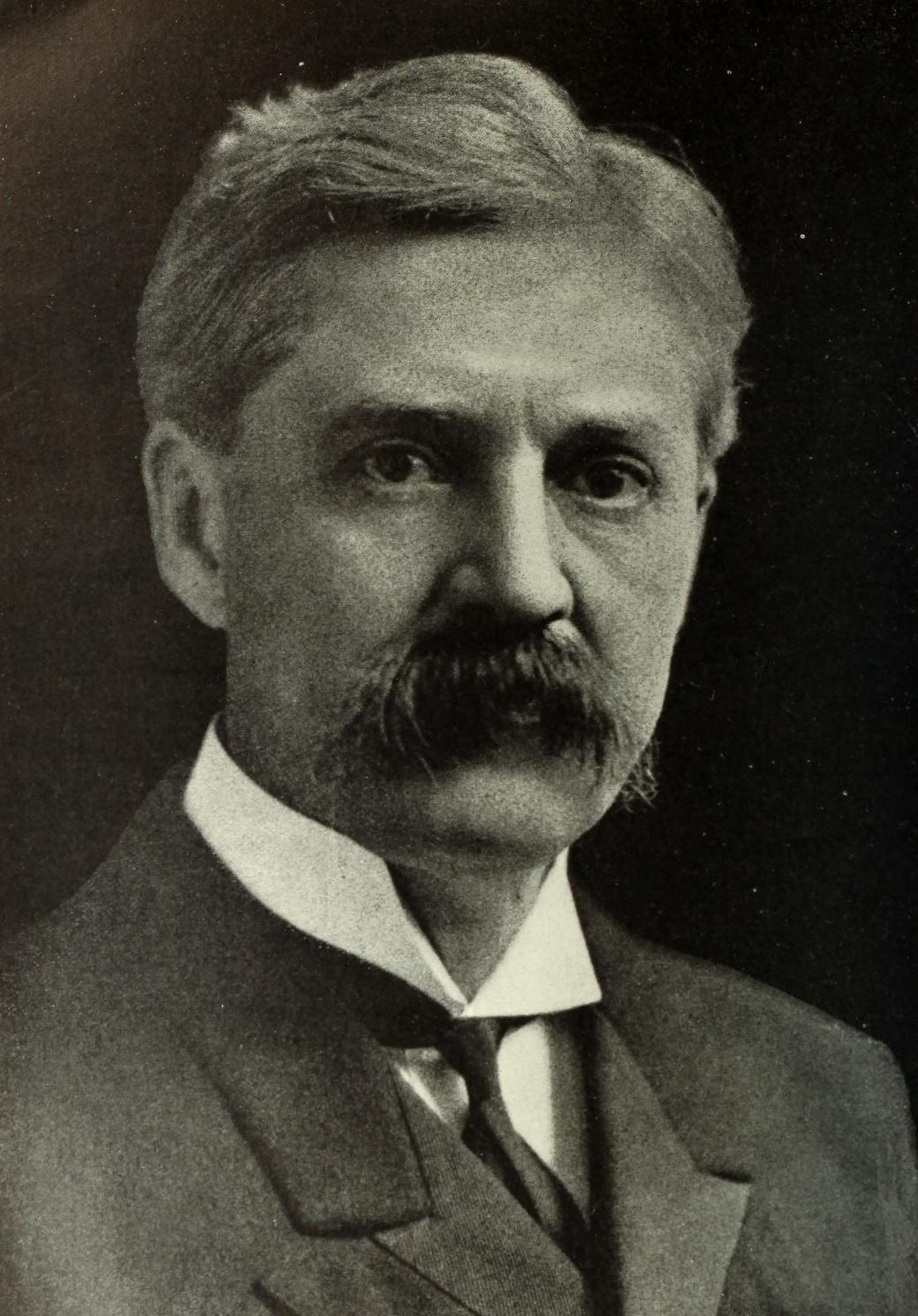

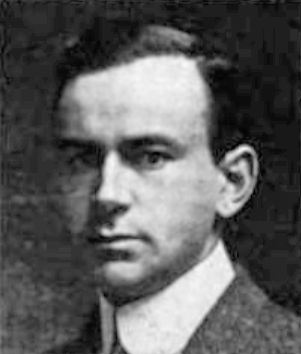

Nominee	Albert B. Cummins	Maurice Connolly	Otis Spurgeon
Party	Republican	Democratic	Independent
Popular vote	205,832	167,251	24,490
Percentage	48.19%	39.16%	5.73%
- County results Cummins: 30–40% 40–50% 50–60% 60–70% 70–80% Connolly: 30–40% 40–50% 50–60% 70–80%
U.S. senator before election
Albert B. Cummins
Republican
Elected U.S. senator
Albert B. Cummins
Republican

The 1914 United States Senate election in Iowa was held on November 3, 1914. Incumbent Senator Albert B. Cummins was re-elected to a second term in office, defeating Maurice Connolly and Otis Spurgeon.

== Republican primary ==
=== Candidates ===
- Albert B. Cummins, incumbent Senator since 1908
- Arthur C. Savage, State Senator from Adair

=== Results ===
1914 Republican U.S. Senate primary
Party	Candidate	Votes	%
Republican	Albert B. Cummins (inc.)	91,582	64.61%
Republican	Arthur C. Savage	50,125	35.37%
Write-in		29	0.02%
Total votes		141,736	100.00%

== Democratic primary ==
=== Candidates ===
- Maurice Connolly, U.S. Representative from Dubuque
- Edwin T. Meredith, farmer and publisher of Successful Farming

=== Results ===
1914 Republican U.S. Senate primary
Party	Candidate	Votes	%
Democratic	Maurice Connolly	43,726	55.35%
Democratic	Edwin T. Meredith	35,269	44.64%
Write-in		4	0.01%
Total votes		78,999	100.00%

== General election ==
=== Candidates ===
- M. L. Christian (Prohibition)
- Maurice Connolly, U.S. Representative from Dubuque (Democratic)
- Albert B. Cummins, incumbent Senator since 1908 (Republican)
- I. S. McCullis (Socialist)
- Casper Schenk (Progressive)
- Otis Spurgeon (Independent)

=== Results ===
1914 United States Senate election in Iowa
Party	Candidate	Votes	%
Republican	Albert B. Cummins (inc.)	205,832	48.19%
Democratic	Maurice Connolly	167,251	39.16%
Independent	Otis Spurgeon	24,490	5.73%
Progressive	Casper Schenk	15,058	3.53%
Socialist	I. S. McCullis	8,462	1.98%
Prohibition	M. L. Christian	6,009	1.41%
Total votes		427,102	100.00%
Republican hold			

== See also ==
- 1914 United States Senate elections
