= T. Cooper Evans =

American politician (1924–2005)

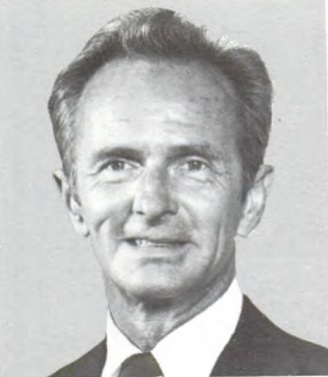

Member of the U.S. House of Representatives from Iowa's 3rd district
- In office January 3, 1981 – January 3, 1987
- Preceded by: Chuck Grassley
- Succeeded by: David R. Nagle

Member of the Iowa House of Representatives from the 38th district
- In office January 13, 1975 – 1979
- Preceded by: Harold O. Fischer
- Succeeded by: Robert H. Renken

Personal details
- Born: Thomas Cooper Evans; May 26, 1924 Cedar Rapids, Iowa, U.S.
- Died: December 22, 2005 (aged 81) Grundy Center, Iowa, U.S.
- Party: Republican
- Spouse: Jean Ruppelt
- Education: Iowa State College (B.S., M.S.)

Military service
- Allegiance: United States
- Branch/service: United States Army
- Years of service: 1943–1946; 1949–1965
- Rank: Lieutenant colonel

Thomas Cooper Evans (May 26, 1924 – December 22, 2005) was a three-term Republican U.S. Representative from Iowa's 3rd congressional district. First elected to Congress in a close race amidst a Republican landslide, in a district that became less Republican through reapportionment, Evans defied expectations by winning re-election by increasingly large margins.

Born in Cedar Rapids, Iowa, Evans graduated from Grundy Center High School, Grundy Center, Iowa in 1942. After graduating from high school, he enlisted in the United States Army, serving as infantryman from 1943 to 1946. After his discharge, he attended St. Andrews University in Scotland in 1948. He earned his B.S. from Iowa State College in Ames, Iowa in 1949 and earned his M.S. in 1955. He graduated from Oak Ridge School of Reactor Technology in Oak Ridge, Tennessee in 1956.

He also served as a lieutenant colonel in the Army Corps of Engineers from 1949 to 1965.

Evans served as president of Evans Farms, Inc. from 1965 to 1980 and served on the Grundy County Board of Property Tax Review from 1968 to 1974. He served in the Iowa House of Representatives from 1975 to 1979. He was a delegate to the Iowa State Republican conventions from 1966 to 1978.

In 1980, three-term Republican Congressman Charles Grassley gave up his seat in Iowa's 3rd congressional district to launch a successful run for the U.S. Senate against incumbent John C. Culver. Evans won a four-way race for the Republican nomination to succeed Grassley, winning 45 percent of the primary vote. In a general election in which Ronald Reagan and Grassley won landslide victories, Evans won a narrow victory in his historically Republican district, defeating Democrat Lynn Cutler by only four percentage points.

In Evans' first year in Congress, the Iowa Legislature was required to reapportion Iowa's congressional districts. The state's non-partisan Legislative Service Bureau produced two plans that were rejected by legislators, but its third plan removed six traditionally Republican counties from Evans' district while adding historically Democratic Johnson County, home of the University of Iowa. Pundits observed that the third plan, if adopted, "will probably make it much more difficult for Republicans to win in that district." An effort by Evans' supporters in the Legislature to amend the third plan to preserve its Republican character failed and it took effect upon the governor's signature.

In the 1982 general election, Evans again faced Cutler and was considered one of the most vulnerable freshman Republicans. However, despite redistricting and a minor national Democratic comeback, Evans handily defeated Cutler, winning this time by over 20,000 votes. Two years later, Evans won re-election by an even greater margin, receiving over 60 percent of the vote defeating Democrat Joe Johnston.

In January 1986, Evans announced he would not seek a fourth term, but would return to Iowa to farm. In all, he served from January 3, 1981 to January 3, 1987.

Evans died December 22, 2005, at the age of 81, in Grundy Center, Iowa, and was interred in Rose Hill Cemetery there.

U.S. House of Representatives
Preceded by Chuck Grassley	Member of the U.S. House of Representatives from Iowa's 3rd congressional district 1981–1987	Succeeded by David R. Nagle
