= David R. Nagle =

American politician and lawyer

David Nagle
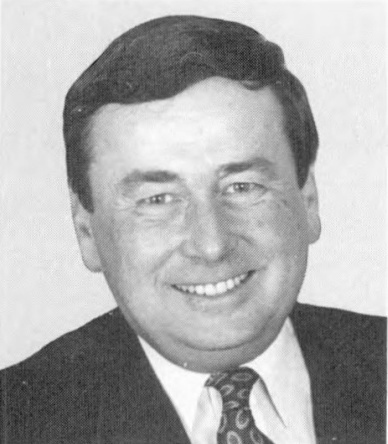

Member of the U.S. House of Representatives from Iowa's 3rd district
- In office January 3, 1987 – January 3, 1993
- Preceded by: Cooper Evans
- Succeeded by: Jim Nussle (redistricted)

Chair of the Iowa Democratic Party
- In office 1982–1985
- Preceded by: Edward Campbell
- Succeeded by: ???

Personal details
- Born: David Ray Nagle; April 15, 1943 (age 83) Grinnell, Iowa, U.S.
- Party: Democratic
- Spouse(s): Diane Norden (divorced) Debi Nagle
- Education: University of Northern Iowa (BA); University of Iowa (LLB)

David Ray Nagle (born April 15, 1943) is an American politician and lawyer from Iowa. He was a representative in the United States House of Representatives, representing Iowa's 3rd congressional district from 1987 to 1993. He is a member of the Democratic Party.

== Education ==
Nagle received his undergraduate degree from the University of Northern Iowa and his law degree from the University of Iowa.

== Career ==
Nagle served as an assistant county attorney for Black Hawk County, Iowa, from 1969 to 1970. He served as the city attorney of Evansdale, Iowa, from 1972 to 1973. From 1975 to 1980, he served as a member and later president of the Black Hawk County Conservation Board. He served as an adjunct professor at University of Northern Iowa from 1978 to 1981. From 1980 to 1983 he served on the Board of Governors of the Association of Trial Lawyers of Iowa. From 1982 to 1985 he served as Chairman of the Iowa Democratic Party.

Nagle first ran to represent Iowa's 3rd congressional district in 1986, to succeed retiring incumbent T. Cooper Evans, a Republican. Nagle won that election by a margin of 55%–45%, becoming the first Democrat to represent that district since 1935. He won reelection in 1988 by a wider margin, and ran unopposed in 1990.

Following the 1990 census, reapportionment reduced Iowa's representation from six seats down to five. The state's redistricting plan combined Nagle's district with Iowa's 2nd congressional district, which was represented by Republican Jim Nussle. Both incumbents ran in the combined district in 1992, and Nagle narrowly lost to Nussle by a margin of 50%–49%. He ran against Nussle again in 1994, losing again by a wider margin.

Nagle initially ran for the U.S. Senate in 1998, but withdrew after his arrest on a public intoxication charge.

In November 2001, he announced that he would again run against Jim Nussle, who was again being redistricted into the state's 1st congressional district. Nagle lost in the Democratic primary to Ann Hutchinson, mayor of Bettendorf, who lost to Nussle in the general election.

== Post-political career ==
He practices law in Waterloo, Iowa.

== Other activities ==
On August 5, 2011, he was inducted into the Iowa Democratic Party's Hall of Fame.

In February 2016, he was chosen by state Democratic Party chairwoman Andy McGuire to head a review panel which later examined the results of the 2016 state caucuses.

U.S. House of Representatives
Preceded by T. Cooper Evans	Member of the U.S. House of Representatives from Iowa's 3rd congressional district 1987–1993	Succeeded by Jim Lightfoot
U.S. order of precedence (ceremonial)
Preceded by Colin Allred as Former U.S. Representative	Order of precedence of the United States as Former U.S. Representative	Succeeded by Reid Ribble as Former U.S. Representative
