= Linwood Cemetery (Dubuque) =

Cemetery in Dubuque, Iowa

Coordinates: 42.524°N 90.665°W

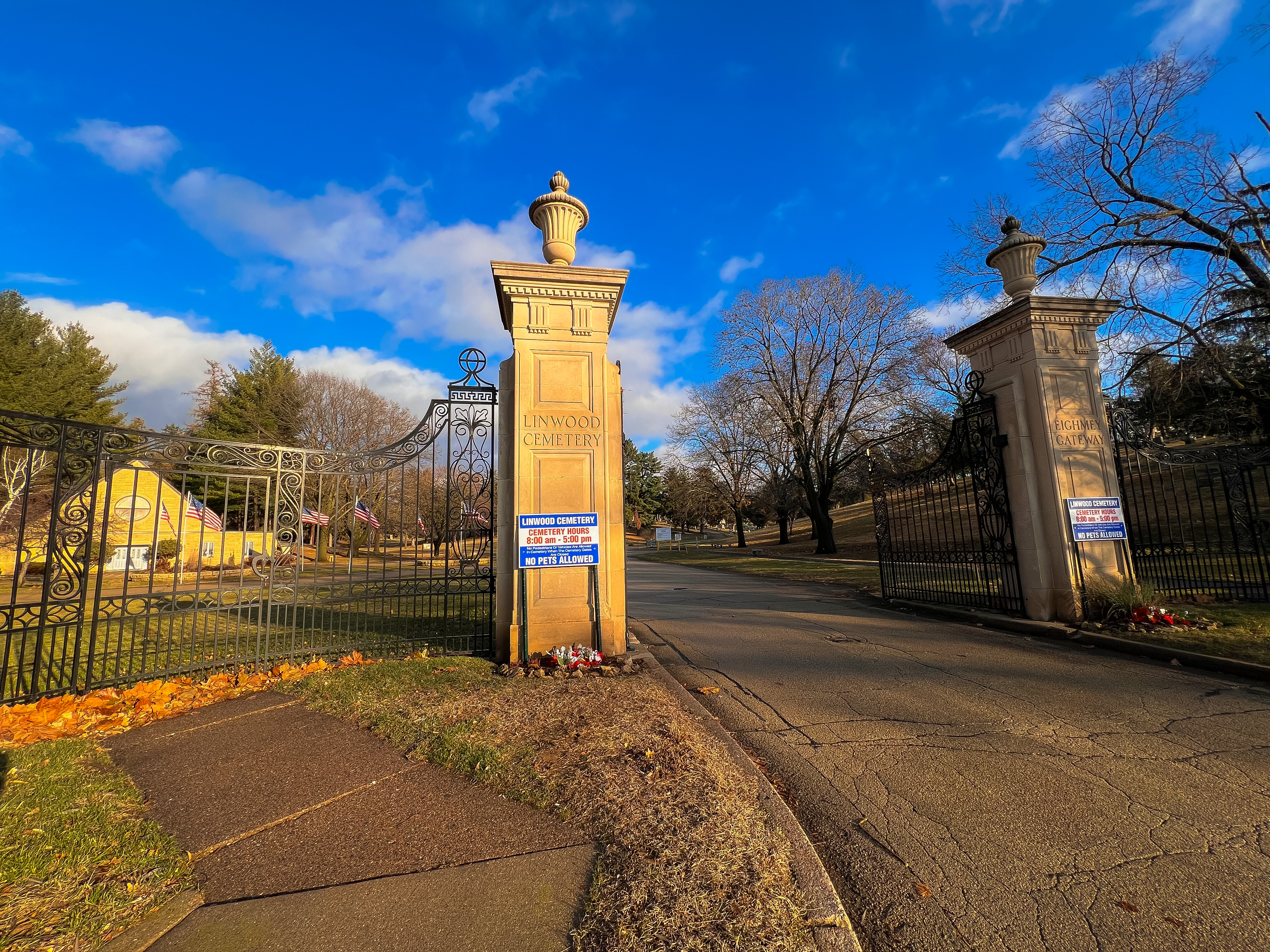
- Main gate
- Interactive map of Linwood Cemetery

Details
- Location: Windsor Ave, Dubuque, Iowa

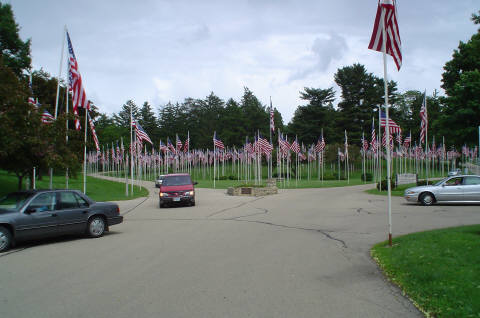
The cemetery on Memorial Day

Linwood Cemetery is located in Dubuque, Iowa, United States. It is located on Windsor Avenue in the north end of Dubuque.

== History ==
The cemetery is one of the main cemeteries in Dubuque. Originally established for the Protestants of the city, the cemetery now serves members of all faiths. If current burial procedures are followed in the future, the cemetery is estimated to have enough room for the next 1,200 years.

The cemetery is noted for the large gates at the entrance to the cemetery. The gates were given in memory of a local businessman and banker. It is also noted for the well cared for grounds, part of which sit on a bluff overlooking the Mississippi River.

== Notable burials ==
A number of notable people have been interred at Linwood Cemetery, including Iowa Governor Stephen P. Hempstead, for whom Hempstead High School is named, U.S. Senator William Boyd Allison, and former Speaker of the US House David Bremner Henderson.

Other notable local people buried at the cemetery include the author Eunice Gibbs Allyn, local tailor Rocco Buda, and former city councilman Donald Deich. Oran Pape — the first member of the Iowa State Patrol to have been murdered in the line of duty — is also buried at Linwood.

Major Stuart Anderson - a member of the U.S. Army Reserve who died in the January 7, 2006 UH-60 Black Hawk near Tal Afar, Iraq was also recently buried at Linwood. Len Kruse, a forty-year veteran of the US Postal Service turned local historian is also interred here. Len's writings appeared in numerous local publications, including the Telegraph Herald and Julien's Journal.

== Management ==
The cemetery is owned and operated by the Linwood Cemetery Association. They have operated the cemetery since 1875. Prior to that, the cemetery was owned by the city. However the city had not done a good job maintaining the cemetery, which resulted in the cemetery being in poor condition. This led to a number of citizens voting to turn over control to the Association.

Recently, the cemetery has built a mausoleum that also includes a number of columbarium niches. The cemetery plans to build several more similar mausoleums.
