= Charles E. Pickett =

American politician (1866–1930)

Charles Edgar Pickett
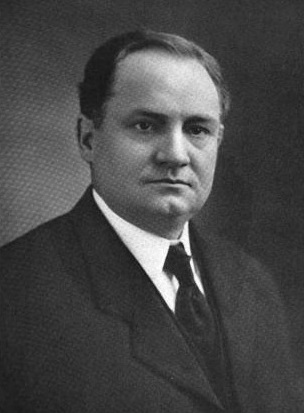
- From Volume II (1915) of History of Black Hawk County, Iowa, and Its People

Member of the U.S. House of Representatives from Iowa's 3rd district
- In office March 4, 1909 – March 3, 1913
- Preceded by: Benjamin P. Birdsall
- Succeeded by: Maurice Connolly

Personal details
- Born: January 14, 1866 Bonaparte, Iowa, U.S.
- Died: July 20, 1930 (aged 64) Waterloo, Iowa, U.S.
- Resting place: Elmwood Cemetery, Waterloo, Iowa, U.S.
- Party: Republican
- Education: University of Iowa College of Law

Charles Edgar Pickett (January 14, 1866 – July 20, 1930) was a two-term Republican U.S. Representative from Iowa's 3rd congressional district.

== Early years ==
Born near Bonaparte, Iowa, Pickett attended the common schools. He graduated from the University of Iowa at Iowa City in 1888 and from its College of Law in 1890. Pickett was admitted to the bar in 1890 and commenced practice in Waterloo, Iowa. He served as vice president of the Pioneer National Bank, and went on to serve as regent of the University of Iowa from 1896 to 1909.

He served as chairman of the Republican State Convention in 1899.

== Political career ==
In 1908, Pickett was elected as a Republican to represent Iowa's 3rd congressional district in the Sixty-first Congress. Two years later he was re-elected, leading to service in the Sixty-second Congress.

In 1912, when Republicans were divided between their own party's candidates and candidates of the Bull Moose Party, Pickett ran for re-election to a third term but was defeated by Democrat Maurice Connolly of Dubuque. In all, he served from March 4, 1909, to March 3, 1913.

After losing the election, he resumed the practice of law in Waterloo. He again served as chairman of the Republican State Convention in 1916 and served as delegate at large to the 1920 Republican National Convention.

In 1922, U.S. Senator William S. Kenyon of Iowa resigned to accept a judgeship, forcing a special election. Pickett was one of six Republicans who ran in the Republican primary for Kenyon's former Senate seat. Insurgent Smith W. Brookhart finished far ahead of Pickett and the others, by a great enough margin to avoid a convention fight.

Pickett died in Waterloo, on July 20, 1930. He was interred in Elmwood Cemetery in Waterloo.

U.S. House of Representatives
Preceded by Benjamin P. Birdsall	Member of the U.S. House of Representatives from Iowa's 3rd congressional district 1909–1913	Succeeded by Maurice Connolly
