= National Register of Historic Places listings in Cherokee County, Iowa =

Location of Cherokee County in Iowa

This is a list of the National Register of Historic Places listings in Cherokee County, Iowa.

This is intended to be a complete list of the properties on the National Register of Historic Places in Cherokee County, Iowa, United States. Latitude and longitude coordinates are provided for many National Register properties and districts; these locations may be seen together in a map.

There are 13 properties and districts listed on the National Register in the county, including one National Historic Landmark.

This National Park Service list is complete through NPS recent listings posted May 22, 2026.

== Current listings ==
	Name on the Register	Image	Date listed	Location	City or town	Description
1	Bastian Site	Bastian Site	July 19, 1976 (#76000742)	Address Restricted	Cherokee	
2	Lemuel C. and Mary (Vaughn) Boughton House	Lemuel C. and Mary (Vaughn) Boughton House	September 27, 2019 (#100004428)	736 W. Cedar St. 42°45′07″N 95°33′36″W	Cherokee	
3	Brewster Site		March 21, 1979 (#79000887)	Address Restricted	Cherokee	
4	Cherokee Commercial Historic District	Cherokee Commercial Historic District	August 24, 2005 (#05000903)	Parts of Main, Maple, and Willow between 1st and 6th Sts. 42°45′05″N 95°33′10″W	Cherokee	
5	Cherokee Public Library	Cherokee Public Library	April 9, 1985 (#85000773)	215 S. 2nd St. 42°44′55″N 95°33′04″W	Cherokee	
6	Cherokee Sewer Site		December 24, 1974 (#74000777)	River Rd. south of the Cherokee sewage treatment plant 42°43′22″N 95°34′25″W	Cherokee	
7	Guy M. and Rose (Freeman) Gillette House	Guy M. and Rose (Freeman) Gillette House	September 27, 2019 (#100004427)	111 N. 11th St. 42°45′02″N 95°33′53″W	Cherokee	
8	Illinois Central Railroad Yard-Cherokee	Illinois Central Railroad Yard-Cherokee	September 6, 1990 (#90001308)	Roughly bounded by S. 4th, 5th, W. Maple, and W. Beech Sts. 42°44′45″N 95°33′21″W	Cherokee	
9	Lewis Hotel	Lewis Hotel	September 15, 1997 (#97000963)	231 W. Main St. 42°44′58″N 95°33′09″W	Cherokee	
10	Mill Creek Bridge	Mill Creek Bridge	June 25, 1998 (#98000811)	Old Iowa Highway 21 over Mill Creek; 42°46′38″N 95°31′47″W	Cherokee	
11	Phipps Site		October 15, 1966 (#66000335)	Address Restricted	Cherokee	
12	Pilot Rock		May 29, 2026 (#100013062)	Address Restricted	Cherokee vicinity	
13	Roy C. and Lena (Johnson) Seaman House	Roy C. and Lena (Johnson) Seaman House	September 27, 2019 (#100004429)	400 Magnetic Ave. 42°45′12″N 95°32′40″W	Cherokee	

== See also ==
- List of National Historic Landmarks in Iowa
- National Register of Historic Places listings in Iowa
