= Illinois Central Railroad Depot =

Illinois Central Railroad Depot, and variations, may refer to:

== Illinois ==
- Amboy Illinois Central Depot, Amboy, Illinois, listed on the National Register of Historic Places (NRHP)
- Illinois Central Railroad Passenger Depot (Carbondale, Illinois), listed on the NRHP in Jackson County, Illinois
- Illinois Central Railroad and Toledo, Peoria, and Western Railroad Freight House, El Paso, Illinois, listed on the NRHP in Illinois
- Illinois Central Railroad Depot (Kankakee, Illinois), NRHP-listed
- Illinois Central Railroad Water Tower and Pump House, Kinmundy, Illinois, NRHP-listed
- Illinois Central Railroad Depot (Mattoon, Illinois), NRHP-listed
- Illinois Central Railroad Depot (Ullin, Illinois), NRHP-listed

== Indiana ==
- Illinois Central Railroad Freight Depot (Bloomington, Indiana), listed on the NRHP in Monroe County, Indiana

== Iowa ==
- Ackley Combination Depot, listed on the NRHP in Hardin County, Iowa
- Alta Depot
- Aurelia Depot
- Cherokee Depot and Yard, listed on the NRHP in Iowa
- Cleghorn Depot
- Denison Depot
- Gaza Depot
- George Depot
- Independence Depot
- Iowa Falls Depot
- Manchester Depot
- Meriden Depot
- Osage Depot
- Parkersburg Depot
- Pomeroy Depot
- Primghar Depot
- Rock Rapids Depot
- St. Ansgar Depot
- Sioux City Depot
- Storm Lake Passenger Depot, listed on the NRHP in Iowa
- Ticonic Depot
- Waverly Depot
- Webster City Depot
- Woodbine Depot

== Kentucky ==
- Illinois Central Railroad Station and Freight Depot (Bardwell, Kentucky), listed on the NRHP in Kentucky

== Minnesota ==
- Steen Depot

== Mississippi ==
- Illinois Central Railroad Depot (Brookhaven, Mississippi) Brookhaven, Mississippi
- Delta Blues Museum, former station in Clarksdale, Mississippi, listed on the NRHP in Mississippi, alternatively known as Illinois Central Passenger Depot
- Durant station, listed on the NRHP
- Illinois Central Depot (Grenada, Mississippi), listed on the NRHP in Grenada County, Mississippi
- Illinois Central Railroad Passenger Depot (Hazlehurst, Mississippi), listed on the NRHP in Copiah County, Mississippi
- Illinois Central Railroad Freight Depot (Natchez, Mississippi), a Mississippi Landmark
- Illinois Central Railroad Depot (Raymond, Mississippi), listed on the NRHP in Hinds County, Mississippi
- Illinois Central Railroad Depot (Terry, Mississippi), listed on the NRHP in Hinds County, Mississippi

== South Dakota ==
- Illinois Central Passenger Depot (Sioux Falls, South Dakota), listed on the NRHP in Minnehaha County, South Dakota

== Tennessee ==
- Illinois Central Railroad Division Office, Jackson, Tennessee, listed on the NRHP in Madison County, Tennessee
- Newbern Illinois Central Depot, Newbern, Tennessee, NRHP-listed

== Wisconsin ==
- Argyle Depot
- Basco Depot
- Belleville Depot
- Dodgeville Depot
- Madison Freighthouse
- Martintown Depot
- Monroe Freighthouse
