= Cherokee Commercial Historic District =

Historic district in Iowa, United States

- U.S. National Register of Historic Places
- U.S. Historic district
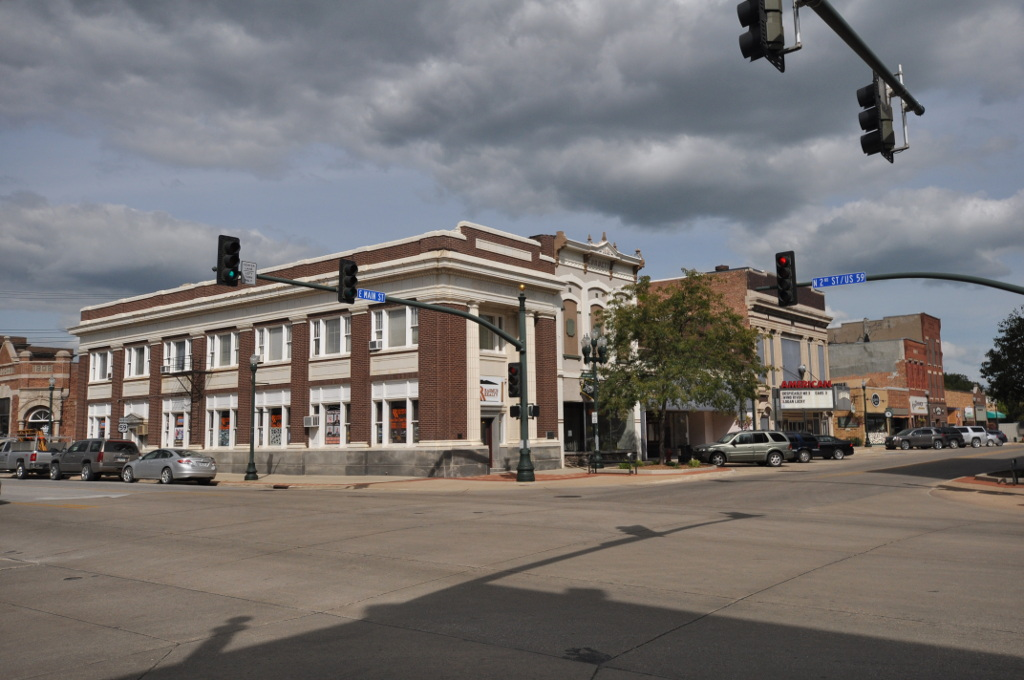

- Location within Iowa Location within the United States
- Location: Parts of Main, Maple, and Willow between 1st and 6th Sts. Cherokee, Iowa
- Coordinates: 42°44′58″N 95°33′04″W
- Area: 14.8 acres (6.0 ha)
- Architectural style: Late Victorian; Classical Revival
- NRHP reference No.: 05000903
- Added to NRHP: August 24, 2005

The Cherokee Commercial Historic District is a nationally recognized historic district located in Cherokee, Iowa, United States. It was listed on the National Register of Historic Places in 2005. At the time of its nomination it contained 70 resources, which included 50 contributing buildings and 20 non-contributing buildings. The historic district covers most of the city's central business district. Most of the buildings are two and three stories tall, and built of brick. There are two frame buildings from the city's earliest years. Cherokee is somewhat unusual in that it did not have a devastating fire in its history, therefore the downtown area was able to grow incrementally. Unlike many county seats, it does not have a focal point such as a centrally located courthouse square. The Cherokee County Courthouse was built on a hill to the west of the downtown area.

The district is almost completely made up of commercial buildings. Churches, residential, and civic buildings are either on the periphery or well outside of the downtown proper. The upper floors of the buildings generally house professional offices. Both the Illinois Central Railroad Depot (1896), and the Baggage Terminal (1896) are contributing properties. The period of significance is from 1867 to 1955, and the buildings are constructed during that time frame. The commercial Italianate, Romanesque Revival, Neoclassical, and Art Deco/Moderne Style are dominant. Prominent architects who have buildings in the district include Josselyn & Taylor (Lewis Hotel; 1899), Warren Wilfred Beach (Hawley Allison Block; c. 1910), and William Beuttler and Ralph Arnold (Sachse, Bunn & Company Block; 1920).
