= Belleville station =

Belleville station could refer to:

- Belleville station (MetroLink), a light rail station in St. Louis, Missouri, United States
- Belleville station (Illinois Central Railroad), a disused train station in Belleville, Wisconsin, United States
- Belleville station (Ontario), a railway station in Belleville, Ontario, Canada
- Belleville station (Paris Metro), a subway station in Paris, France
- Belleville station (Meurthe-et-Moselle) serves the town of Belleville, Meurthe-et-Moselle
