= Roger Goeb =

American composer (1914–1997)

Roger John Goeb (October 9, 1914 – January 3, 1997) was an American composer.

== Biography ==
Roger Goeb was born in Cherokee, Iowa. Although he had studied piano, trumpet, French horn, viola, violin, and woodwind instruments from an early age, he turned to the profession of music comparatively late. He studied agriculture at the University of Wisconsin (which twenty years later would be called University of Wisconsin–Madison), earning a BS degree in 1936. He then earned his living for two years playing in jazz bands before going to Paris to study composition at the Ecole Normale de Musique with Nadia Boulanger (1938–39). Returning to the United States he studied composition privately with Otto Luening, followed by graduate work, first at New York University, and then at the Cleveland Institute with Herbert Elwell, where he earned a Master of Music degree in 1942. Three years later, he gained a PhD at the University of Iowa with his Symphony No. 2 as a dissertation. After teaching stints at Bard College, the Juilliard School, Stanford University, and Adelphi College, he was awarded two successive Guggenheim fellowships in 1950–51 and 1951–52.

From the late 1940s until the mid-1960s, Goeb composed instrumental music prolifically, and his music was well received. His Third Symphony was premiered on October 28, 1952, by Leopold Stokowski and the CBS Orchestra, who recorded it two days later for RCA Victor. In 1964, however, he gave up composing for more than ten years, because of family illnesses. His wife and his son eventually both died from multiple sclerosis, after which he began composing again, composing 25 more works until a stroke in 1986 curtailed his activities. He died on January 3, 1997, at the Parker Jewish Geriatric Institute in Queens, NY.

== Style ==
His music economically projects clear lines and formal designs. He did not orchestrate, but rather composed directly for instruments. Though he used familiar pitch combinations, he was able always to make them sound fresh and novel.

== Compositions ==
=== Orchestra ===
==== Symphonies ====
- Symphony No. 1 (1941, withdrawn)
- Symphony No. 2 (1945)
- Symphony No. 3 (1952)
- Symphony No. 4 (1955)
- Symphony No. 5 (1981)
- Symphony No. 6 (1987)
- Sinfonia No. 1, for orchestra (1957)
- Sinfonia No. 2, for orchestra (1962)

==== Concerted works ====
- Concertant No. 1, for flute, oboe (or English horn, or clarinet), string orchestra or piano (1948)
- Concertant No. 2, for bassoon (or cello) and string orchestra (or string quartet) (1950)
- Concertant No. 3, for viola and wind orchestra (or wind ensemble or piano) (1951)
- Concertant No. 4, for clarinet, piano, percussion, and string orchestra (or clarinet and string quartet, or clarinet and piano) (1951)
- Concertant No. 5, for orchestra
- Concertino No. 1, for orchestra (1949)
- Concertino No. 2, for orchestra (1959)
- Concertino (Quintet) for trombone and strings (1952)
- Fantasy, for oboe and string orchestra (1952)
- Violin Concerto, (1953)
- Piano Concerto (1954)
- Fantasy, for piano and string orchestra (1955)
- Iowa Concerto, for chamber orchestra (1959)
- Black on White, for clarinet and string orchestra or string quartet (1985)

==== Other orchestral ====
- Prairie Songs, for small orchestra, or wind quintet (1947)
- Romanza, for string orchestra (1948)
- American Dances, Nos. 1–5 (1952)
- Encomium, for band (1958)
- Caprice, for orchestra (1982)
- Divertissement, for string orchestra (1982)
- Memorial, for orchestra (1982)
- Fantasia, for orchestra (1983)
- Essay, for orchestra (1984)
- Gambol, for orchestra (1984)

=== Chamber music ===
- String Quartet No. 1 (1943, withdrawn)
- String Trio (1944)
- String Quartet No. 2 (1948)
- Brass Septet (1949)
- Wind Quintet No. 1 (1949)
- Processionals (3), for organ, 2 trumpets, 3 trombones (1951)
- Divertimento, for cello and piano (1951)
- Suite, for flute, oboe (or trumpet, or clarinet), and clarinet (or flute) (1952)
- String Quartet No. 3 (1954)
- Piano Quintet (1955)
- Wind Quintet No. 2 (1955)
- Sonata, for violin and piano (1957)
- Running Colors, for string quartet (1961)
- Oboe Quartet (1961)
- Declarations, for flute, oboe, bassoon, horn, and cello (1961)
- Quintet, for cello and string quartet (1979)
- Brass Quintet No. 1 (1980)
- Octet, for clarinet, bassoon, horn, 2 violins, viola, cello, and double bass (1980)
- String Quartet No. 4 (1980)
- Wind Quintet No. 3 (1980)
- Wind Quintet No. 4 (1982)
- Flute Quintet (1983)
- Hurry, for flute, oboe, clarinet, horn, trumpet, vibraphone, viola, cello, and double bass (1985)
- Kinematic Trio, for viola, cello, and piano (1985)
- Nuances, for clarinet and viola (1986)
- Brass Quintet No. 2 (1987)
- Urbane Duets, for viola and cello (1988)
- Winds Playing, for 4 woodwinds and 6 brass (1988)
- Solar Pairing, Baroque flute and harpsichord (1989)

=== Solo instrument ===
- Fantasy, for piano (1948)
- Fuga contraria, for piano (1950)
- Imagery, for viola solo (1984)

=== Vocal ===
- Phrases from Blake, SSATB choir (1950)
- Etudes, for SATB choir and brass (1981)
- Vocalises (2), for soprano and chamber orchestra (1987)

== Discography ==
- American Dances (3 selections). Contemporary American Music for String Orchestra. (With David Diamond: Rounds, for string orchestra; Vincent Persichetti: Hollow Men, for trumpet and strings; Aaron Copland: Pieces, for string quartet (arr.); Quincy Porter: Music for Strings.) MGM String Ensemble, Izler Solomon, conductor; Sidney Baker, trumpet (Persichetti). LP recording 1 sound disc: 33⅓ rpm, mono; 12 in. [California]: MGM Records, [1952–1959?].
- Concertino for Trombone and String Orchestra. (With Frank Martin: Ballade for trombone and piano; Paul Hindemith: Sonata for trombone and piano.) Davis Shuman, trombone; WQXR Strings (Goeb); Leonid Hambro, piano (Martin and Hindemith). LP recording 1 sound disc: 33⅓ rpm, mono; 12 in. Golden Crest Recital Series. Golden Crest RE 7011. Huntington Station, NY: Golden Crest, 1962.
- Concertino No. 2 for orchestra. (With Gail Kubik: Symphony No. 2). Louisville Orchestra, Robert Whitney, cond. Louisville Orchestra first edition records; Louisville Orchestra commissioning series. LP recording, 1 sound disc: analog, 33⅓ rpm, mono. 12 in. LOU-58-5. Louisville, KY.: Louisville Orchestra, 1958.
- Divertimenti (2), for two flutes. New York Flute Club. A Tribute to Otto Luening. (With Otto Luening: Suite No. 2, for solo flute; Trio for three flutists; Three Canons for two flutes. John Heiss: Etudes for flute, op. 20; Harvey Sollberger: Killapata/Chaskapata; Ezra Laderman: June Twenty-ninth; Ulysses Kay: Suite for flute and oboe.) Compact disc 1 sound disc: digital; 4¾ in. CRI CD561. New York, N.Y.: CRI, 1988
- Prairie Songs (version for wind quintet). Three Contemporaries. (With Howard Swanson: Seven Songs; Ben Weber: Concert Aria after Solomon.) Five-Wind Ensemble; Helen Thigpen, soprano; David Allen, piano; Bethany Beardslee, soprano; unnamed orchestra, Frank Brieff, conductor. LP recording, 1 sound disc: 33⅓ rpm; 12 in. American Recording Society ARS-10. New York NY: American Recording Society, 1953. Reissued, Desto Records LP, 1 sound disc: 33⅓ rpm; 12 in. DST 6422. New York, N.Y.: Desto, 1967.
- Symphony no. 3 (With Béla Bartók: Sonata for Two Pianos and Percussion.) Leopold Stokowski, conductor, and his symphony orchestra (Goeb). Gerson Yessin and Raymond Viola, pianos; Elayne Jones and Alfred Howard, percussion (Bartók). LP recording. 1 sound disc: analog, 33⅓ rpm, mono; 12 in. RCA Victor LM 1727; Camden, N.J.: RCA Victor, 1953. Goeb Symphony reissued, coupled with Ben Weber: Symphony on Poems of William Blake. Warren Galjour, vocalist. LP recording 1 sound disc: analog, 33⅓ rpm, mono; 12 in. Composers Recordings, CRI 120. New York: Composers Recordings Inc., 1958. Goeb and Weber reissued together on CD, also coupled with Henry Cowell: Persian Set. Citadel: CTD 88123. Citadel, 1997.
- Symphony no. 4. (With Jacob Druckman: Dark upon the Harp.) Japan Philharmonic Symphony Orchestra, Akeo Watanabe, conductor (Goeb); Jan De Gaetani, mezzo-soprano, with instrumental ensemble (2 trumpets, horn, trombone, tuba, and 2 percussion players) (Druckman). LP recording. 1 sound disc: analog, 33⅓ rpm, mono; 12 in. Composers Recordings CRI-167. New York, N.Y.: Composers Recordings Inc., 1963. Goeb’s symphony reissued as part of American Symphonies. (With Homer Keller: Symphony No. 3; Elie Siegmeister: Symphony No. 3.) Japan Philharmonic Symphony Orchestra, William Strickland, conductor (Keller); Oslo Philharmonic Symphony Orchestra, Elie Siegmeister, conductor (Siegmeister). Compact disc 1 sound disc: digital; 4¾ in. Citadel CTD 88121. San Juan Capistrano, CA: Citadel, 1997.
- Quintet for Winds No. 1. New Art Wind Quintet. American Woodwind Symposium. (With Ingolf Dahl: Allegro and arioso; Vincent Persichetti: Pastoral for wind quintet, op. 21; Walter Piston: Pieces (3) for flute, clarinet, and bassoon; Henry Cowell: Suite for wind quintet; Wallingford Riegger: Quintet for Winds, op. 51; Elliott Carter: Quintet for Winds.) 2-LP set. 4 s.; 12 in.; 33⅓ rpm. Classic Editions: [1950–1959?]
- Quintet for Winds No. 2. (With William Sydeman: Movements, for woodwinds and strings, and Concerto da camera No. 1, for violin and chamber orchestra.) New Art Wind Quintet (Goeb); Max Pollikoff, violin; CRI Chamber Ensemble, Paul Wolfe, cond. (Sydeman). LP recording, 1 sound disc: analog, 33⅓ rpm, stereo.; 12 in. New York: Composers Recordings, 1962.

== Sources ==
- Barkin, Elaine. 2001. "Goeb, Roger (John)". The New Grove Dictionary of Music and Musicians, second edition, edited by Stanley Sadie and John Tyrrell. London: Macmillan Publishers.
- Cazden, Norman. 1952. "Reviews: Chamber Music". Notes second series, 10, no. 1 (December): 143–45.
- Dorian, Frederick. 1956. "Current Chronicle: Pittsburgh". Musical Quartertly 42, no. 3 (July): 394–96.
- Evett, Robert. 1954. "Roger Goeb: Fantasy for Oboe and String Orchestra". Notes, second series 11, no. 4 (September): 608.
- Kozinn, Allan. 1997. "Roger Goeb, 82, Who Composed For Orchestra and Taught Music". New York Times 146, no. 50,670 (January 12): 31.
- Malsky, Matthew. 2003. “Stretched from Manhattan’s Back Alley to MOMA: A Social History of Magnetic Tape and Recording”. In Music and Technoculture, edited by René T. A. Lysloff and Leslie C. Gay, 233–63. Music/Culture. Middletown, CT: Wesleyan University Press. ISBN 0-8195-6513-X (cloth); ISBN 0-8195-6514-8 (pbk).
- Stone, Kurt. 1964. "Reviews of Records". Musical Quarterly 50, no. 1 (January): 115–22.
