= Cherokee County Courthouse (Iowa) =

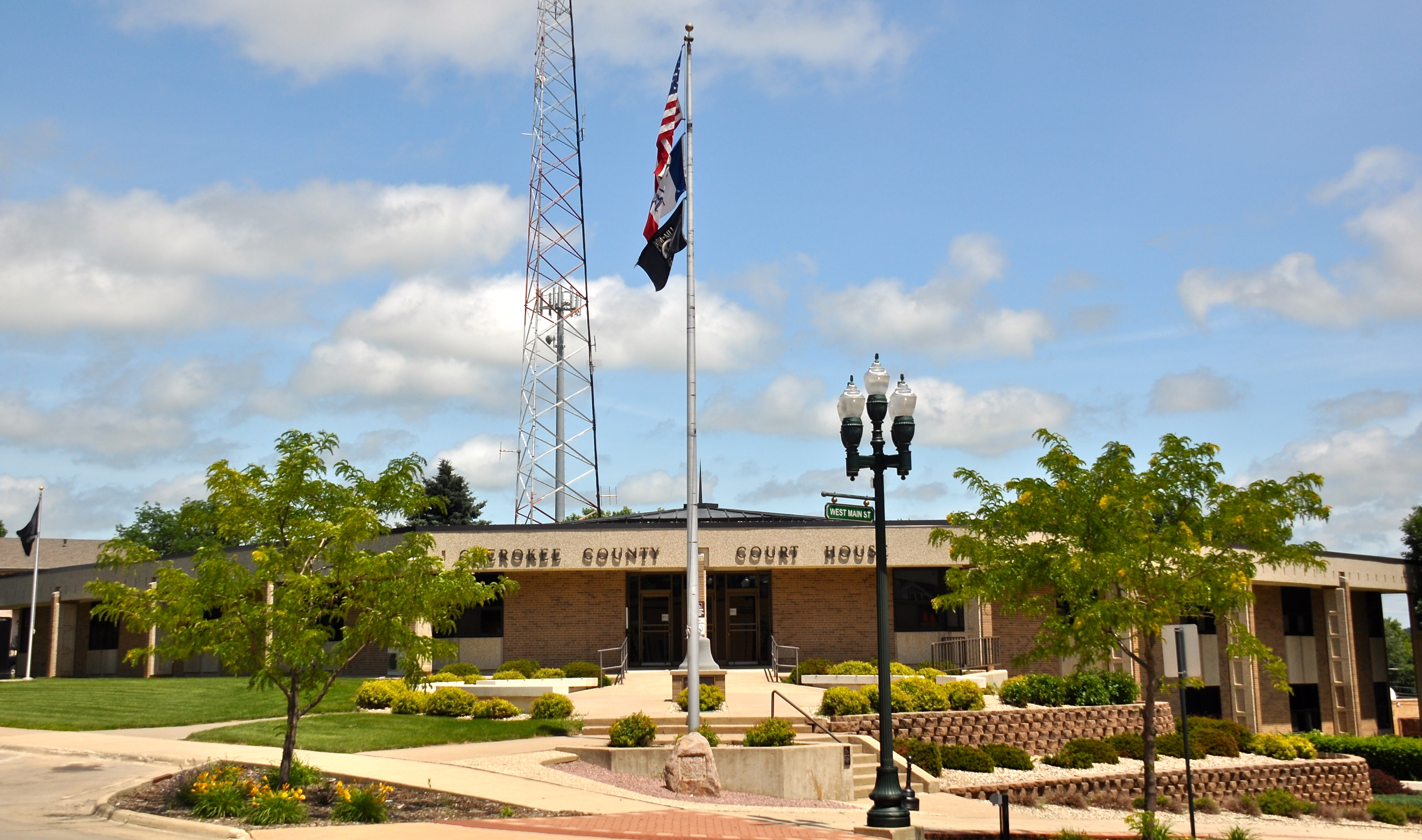
- Cherokee County Courthouse
- Interactive map of the Cherokee County Courthouse area

General information
- Type: Courthouse
- Architectural style: Modern
- Location: 520 W. Main St., Cherokee, Iowa, United States
- Coordinates: 42.750180°N 95.555959°W
- Completed: 1966

Technical details
- Floor count: Two

The Cherokee County Courthouse is located in Cherokee, Iowa, United States. The courthouse is the third structure to house court functions and county administration.

== History ==
A public multipurpose building was moved into the city of Cherokee in 1863. In addition to court functions, it also served as a public hall, schoolroom, and a general utility headquarters. Several attempts to replace the building failed until 1888 when voters agreed to build a combination courthouse and jail. Completed in 1891, the Romanesque Revival-style building featured rusticated limestone on the lower levels, brick on the upper levels, gables on the third story, and a corner clock tower. The present two-story Modernist brick structure replaced it in 1966. Cherokee County issued $475,00 in bonds for its construction. The building was constructed into the side of a slope so that both floors are visible from Main Street, while form North Sixth Street only the upper floor is visible.
