= Phipps Site =

- U.S. National Register of Historic Places
- U.S. National Historic Landmark
- Nearest city: Cherokee, Iowa
- NRHP reference No.: 66000335

Significant dates
- Added to NRHP: October 15, 1966
- Designated NHL: July 19, 1964

The Phipps Site (13CK21) is a Late Prehistoric Mill Creek culture archaeological site near Cherokee in Cherokee County, Iowa, United States. Its principal feature, a refuse midden, has yielded important information on the formation of middens in the region. The site was declared a National Historic Landmark in 1964.

== Description ==
The Phipps Site is located on the banks of Mill Creek in Cherokee County, occupying a broad terrace about 10 feet (3.0 m) above the typical water level of the creek. The principal feature of the site is a long and deep refuse midden, which, despite losses to plowing and erosion, still contained artifacts to a depth of more than 8 feet (2.4 m), indicative of a long period of use. Evidence of habitation has also been found in the form of depressions, a feature associated with earth lodges, semi-subterranean dwellings typical of the Mill Creek culture. Finds at the site include pottery fragments from both the Early and Late Little Sioux phases of the Mill Creek culture, and significant assemblages of the remains of raptors, suggesting some sort of ritual importance. The site also has artifacts attributed to the Middle Mississippian culture, evidence of a fairly long-range trading network.

The site underwent excavation in the 1930s, and again in 1952 under the auspices of Cherokee's Sanford Museum and the Iowa Archaeological Society. It was excavated by the University of Iowa in 1955 and 1956, and has since then been subject to further investigation. The site is subject to erosion, and was damaged during flooding in 1993.

== See also ==
- Earth sheltering
- Mound
- Mound builder (people)
- Earthwork (archaeology)
- List of National Historic Landmarks in Iowa
- National Register of Historic Places listings in Cherokee County, Iowa
