= Ben F. Laposky =

- Born: Benjamin Francis Laposky; September 14, 1914; Cherokee, Iowa, U.S.
- Died: 2000 (aged 85–86); Cherokee, Iowa, U.S.
- Occupations: Artist, mathematician
- Works: Electronic Abstractions
- Movement: Modern art, Abstract art, Personal, Experimental
- Awards: 1956 New York Art Directors Club gold medal for best editorial of the year (Fortune Magazine)

Benjamin Francis Laposky (1914–2000) was an American mathematician, artist and draftsman from Cherokee, Iowa. He has been credited with making the first computer graphics, utilizing an oscilloscope as the creation medium for abstract art. In 1953 he released what he called "Oscillons" (or oscillogram designs) along with a corresponding thesis entitled "Electronic Abstractions" via a gallery exhibition of fifty pictures of the same name at Sanford Museum in Cherokee. Laposky is often credited as the pioneer for electronic art, more specifically in the analog vector medium.

== Early life ==
He was born September 30, 1914, on a farm south of Cherokee to Peter Paul and Leona Anastasia (Gabriel) Laposky. His siblings were named George and Raymond. At age four, his family relocated to Colorado Springs, Colorado. In 1931, Laposky's mother died. In 1932, Laposky graduated from St. Mary's High School and shortly thereafter, the family returned to Cherokee, where he began working as a sign painter and draftsman.

== Career ==
=== Military service ===
Laposky joined the United States Army and was inducted into Fort Des Moines in 1942. He scored 134 in his army general classifications test, which placed him up in the upper five percent of what the army classified as "the ability to learn rapidly"; his mechanical aptitude test was 145. He was sent overseas with the 43rd Infantry division headquarters general staff section (G-3) assigned as a map draftsman (T-4).

As a technical sergeant, he was wounded in the right foot during a Japanese bombing raid at Rendona Island, Solomon Islands, (New Georgia Munda airfield campaign) in July 1943 (for which he received the Purple Heart). He spent 10 months in army hospitals in New Zealand and Alabama. He was discharged with disability in May 1944 after two years of service, returning to his home in Cherokee, Iowa.

=== Art ===
Laposky returned to his original work, but was no longer able to climb ladders as is required by a sign painter, so he focused on lettering smaller cards and draftsman and student of mathematics, providing many Magic Number Squares to the Ripley's Believe it or Not! syndicated newspaper feature. He owned a sign shop in Iowa and dabbled in art in his spare time. Envisioning "painting with light", he took extension courses in elementary drafting from the University of Chicago.

=== Electronic Abstractions ===
In 1946, Laposky began working with photographic pendulum tracings and harmonograph machine patterns.

In 1947, he read an article in Popular Science which proposed the use of television testing equipment, such as oscilloscopes, to generate simple decorative patterns, based on in formula similar to that which governs pendulum curves. This stoked his imagination and he began to investigate the proposal.

In 1950, Laposky used a cathode ray oscilloscope with sine wave generators and various other electrical and electronic circuits to create abstract art, so called by the artist, "electrical compositions". These electrical vibrations shown on the screen of the oscilloscope were then recorded using still photography. In later work he also incorporated motorized rotating filters of variable speed to color the patterns.

The color photos of the Oscillons were mostly made originally on Aero Ektachrome film, both 35mm and 4x5. This was used because it had good color density and contrast - also because it was less costly as surplus for some years. Exposures vary from 1/20 at f1.2 to f2, closeup at about 15 inches from scope screen. Cameras used were a Praktica and a Nikon. For the 4x5 work I used a B&J press with a German war surplus aerial lens, an f2 tessar if 120mmf.1. Most of the 35mm images were in motion in some or all of the traces (besides the electron beam motion itself). The 4x5 traces were taken at about 1/2 second, also at f2, and usually were static, the trace motion stopped by sync circuits in the oscilloscope. The black and white photos were made mostly on Linagraph film, a special high contrast film by Kodak for oscillograph photography. Some 4x5 work was done on Royal Pan and other fast films."

— Arts Magazine, "Ben F. Laposky: A Midwestern Pioneer of Absolute Light Form" June 1980

Scripta Mathematica published the first Oscillon photographs in 1952. Laposky's work was featured in over 250 books, magazines, newspapers, advertising art work worldwide. An art portfolio in Fortune magazine in 1956 won a New York Art Directors Club gold medal for best editorial of the year.

Laposky was interested in showing the designs or patterns based on natural forms, curves due to physical forces, or curves based on mathematical principles, such as various waveforms (sine waves, square waves and Lissajous figures). According to the exhibit documentation, Laposky pointed out a parallel between his oscillons and music, the operator of an electronic setup playing a sort of "visual music".

In 1952 Laposky displayed his work in a one-man show entitled "Electronic Abstractions" at Sanford Museum in Cherokee, Iowa. As a traveling exhibit, "Electronic Abstractions" was shown across the United States and in France at LeMons and other places by the Cultural Relations Section of the United States from 1952 to 1961.

Electronic Abstractions are a new kind of abstract art. They are beautiful design compositions formed by the combination of electrical wave forms as displayed on a cathode-ray oscilloscope. The exhibit consists of 50 photographs of these patterns . A wide variety of shapes and textures is included. The patterns all have an abstract quality, yet retain a geometrical precision . They are related to various mathematical curves, the intricate tracings of the geometric lathes and pendulum patterns, but show possibilities far beyond these sources of design."

— Sanford Museum, Gallery notes for Electronic Abstractions, 1952

In total, Laposky's art was published more than 160 times and displayed at more than 200 exhibitions before the emergence of computer graphics upstaged him in the mid 1960s.

Laposky cited and admired Naum Gabo, Joan Miró, Piet Mondrian, Victor Vasarely, Kazimir Malevich, Fernand Léger, Marcel Duchamp, Alexander Calder and some of the Synchromism and Futurism artists.

Some praise of the Oscillon work by Laposky: "The Oscillons are among the most sensually and spiritually exhilarating images of the entire history of human vision,". "The rhythm and balance in each piece reflect not only the artist’s vision but the ordered principles underlying the physical world." Fred Camper, The Chicago Reader, August 2006

=== Magic Squares ===
From 1934 through August 1946, Ripley's Believe It or Not! had printed 77 of Laposky's Magic Square number problems. In total 117 of Laposky's geometric number arrangements ("magics") were printed in the Believe it or Not newspaper feature. Laposky's work on these number matrices lead to his election for membership in the Mathematical Association of America in 1950.

Laposky wrote about his magic square: "The crystallization in numbers of some small part of the beauty, harmony and rhythm or the universe.". It is likely that Laposky's early work in these Magic Squares and deeper introspection into their inner workings had profound influence on his latter work on Oscillons.

== Legacy ==
Ben Laposky died in 2000 in Cherokee. His original one-man show of black and white Oscillons, along with 52 additional color images, is curated and controlled by the Sanford Museum and Planetarium in Cherokee, Iowa. The museum's collection contains various commercial works and books in which Laposky was mentioned.

None of the 10,000 negatives he claimed to have taken have ever been found, and only 101 mounted images of the original set of 102 remain.

The original traveling show, along with some additional works, is maintained and periodically shown by the Sanford Museum and often travels to museums and universities internationally.
