= Brewster site =

Archaeological site in Iowa, US

- Brewster Site
- U.S. National Register of Historic Places
- Nearest city: Cherokee, Iowa
- NRHP reference No.: 79000887
- Added to NRHP: March 21, 1979

The Brewster Site is an archaeological site associated with a village of the Mill Creek culture near Cherokee, Iowa, United States. Among the items found here are ceremonial or decorative items manufactured from birds. Pottery that has been tempered with crushed granite, sand, and pulverized clamshell has also been found. The site was listed on the National Register of Historic Places in 1979.
