= Mill Creek Bridge (Cherokee, Iowa) =

- U.S. National Register of Historic Places
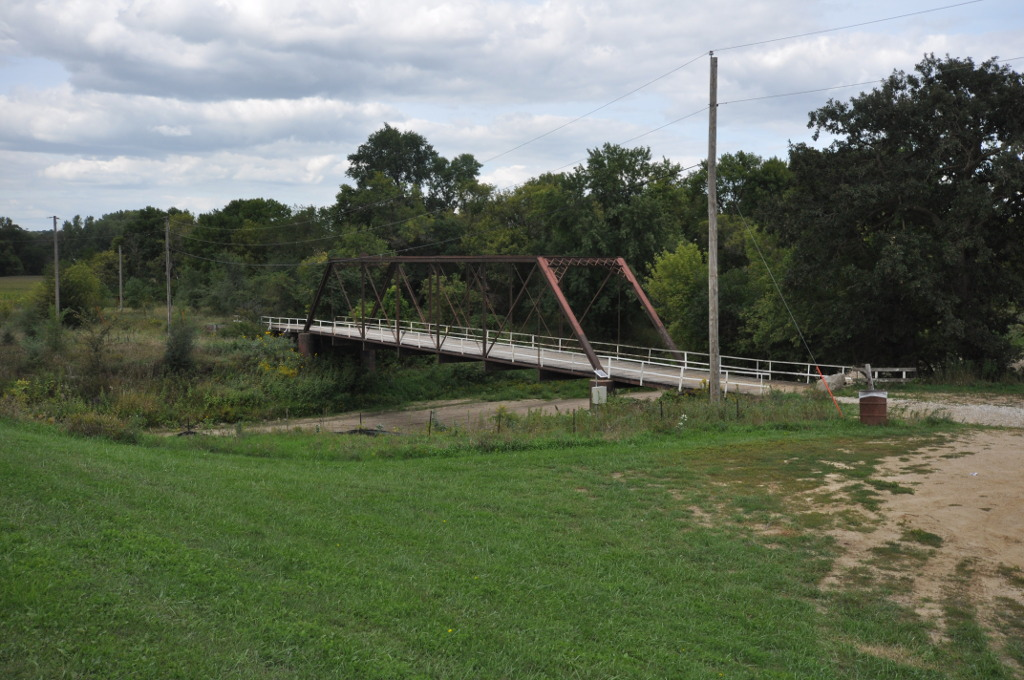

- Location within Iowa Location within the United States
- Location: adjacent to Old Iowa Highway 21 over Mill Creek
- Nearest city: Cherokee, Iowa
- Coordinates: 42°46′38″N 95°31′47″W
- Area: less than one acre
- Built: 1891
- Built by: George E. King Bridge Co.
- Architect: King Bridge Company
- Architectural style: Pratt truss
- MPS: Highway Bridges of Iowa MPS
- NRHP reference No.: 98000811
- Added to NRHP: June 25, 1998

The Mill Creek Bridge is located north of Cherokee, Iowa, United States. It spans Mill Creek for 207 feet (63 m). On June 24, 1891, a disastrous flood along the Little Sioux River and its tributaries wiped out nearly every bridge in Cherokee County. The following month the county board of supervisors signed a contract with the George E. King Bridge Co. of Des Moines for 17,650 to replace the bridges. This Pratt truss bridge was fabricated by the King Bridge Company of Cleveland, Ohio. It and a similar span over Mill Creek near Larrabee are the only two that remain. This bridge was listed on the National Register of Historic Places in 1998. A modern concrete span, built just upstream in 2006, now carries the road. The old bridge is closed to vehicular traffic.
