= Guy M. and Rose (Freeman) Gillette House =

Historic house in Iowa, United States

- U.S. National Register of Historic Places
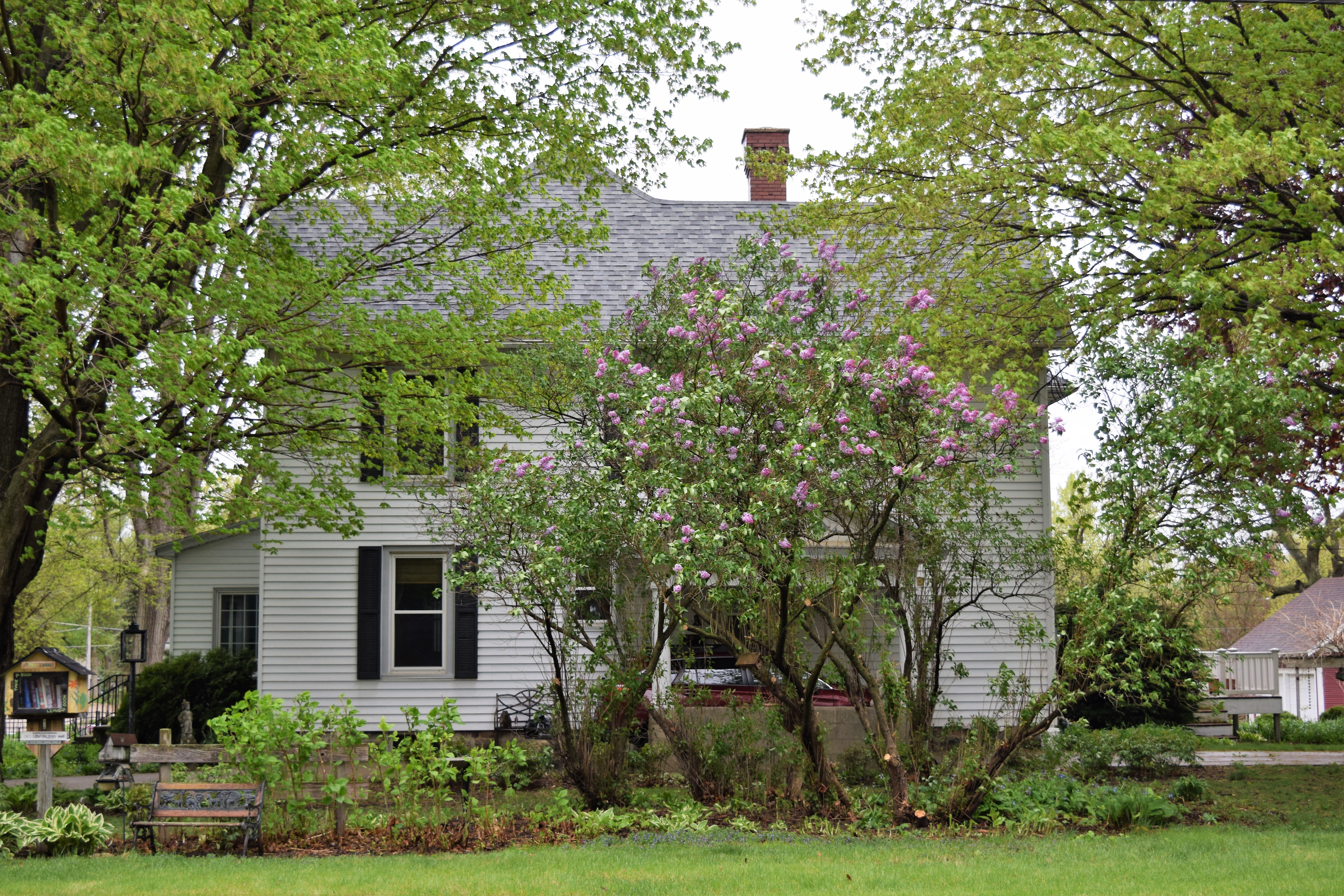

- Location within Iowa Location within the United States
- Location: 111 N. 11th Ave. Cherokee, Iowa
- Coordinates: 42°45′01.8″N 95°33′53.4″W
- Area: less than one acre
- Built: c. 1898
- NRHP reference No.: 100004427
- Added to NRHP: September 27, 2019

The Guy M. and Rose (Freeman) Gillette House is a historic building located in Cherokee, Iowa, United States. The two-story frame house was completed about 1898. It is significant because of its association with Guy Gillette, who resided here while he served in the United States Senate. He converted the living room, a bedroom, and the enclosed porch into office space. Here he would meet with constituents, give public presentations, and participate in various activities when the Senate was in recess. Gillette also lived here when he served as president of the American League for a Free Palestine, and in his post-political life. The house was listed on the National Register of Historic Places in 2019.
