= Lewis Hotel =

- U.S. National Register of Historic Places
- U.S. Historic district – Contributing property
- Fourth Street elevation

- Location within Iowa Location within the United States
- Location: 231 W. Main St. Cherokee, Iowa
- Coordinates: 42°44′58″N 95°33′10″W
- Area: less than one acre
- Built: 1899
- Built by: Robert A. Lewis
- Architect: Josselyn & Taylor
- Architectural style: Late 19th and Early 20th Century American Movements
- Website: Historiclewishotel.com
- Part of: Cherokee Commercial Historic District (ID05000903)
- NRHP reference No.: 97000963
- Added to NRHP: September 15, 1997

The Lewis Hotel is a historic building located in Cherokee, Iowa, United States. Robert A. Lewis was a New York City native who settled in the Cherokee area in 1872. He had a background in carpentry, but he established a nursery in Cherokee. After moving into town he started planning for his hotel around 1897. He served as the contractor for its construction, and it was completed two years later. The hotel remained in the care of his family until 1966.

The three-story building was designed by the Cedar Rapids, Iowa architectural firm of Josselyn & Taylor in the Second Renaissance Revival style. Lewis built the hotel on an irregular, trapezoidal-shaped parcel. The odd shape of the parcelled to an irregular building layout, with a series of bays jutting out on the Fourth Street side - for this reason, the building's south (back) end is quite a bit wider than its north (front) end. The first-floor exterior is composed of limestone, while the upper two floors are brick. The first floor consists of 8,250 square feet of commercial space in three bays - central, east, and west. The lower basement level consists of 7,400 square feet in three bays - central, east, and west. The building sits on a trapezoid-shaped lot and because of that its facade on the Fourth Street side of the buildings in stepped back. The Illinois Central Railroad tracks were on the opposite of the street and the rail station was a block away, making this an ideal site for a hotel. A state hospital for the mentally ill was built in Cherokee in 1902, which also provided a source of hotel guests. The former hotel building was individually listed on the National Register of Historic Places in 1997. It was included as a contributing property in the Cherokee Commercial Historic District in 2005.

In 2021, Zachary Z. Zoul, Owner and Managing Member, announced that Zoul Properties LLC had acquired the Historic Lewis Hotel. Plans include restoring its historic exterior elevation and interior configuration, specifically with the grand lobby and foyer.

== Gallery ==
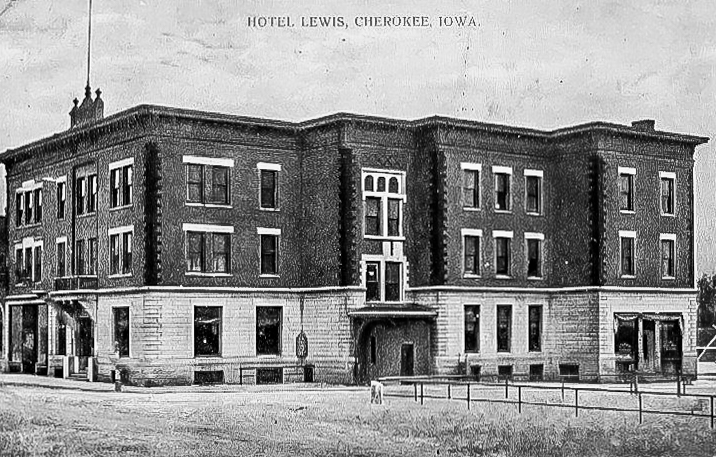
Exterior

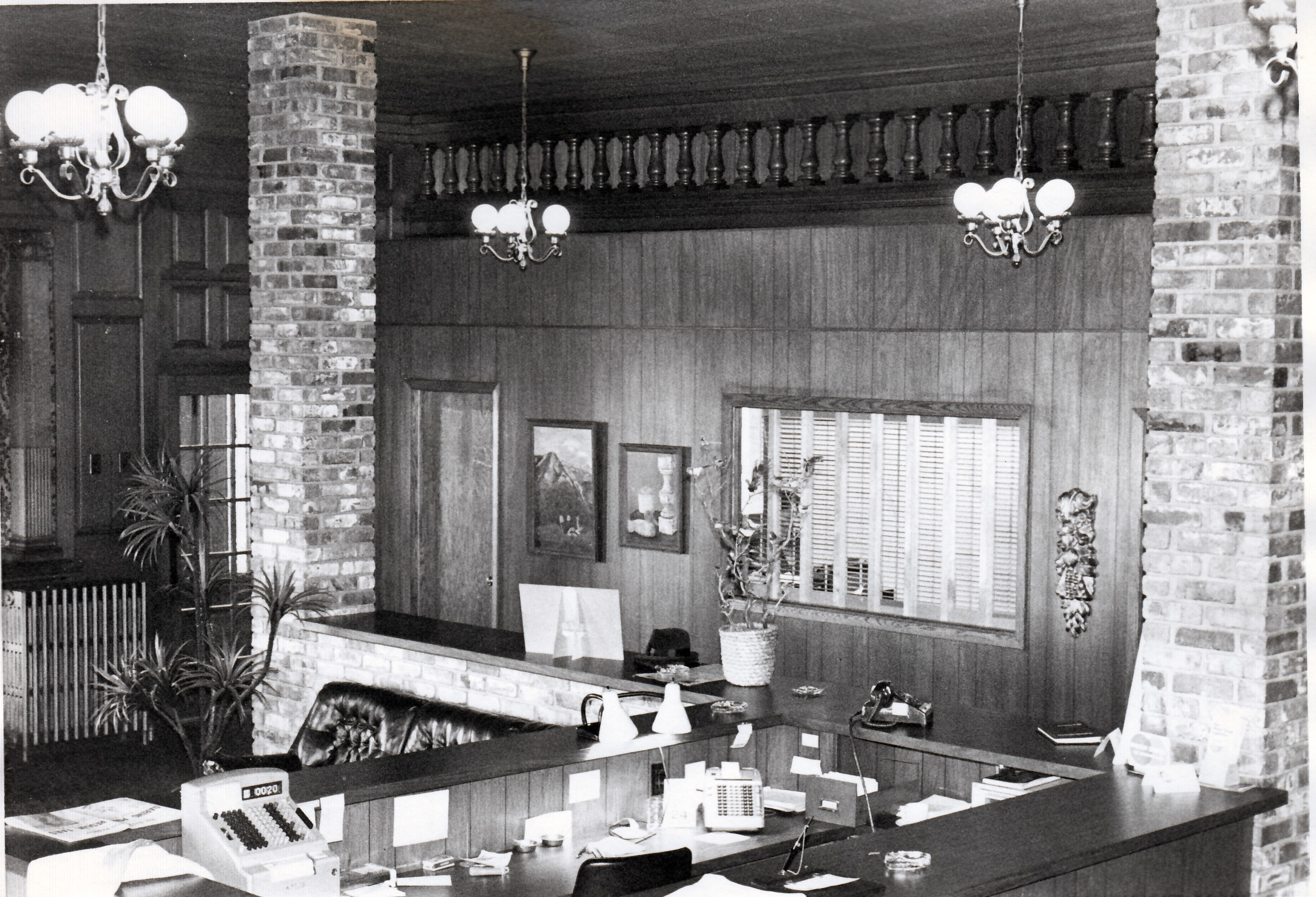
Interior

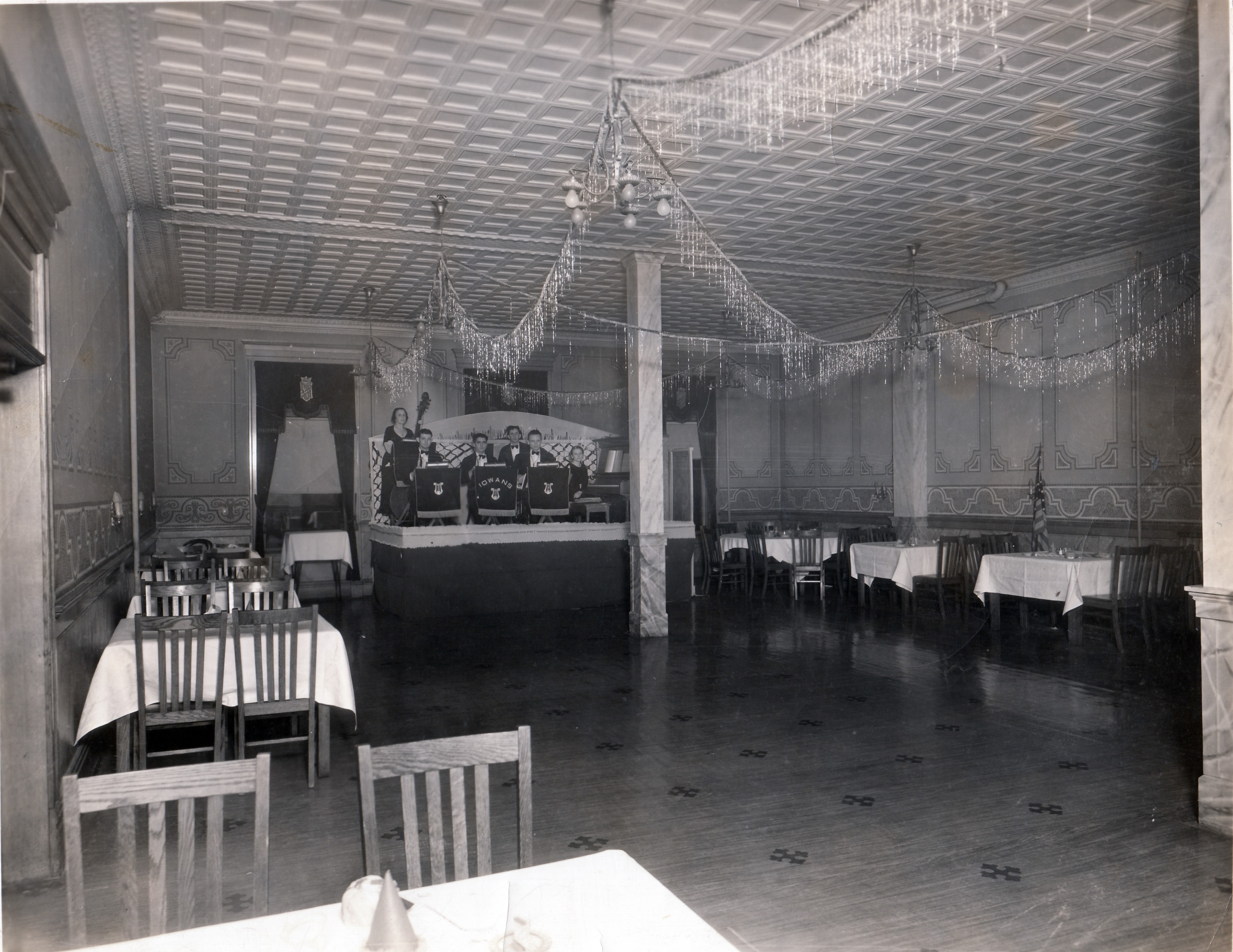
Ballroom

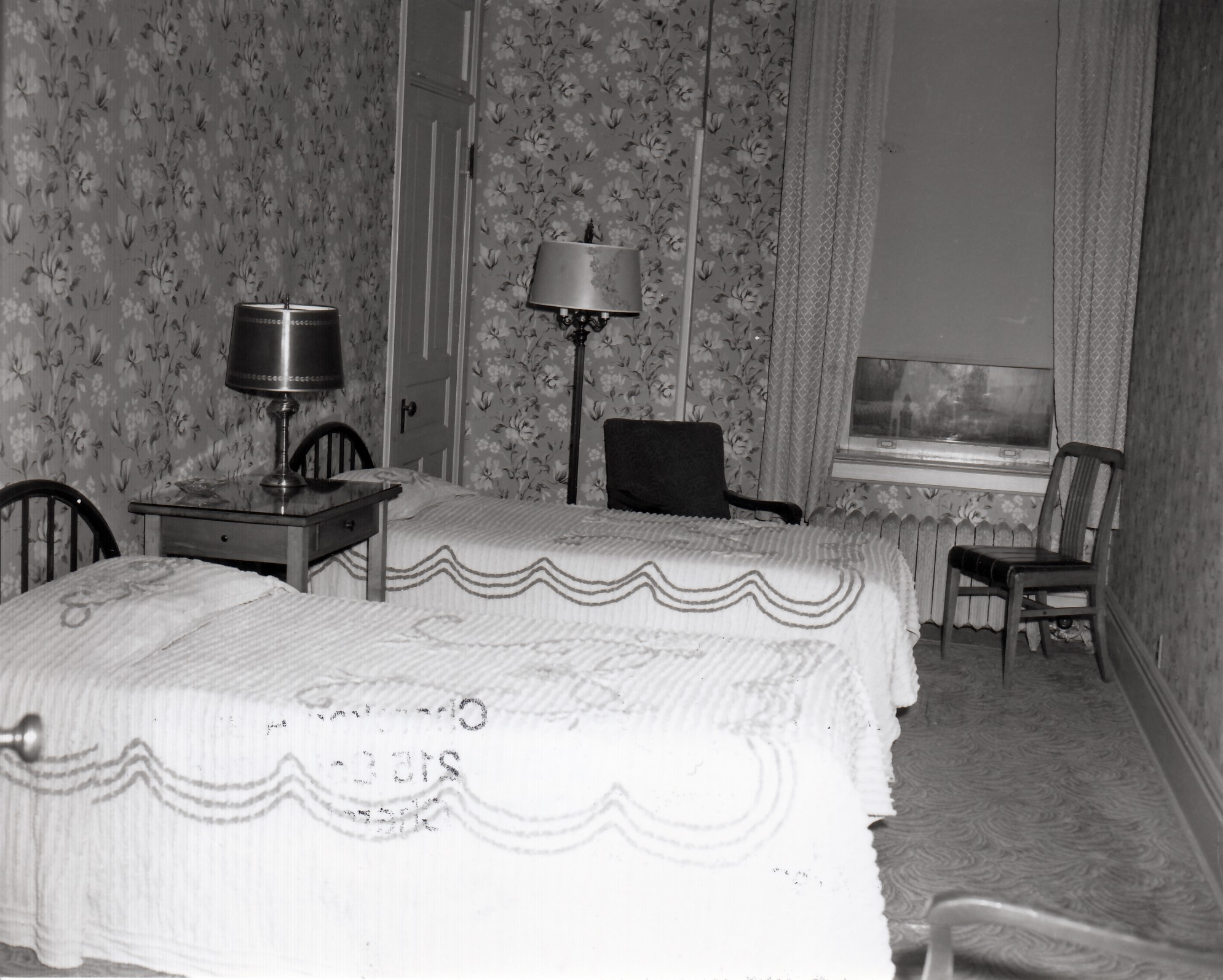
Typical room
