= Sioux Falls station (Illinois Central Railroad) =

Sioux Falls
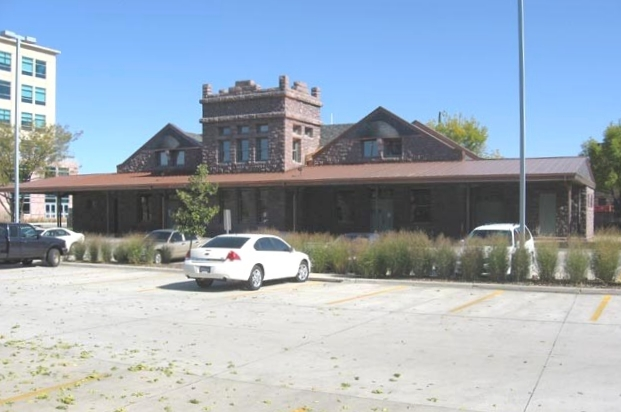
- The station in October 2009.

General information
- Location: Big Sioux River at 8th St, Sioux Falls, South Dakota 57104
- Coordinates: 43°32′58″N 96°43′24″W
- System: Former Illinois Central passenger rail station

History
- Opened: 1888

Former services
Preceding station	Illinois Central Railroad	Following station
Terminus	Sioux Falls – Cherokee	Rowena toward Cherokee
- Illinois Central Passenger Depot
- U.S. National Register of Historic Places
- Location within South Dakota Location within the United States
- Location: Big Sioux River at 8th St, Sioux Falls, South Dakota
- Coordinates: 43°32′58″N 96°43′24″W
- Built: 1888
- Architectural style: Queen Anne
- NRHP reference No.: 83003013
- Added to NRHP: August 18, 1983
Location

The Illinois Central Passenger Depot is a historic railroad station located at the Big Sioux River at 8th St in Sioux Falls, South Dakota. The Illinois Central was the fourth railroad to reach Sioux Falls on December 19, 1887. The station was designed by L.A. Hill and opened in 1888. The stone building has a Queen Anne design utilizing local Sioux quartzite with a light purple color as the principal building material. The tower room contained the ticket office while the rear projection contained the wash rooms. On either side of the ticket office were the passenger waiting rooms and beyond them, separated by solid masonry walls were the baggage rooms. The depot represents an unusual example of the Queen Anne style in railroad architecture.

The station was added to the National Register of Historic Places on August 18, 1983.
