= Lemuel C. and Mary (Vaughn) Boughton House =

Historic house in Iowa, United States

- U.S. National Register of Historic Places
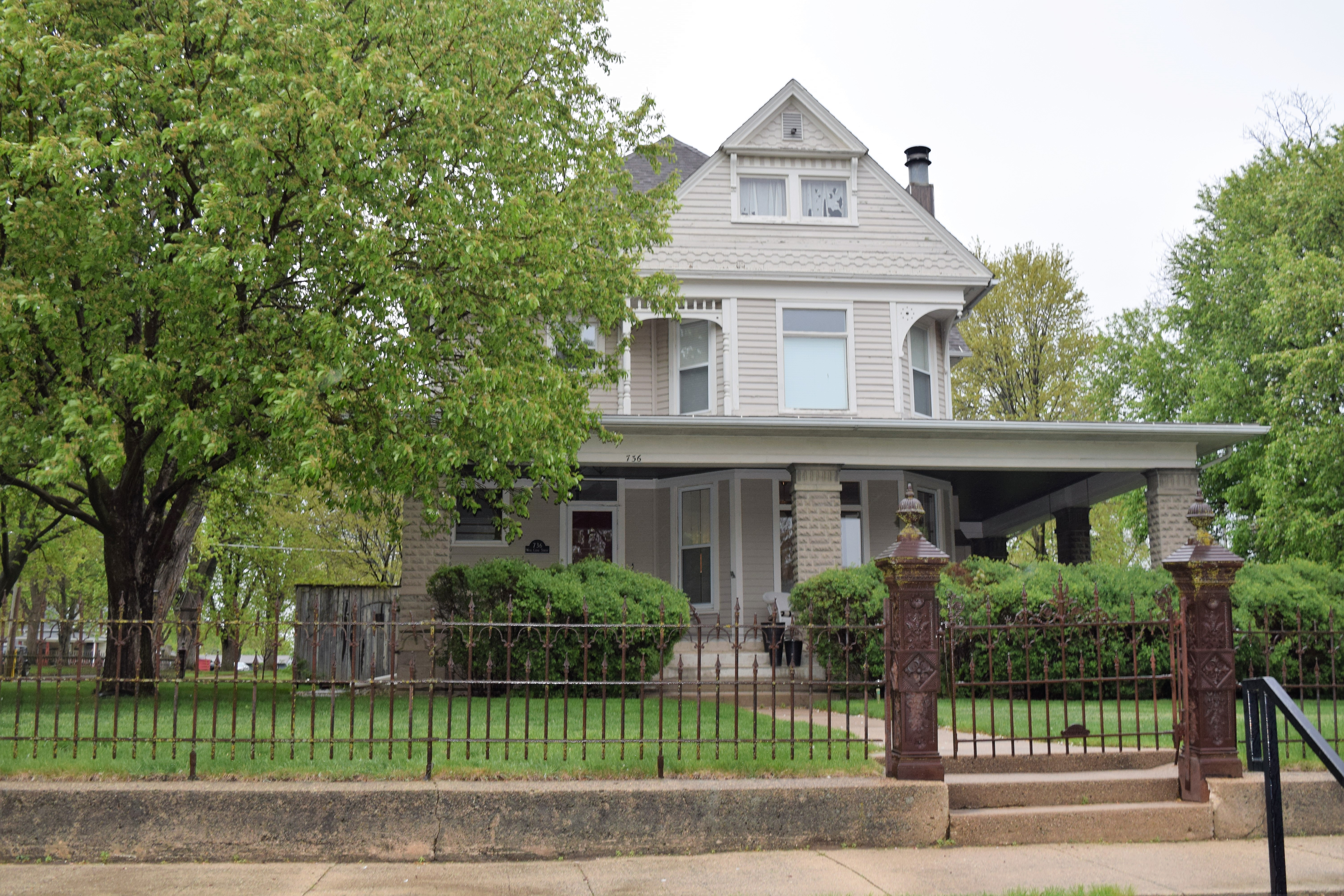

- Location within Iowa Location within the United States
- Location: 736 W. Cedar St. Cherokee, Iowa
- Coordinates: 42°45′07.3″N 95°33′36.4″W
- Area: less than one acre
- Built: 1891
- Architectural style: Queen Anne
- NRHP reference No.: 100004428
- Added to NRHP: September 27, 2019

The Lemuel C. and Mary (Vaughn) Boughton House is a historic building located in Cherokee, Iowa, United States. The 2½-story, frame, Queen Anne house was completed in 1891. The exterior features cottage bay windows, projecting gabled bay windows on the central pyramidal-roof, and decorative eaves. The concrete wrap-around porch is not original to the house and was added in 1910. An iron fence surrounds the parameter of the property. The interior features decorative staircase railings and newel posts, molded baseboards, paneled doors, many with fluted jambs and bull's-eye corner blocks. Transoms are located over bedroom doors on the second floor. While Cherokee has other Queen Anne houses, the Boughton House is more architecturally elaborate. It was listed on the National Register of Historic Places in 2019.
