= St. Mary's High School (Colorado) =

Location
- 2501 East Yampa Street; Colorado Springs, Colorado 80909; United States; 38°50′47″N 104°47′3″W

Information
- School type: Private high school
- Motto: A Catholic, college-prep family since 1885
- Religious affiliation: Roman Catholicism
- Established: 1885; 141 years ago
- Educational authority: Diocese of Colorado Springs
- CEEB code: 060295
- NCES School ID: 02181537
- President: Tom Maj
- Teaching staff: 18.8 (on an FTE basis)
- Grades: 9–12
- Enrollment: 151 (2023–24)
- Student to teacher ratio: 8.0
- Colors: Kelly green and white
- Athletics conference: CHSAA
- Mascot: Pirate
- Affiliation: National Catholic Educational Association
- Website: smhscs.org

St. Mary's High School (SMHS) is a private Roman Catholic high school in Colorado Springs, Colorado. It is affiliated with the Diocese of Colorado Springs. In the 2023–24 academic year, the school enrolled 151 students. St. Mary's colors are kelly green and white, and its mascot is the Pirate.

== Notable alumni ==
- Ben F. Laposky, mathematician and artist
- John Suthers (class of 1971), Mayor of Colorado Springs
- Amanda Everlove, Paralympic silver medalist in swimming
