= Roy C. and Lena (Johnson) Seaman House =

Historic house in Iowa, United States

- U.S. National Register of Historic Places
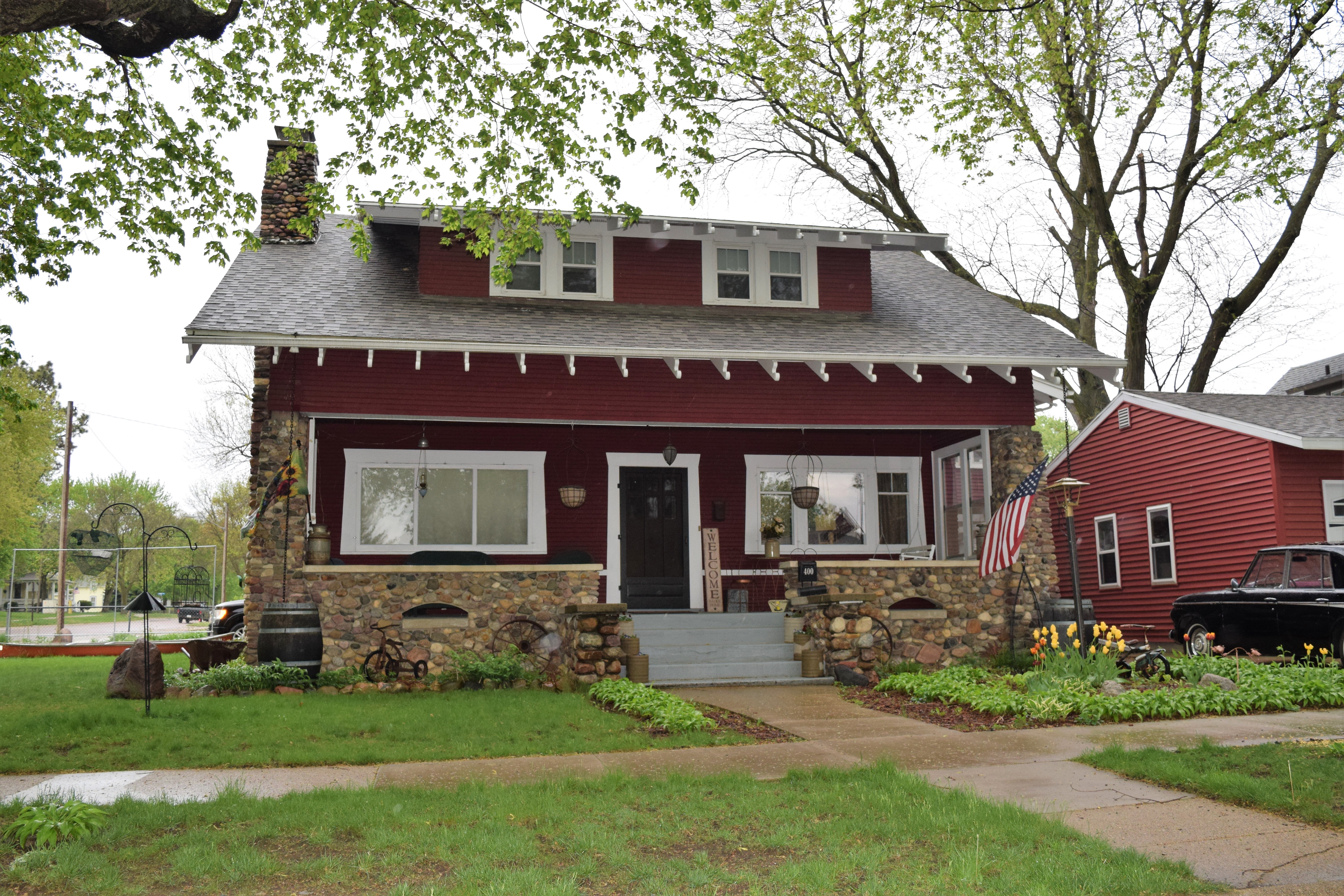

- Location within Iowa Location within the United States
- Location: 400 Magnetic Ave. Cherokee, Iowa
- Coordinates: 42°45′11.7″N 95°32′39.8″W
- Area: less than one acre
- Built: 1913
- Architectural style: Bungalow/Craftsman
- NRHP reference No.: 100004429
- Added to NRHP: September 27, 2019

The Roy C. and Lena (Johnson) Seaman House is a historic building located in Cherokee, Iowa, United States. The 1½-story, frame, American Craftsman style Bungalow was completed in 1913. The exterior features a side-gabled roof that extends over the full-width front porch. Of particular note are the decorative field or river stones that are utilized in the porch and the chimney, typical of the Craftsman style. Other decorative elements on the exterior include rafter tails on the porch and above the shed-roofed dormer windows. Much of the original woodwork has been maintained in the interior of the house. Faux timbers extend across the living room and the dining room ceilings. The interior also features built-in cabinets and a brick fireplace. The house was listed on the National Register of Historic Places in 2019.
