= Bastian site =

- Bastian Site
- U.S. National Register of Historic Places
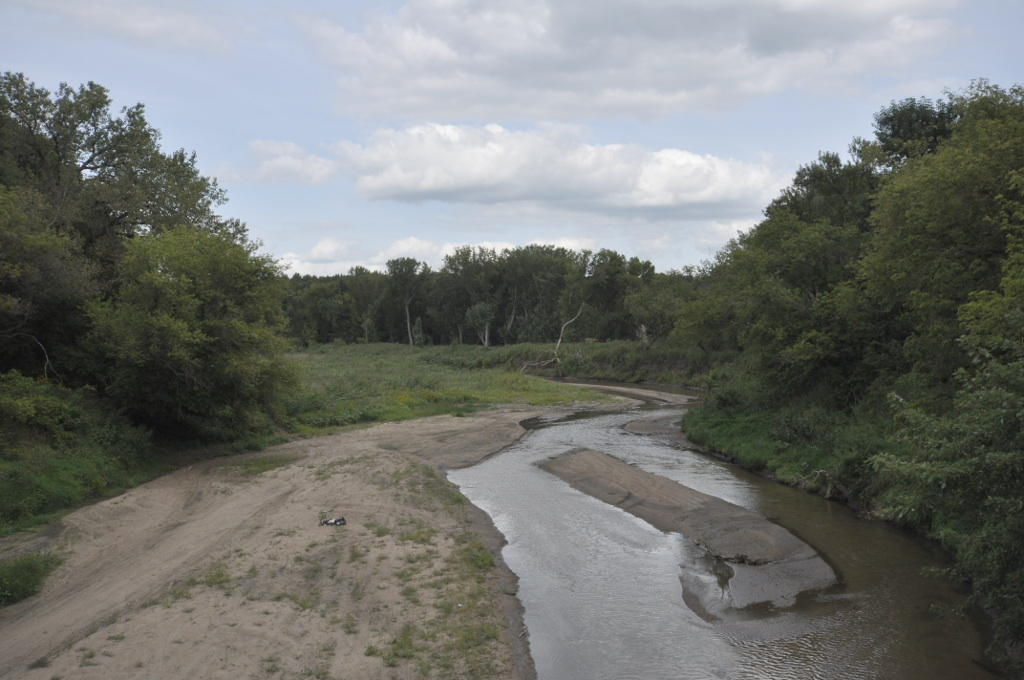
- Nearest city: Cherokee, Iowa
- NRHP reference No.: 76000742
- Added to NRHP: July 19, 1976

The Bastian site is an archaeological site associated with a village of the Oneota culture near Cherokee, Iowa, United States. The time period for this village appears to be from an intermediate era between village sites from the earlier Correctionville–Blue Earth phase and the later Orr phase. The later phase is from the late prehistoric and early historic periods, and include villages of the Siouan-speaking groups. The site was listed on the National Register of Historic Places in 1976.
