= Illinois Central Railroad Yard-Cherokee =

Historic district in Iowa, United States

- U.S. National Register of Historic Places
- U.S. Historic district
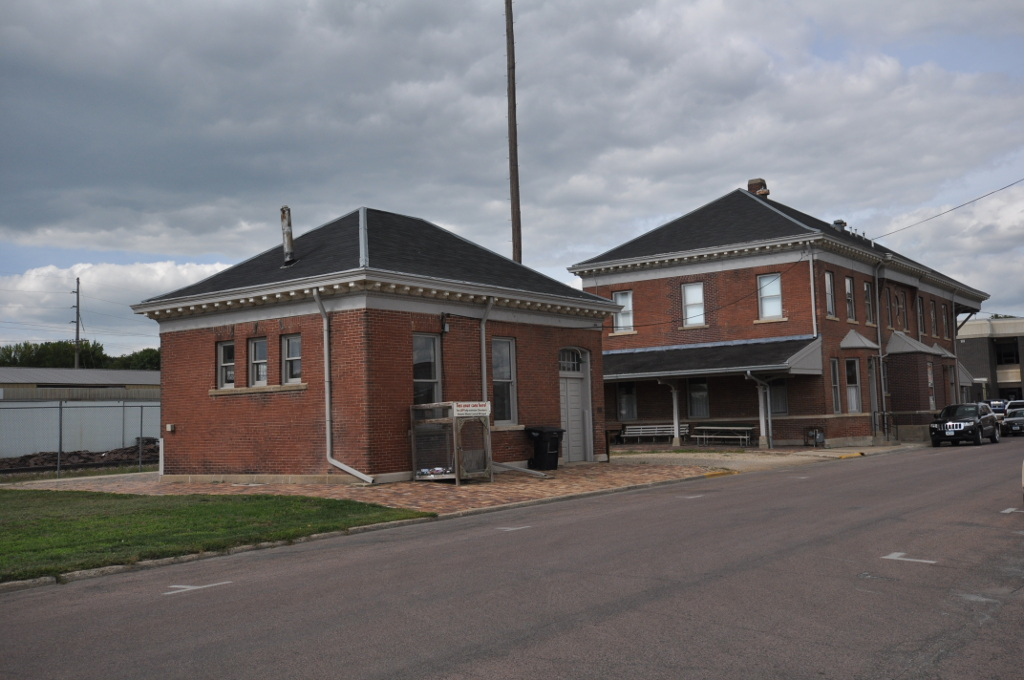

- Location within Iowa Location within the United States
- Location: Roughly bounded by S. 4th, 5th, W. Maple, and W. Beech Sts. Cherokee, Iowa
- Coordinates: 42°44′54″N 95°33′15″W
- Area: Approximately 19 acres (7.7 ha)
- Architect: Illinois Central Railroad
- MPS: Advent & Development of Railroads in Iowa MPS
- NRHP reference No.: 90001308
- Added to NRHP: September 6, 1990

The Illinois Central Railroad Yard, also known as Cherokee Illinois Central Station, is a nationally recognized historic district located in Cherokee, Iowa, United States. It was listed on the National Register of Historic Places in 1990. Cherokee was a hub for the Illinois Central Railroad's (IC) branch lines, and the railroad's westernmost division headquarters in the state. The district was a collection of structures that were associated with the IC's second and third building phases, 1860 to 1870 and 1886 to 1888, and the expansion of the roundhouse in 1915. It represented the last of the pre-Diesel era railroad yards left in Iowa. At the time of its nomination it contained 17 resources, which included seven contributing buildings, one contributing structure and nine non-contributing buildings. Ten of the buildings were of frame construction and seven were brick. Most of the buildings no longer exist, having been replaced by an agricultural cooperative. The former depot and American Express building remain.

The former depot is a 2 1/2-story brick structure on a limestone foundation, and capped with a hipped roof. It was designed by the architects of the Illinois Central Railroad. The interior featured two waiting rooms on the first floor, one for the men and one for women. Offices for the IC's division headquarters occupied the second floor. The exterior of the building was altered in the 1940s. The canopy over the old platform is a reconstruction of the original. The American Express building is a single-story brick structure built on a concrete and limestone foundation. It too was capped with a hipped roof. This building was altered in 1922. Both buildings are located next to each other along South Fourth Street.

Preceding station	Illinois Central Railroad	Following station
Marcus toward Sioux City	Sioux City – Chicago	Aurelia toward Chicago
Larrabee toward Sioux Falls	Sioux Falls – Cherokee	Terminus
