= Durant station =

Former railway station

Durant, MS
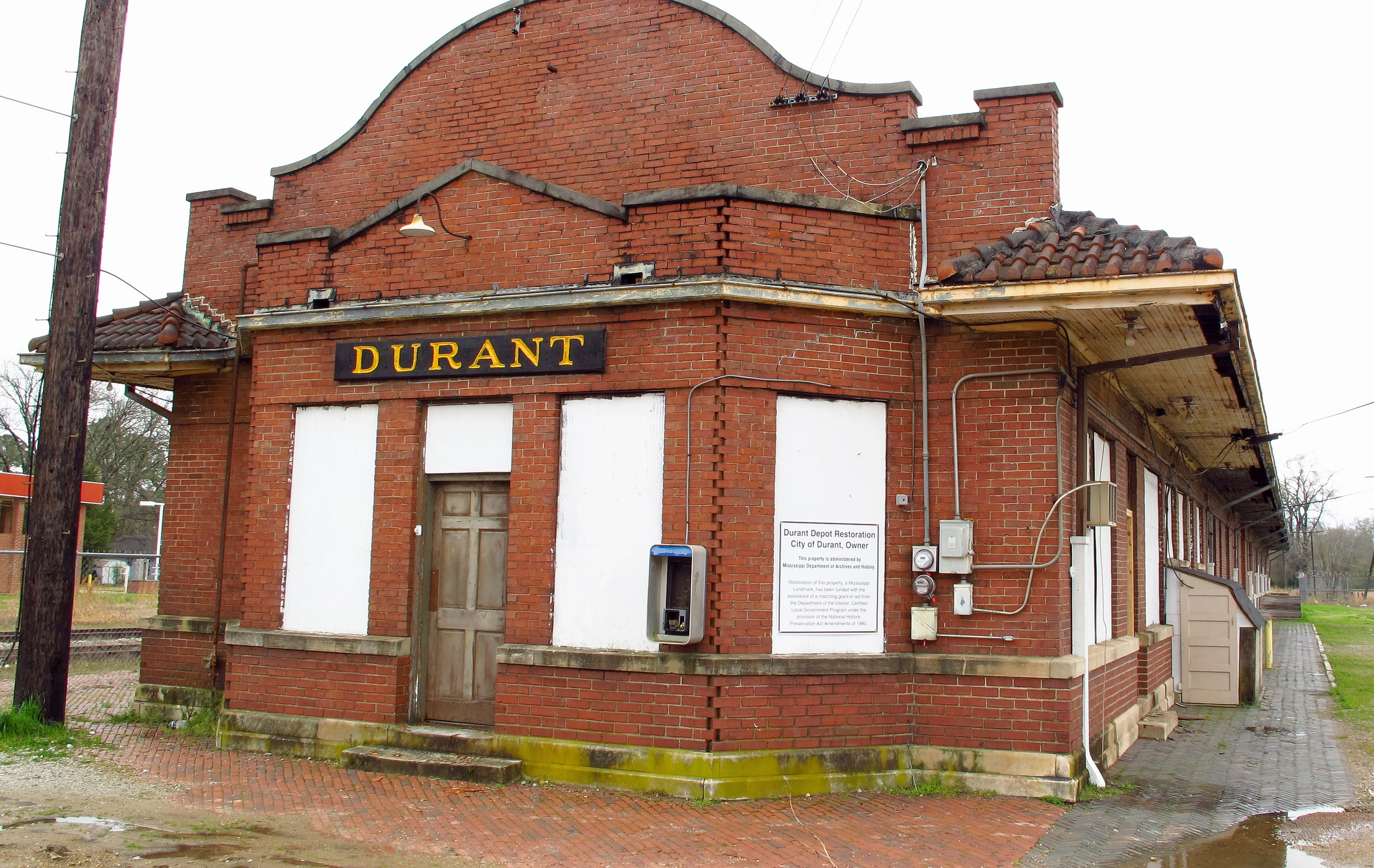

General information
- Location: 436 E. Mulberry St. Durant, Mississippi
- Coordinates: 33°04′27″N 89°51′11″W

History
- Opened: 1858
- Closed: September 10, 1995
- Rebuilt: 1909

Services
Preceding station	Amtrak	Following station
Canton toward New Orleans	City of New Orleans	Winona toward Chicago
Preceding station	Illinois Central Railroad	Following station
Vaughan toward New Orleans	Main Line	Winona toward Chicago
- Durant Illinois Central Railroad Depot
- U.S. National Register of Historic Places
- NRHP reference No.: 15000988
- Added to NRHP: January 19, 2016
Location

Durant station is a former railway station in Durant, Mississippi. The town was founded in 1858 as a station on the Mississippi Central Railroad, later part of the Illinois Central Railroad. The modern station building was constructed in 1909 after the previous station was heavily damaged in a fire. Amtrak trains began bypassing the station after September 10, 1995. It was added to the National Register of Historic Places on January 19, 2016. Restoration of the building began in 2018.
