= Ackley station =

- Illinois Central Combination Depot-Ackley
- U.S. National Register of Historic Places
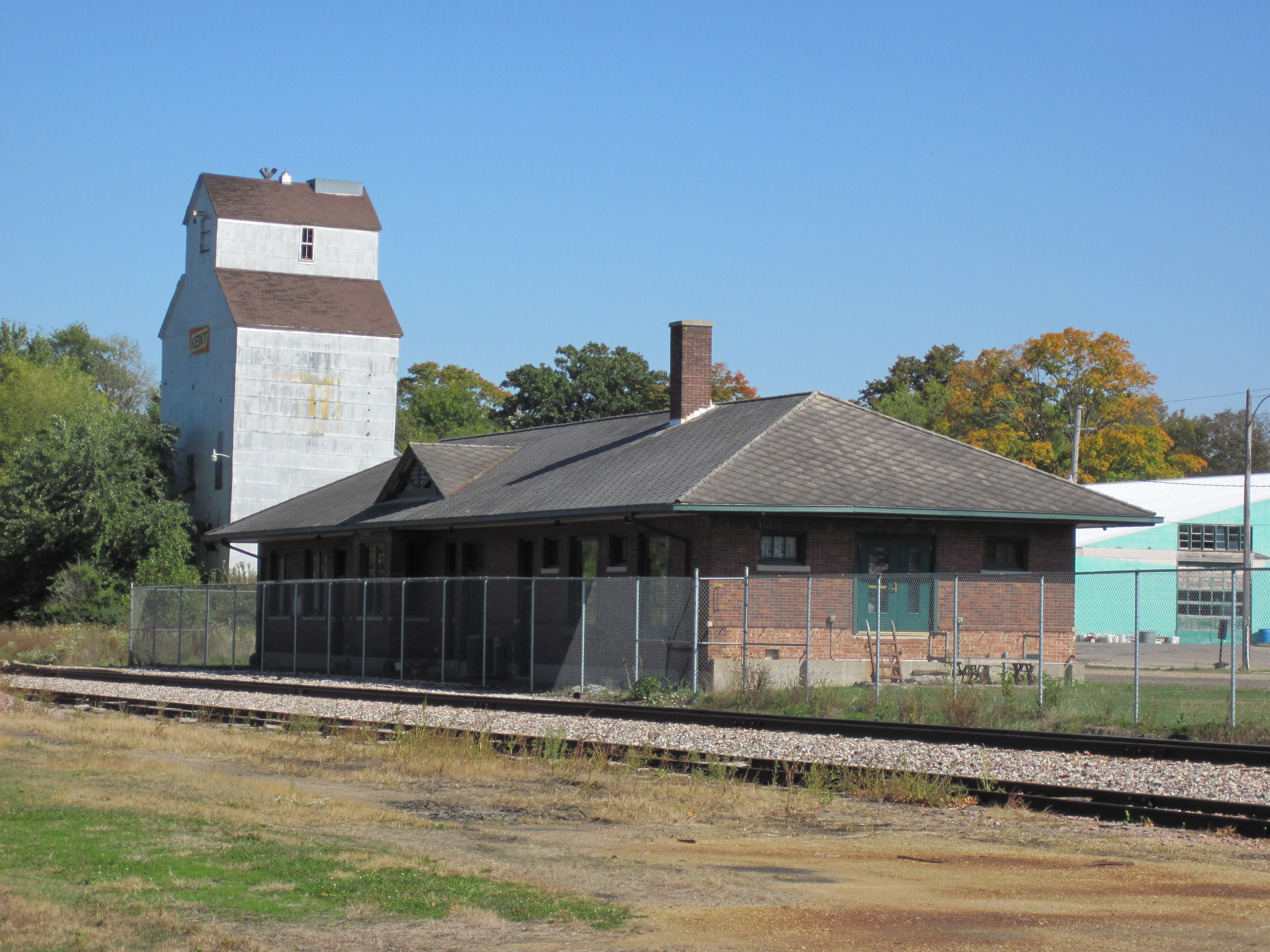
- The former depot in October 2009

- Location within Iowa Location within the United States
- Location: North of Railroad St., between State and Mitchell Sts., Ackley, Iowa
- Coordinates: 42°33′18.5″N 93°03′08.3″W
- Area: less than one acre
- Built: 1926-1927
- Built by: Coomer & Small Construction Co.
- Architect: J.H. Schott
- Architectural style: Tudor Revival; Prairie School
- MPS: Advent & Development of Railroads in Iowa MPS
- NRHP reference No.: 90001303
- Added to NRHP: September 6, 1990

The Ackley station (also known as the Illinois Central Combination Depot) is a former railroad station located in Ackley, Iowa, United States. The Dubuque & Sioux City Railroad, an affiliate of the Illinois Central Railroad, laid the first rail track to Iowa Falls in 1865. Two years later the Iowa Falls & Sioux City Railroad, another IC affiliate, continued construction of the line to the west, and it reached Sioux City by 1870. They built a plain, two-story frame depot to serve Ackley. From the 1890s to the 1920s the IC replaced its first generation stations with new brick structures. IC architect J.H. Schott designed the new depot at Ackley, and it was built by Coomer & Small Construction Company of Sioux City. The long and low single-story brick building exhibits influences from the Prairie School and the Tudor Revival style. A combination depot is one that incorporates passenger and freight services in the same building. It was also an island depot, meaning that it sat in the middle of the tracks. It was one of the last replacement depots the IC built before the Great Depression. The building was listed on the National Register of Historic Places in 1990.

Preceding station	Illinois Central Railroad	Following station
Rathon toward Sioux City	Sioux City – Chicago	Aplington toward Chicago
