= Belleville station (Illinois Central Railroad) =

- Belleville Illinois Central Railroad Depot
- U.S. National Register of Historic Places
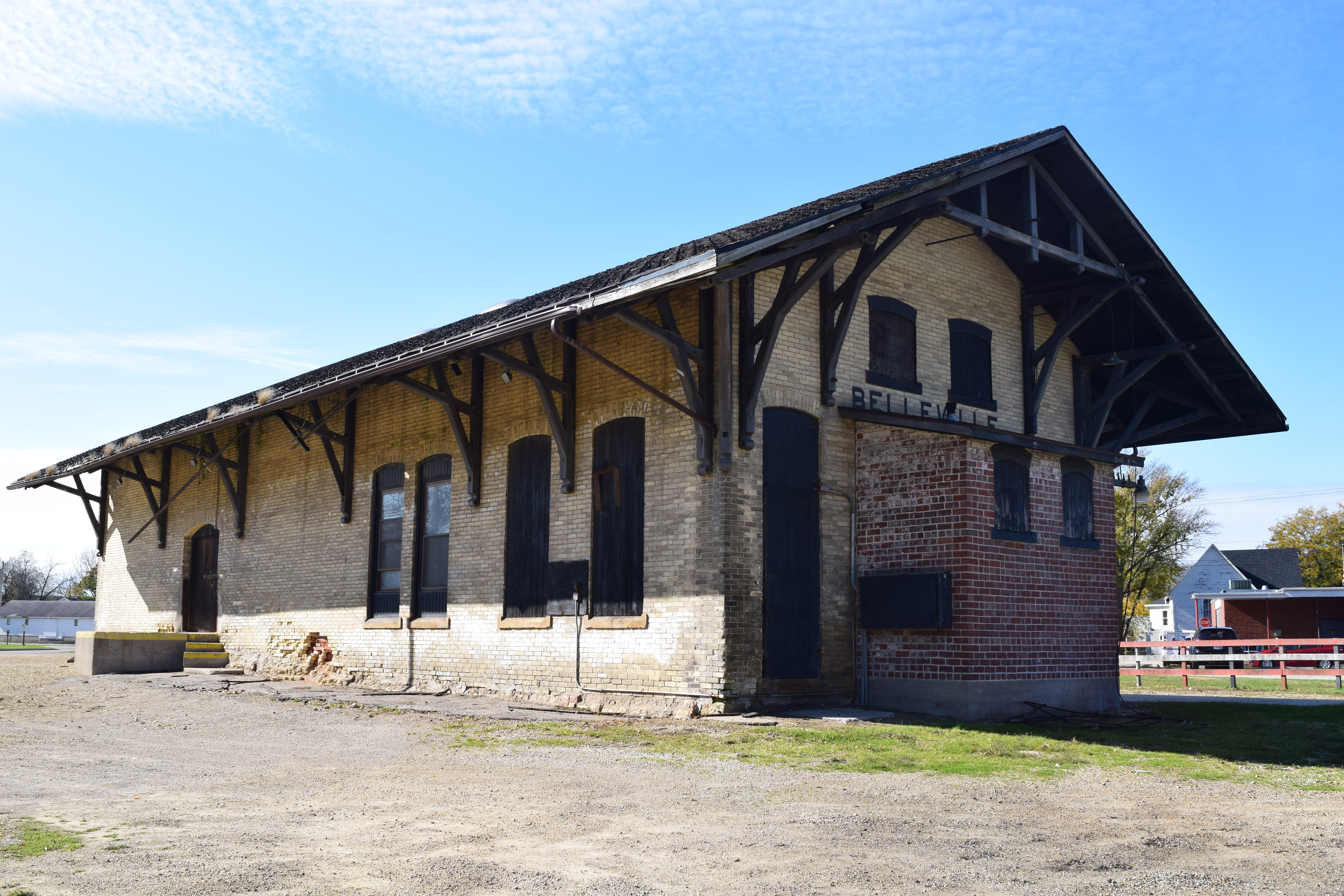
- Belleville Illinois Central Railroad Depot
- Location: 109 S. Park St. Belleville, Wisconsin
- Coordinates: 42.85835°N 89.53307°W
- Built: 1887-1888
- Architectural style: Italianate
- NRHP reference No.: 16000831
- Added to NRHP: December 6, 2016

Belleville station is a historic train station in Belleville, Wisconsin.

== History ==
Built for Illinois Central Railroad, the depot serviced both passenger and freight trains. The depot stopped serving passenger trains in 1931 and freight trains in 1943. For a number of decades afterwards, the building was used by multiple parties to store grain.

Additionally, the depot has become a focal point of the Badger State Trail. The trail itself is made up of the former rail line the depot served, as the pathway was acquired by the Wisconsin Department of Natural Resources after rail operations ceased.

In 2016, it was added to the State and the National Register of Historic Places as the Belleville Illinois Central Railroad Depot.

Preceding station	Illinois Central Railroad	Following station
Basco toward Madison	Madison – Freeport	Monticello, WI toward Freeport
