= Cherokee, Iowa =

- City
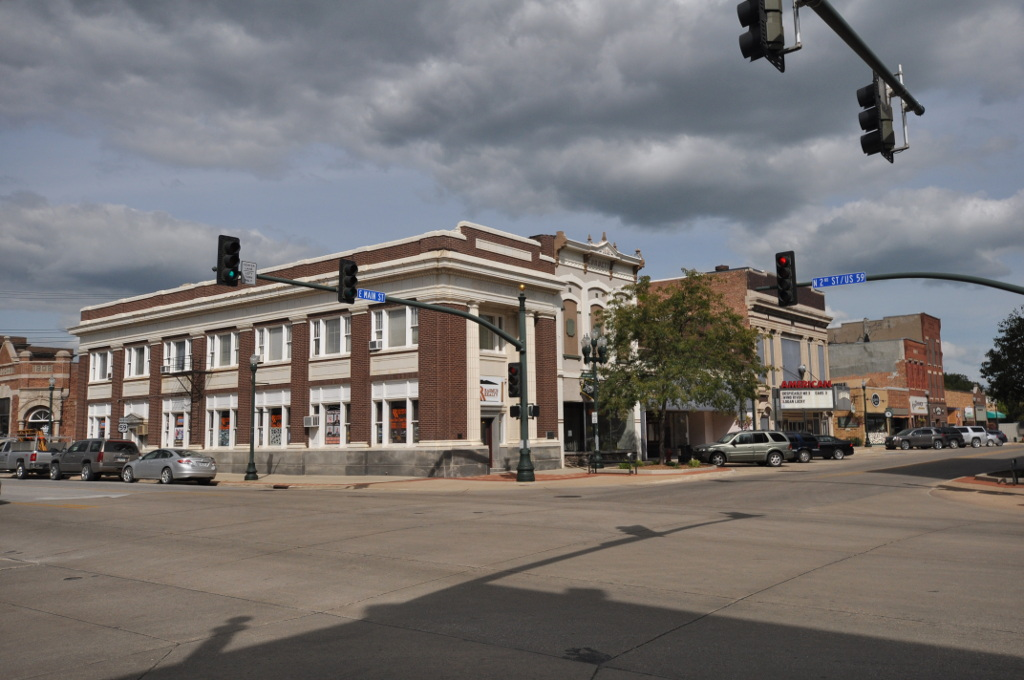
- Downtown Cherokee
- Motto: "Citizens With a Passion for Community and a Community with Passion for its Citizens!"
- Location of Cherokee, Iowa
- Coordinates: 42°45′20″N 95°33′11″W
- Country: USA
- State: Iowa
- County: Cherokee

Government
  - Type: Mayor-council

Area
  - Total: 6.86 sq mi (17.76 km^{2})
  - Land: 6.83 sq mi (17.70 km^{2})
  - Water: 0.023 sq mi (0.06 km^{2})
- Elevation: 1,198 ft (365 m)

Population (2020)
  - Total: 5,199
  - Density: 760.9/sq mi (293.77/km^{2})
- Time zone: UTC-6 (Central (CST))
  - Summer (DST): UTC-5 (CDT)
- ZIP code: 51012
- Area code: 712
- FIPS code: 19-13080
- GNIS feature ID: 2393817
- Website: www.cherokeeiowa.net

Cherokee (Note: /tʃɛrəˈkiː/) is a city in and the county seat of Cherokee County, Iowa, United States. The population was 5,199 at the 2020 Census, down from 5,369 in 2000.

== History ==
Cherokee was laid out as a town in 1870, and was named for the Southeast Indian tribe, most of whose members had been removed to Indian Territory in the late 1830s. Cherokee was incorporated on April 5, 1873.

Tyson Foods closed its Tyson Foods Deli Plant in Cherokee on September 27, 2014. Tyson was the largest employer in Cherokee at the time, and they laid off approximately 450 employees or over eight percent of the total population of Cherokee.

== Geography ==
According to the United States Census Bureau, the city has a total area of 6.45 square miles (16.71 km^{2}), of which 6.43 square miles (16.65 km^{2}) is land and 0.02 square miles (0.05 km^{2}) is water.

=== Climate ===
Cherokee has a typical Iowa humid continental climate (Köppen Dfa) featuring very warm summers and freezing to frigid winters. In the drought year of 1958, however, Cherokee received a mere 12.11 inches or 307.6 millimeters of precipitation, which remains the all-time record low for a calendar year anywhere in Iowa.

Climate data for Cherokee, Iowa (1991−2020 normals, extremes 1921−present)
Month	Jan	Feb	Mar	Apr	May	Jun	Jul	Aug	Sep	Oct	Nov	Dec	Year
Record high °F (°C)	67 (19)	68 (20)	86 (30)	94 (34)	106 (41)	103 (39)	108 (42)	109 (43)	101 (38)	94 (34)	80 (27)	68 (20)	109 (43)
Mean maximum °F (°C)	48.4 (9.1)	54.3 (12.4)	71.4 (21.9)	82.6 (28.1)	89.9 (32.2)	93.3 (34.1)	94.3 (34.6)	93.0 (33.9)	90.1 (32.3)	83.9 (28.8)	67.9 (19.9)	52.4 (11.3)	96.3 (35.7)
Mean daily maximum °F (°C)	26.7 (−2.9)	31.7 (−0.2)	44.7 (7.1)	58.9 (14.9)	70.5 (21.4)	80.8 (27.1)	84.3 (29.1)	81.9 (27.7)	75.4 (24.1)	62.0 (16.7)	45.5 (7.5)	31.8 (−0.1)	57.8 (14.3)
Daily mean °F (°C)	16.9 (−8.4)	21.4 (−5.9)	34.0 (1.1)	46.6 (8.1)	58.7 (14.8)	69.4 (20.8)	73.2 (22.9)	70.6 (21.4)	62.6 (17.0)	49.2 (9.6)	34.8 (1.6)	22.4 (−5.3)	46.7 (8.2)
Mean daily minimum °F (°C)	7.1 (−13.8)	11.1 (−11.6)	23.3 (−4.8)	34.4 (1.3)	46.9 (8.3)	58.0 (14.4)	62.1 (16.7)	59.4 (15.2)	49.8 (9.9)	36.4 (2.4)	24.0 (−4.4)	12.9 (−10.6)	35.4 (1.9)
Mean minimum °F (°C)	−17.1 (−27.3)	−11.0 (−23.9)	0.8 (−17.3)	18.6 (−7.4)	31.1 (−0.5)	44.3 (6.8)	49.5 (9.7)	47.5 (8.6)	33.4 (0.8)	19.9 (−6.7)	6.4 (−14.2)	−8.8 (−22.7)	−20.5 (−29.2)
Record low °F (°C)	−35 (−37)	−34 (−37)	−23 (−31)	−8 (−22)	21 (−6)	34 (1)	40 (4)	34 (1)	19 (−7)	−5 (−21)	−17 (−27)	−27 (−33)	−35 (−37)
Average precipitation inches (mm)	0.65 (17)	0.78 (20)	1.66 (42)	3.17 (81)	4.28 (109)	5.20 (132)	3.40 (86)	4.12 (105)	3.29 (84)	2.25 (57)	1.46 (37)	0.93 (24)	31.19 (792)
Average snowfall inches (cm)	7.5 (19)	8.4 (21)	5.2 (13)	2.7 (6.9)	0.1 (0.25)	0.0 (0.0)	0.0 (0.0)	0.0 (0.0)	0.0 (0.0)	0.5 (1.3)	4.0 (10)	9.4 (24)	37.8 (96)
Average precipitation days (≥ 0.01 in)	5.8	5.6	6.9	9.2	12.8	11.4	9.0	9.4	8.5	7.2	5.3	5.4	96.5
Average snowy days (≥ 0.1 in)	4.9	4.4	2.5	1.3	0.0	0.0	0.0	0.0	0.0	0.5	2.2	4.3	20.1
Source: NOAA

== Demographics ==
Historical population
Census	Pop.	Note	%±
1870	438		—
1880	1,523		247.7%
1890	3,441		125.9%
1900	3,865		12.3%
1910	4,884		26.4%
1920	5,824		19.2%
1930	6,443		10.6%
1940	7,469		15.9%
1950	7,705		3.2%
1960	7,724		0.2%
1970	7,272		−5.9%
1980	7,004		−3.7%
1990	6,026		−14.0%
2000	5,369		−10.9%
2010	5,253		−2.2%
2020	5,199		−1.0%
U.S. Decennial Census

=== 2020 census ===
As of the 2020 census, Cherokee had a population of 5,199 people, with 2,272 households and 1,271 families residing in the city. The population density was 769.5 inhabitants per square mile (297.1/km^{2}). There were 2,498 housing units at an average density of 369.7 per square mile (142.8/km^{2}).

The median age was 46.2 years. 20.8% of residents were under the age of 18. 4.4% were between the ages of 20 and 24; 22.0% were from 25 to 44; 25.4% were from 45 to 64; and 25.7% were 65 years of age or older. The gender makeup of the city was 49.4% male and 50.6% female. For every 100 females there were 97.5 males, and for every 100 females age 18 and over there were 96.8 males age 18 and over.

Of all households, 24.2% had children under the age of 18 living with them, 41.9% were married couples living together, 6.9% were cohabitating couples, 29.8% had a female householder with no spouse or partner present, and 21.5% had a male householder with no spouse or partner present. 44.1% of all households were non-families. 38.8% of all households were made up of individuals, and 20.4% had someone living alone who was 65 years of age or older.

Of all housing units, 9.0% were vacant. The homeowner vacancy rate was 2.9% and the rental vacancy rate was 7.9%. 90.3% of residents lived in urban areas, while 9.7% lived in rural areas.

Racial composition as of the 2020 census
Race	Number	Percent
White	4,696	90.3%
Black or African American	66	1.3%
American Indian and Alaska Native	17	0.3%
Asian	48	0.9%
Native Hawaiian and Other Pacific Islander	4	0.1%
Some other race	175	3.4%
Two or more races	193	3.7%
Hispanic or Latino (of any race)	342	6.6%

=== 2010 census ===
At the 2010 census there were 5,253 people in 2,316 households, including 1,339 families, in the city. The population density was 817.0 inhabitants per square mile (315.4/km^{2}). There were 2,569 housing units at an average density of 399.5 per square mile (154.2/km^{2}). The racial makeup of the city was 95.5% White, 1.0% African American, 0.3% Native American, 0.7% Asian, 0.2% Pacific Islander, 1.2% from other races, and 1.1% from two or more races. Hispanic or Latino of any race were 2.9%.

Of the 2,316 households 24.6% had children under the age of 18 living with them, 43.9% were married couples living together, 9.6% had a female householder with no husband present, 4.3% had a male householder with no wife present, and 42.2% were non-families. 37.3% of households were one person and 16.9% were one person aged 65 or older. The average household size was 2.14 and the average family size was 2.77.

The median age was 46.3 years. 20.2% of residents were under the age of 18; 7.1% were between the ages of 18 and 24; 21.1% were from 25 to 44; 28.9% were from 45 to 64; and 22.8% were 65 or older. The gender makeup of the city was 48.6% male and 51.4% female.

=== 2000 census ===
At the 2000 census there were 5,369 people in 2,362 households, including 1,393 families, in the city. The population density was 837.8 inhabitants per square mile (323.5/km^{2}). There were 2,556 housing units at an average density of 398.9 per square mile (154.0/km^{2}). The racial makeup of the city was 97.5% White, 0.54% African American, 0.22% Native American, 0.61% Asian, 0.54% from other races, and 0.58% from two or more races. Hispanic or Latino of any race were 1.51%.

Of the 2,362 households 25.9% had children under the age of 18 living with them, 47.3% were married couples living together, 8.6% had a female householder with no husband present, and 41.0% were non-families. 37.3% of households were one person and 19.0% were one person aged 65 or older. The average household size was 2.16 and the average family size was 2.82.

Age spread: 23.2% under the age of 18, 7.2% from 18 to 24, 22.9% from 25 to 44, 24.9% from 45 to 64, and 21.9% 65 or older. The median age was 43 years. For every 100 females, there were 92.3 males. For every 100 females age 18 and over, there were 85.4 males.

The median household income was $31,240 and the median family income was $42,333. Males had a median income of $28,350 versus $21,333 for females. The per capita income for the city was $17,846. About 5.0% of families and 7.0% of the population were below the poverty line, including 10.5% of those under age 18 and 4.5% of those age 65 or over.

== Arts and culture ==
=== Sites on the National Register of Historic Places ===
The nearby Cherokee Sewer Site is a well-preserved prehistoric Indian bison-processing site. Findings here have helped to redefine the Archaic period in the Midwest. The Phipps Site is a 1000-year-old indigenous Plains farming village, which may have been fortified. It is designated as a National Historic Landmark.

=== Annual events ===
The annual Jazz Festival is held in January, often headlined by Mark Pender, a member of the Basic Cable band.

The Cherokee County Fair, and the Cherokee Rodeo are held in the summer.

Creek Fest is an annual summer music festival held along the banks of Mill Creek. Past performers include Kid Rock, The Band Perry, Big & Rich, and Florida Georgia Line.

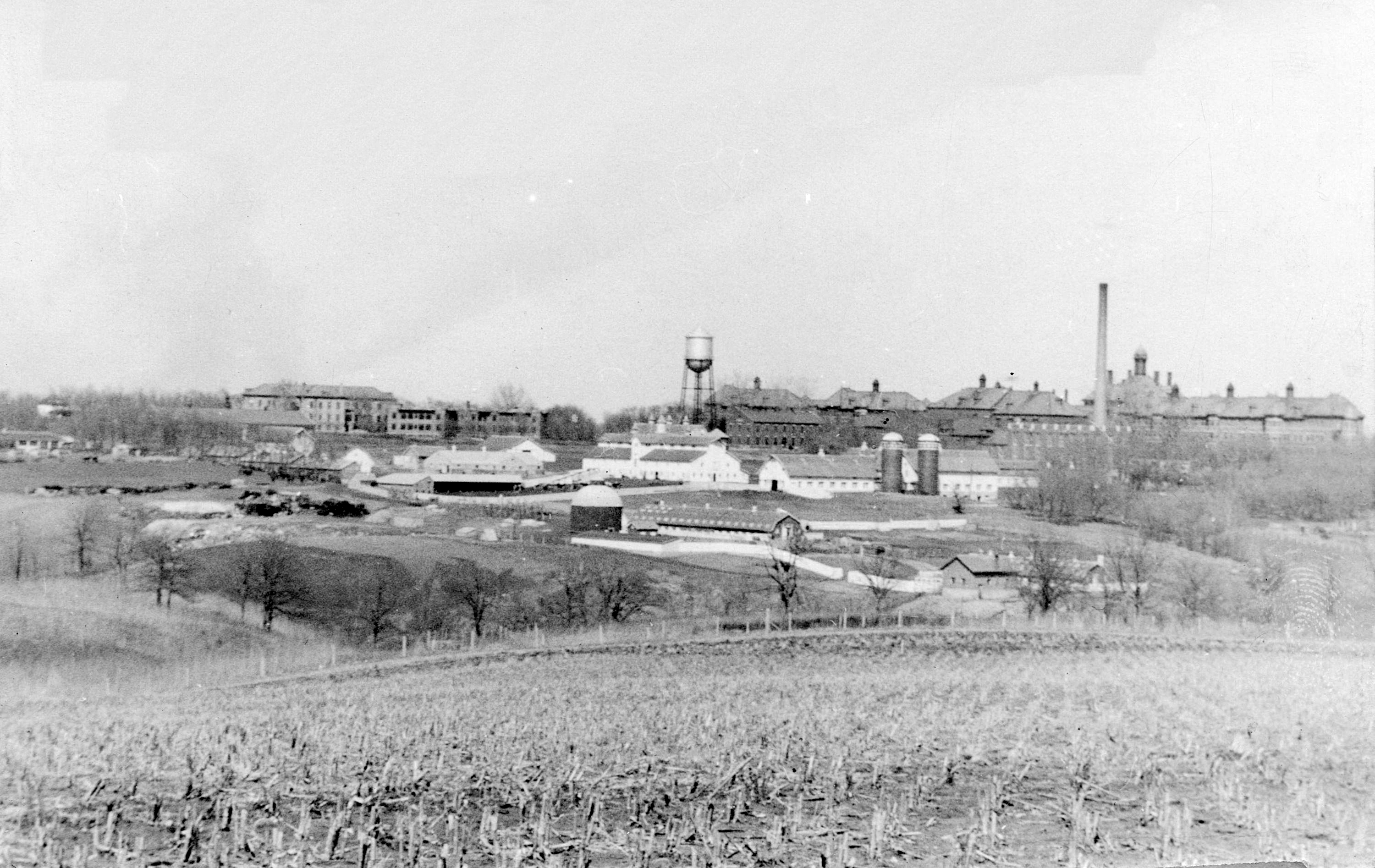
Mental Health Institute, 1940

=== Museums ===
Cherokee is the home of the Sanford Museum and Planetarium that opened in 1951. The founders, Mr & Mrs W.A. Sanford, intended to create a museum that was free and open to the public. The facility has exhibits and activities on a variety of subjects including: archaeology, art, astronomy, geology, history, natural history, and paleontology.

Cherokee may be the smallest town in the world to have its own symphony orchestra, the Cherokee Symphony. This 60-member orchestra has been referred to as "the best kept secret in Northwest Iowa".

== Education ==
The Cherokee Community School District operates local schools.

== Infrastructure ==
Hospitals in the city include Cherokee Regional Medical Center, and Cherokee Mental Health Institute.

== Notable people ==
- Ralph Block, film producer and screenwriter; president of Screen Actors Guild.
- Elwood Brown, basketball coach.
- Wilmer D. Elfrink, football and basketball player.
- Guy M. Gillette, U.S. Representative (1930 - 1936) and Senator (1936 -1945) from Iowa.
- Roger Goeb, composer.
- Kelly Goodburn, NFL punter and Super Bowl champion for Washington Redskins.
- Major General Joseph A. Green, Chief of the Coast Artillery Corps.
- T. J. Hockenson, tight end for the Minnesota Vikings.
- Dan Huseman, member of Iowa House of Representatives.
- Royal C. Johnson, 8th Attorney General and U.S. Representative from South Dakota; World War I veteran.
- Matt Koch, MLB baseball player with Arizona Diamondbacks.
- Ben F. Laposky, artist and mathematician.
- Edward Lindberg, Olympic gold medalist in 1912, track and field.
- Steve Melter, baseball player.
- Thomas Miller, Iowa newspaper editor and politician
- Spike Nelson, football player and coach.
- Ken Nordine, voiceover.
- Doug Ohlson, abstract artist.
- Jason Ravnsborg, 31st Attorney General of South Dakota.
- Laurence Rickels, theorist and philosopher, studied vampires, the Devil, technology and science fiction.
- General John D. Ryan, US Air Force Chief of Staff, 1969–71.
- Francis L. Sampson, Army officer whose rescue of young soldier inspired film Saving Private Ryan.
- Harold D. Schuster, editor and film director.
- Adam Timmerman, NFL lineman and Super Bowl champion for St. Louis Rams and Green Bay Packers.
- Steven VanRoekel, second Federal Chief Information Officer of the United States
- Stanton Warburton, U.S. Representative from Washington; moved to Cherokee.
