= Maurice Van Nostrand =

American politician (1925–1991)

Member of the Iowa House of Representatives from the 31st district
- In office January 9, 1967 – January 10, 1971
- Preceded by: Multi-member district
- Succeeded by: Clyde Rex
- In office January 14, 1963 – January 10, 1965
- Preceded by: Harry Gittins; Richard Stageman
- Succeeded by: Multi-member district

Personal details
- Born: February 9, 1925 Benedict, Nebraska
- Died: October 8, 1991 (aged 66) Chandler, Arizona
- Party: Republican

Maurice Van Nostrand (February 9, 1925 – October 8, 1991) was an American politician who served in the Iowa House of Representatives from the 31st district from 1963 to 1965 and from 1967 to 1971 and as Chairman of the State Commerce Commission from 1971 to 1979. He ran for the United States Senate in 1978 with Governor Robert Ray's endorsement but lost to former Lieutenant Governor Roger Jepsen, who proceeded to defeat incumbent Democratic Senator Dick Clark in the general election.

He died of a heart attack on October 8, 1991, in Chandler, Arizona at age 66.
