= Jack Miller (Iowa politician) =

American politician and judge

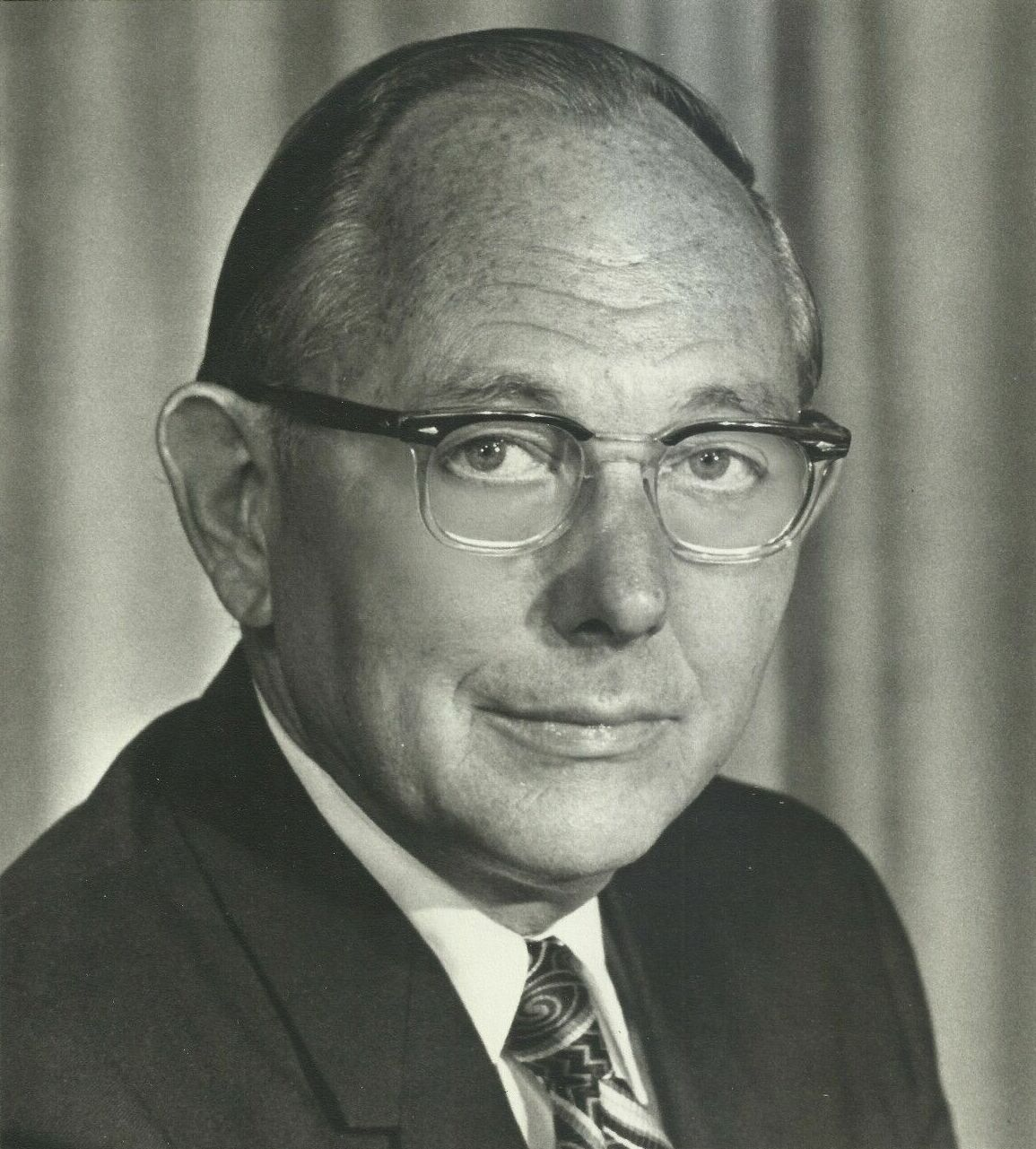

Senior Judge of the United States Court of Appeals for the Federal Circuit
- In office June 6, 1985 – August 29, 1994

Judge of the United States Court of Appeals for the Federal Circuit
- In office October 1, 1982 – June 6, 1985
- Appointed by: operation of law
- Preceded by: Seat established by 96 Stat. 25
- Succeeded by: Glenn L. Archer Jr.

Associate Judge of the United States Court of Customs and Patent Appeals
- In office July 6, 1973 – October 1, 1982
- Appointed by: Richard Nixon
- Preceded by: J. Lindsay Almond
- Succeeded by: Seat abolished

United States Senator from Iowa
- In office January 3, 1961 – January 3, 1973
- Preceded by: Thomas E. Martin
- Succeeded by: Dick Clark

Member of the Iowa Senate from the 32nd district
- In office January 14, 1957 – January 2, 1961
- Preceded by: Charles Van Eaton
- Succeeded by: Charles Van Eaton

Member of the Iowa House of Representatives from the 58th district
- In office January 10, 1955 – January 13, 1957
- Preceded by: Robert Carlson
- Succeeded by: Donald V. Doyle; John M. Naughton

Personal details
- Born: Jack Richard Miller; June 6, 1916 Chicago, Illinois, U.S.
- Died: August 29, 1994 (aged 78) Temple Terrace, Florida, U.S.
- Party: Republican
- Education: Creighton University (AB); Catholic University of America (AM); Columbia Law School (JD)

Jack Richard Miller (June 6, 1916 – August 29, 1994) was an American politician and jurist who served as a Republican United States senator from Iowa for two terms from 1961 to 1973. He later served as a United States circuit judge of the United States Court of Appeals for the Federal Circuit.

== Education and career ==
Miller was born in Chicago, Illinois. He first moved to Sioux City, Iowa, in 1932 as a teenager. He attended The Oratory School in England, then received an Artium Baccalaureus degree from Creighton University in 1938 and an Artium Magister degree from the Catholic University of America in 1939. During World War II, Miller served with the United States Army Air Corps from 1942 to 1946, attaining the rank of lieutenant colonel. His military service included the China-Burma-India Theater, the faculty at the Army Command and General Staff College at Fort Leavenworth, and duty at Air Force Headquarters in Washington, D.C. After the war, Miller received his Juris Doctor from Columbia Law School in 1946, and did postgraduate study at the University of Iowa College of Law later that year. He served between 1947 and 1948 as an attorney with the Office of Chief Counsel of the United States Internal Revenue Service. After one year as an assistant professor of law at Notre Dame Law School, he then returned to Sioux City, where he went into private practice.

== Political career ==
Miller was elected to the Iowa House of Representatives in 1955, and to the Iowa Senate in 1957. Miller was first elected to the United States Senate in 1960. In a race to replace the retiring Republican Senator Thomas E. Martin, Miller defeated Iowa's sitting governor, Herschel C. Loveless, in a close contest. Miller was a member of the Senate Finance Committee. He was reelected in 1966, easily defeating Democrat E. B. Smith, but in 1972 was defeated in an upset by Democrat Dick Clark. During a phone call in the early hours of the morning following that election, President Nixon told Henry Kissinger that "we lost Jack Miller because he's a jackass."

Miller voted in favor of the Civil Rights Act of 1964, as well as the 24th Amendment to the U.S. Constitution, the Voting Rights Act of 1965, and the confirmation of Thurgood Marshall to the U.S. Supreme Court, while Miller did not vote on the Civil Rights Act of 1968.

== Federal judicial service ==
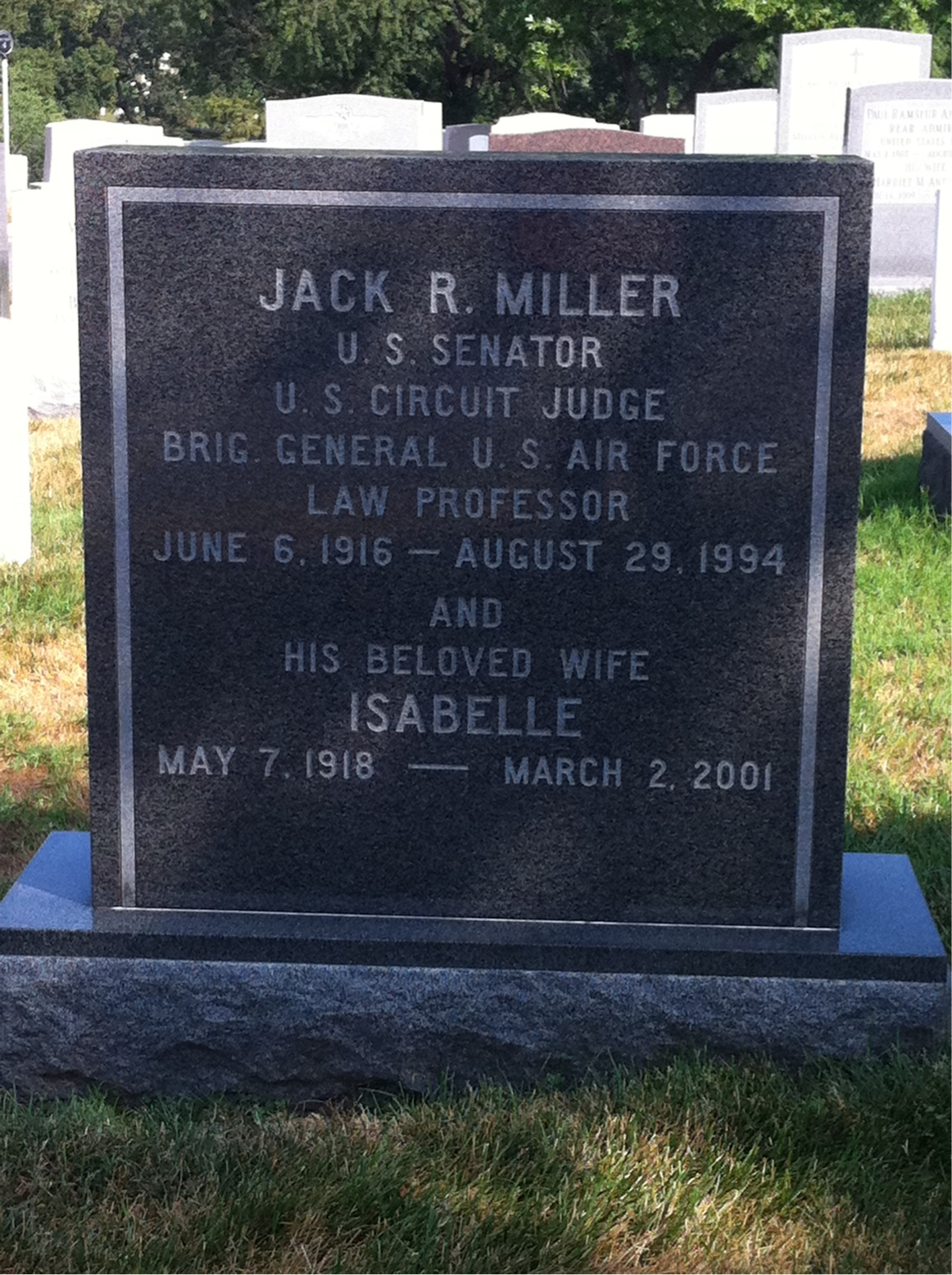
Grave at Arlington National Cemetery

Miller was nominated by President Richard Nixon on June 28, 1973, to a seat on the United States Court of Customs and Patent Appeals vacated by Judge J. Lindsay Almond. He was confirmed by the United States Senate on June 28, 1973, and received his commission on July 6, 1973. He was reassigned by operation of law on October 1, 1982, to the United States Court of Appeals for the Federal Circuit, to a new seat authorized by 96 Stat. 25. He assumed senior status on June 6, 1985. His service terminated on August 29, 1994, due to his death.

== Retirement and death ==
Miller retired to Temple Terrace, Florida, where he died on August 29, 1994. He is interred at Arlington National Cemetery.

== Sources ==
- United States Court of Appeals for the Federal Circuit: A History: 1990–2002 / compiled by members of the Advisory Council to the United States Court of Appeals for the Federal Circuit in celebration of the court's twentieth anniversary. Washington, D.C.: U.S. Court of Appeals for the Federal Circuit. 2004. p. 147. LCCN 2004050209.

Party political offices
Preceded by Thomas E. Martin	Republican nominee for United States Senator from Iowa (Class 2); 1960, 1966, 1972	Succeeded by Roger Jepsen
U.S. Senate
Preceded by Thomas E. Martin	United States Senator (Class 2) from Iowa; 1961–1973; Served alongside: Bourke B. Hickenlooper, Harold Hughes	Succeeded by Dick Clark
Preceded by George Aiken	Ranking Member of the Senate Agriculture Committee; 1971–1973	Succeeded by Carl Curtis
Legal offices
Preceded by J. Lindsay Almond	Associate Judge of the United States Court of Customs and Patent Appeals; 1973–1982	Seat abolished
Preceded by Seat established by 96 Stat. 25	Judge of the United States Court of Appeals for the Federal Circuit; 1982–1985	Succeeded by Glenn L. Archer Jr.
