= 1966 United States Senate election in Iowa =

- November 8, 1966
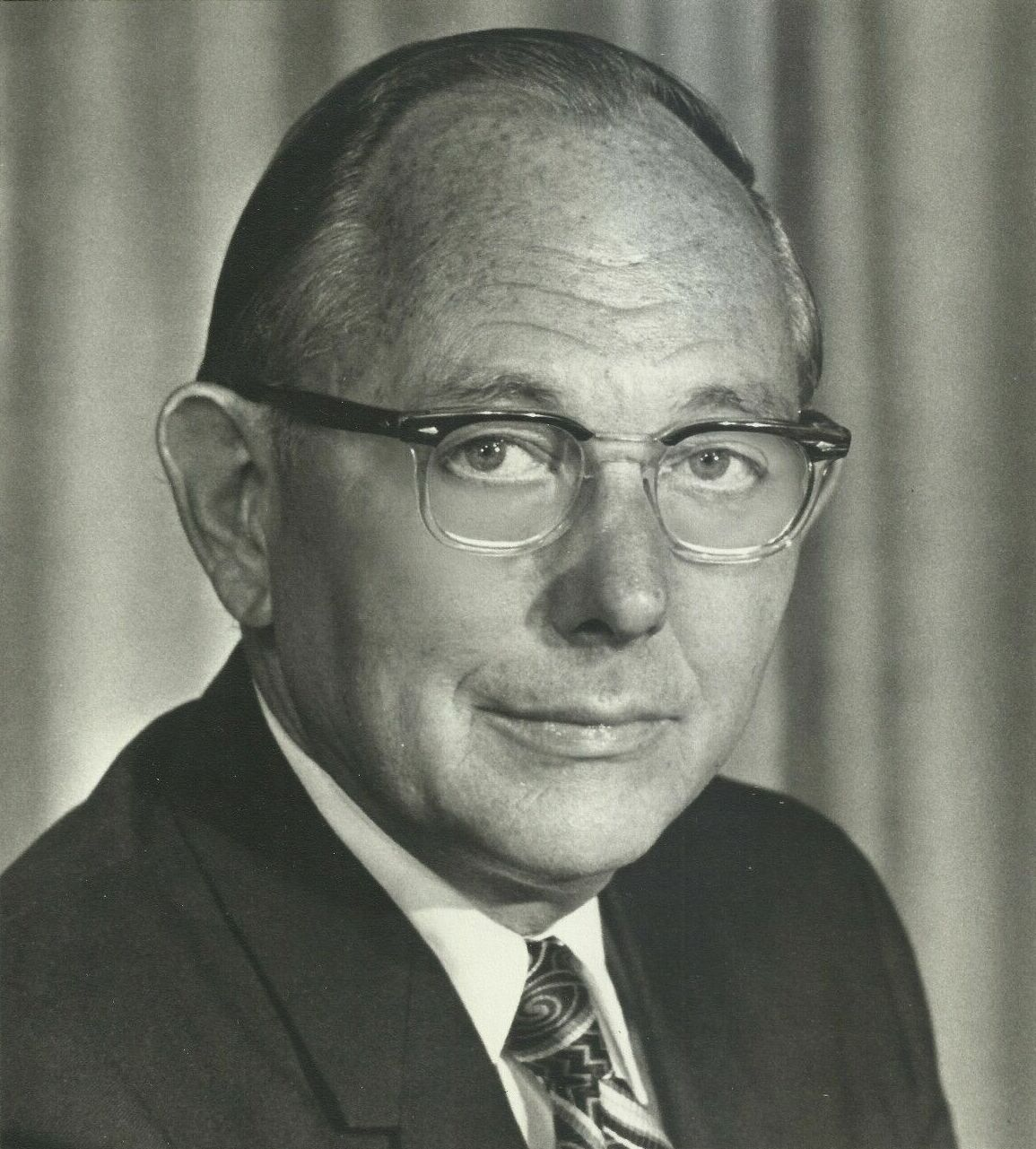

Nominee	Jack Miller	E.B. Smith
Party	Republican	Democratic
Popular vote	522,339	324,114
Percentage	60.92%	37.80%
- County results Miller: 50–60% 60–70% 70–80% 80–90%
U.S. senator before election
Jack Miller
Republican
Elected U.S. Senator
Jack Miller
Republican

The 1966 United States Senate election in Iowa took place on November 8, 1966. Incumbent Republican Senator Jack Miller was re-elected to a second term in office over Democrat E.B. Smith.

After this race, no incumbent would be re-elected to either of Iowa's Senate seats until Chuck Grassley was elected to his second term 20 years later.

== Republican primary ==
=== Candidates ===
- Herbert F. Hoover
- Jack Miller, incumbent Senator since 1961

=== Results ===
1966 Republican Senate primary
Party	Candidate	Votes	%
Republican	Jack Miller (incumbent)	141,141	83.94%
Republican	Herbert F. Hoover	27,007	16.06%
Total votes		168,148	100.00%

Following his loss, Hoover registered to run in the general election as the "Iowa Party" candidate.

== Democratic primary ==
=== Candidates ===
- Gary Cameron
- Robert L. Nereim
- E.B. Smith, Iowa State University history professor and nominee for U.S. Senate in 1962
- Ernest J. Seemann, perennial candidate from Waterloo

=== Results ===
1966 Democratic Senate primary
Party	Candidate	Votes	%
Democratic	E.B. Smith	39,870	50.14%
Democratic	Gary Cameron	22,650	28.49%
Democratic	Ernest J. Seemann	8,646	10.87%
Democratic	Robert L. Nereim	8,343	10.49%
Write-in	All others	2	0.00%
Total votes		79,511	100.00%

== General election ==
=== Results ===
General election results
Party	Candidate	Votes	%	±%
Republican	Jack Miller (incumbent)	522,339	60.92%	▲9.00
Democratic	E.B. Smith	324,114	37.80%	▼10.28
American Constitution	Robert D. Dilley	3,826	0.45%	N/A
Peace Independent	Fred R. Benton	3,050	0.10%	N/A
Iowa	Herbert F. Hoover	2,085	0.24%	N/A
National Prohibition	Verne Higens	2,081	0.24%	N/A
Write-in	All others	1	0.00%	N/A
Total votes		857,496	100.00%	

== See also ==
- 1966 United States Senate elections
