= Elbert B. Smith =

American historian and author

E. B. Smith (1921–2013) was an American historian and author, noted for his works on the history of Antebellum American politics.

== Early life ==
Elbert Benjamin Smith was born in Benham, Kentucky, on May 1, 1921. In 1940, he received his bachelor's degree from Maryville College in Tennessee. He served in the United States Navy as a deck officer during World War II. After the war, Smith attended the University of Chicago, where he received his master's degree in 1947 and his doctorate in 1949. He died on April 30, 2013, in Harwood, Maryland.

== Academic career ==
Smith taught at Youngstown State University, Iowa State University, and the University of Wisconsin.

Smith taught as a Fulbright Professor on numerous occasions. He taught United States history in Japan, at Ochanomizu University and the University of Tokyo from 1954 to 1955. In 1976, he taught a pioneering, uncensored American history course at Moscow State University, returning to the Soviet Union to teach at Moscow in 1982 and at what was then known as Leningrad State University in 1991. He also taught as an exchange professor at the University of Beijing in 1983 and 1988. Smith later served as president of the Fulbright Association.

In 1968, Smith joined the faculty of the Department of History at the University of Maryland. He wrote well-received biographies of Missouri Senator Thomas Hart Benton, presidents James Buchanan, Zachary Taylor, and Millard Fillmore, and Maryland politico Francis Preston Blair. He retired as professor emeritus in 1990.

== Political pursuits ==
Smith ran unsuccessfully as the Democratic challenger to Republican incumbent United States Senator Bourke B. Hickenlooper of Iowa in 1962. Smith received an endorsement from President John F. Kennedy and among his campaign workers was future U.S. Senator Tom Harkin. Nevertheless, he was narrowly defeated. Smith served as Lyndon B. Johnson's Iowa campaign manager in 1964, and ran again for Senate as the Democratic challenger to Jack Miller in 1966. He was later appointed by President Jimmy Carter to the U.S. Foreign Scholarship Board.

== See also ==
Smith's Fulbright activities were extensively detailed in a CIA report included in a March 2025 release of previously redacted JFK assassination records.

== Publications ==
- Magnificent Missourian: The Life of Thomas Hart Benton (1958)
- The Death of Slavery: The United States, 1837–65 (1967)
- The Presidency of James Buchanan (1975)
- Francis Preston Blair: A Biography (1980)
- The Presidencies of Zachary Taylor and Millard Fillimore (1988)
- President Zachary Taylor: The Hero President (2010)

Party political offices
Preceded by R. M. Evans	Democratic nominee for U.S. Senator from Iowa (Class 3); 1962	Succeeded by Harold Hughes
Preceded by Herschel C. Loveless	Democratic nominee for U.S. Senator from Iowa (Class 2); 1966	Succeeded by Dick Clark
