= 1962 United States Senate election in Iowa =

- November 6, 1962
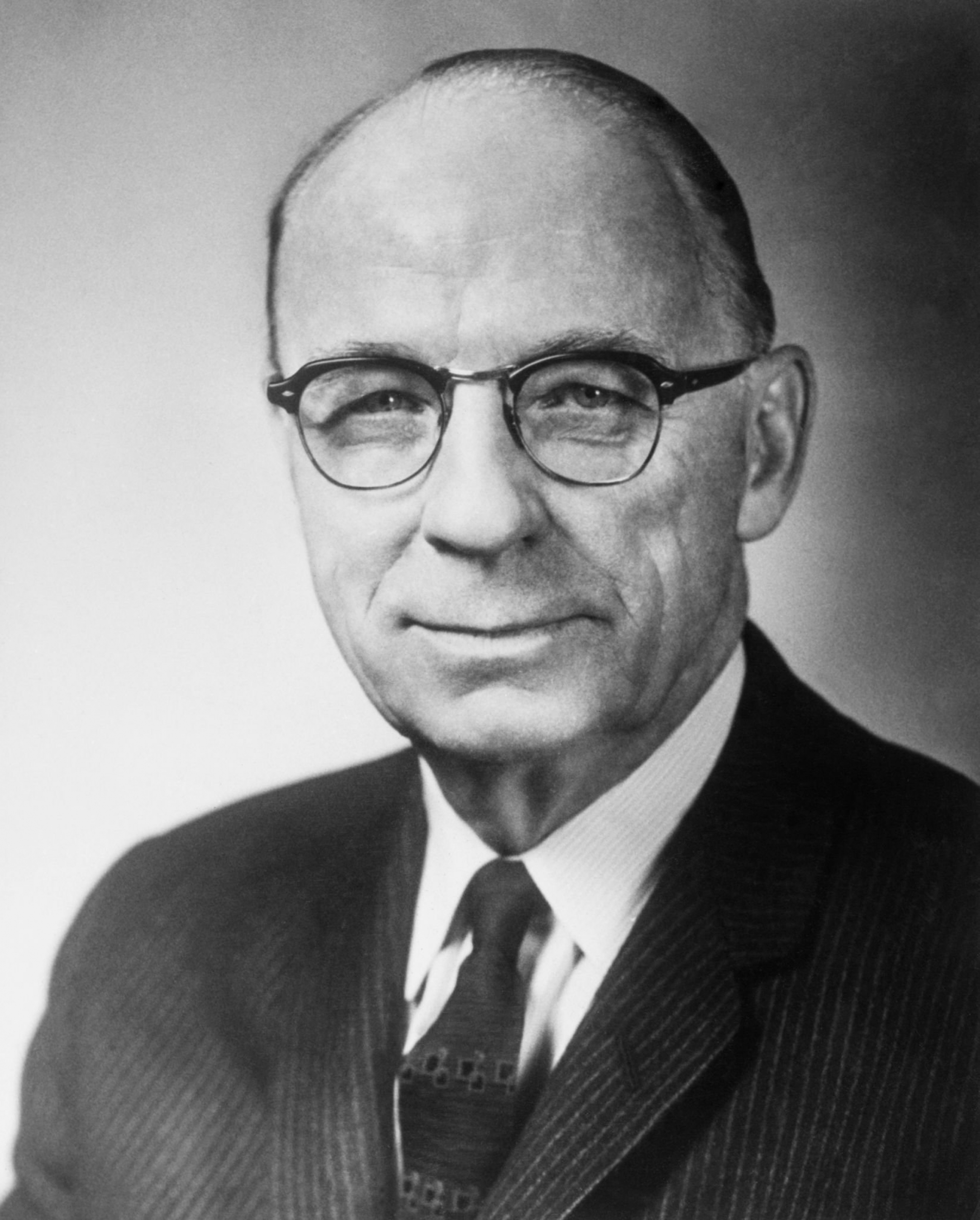

Nominee	Bourke B. Hickenlooper	E.B. Smith
Party	Republican	Democratic
Popular vote	431,364	376,602
Percentage	53.39%	46.61%
- County results Hickenlooper: 50–60% 60–70% 70–80% Smith: 50–60% 60–70% Tie: 50%
U.S. senator before election
Bourke B. Hickenlooper
Republican
Elected U.S. Senator
Bourke B. Hickenlooper
Republican

The 1962 United States Senate election in Iowa took place on November 6, 1962. Incumbent Republican Senator Bourke B. Hickenlooper was re-elected to a fourth term in office over Democrat E.B. Smith.

== Republican primary ==
=== Candidates ===
- Herbert F. Hoover
- Bourke B. Hickenlooper, incumbent Senator since 1945

=== Results ===
1962 Republican Senate primary
Party	Candidate	Votes	%
Republican	Bourke B. Hickenlooper (incumbent)	164,535	85.41%
Republican	Herbert F. Hoover	28,095	14.59%
Write-in		2	0.00%
Total votes		192,632	100.00%

== Democratic primary ==
=== Candidates ===
- E.B. Smith, Iowa State University history professor

=== Results ===
1962 Democratic Senate primary
Party	Candidate	Votes	%
Democratic	E.B. Smith	71,395	100.00%
Write-in		2	0.00%
Total votes		71,397	100.00%

== General election ==
=== Results ===
General election results
Party	Candidate	Votes	%	±%
Republican	Bourke B. Hickenlooper (incumbent)	431,364	53.39%	▼0.53
Democratic	E.B. Smith	376,602	46.61%	▲0.53
Total votes		807,966	100.00%	

== See also ==
- 1962 United States Senate elections
