= Treaty Powers Resolution =

Treaty Powers Resolution was a bill proposed by Senator Dick Clark in 1976, which was intended to limit the power of the President of the United States to make executive agreements with foreign nations. Under this bill, the Senate would have the power to reject any international agreement that was implemented through an executive order, even if the agreement is not classified as a treaty by the President.

Although the proposal was approved from the Senate of Foreign Relations Committee in 1978, it was soon replaced by a weaker proposal by Senator John Glenn.
