= 1984 United States Senate election in Iowa =

- November 6, 1984
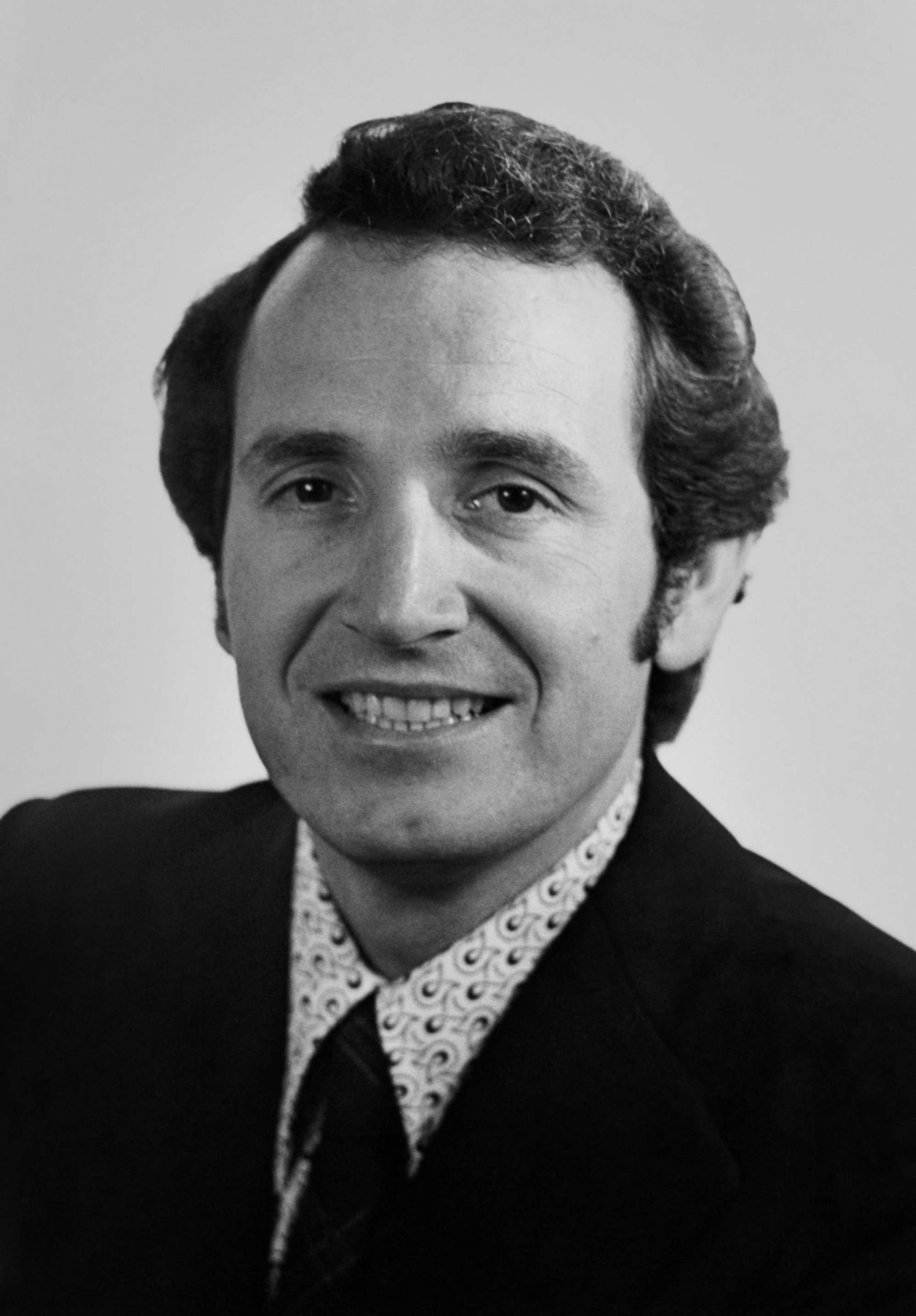

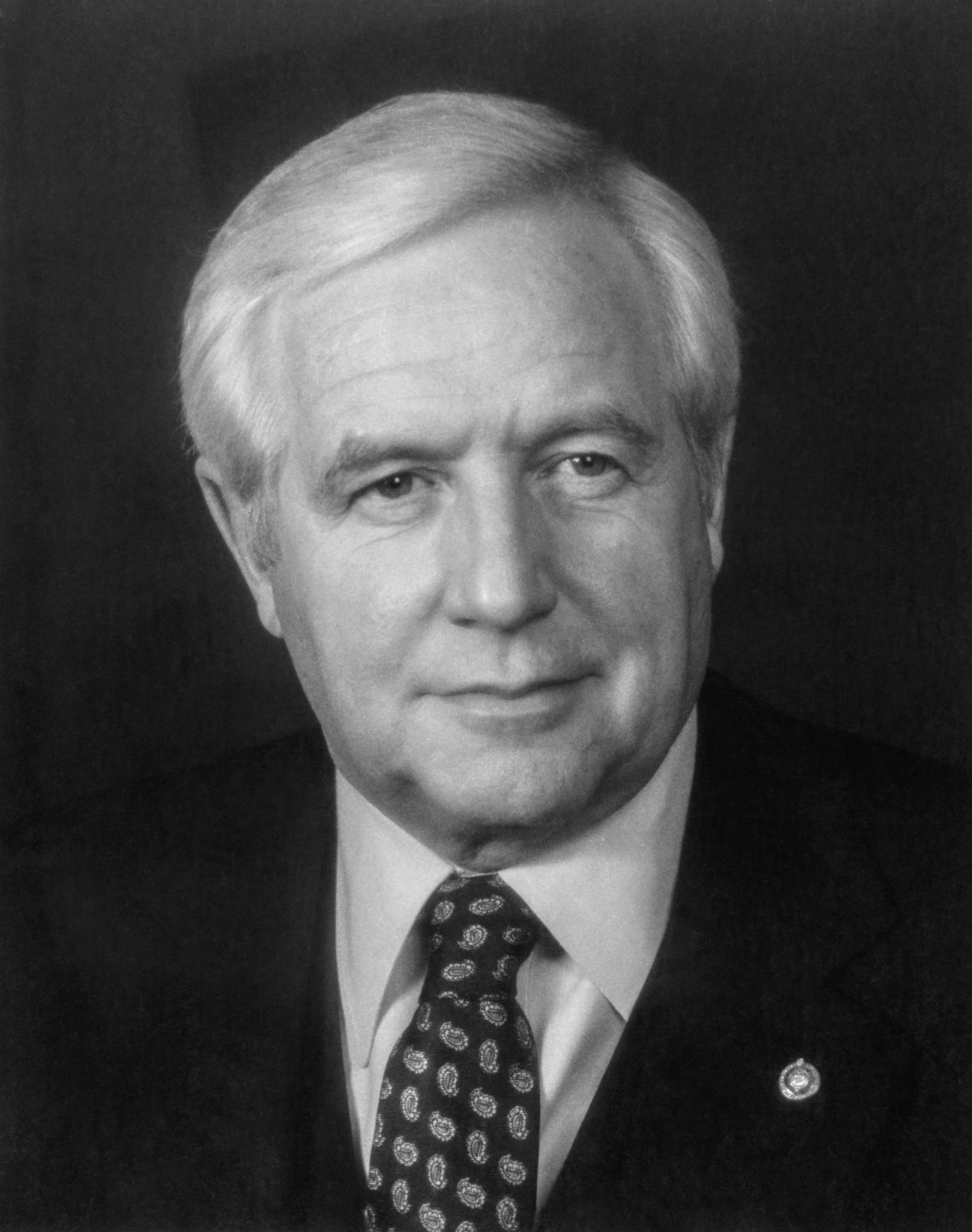
Nominee	Tom Harkin	Roger Jepsen
Party	Democratic	Republican
Popular vote	716,883	564,381
Percentage	55.46%	43.66%
- County results Harkin: 40–50% 50–60% 60–70% Jepsen: 40–50% 50–60% 60–70% 70–80%
U.S. senator before election
Roger Jepsen
Republican
Elected U.S. Senator
Tom Harkin
Democratic

The 1984 United States Senate election in Iowa was held on November 6, 1984. Incumbent Republican Senator Roger Jepsen ran for re-election to a second term in office. Jepsen was opposed by U.S. Representative Tom Harkin, from Iowa's 5th congressional district, who won the Democratic primary uncontested.

The general election was full of mudslinging and personal attacks, including the embellishment by both candidates of their military records; Harkin attacked Jepsen for failing to keep his promise to not sell AWACS aircraft to Saudi Arabia. Ultimately, Harkin defeated Jepsen in a landslide 152,502 votes, winning the first of five terms in the Senate. This is the last time that a Senator from Iowa lost re-election.

== Democratic primary ==
=== Candidates ===
- Tom Harkin, United States Congressman from Iowa's 5th congressional district

=== Results ===
Democratic primary results
Party	Candidate	Votes	%
Democratic	Tom Harkin	106,005	99.93%
Democratic	Write-ins	70	0.07%
Total votes		106,075	100.00%

== Republican primary ==
=== Candidates ===
- Roger Jepsen, incumbent U.S. Senator

=== Results ===
Republican primary results
Party	Candidate	Votes	%
Republican	Roger Jepsen (incumbent)	113,996	99.87%
Republican	Write-ins	147	0.13%
Total votes		114,143	100.00%

== General election ==
=== Results ===
United States Senate election in Iowa, 1984
Party	Candidate	Votes	%	±%
Democratic	Tom Harkin	716,883	55.46%	+7.54%
Republican	Roger Jepsen (incumbent)	564,381	43.66%	−7.47%
Independent	Garry De Young	11,014	0.85%	
Write-in		422	0.03%	
Majority		152,502	11.80%	+8.58%
Turnout		1,292,700		
Democratic gain from Republican		Swing		

== See also ==
- 1984 United States Senate elections
