= 1978 United States Senate election in Iowa =

- November 7, 1978
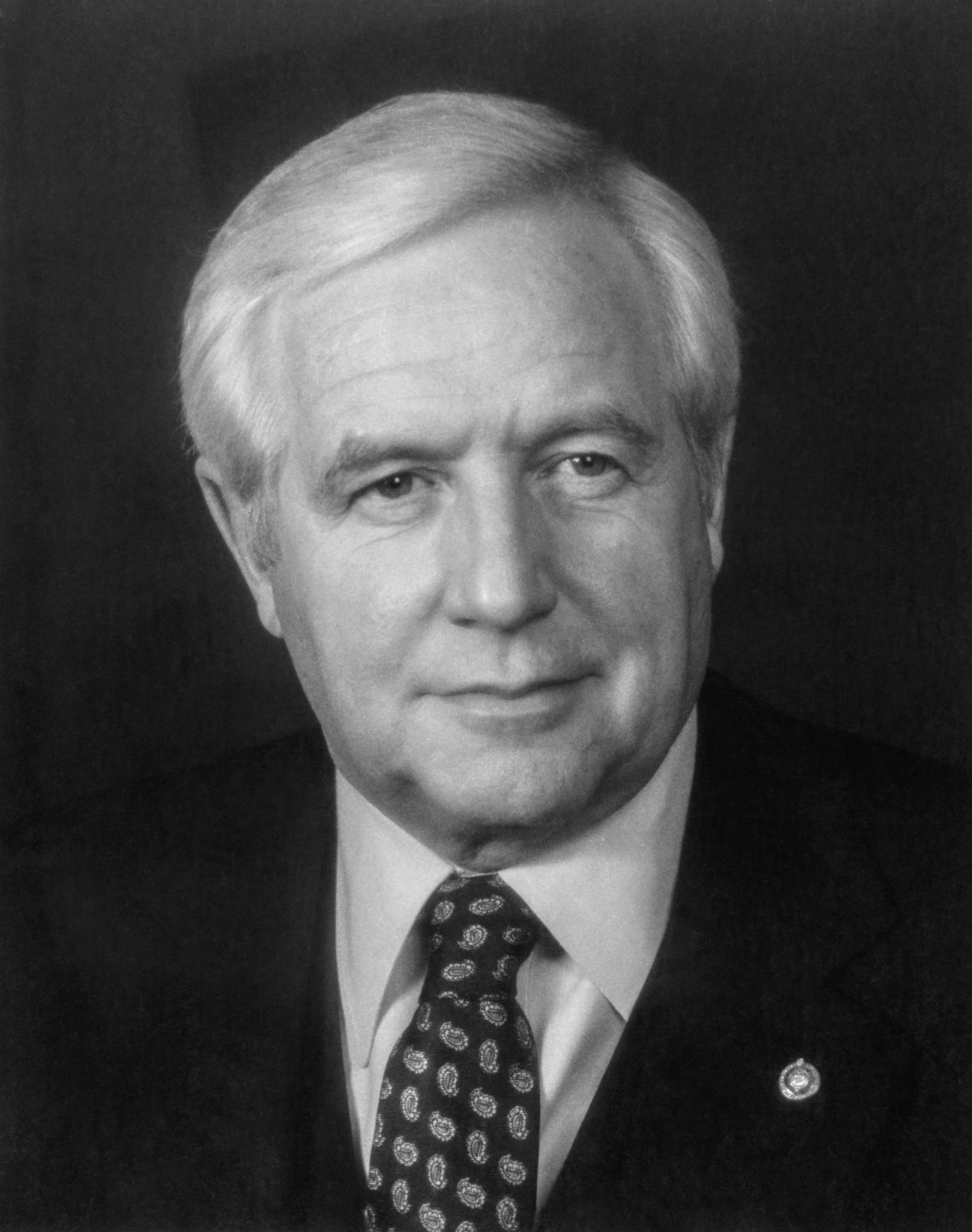

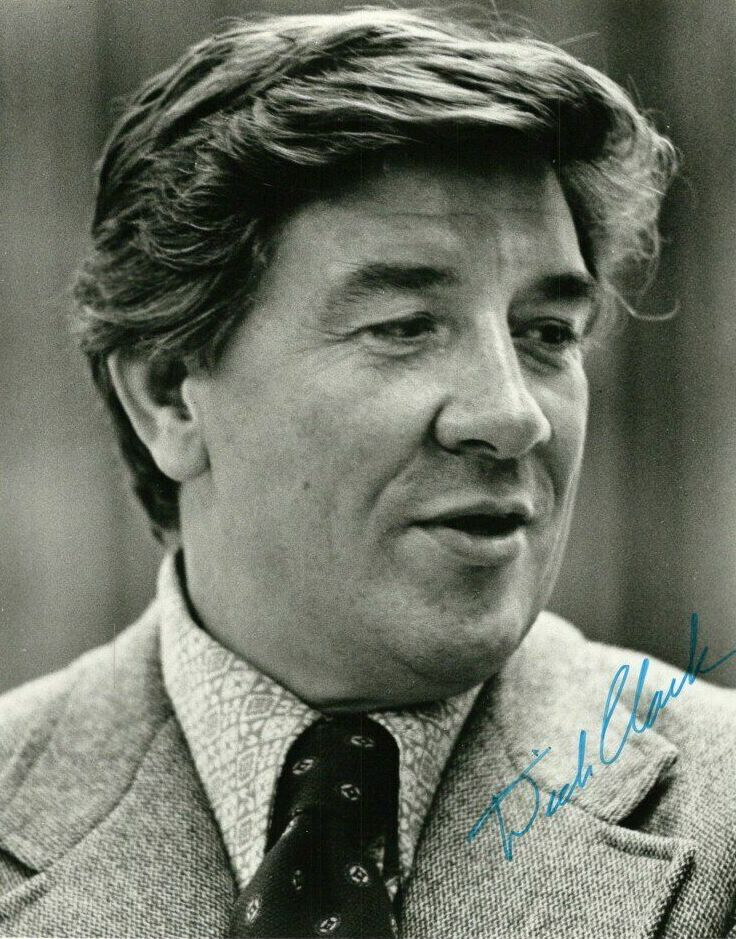
Nominee	Roger Jepsen	Dick Clark
Party	Republican	Democratic
Popular vote	421,598	395,066
Percentage	51.12%	47.91%
- County results Jepsen: 40–50% 50–60% 60–70% 70–80% Clark: 40–50% 50–60% 60–70%
U.S. senator before election
Dick Clark
Democratic
Elected U.S. Senator
Roger Jepsen
Republican

The 1978 United States Senate election in Iowa took place on November 7, 1978. Incumbent Democratic Senator Dick Clark ran for re-election to a second term but was defeated by Republican former Lieutenant Governor Roger Jepsen. This was the last time until 2014 that a Republican would win Iowa's Class II Senate seat.

== Democratic primary ==
=== Candidates ===
- Gerald Leo Baker, computer programmer and mathematician from Cedar Falls
- Dick Clark, incumbent Senator
- Robert L. Nereim, resident of Des Moines and candidate for Senate in 1966

=== Results ===
1978 Democratic Senate primary
Party	Candidate	Votes	%
Democratic	Dick Clark (incumbent)	87,880	80.48%
Democratic	Gerald Leo Baker	13,132	12.03%
Democratic	Robert L. Nereim	8,176	7.49%
Write-in	All others	3	0.00%
Total votes		109,191	100.00%

Following his defeat, Gerald Leo Baker announced an independent campaign for the general election.

== Republican primary ==
=== Candidates ===
- Joe Bertroche
- Roger Jepsen, former Lieutenant Governor of Iowa
- Maurice Van Nostrand, Chairman of the State Commerce Commission

=== Results ===
1978 Republican Senate primary
Party	Candidate	Votes	%
Republican	Roger Jepsen	87,397	57.33%
Republican	Maurice Van Nostrand	54,189	35.55%
Republican	Joe Bertroche	10,860	7.12%
Total votes		284,047	100.00%

== General election ==
=== Results ===
General election results
Party	Candidate	Votes	%	±%
Republican	Roger Jepsen	421,598	51.12%	▲7.03
Democratic	Dick Clark (incumbent)	395,066	47.91%	▼7.16
Independent	Gerald Leo Baker	4,223	0.51%	N/A
Libertarian	Ben L. Olson	3,689	0.45%	N/A
Write-in	All others	78	0.01%	N/A
Total votes		824,654	100.00%	
Republican gain from Democratic		Swing		

== See also ==
- 1978 United States Senate elections
