= 1960 United States Senate election in Iowa =

- November 8, 1960
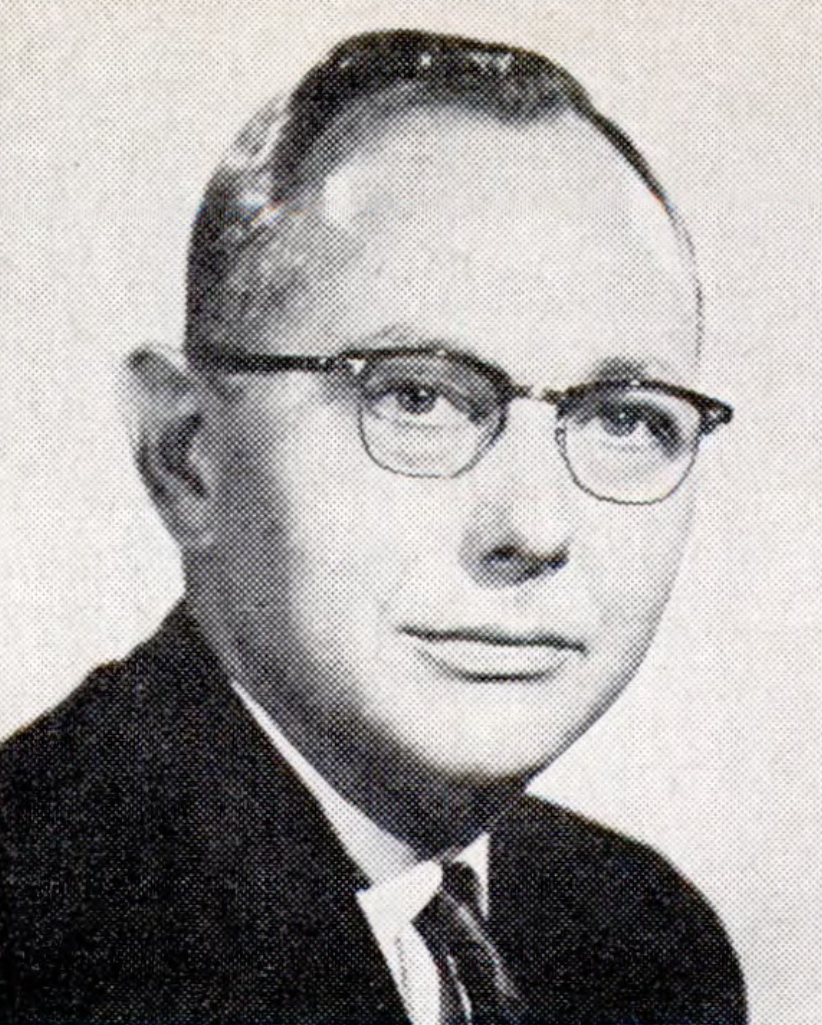

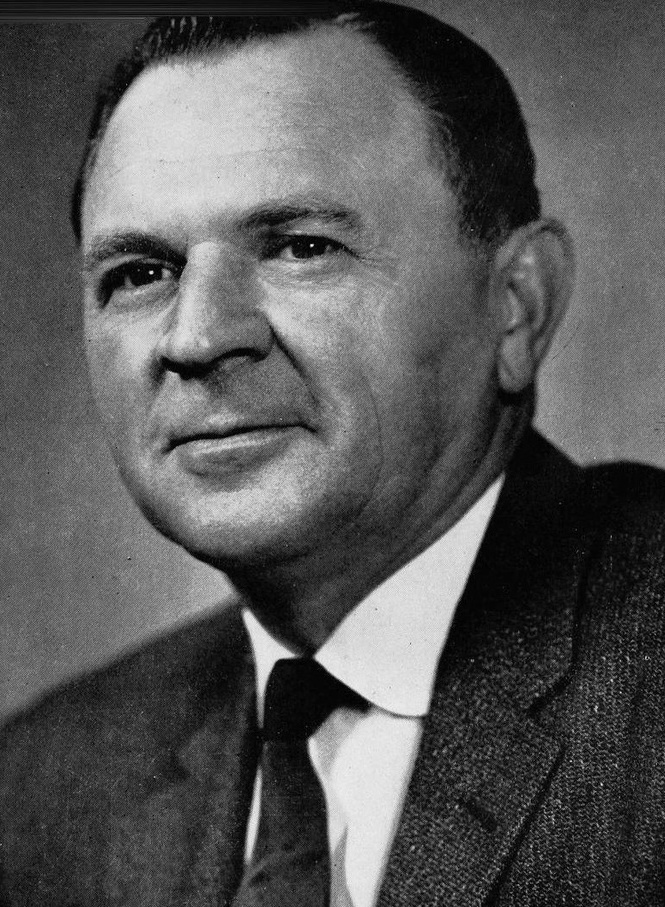
Nominee	Jack Miller	Herschel Loveless
Party	Republican	Democratic
Popular vote	642,643	595,119
Percentage	51.92%	48.08%
- County results Miller: 50–60% 60–70% 70–80% Loveless: 50–60% 60–70%
U.S. senator before election
Thomas E. Martin
Republican
Elected U.S. Senator
Jack Miller
Republican

The 1960 United States Senate election in Iowa took place on November 8, 1960. Incumbent Republican Senator Thomas E. Martin did not run for re-election to a second term. Jack Miller won the open seat by defeating Democratic Governor Herschel Loveless.

== Republican primary ==
=== Candidates ===
- Rollo Bergeson, former Iowa Secretary of State (1946–49)
- Dayton Countryman, former Iowa Attorney General (1955–57) and candidate for Senate in 1956
- Jack Miller, State Senator from Sioux City
- Ernest Seemann, perennial candidate
- Kenneth Stringer
- Oliver Reeve

=== Results ===
1960 Republican Senate primary
Party	Candidate	Votes	%
Republican	Jack Miller	66,455	30.80%
Republican	Dayton Countryman	62,500	28.96%
Republican	Rollo Bergeson	31,559	14.63%
Republican	Kenneth Stringer	29,927	13.87%
Republican	Oliver Reeve	14,414	6.68%
Republican	Ernest J. Seemann	10,931	5.07%
Total votes		215,786	100.00%

Miller was formally nominated at a party convention.

== General election ==
=== Results ===
1960 U.S. Senate election in Iowa
Party	Candidate	Votes	%	±%
Republican	Jack Miller	642,643	51.92%	▼0.29
Democratic	Herschel Loveless	595,119	48.08%	▲0.55
Total votes		1,237,762	100.00%	

== See also ==
- 1960 United States Senate elections
