= 1972 United States Senate election in Iowa =

- November 7, 1972
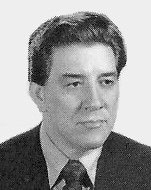

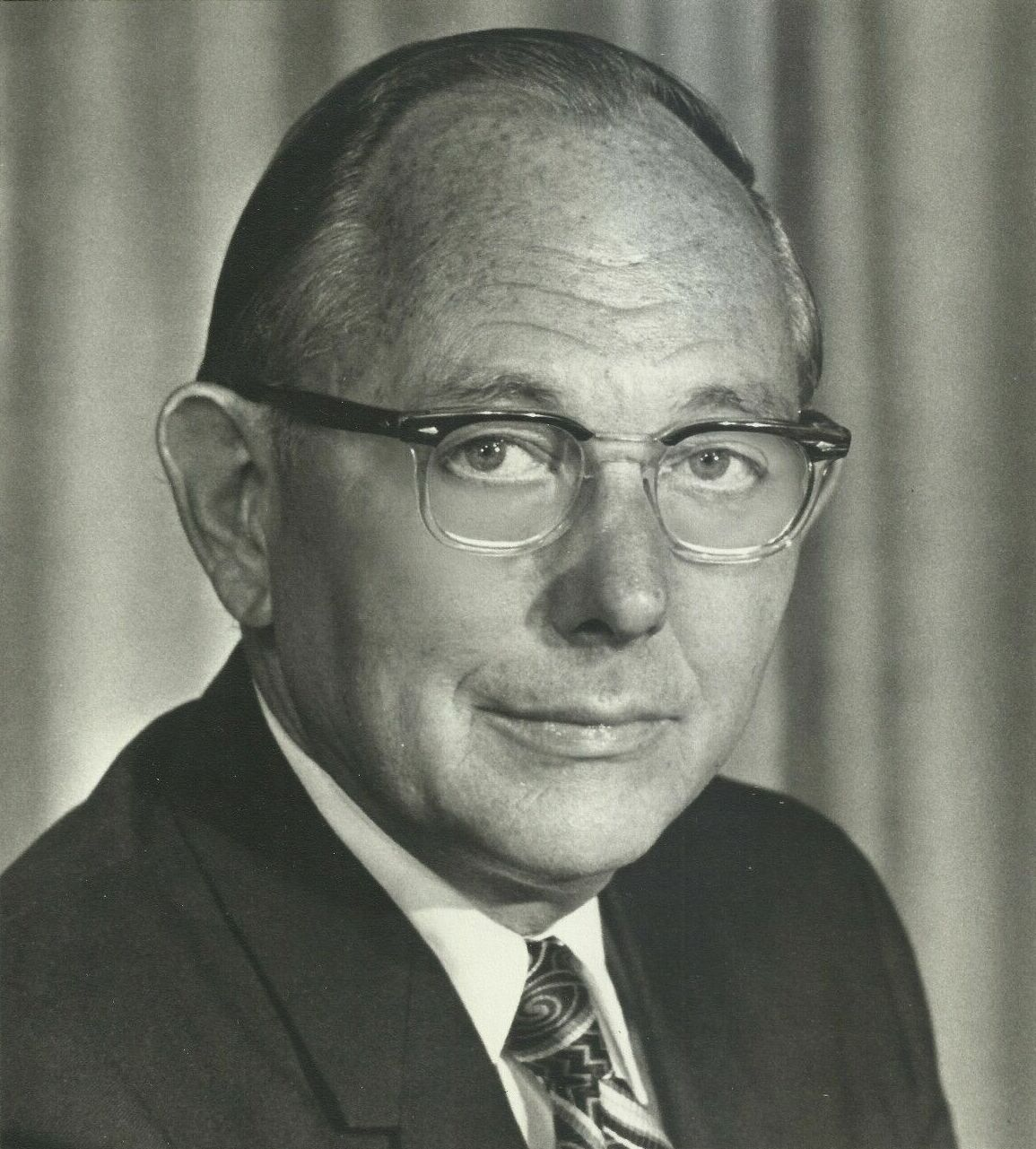
Nominee	Dick Clark	Jack Miller
Party	Democratic	Republican
Popular vote	662,637	530,525
Percentage	55.07%	44.09%
- County results Clark: 50–60% 60–70% 70–80% Miller: 50–60% 60–70%
U.S. senator before election
Jack Miller
Republican
Elected U.S. Senator
Dick Clark
Democratic

The 1972 United States Senate election in Iowa took place on November 7, 1972. Incumbent Republican U.S. Senator Jack Miller ran for re-election to a third term, but was defeated by Democrat Dick Clark. Iowa was one of fifteen states, alongside Alabama, Arkansas, Colorado, Delaware, Georgia, Louisiana, Maine, Minnesota, Mississippi, Montana, New Hampshire, Rhode Island, South Dakota and West Virginia, that were won by Republican president Richard Nixon in 1972 that elected Democrats to the United States Senate.

== Republican primary ==
=== Candidates ===
- Jack Miller, incumbent senator since 1961
- Ralph Scott

=== Results ===
1972 Republican Senate primary
Party	Candidate	Votes	%
Republican	Jack Miller (incumbent)	170,590	84.36%
Republican	Ralph Scott	31,607	15.63%
Republican	All others	11	0.01%
Total votes		202,208	100.00%

== General election ==
=== Results ===
General election results
Party	Candidate	Votes	%	±%
Democratic	Dick Clark	662,637	55.07%	▲17.27
Republican	Jack Miller (incumbent)	530,525	44.09%	▼16.82
American	William A. Rocap, Jr.	8,954	0.74%	N/A
Independent	Fred R. Benton	1,203	0.10%	N/A
Write-in		14	0.00%	N/A
Total votes		1,203,333	100.00%	N/A
Democratic gain from Republican				

== See also ==
- 1972 United States Senate elections
