= Dick Clark (Iowa politician) =

American politician (1928–2023)

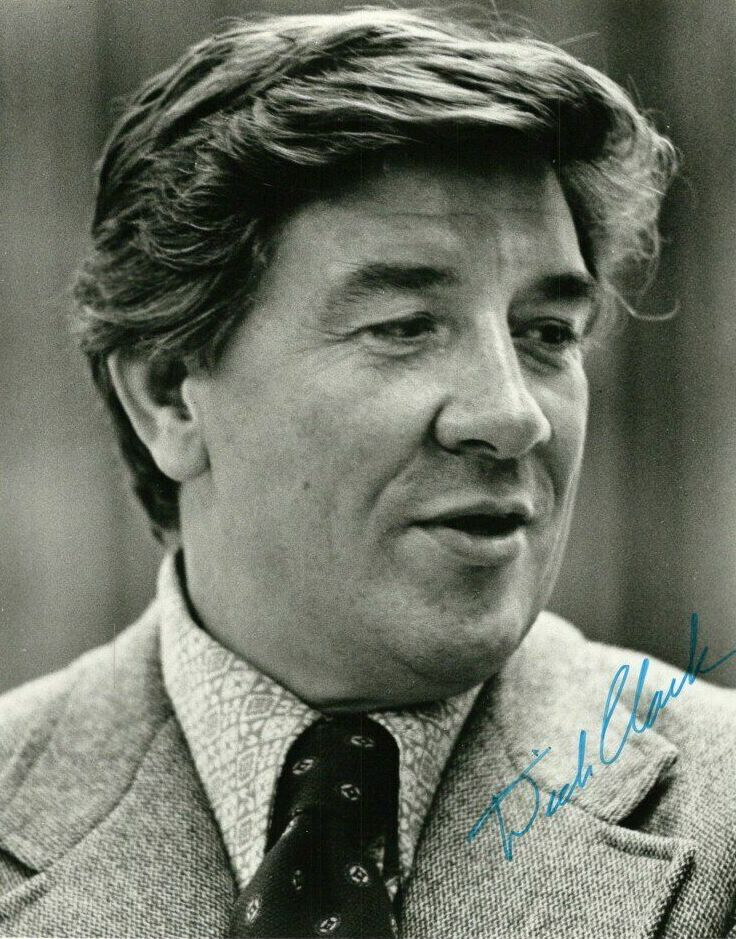
- Clark in the 1970s

United States Senator from Iowa
- In office January 3, 1973 – January 3, 1979
- Preceded by: Jack Miller
- Succeeded by: Roger Jepsen

Personal details
- Born: Richard Clarence Clark; September 14, 1928 Paris, Iowa, U.S.
- Died: September 20, 2023 (aged 95) Washington, D.C., U.S.
- Party: Democratic
- Spouse(s): Jean Shirley Gross (m. 1954; div. 1976) Julie Kennett (m. 1977)
- Children: 2

Military service
- Branch/service: United States Army
- Years of service: 1950–1952

Richard Clarence Clark (September 14, 1928 – September 20, 2023) was an American politician from Iowa who served as a member of the United States Senate for one term from 1973 to 1979. He was a member of the Democratic Party. After he left the United States Senate, Clark was known for a major role in helping refugees of the Vietnam War.

== Early life ==
Richard Clarence Clark was born on September 14, 1928, in Paris, Iowa, an unincorporated community in Linn County, Iowa to Clarence Clark and the former Bernice Andersen, who owned a grocery store near the village of Lamont, Iowa, where they moved to when Dick was young. He was of German and English descent. Clark attended public schools. He graduated from Lamont High School in 1947 and enlisted in the United States Army, serving in Europe during the Korean War. Clark was educated at the University of Maryland Global Campus in Wiesbaden and Goethe University Frankfurt from 1950 to 1952 during his military service. He completed his BA in 1953 at Upper Iowa University and his Master's in 1956 at the University of Iowa. He then became a professor at Upper Iowa University and a Democratic Party volunteer, working to collect names, addresses, and phone numbers of party members with the goal of contacting them on election day to get them to the polls. This resulted in Democratic victories in an otherwise Republican area.

This caught the attention of attorney John Culver of Cedar Rapids, Iowa, who enlisted Clark to help run his congressional campaign in 1964. After their victory, Clark became Culver's administrative assistant, and the pair modernized the Iowa Democratic Party's grassroots efforts in the state, building up a sophisticated voter turnout organization that progressed from names on index cards to computerized databases.

In 1971, Culver was contemplating running for the U.S. Senate. He dispatched Clark to travel the state to set up infrastructure for a potential campaign. But in early 1972, Culver decided that defeating entrenched incumbent Republican Senator Jack Miller was impossible and bowed out of the race. With the infrastructure set up and no other Democratic candidate in the race, Clark entered it himself.

== U.S. Senate ==
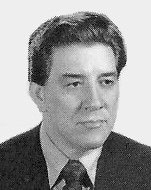
Clark in 1972

Throughout the campaign, polls showed Clark trailing Miller by lopsided margins. A critical part of Clark's campaign was his 1,300-mile (2,100 km) walk across the state to gain publicity. He won in an upset, with 662,637 votes (55%) to Miller's 530,525 (44%). American Independent Party candidate William Rocap received 8,954 votes (1%). In 1974, Clark was joined by Culver, his former boss, who rode to victory because of the Republican Party's unpopularity in the wake of the Watergate scandal.

=== Voting record ===
Clark was a very liberal senator, consistently ranked among the most liberal during his tenure. He served on the Senate Foreign Relations Committee and chaired the Subcommittee on Africa, developing considerable expertise on the Angolan Civil War. In 1976, he authored the Clark Amendment, which barred aid from the U.S. government to private groups engaged in military or paramilitary operations in Angola.

=== Reelection bid ===
Clark ran for reelection in 1978 against Republican Roger Jepsen, who was lieutenant governor of Iowa from 1969 to 1973. Because of his efforts against the apartheid government in South Africa, Jepsen taunted him as "the Senator from Africa". The South African government channeled $250,000 into the race. In a nationally poor year for Democrats, Clark lost his seat by a narrow margin. President of the United States Jimmy Carter then appointed him to be Ambassador at Large and United States Coordinator for Refugee Affairs in 1979; later that year, Clark resigned from his position to join the presidential campaign of U.S. Senate member Ted Kennedy from Massachusetts, with whom Clark had served in the Senate, against Carter.

=== Committees ===
As a senator, Clark served on the United States Senate Committee on Agriculture, Nutrition, and Forestry, the United States Senate Committee on Environment and Public Works, and the United States Senate Committee on Small Business and Entrepreneurship.

== After the Senate ==
Clark joined the Aspen Institute and in 1983 founded its Congressional Program, which sought to educate members of Congress on foreign affairs issues. Clark also served as U.S. Ambassador-at-large for a refugee crisis related to the Vietnam War.

== Personal life and death ==
Clark was married twice, he first married Jean Shirley Gross in 1954, and they had two children, Julie Mendoza and Thomas Clark. After they divorced in 1976, he then married Julie Kennett, who had one son, Stephen Marshall from a previous marriage, in 1977.

Clark died in his sleep at his home in Washington, D.C. on September 20, 2023, six days after his 95th birthday. He was interred at Quasqueton Cemetery in the village of Quasqueton, Iowa.

== See also ==
- Angolan Civil War
- Clark Amendment
- Treaty Powers Resolution

Party political offices
Preceded by Elbert B. Smith	Democratic nominee for United States Senator from Iowa (Class 2); 1972, 1978	Succeeded by Tom Harkin
U.S. Senate
Preceded by Jack Miller	U.S. senator (Class 2) from Iowa; January 3, 1973 – January 3, 1979; Served alongside: Harold Hughes, John Culver	Succeeded by Roger Jepsen
