= John M. Naughton =

American engineer and politician (1891–1981)

John M. Naughton (3 June 1891 – 31 August 1981) was an American construction engineer and politician.

John M. Naughton's parents Mark and Mary immigrated to the United States from Ireland. John was born in Sioux City, Iowa, on 3 June 1891 and attended schools in his hometown before completing his education at Bancroft School, Loras Academy, St. Joseph High School and the University of South Dakota School of Engineering. After serving in the United States Army Corps of Engineers during World War I, Naughton became a commander of the Disabled American Veterans. He married fellow Sioux City native Florence Davenport in August 1920, with whom he raised four children.

Naughton worked for the Stevens Construction Company, the Arthur Sanford Company and the Tangney–McGinn Hotel Corporation as a construction supervisor. On the advice of United States Senator Guy Gillette, U. S. President Franklin D. Roosevelt appointed Naughton to lead the Works Progress Administration in Iowa. Between 1957 and 1961, Naughton was a Democratic member of the Iowa House of Representatives for District 58. In later life, Naughton moved to a nursing home in Adel, Iowa, where he died on 31 August 1981.
