= Roger Jepsen =

American politician (1928–2020)

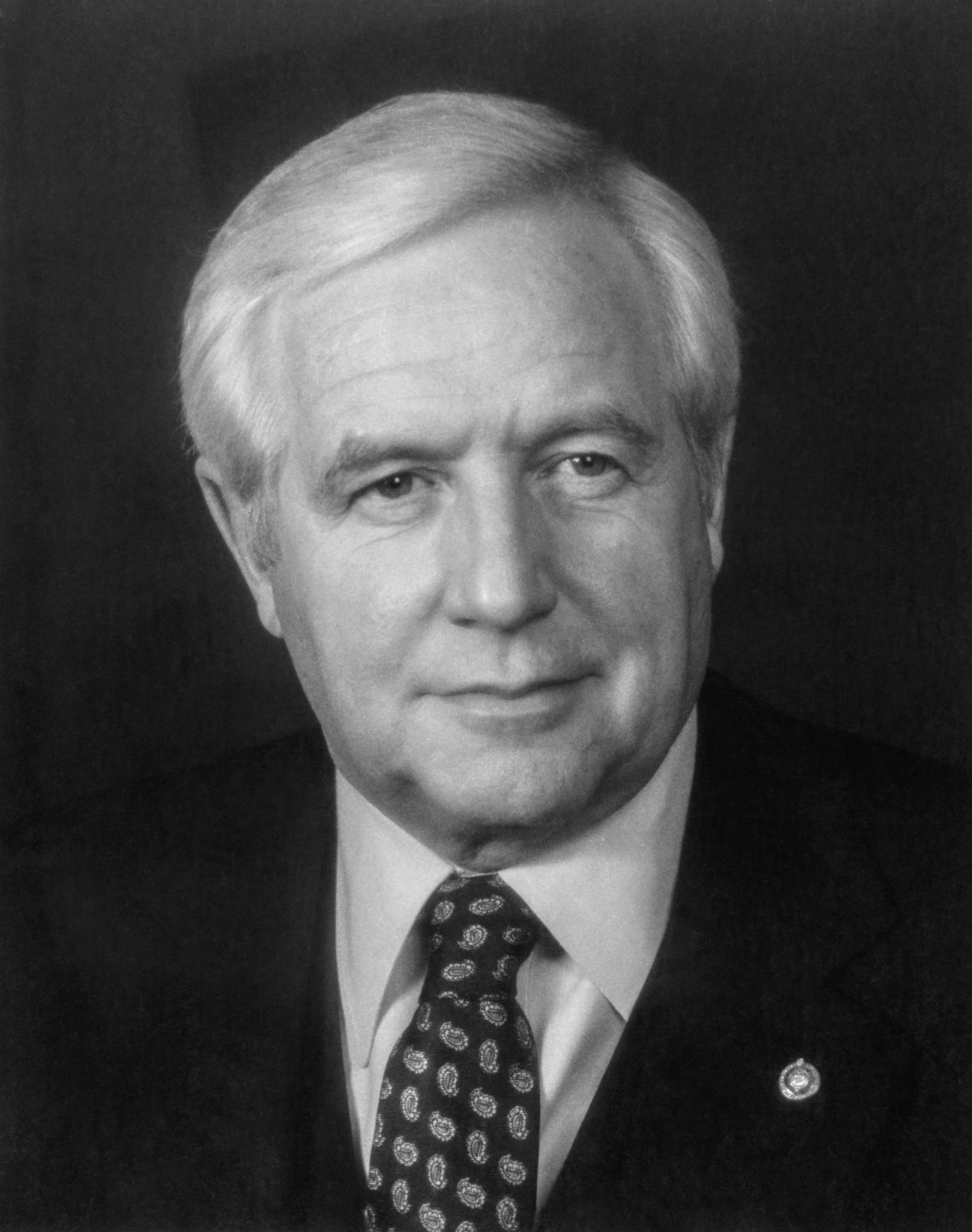
- Jepsen in 1983

United States Senator from Iowa
- In office January 3, 1979 – January 3, 1985
- Preceded by: Dick Clark
- Succeeded by: Tom Harkin

38th Lieutenant Governor of Iowa
- In office January 16, 1969 – January 18, 1973
- Governor: Robert D. Ray
- Preceded by: Robert D. Fulton
- Succeeded by: Arthur Neu

10th Chair of the National Lieutenant Governors Association
- In office 1971–1972
- Preceded by: George Nigh
- Succeeded by: Thomas Lee Judge

Member of the Iowa Senate
- In office January 9, 1967 – January 12, 1969
- Constituency: 15th District

Personal details
- Born: Roger William Jepsen; December 23, 1928 Cedar Falls, Iowa, U.S.
- Died: November 13, 2020 (aged 91) Bettendorf, Iowa, U.S.
- Party: Republican
- Spouse(s): Dorothy Ann Lambertson (m. 1948, divorced) Dee Ann Delaney (m. 1958)
- Children: 5
- Education: Arizona State University

Military service
- Branch/service: United States Army
- Years of service: 1946–1947; 1948–1960

Roger William Jepsen (December 23, 1928 – November 13, 2020) was an American politician from Iowa. A member of the Republican Party, he served as Lieutenant Governor of Iowa from 1969 to 1973 and a member of the United States Senate for one term from 1979 to 1985. Jepsen later was the chairman of National Credit Union Administration from 1985 to 1993 where he helped oversee more than 14,000 credit unions nationally.

== Early life ==
Jepsen was born on December 23, 1928, in Cedar Falls, Iowa, the son of Emil Jepsen and the former Esther Sorensen. His grandparents were all Danish immigrants. Jepsen attended public schools.

Jepsen attended University of Northern Iowa, later graduating from Arizona State University in 1950 with a bachelor's degree and in 1953 with a master's degree. At ASU, Jepsen was a member of the Tau Kappa Epsilon fraternity.

== Career ==
Jepsen served as a paratrooper in the United States Army from 1946 to 1947 and in the United States Army Reserve from 1948 to 1960, where he achieved the rank of captain. He was active in the farming, insurance and health care businesses.

Jepsen served as a county supervisor of Scott County, Iowa, from 1962 to 1965 and was a member of the Iowa Senate from 1967 to 1969. He was the 39th Lieutenant Governor of Iowa from 1969 to 1973, having been elected with Governor Robert D. Ray in 1968.

In 1978, he was elected to the United States Senate, narrowly defeating incumbent Dick Clark in a major upset, receiving strong support from National Conservative Political Action Committee (NCPAC). During the campaign, Jepsen taunted Senator Clark as "the Senator from Africa" because of Clark's work on behalf of the people in South Africa against their apartheid government. He served a single term from January 3, 1979, to January 3, 1985. He served as co-chairman of the United States Congressional Joint Economic Committee in the 98th Congress.

Fellow Republican colleagues praised Jepsen for persuading then-U.S. President Ronald Reagan to lift the agricultural ban against the Soviet Union.

Jepsen was defeated by Democratic U.S. Representative Tom Harkin in the 1984 Senate election as it emerged that Jepsen had been cited for DWI in Washington, D.C. and had visited a brothel in Iowa. Jepsen later served as chairman of the National Credit Union Administration.

During part of his tenure in the Senate, Jepsen sat at the Candy Desk.

== Personal life and death ==
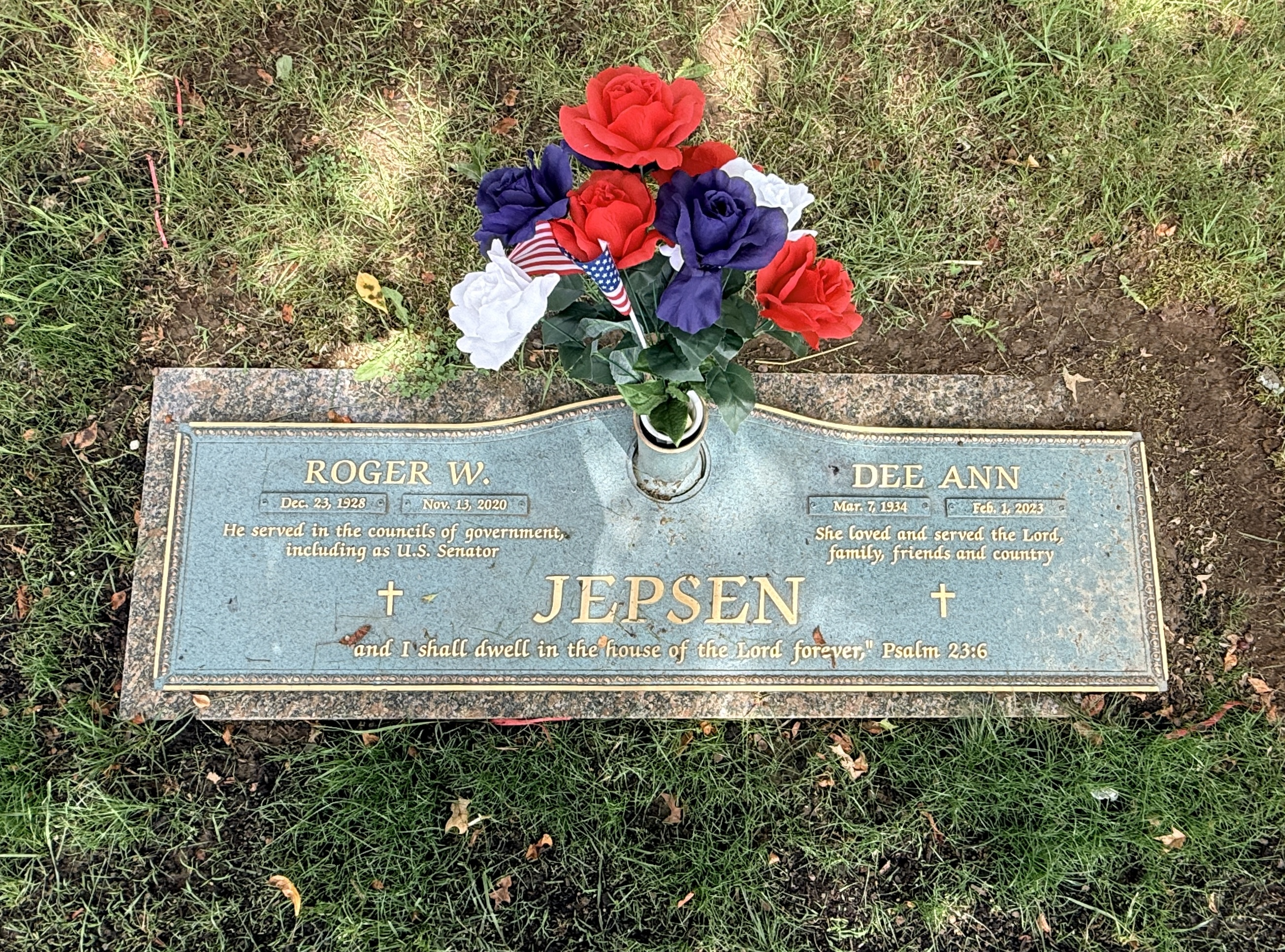
Roger Jepsen's grave in Davenport Memorial Park

Jepsen married twice, first to Dorothy Ann Lambertson in 1948, they had four children. The marriage ended in divorce. He then married Dee Ann Delaney in 1958 and they had one son together.

Jepsen died on November 13, 2020, at the Clarissa C. Cook Hospice House in Bettendorf, Iowa, at age 91. He was interred at Davenport Memorial Park in Davenport, Iowa.

Party political offices
Preceded by Max Milo Mills	Republican Party nominee for Lieutenant Governor of Iowa; 1968, 1970	Succeeded by Arthur Neu
Preceded by Jack Miller	Republican nominee for U.S. Senator from Iowa (Class 2); 1978, 1984	Succeeded by Tom Tauke
Political offices
Preceded by Robert D. Fulton	Lieutenant Governor of Iowa; 1969–1973	Succeeded by Arthur A. Neu
U.S. Senate
Preceded by Dick Clark	U.S. senator (Class 2) from Iowa; 1979–1985; Served alongside: John Culver, Chuck Grassley	Succeeded by Tom Harkin
