= Bob Vander Plaats =

American politician and conservative activist

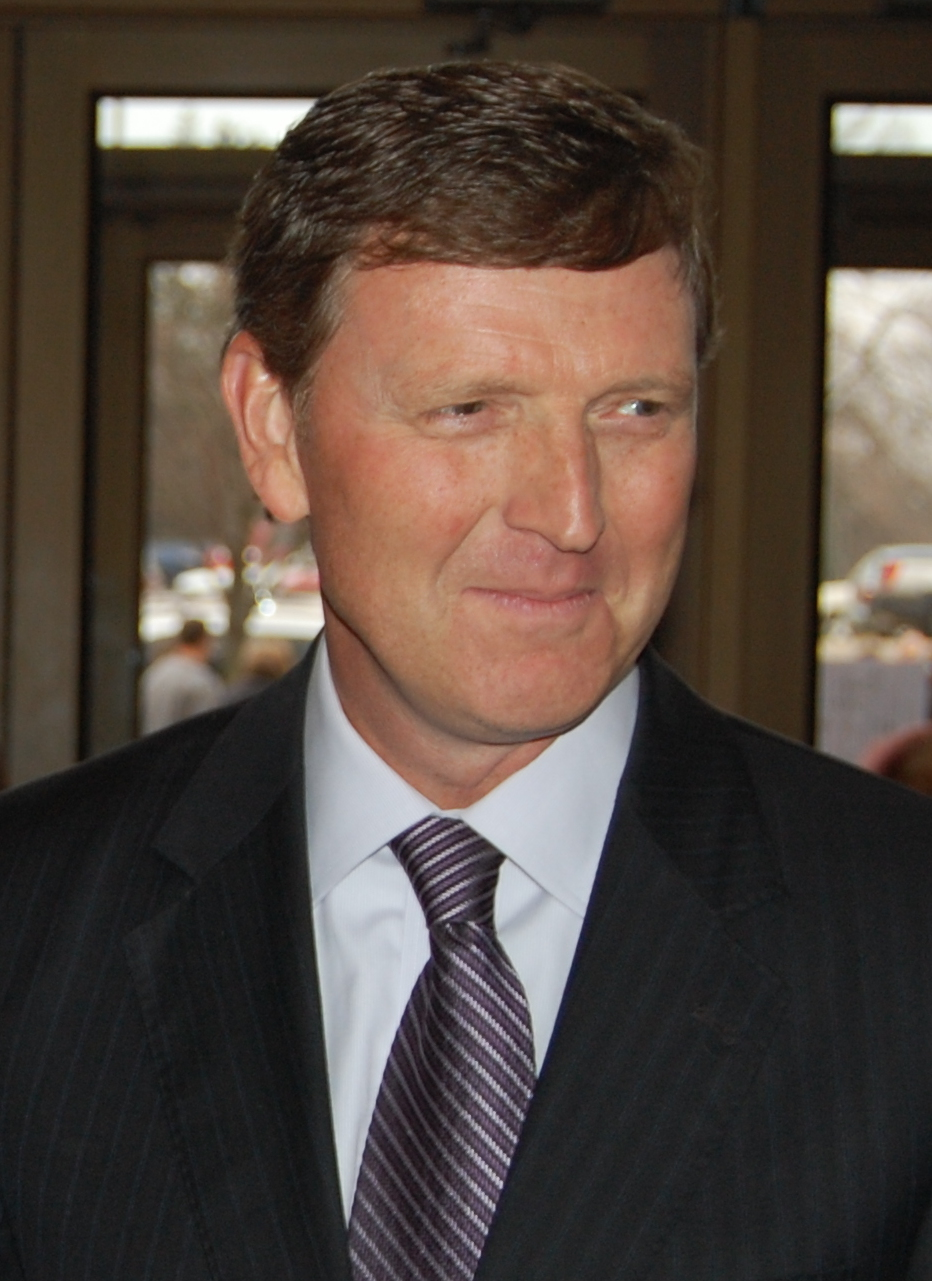
- Born: Robert Lee Vander Plaats; April 12, 1963 (age 63); Sheldon, Iowa, U.S.
- Education: Northwestern College (BA); Drake University (MEd)
- Political party: Republican
- Spouse: Darla
- Children: 4

Robert Lee Vander Plaats (born April 12, 1963) is an American politician and political activist. Since 2010, he has been the president and CEO of The Family Leader, a socially conservative organization in Iowa.

Active in Republican Party politics, Vander Plaats ran unsuccessfully for Governor of Iowa in 2002, 2006, and 2010. He was the party's nominee for lieutenant governor in 2006 on a ticket with Jim Nussle, which lost to Democratic candidate Chet Culver.

== Early life and education ==
Vander Plaats was born in Sheldon, Iowa. He graduated from Western Christian High School in Hull, Iowa. He later attended Northwestern College in Orange City on a basketball scholarship, earning a degree in education. He earned a master's degree in the area of Educational Leadership from Drake University.

== Career ==
=== Education ===
After earning his undergraduate degree, Vander Plaats became a high school teacher and basketball coach. He was principal at Marcus-Meriden-Cleghorn High School and later Sheldon High School. Vander Plaats served as president of Opportunities Unlimited before moving on in the same role with MVP Leadership, Inc.

=== Elections ===
In 2002, Vander Plaats unsuccessfully ran for the Iowa GOP gubernatorial nomination, losing to Doug Gross.

Vander Plaats was a candidate for the 2006 Iowa Republican gubernatorial nomination, competing against Iowa Congressman Jim Nussle. As the race progressed, he withdrew his candidacy for governor in favor of being Nussle's running mate in the general election. Calls by GOP party higher-ups for Vander Plaats to get out of the race were reportedly due to Vander Plaats reporting only $459,000 cash on hand compared to Nussle's $2.5 million. The Republican ticket of Nussle–Vander Plaats lost the election to the Democratic ticket of Culver/Judge.

On January 26, 2009, Vander Plaats announced the formation of a 2010 gubernatorial campaign committee with state Representative Jodi Tymeson as chair and former state Auditor Dick Johnson as co-chair of the committee.

In the Iowa gubernatorial election of 2010, incumbent Democratic governor Chet Culver ran for re-election. The Republican candidates were Vander Plaats, state representative Rod Roberts, and former governor Terry Branstad. In the Republican primary on June 8, 2010, Vander Plaats lost to Branstad, receiving 40 percent of the vote compared to 50 percent for Branstad. Roberts was third with 9 percent of the vote.

=== Political activism ===
Vander Plaats served as the Iowa state chair of Republican presidential candidate and former Arkansas governor Mike Huckabee's 2008 failed presidential campaign. On many occasions, Huckabee called Vander Plaats the "next Governor of Iowa," suggesting that Vander Plaats would run for governor again in 2010.

In 2010, Vander Plaats successfully led the campaign against the retention of three members of the Iowa Supreme Court who had voted to overturn Iowa's Defense of Marriage Act in Varnum v. Brien.

In November 2010, Vander Plaats became president and chief executive officer of an umbrella group called The Family Leader, a group that includes the Iowa Family Policy Center, Marriage Matters, and a political action committee. Through the new group, the socially conservative organizations planned to play a more influential role in the 2012 Iowa caucus campaigns than in 2007 and 2008, including offering an endorsement for the first time.

In December 2011, Vander Plaats endorsed Rick Santorum for president. ABC News reported that Vander Plaats had solicited up to a million dollars from Santorum and other candidates in exchange for his endorsement, that he and Santorum had discussed the subject of money when negotiating the endorsement, and that he had tried to get Michele Bachmann of Minnesota to drop out of the race. The Family Leader denied the report. Santorum won the 2012 Iowa Republican presidential caucuses.

In 2015, Vander Plaats endorsed Ted Cruz for President, saying Cruz was the "most consistent and principled conservative who has the ability to not only win Iowa but I believe to win the (Republican) nomination." Cruz won the 2016 Iowa Republican presidential caucuses.

In 2018, he published an opinion piece in The New York Times titled "Cruelty at the Border Is Not Justice" in which he characterized the Trump administration family separation policy as "unconscionable" and "inexcusable."

A July 2023 article by The Wall Street Journal revealed that Vander Plaats "wants someone other than Trump" as the Republican nominee for the 2024 presidential election. On November 21, 2023, Vander Plaats announced his endorsement of Florida governor Ron DeSantis. DeSantis lost the 2024 Iowa Republican presidential caucuses.

The Family Leader's IRS 990 form filed in 2020 revealed he was paid $190,000 as head of his organization. The next highest-paid employee earned less than half of that amount.

== Personal life ==
He and his wife, Darla, have four sons. Their third son, Lucas, had partial pachygyria lissencephaly from birth, and died in 2021, aged 28. Vander Plaats wrote a book about him, Light from Lucas: Lessons in Faith from a Fragile Life, which was published by Tyndale House in 2007.

Party political offices
Preceded by Debi Durham	Republican Party nominee for Lieutenant Governor of Iowa; 2006	Succeeded by Kim Reynolds
