= Mike Blouin =

American politician (born 1945)

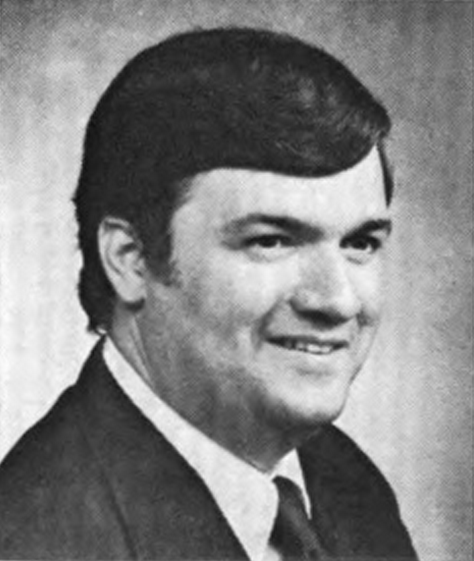

Member of the U.S. House of Representatives from Iowa's 2nd district
- In office January 3, 1975 – January 3, 1979
- Preceded by: John Culver
- Succeeded by: Tom Tauke

Personal details
- Born: Michael Thomas Blouin; November 7, 1945 (age 80) Naval Air Station Jacksonville, Florida, U.S.
- Party: Democratic
- Spouse: Suzanne Blouin
- Education: Loras College (BA)

Michael Thomas Blouin (born November 7, 1945) is an American politician who served as a Democratic member of the United States House of Representatives from 1975 to 1979, representing Iowa's 2nd congressional district. He was a candidate in the 2006 race for Governor of Iowa but lost in the primary to Chet Culver.

== Political career ==
Blouin was born on a Naval Air Base in Jacksonville, Florida, and attended school in Miami Shores, Florida, and Chicago, Illinois. In 1966 he received a B.A. in political science from Loras College in Dubuque, Iowa. He remained in Dubuque to teach elementary school. Two years later, he won a seat in the Iowa House of Representatives, where he served from 1969 to 1973. Blouin then won election to the Iowa Senate, serving from 1973 to 1974.

In 1974 Blouin ran for the U.S. House seat in the Second District being vacated by fellow Democrat John C. Culver, who was running for the U.S. Senate seat being vacated by Harold Hughes. Blouin defeated Republican Tom Riley, an attorney from Cedar Rapids, in the general election. Blouin became one of many freshman Democrats in the largest Democratic majority in the House since 1965-67, providing a mathematical two-thirds majority in that chamber. For the only time since 1857, Iowa's congressional delegation included only one Republican.

Blouin won re-election in 1976, defeating Riley in a closer rematch. Besides shifting control of the White House to the Democrats, the 1976 elections expanded the Democratic majority in the House by one seat. It was the last time the Democrats would hold a two-thirds majority.

Blouin was defeated by Tom Tauke in 1978, as part of a mid-term election that was the first phase of a conservative backlash, particularly in the Midwest. He was appointed by President Jimmy Carter to be the first Director of the newly formed Information Security Oversight Office; he served from 1978 to 1980.

He is an ordained deacon in the Catholic Church. He founded a special ministry for those with Alzheimer's Disease, which included his now-deceased wife. Blouin was director of the Iowa Department of Economic Development from January 2003 to July 2005, and became a candidate for the Democratic nomination for Governor in 2006. He was also a chamber of commerce executive.

== Gubernatorial bid ==
Blouin lost a 2006 Democratic Party primary for Iowa governor, running against a field which included Iowa Secretary of State Chet Culver (the primary winner) and seven-term state representative Ed Fallon.

Blouin had received the endorsement of more than 80% of the state's Democratic legislators and most of the state's labor unions, including the Teamsters and AFSCME. Blouin has an anti-abortion perspective on abortion but had stated that he will not sign any legislation limiting the right to an abortion, even if Roe v. Wade is overturned. He selected pro-choice business executive Andrea McGuire as his pick to be lieutenant governor. The selection of McGuire was initially questioned by the media and Blouin's opponents because she was registered as a Republican as recently as 2004 and has made past contributions to Republicans including Congressman Jim Nussle, the presumptive 2006 Republican nominee for governor. McGuire also made significant contributions to Democratic candidates within the same time span, and supported Howard Dean's 2004 presidential bid.

U.S. House of Representatives
Preceded by John C. Culver	Member of the U.S. House of Representatives from Iowa's 2nd congressional district 1975–1979	Succeeded by Tom Tauke
U.S. order of precedence (ceremonial)
Preceded by Edward Mezvinsky as Former U.S. Representative	Order of precedence of the United States as Former U.S. Representative	Succeeded by Rod Blum as Former U.S. Representative
