= Republican Party of Iowa =

Iowa affiliate of the Republican Party

- Chairperson: Jeff Kaufmann
- Senate leader: Jack Whitver
- House leader: Pat Grassley
- Founder: Samuel J. Kirkwood; Edward Russell
- Founded: 1856; 170 years ago
- Headquarters: 621 East Ninth Street; Des Moines, Iowa 50309
- Ideology: Conservatism in the United States
- National affiliation: Republican Party
- Colors: Red
- Slogan: "First in the Nation"
- Seats in the United States Senate: 1 / 2
- Seats in the United States House of Representatives: 1 / 4
- Seats in the Iowa Senate: 32 / 50
- Seats in the Iowa House of Representatives: 56 / 100
- Statewide Executive Offices: 3 / 7

Election symbol

Website
- www.iowagop.org

The Republican Party of Iowa (RPI) is the affiliate of the United States Republican Party in Iowa. The State Central Committee is chaired by Jeff Kaufmann. The RPI operates the Republican side of the Iowa caucuses and previously sponsored the Iowa Straw Poll.

== Officeholders ==
As of 2027, the Republican Party of Iowa controls three of the seven statewide offices in Iowa and a majority in the Iowa House of Representatives and Iowa Senate. Republicans also hold one of the state's U.S. Senate seats and one of the four U.S. House seats.

=== Members of Congress ===
The RPI holds one of Iowa's U.S. Senate seats and one of Iowa's four U.S. House seats.

==== U.S. Senate ====
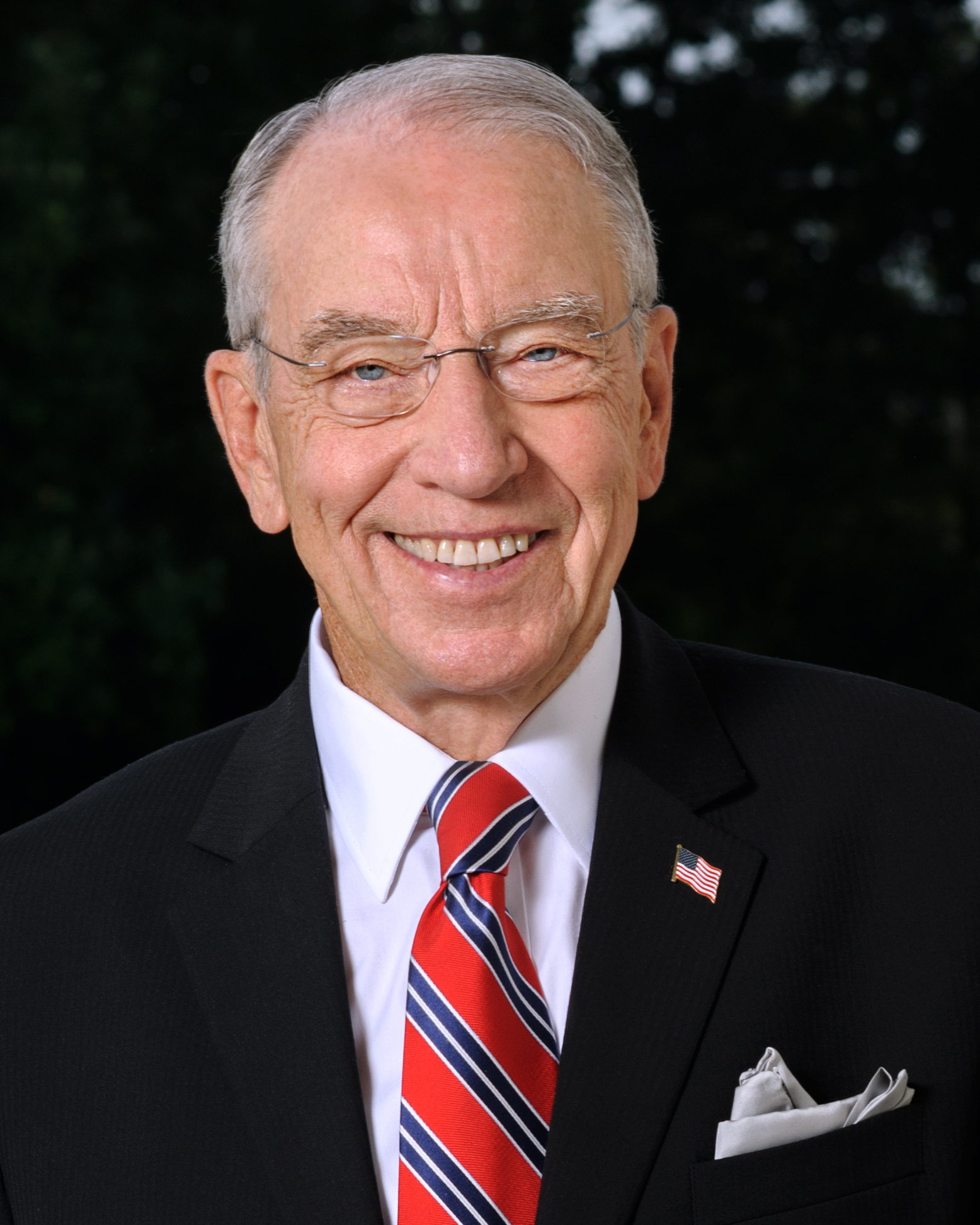
Chuck Grassley, Senior United States senator from Iowa

- Chuck Grassley

==== U.S. House of Representatives ====
District	Member	Photo
4th	Chris McGowan (elect)	

=== Statewide offices ===
- Secretary of State: Paul Pate
- Secretary of Agriculture: Mike Naig
- Treasurer of Iowa: Roby Smith

=== Municipal ===
The following Republicans hold prominent mayoralties in Iowa:

- Cedar Rapids: Tiffany O'Donnell (2)

== State Central Committee ==
The State Central Committee of the Republican Party of Iowa is composed of the National Committeeman and National Committeewoman, and representatives elected by the District Caucus from each congressional district.

=== Executive officers ===
The Republican Party of Iowa's State Central Committee also consists of several executive officers, including chairman, Co-chairman, State Finance Chair, and State Co-Finance Chair. These executive members do not need to be seated members of the state central committee. These members also do not have a vote on standard proceedings. The State Chairman may vote only in the case of a tie or to create a tie during a meeting which he is presiding over.

=== Committees ===
The Republican Party of Iowa is unique in that it has committees of the state party that can conduct local business. In particular, the party can have a Legislative Campaign Committee in each Congressional District with the purpose of helping Republicans win legislative races. In addition to the Legislative Campaign Committee there are several other standing committees of the Republican Party of Iowa they include: the Budget Committee, the Campaign Committee, the Organization Committee, and the Personnel Committee.

=== County level ===
Each county in Iowa may form a County Central Committee. These committees include two members elected by each precinct in the county, though additional members may be elected based on the number of votes for Republican candidates in the previous general election from each precinct. Additionally, the county central committee elects a: Chairman, Co-chairman, Treasurer, and Secretary from either seated members of the county central committee or from Republicans within the county.

=== Platform ===
The Republican Party of Iowa also develops an in-depth platform about what the state party stands for. In general this statement is a general document cementing the principle of the Republican Party while leaving some issues up to individual party voters.

== History ==
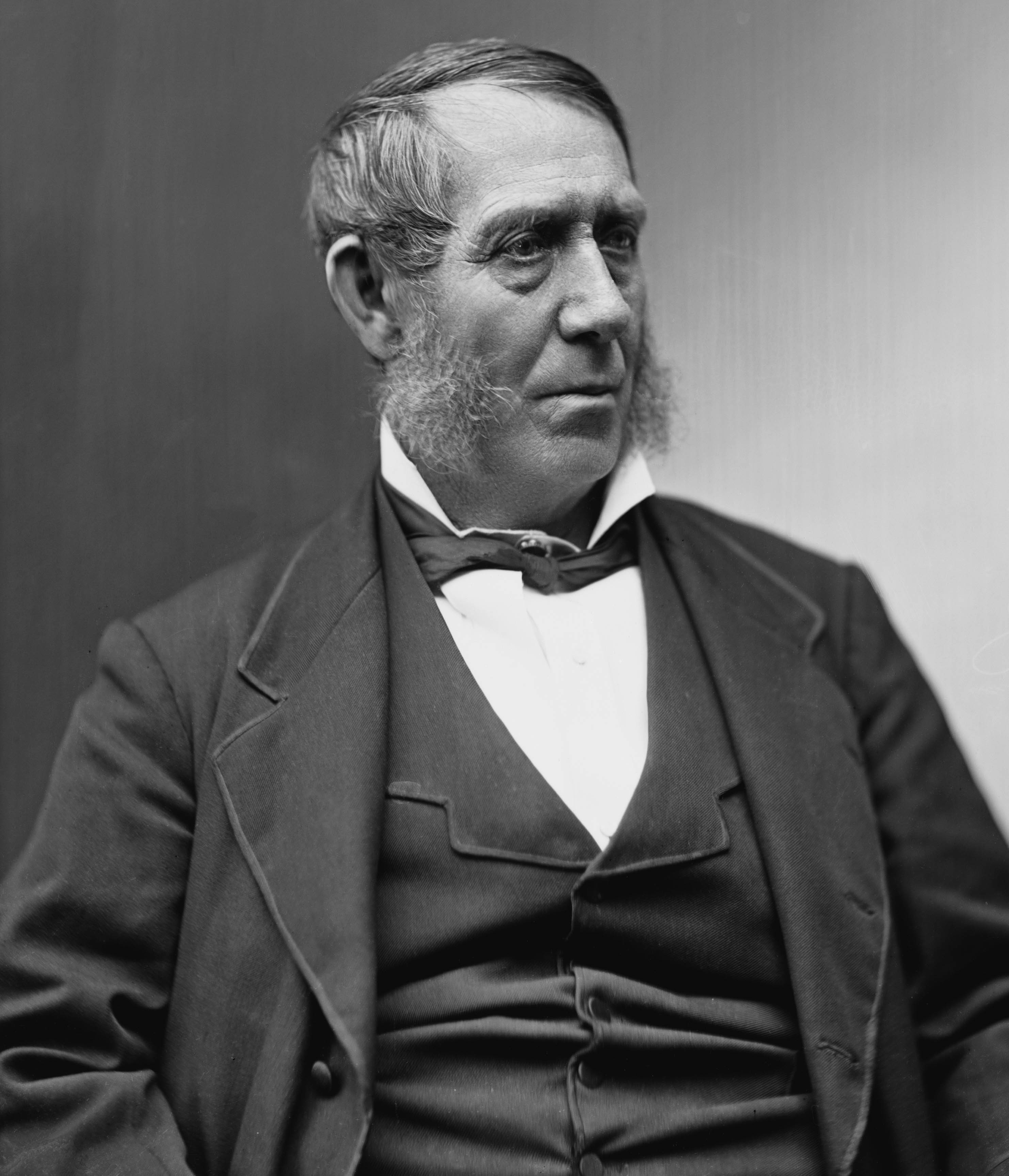
Samuel J. Kirkwood, founder of the Republican Party of Iowa, abolitionist, and Iowa's Civil War governor

The RPI was founded on an anti-slavery platform in 1856 by citizens dissatisfied with the existing Whig and Democratic Parties. Samuel J. Kirkwood, abolitionist and later Iowa's Civil War governor, is credited as one of the principal founders. Summoned from his mill at Coralville and still coated in flour dust, Kirkwood gave a rousing speech at the founding meeting of the Republican Party of Iowa in February 1856 in Iowa City. Many people credited Kirkwood's speech and subsequent work with the success of the party in Iowa. Another principal founder was Edward Russell, an outspoken abolitionist editor who later turned the Davenport Gazette into an award-winning Republican newspaper and one of the largest dailies in Iowa. At the Republican State Convention in 1865, Russell introduced the resolution declaring negro suffrage in Iowa and carried it by a decisive majority. His more famous son, Charles Edward Russell, went on to found the National Association for the Advancement of Colored People (NAACP).

Pro-Union sentiment during and after the Civil War helped the party to expand in importance. Between 1858 and 1932 the Republicans won every Iowa gubernatorial election, with the exception of 1890, when Horace Boies, a former Republican, was elected because of his opposition to Prohibition. In 1932 electoral frustration with the Great Depression and Prohibition led to the re-emergence of the Democratic Party in Iowa. Historically the party has held the Governor's office – 30 of Iowa's 41 governors have been Republicans.

The only Republican president from Iowa was Herbert Hoover (a native of West Branch) who was in office from 1929 to 1933.

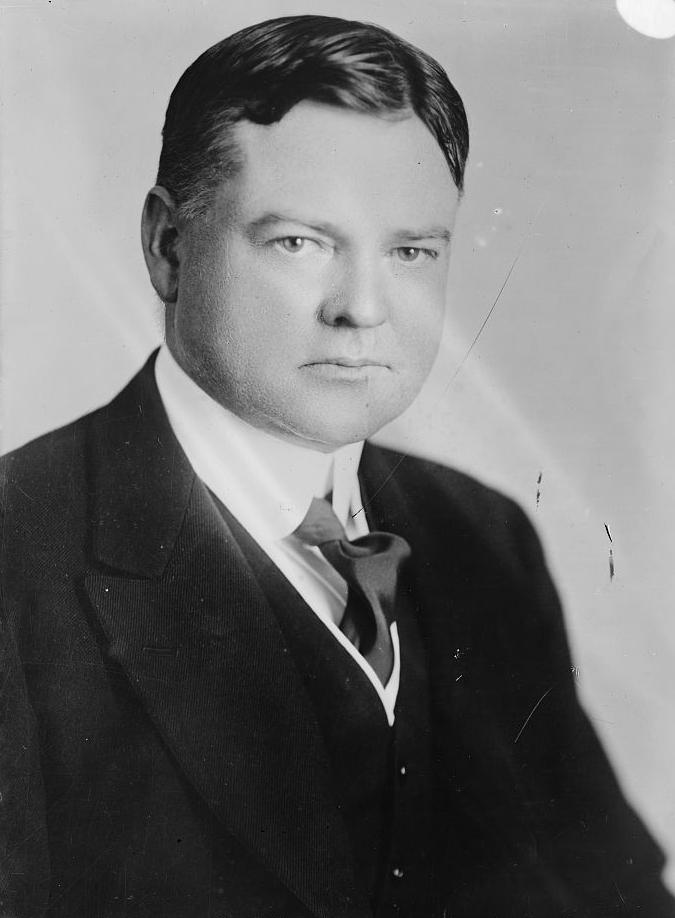
President Herbert Hoover (1929–1933)

== Presidential selection ==
=== Straw poll ===
Since 1979, the RPI has held a straw poll in Iowa in each year preceding a presidential election, except when there is a Republican incumbent. This straw poll is separate from the Republican caucuses. The straw poll includes a dinner, multiple speeches by candidates, and a variety of booths set up by various candidates and causes, in addition to an actual straw poll of participants' presidential preferences.

=== Iowa Caucuses ===
The Iowa Caucuses are the kickoff for the national presidential selection process. Iowa holds a powerful position in that process because it can serve as a sounding board for the strength of a candidate's campaign. A win in the Iowa Caucuses can validate a candidate or propel them from relative obscurity. In particular the Iowa Republican Caucuses hold the most power when either the GOP is not the party in the presidency or an incumbent is not on the ballot. As Iowa is the first state to cast its votes on the nominee the media often focus heavily on opinion polls from the state to determine which way Republican voters are leaning.

In 2008 former Arkansas Governor Mike Huckabee grew in name recognition because of his Iowa victory and grew his national profile. In 2000 with a potentially heated nomination fight between then Texas Governor George W. Bush and Arizona Senator John McCain, Bush, who carried the state with 41% of the vote, set the tone for his campaign and set up a successful run for the Republican nomination and the presidency.

During the 2012 Republican primaries the Republican Party of Iowa partnered with various news organizations such as Fox News to bring a series of debates that were nationally televised, but directed toward voters in Iowa. This national attention is a potential political boon for a small Midwestern state and attracts attention politically to a state that may otherwise not receive such attention. The caucuses also give power to the party members in the electorate. Traditionally, Iowa has been first and then followed by the state of New Hampshire, but states such as South Carolina, Nevada, and Florida have been moving up the dates of their presidential primaries to try to capture some of the media and political attention that Iowa and New Hampshire receive.

== Electoral history ==
=== Gubernatorial ===
Iowa Republican Party gubernatorial election results
Election	Gubernatorial candidate	Votes	Vote %	Result
1994	Terry Branstad	566,395	56.8%	Won ✓
1998	Jim Ross Lightfoot	444,787	46.5%	Lost ✗
2002	Doug Gross	456,612	44.5%	Lost ✗
2006	Jim Nussle	467,425	44.4%	Lost ✗
2010	Terry Branstad	592,494	52.81%	Won ✓
2014	Terry Branstad	666,032	58.99%	Won ✓
2018	Kim Reynolds	667,275	50.26%	Won ✓
2022	Kim Reynolds	709,198	58.04%	Won ✓
2026	Zach Lahn	608,045	44.4%	Lost ✗
