= 2002 Iowa gubernatorial election =

- November 5, 2002
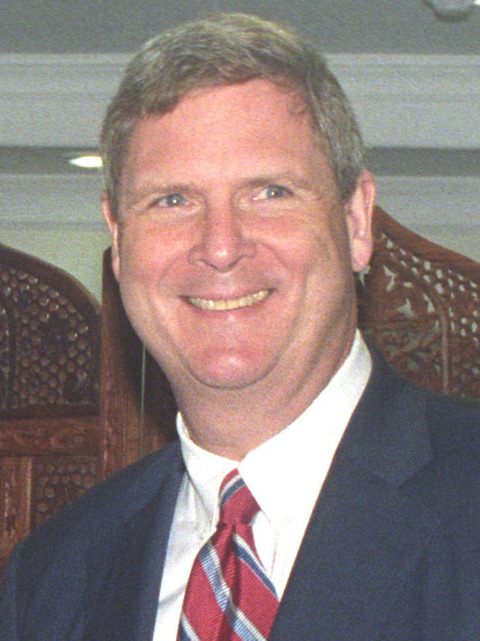

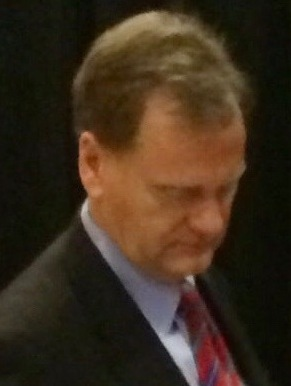
Nominee	Tom Vilsack	Doug Gross
Party	Democratic	Republican
Running mate	Sally Pederson	Debi Durham
Popular vote	540,449	456,612
Percentage	52.69%	44.51%
- Vilsack: 40–50% 50–60% 60–70% Gross: 40–50% 50–60% 60–70% 70–80% 80–90%
Governor before election
Tom Vilsack
Democratic
Elected Governor
Tom Vilsack
Democratic

The 2002 Iowa gubernatorial election took place on November 5, 2002. Incumbent Democratic Governor of Iowa Tom Vilsack sought re-election to a second term as governor. He won his party's nomination uncontested, while Doug Gross, an advisor to former and future Governor Terry Branstad, narrowly won the Republican primary in a crowded and competitive election. In the general election, Vilsack was able to improve slightly on his margin of victory four years earlier to win what would be his second and final term as governor.

== Democratic primary ==
=== Candidates ===
- Tom Vilsack, incumbent governor of Iowa

=== Results ===
Democratic primary results
Party	Candidate	Votes	%
Democratic	Tom Vilsack (incumbent)	79,277	98.55
Democratic	Write-ins	1,166	1.45
Total votes		80,443	100

== Republican primary ==
=== Candidates ===
- Doug Gross, advisor to former Governor Terry Branstad
- Steve Sukup, Iowa state representative (1995–2003)
- Bob Vander Plaats, family values activist

=== Results ===
Primary results by county: Gross: Gross—61-70%; Gross—51-60%; Gross—41-50%; Gross—31-40%; Sukup: Sukup—81-90%; Sukup—71-80%; Sukup—61-70%; Sukup—51-60%; Sukup—41-50%; Sukup—31-40%; Vander Plaats: Vander Plaats—81-90%; Vander Plaats—71-80%; Vander Plaats—61-70%; Vander Plaats—51-60%; Vander Plaats—41-50%; Vander Plaats—31-40%

Republican primary results
Party	Candidate	Votes	%
Republican	Doug Gross	71,478	35.88
Republican	Steve Sukup	64,490	32.37
Republican	Bob Vander Plaats	63,077	31.66
Republican	Write-ins	189	0.09
Total votes		199,234	100

== General election ==
=== Debate ===
2002 Iowa gubernatorial election debate
No.	Date	Host	Moderator	Link	Democratic	Republican
Key: P Participant A Absent N Not invited I Invited W Withdrawn						
Key: P Participant A Absent N Not invited I Invited W Withdrawn					Tom Vilsack	Doug Gross
1	Oct. 12, 2002	Des Moines Register	Paul Anger	C-SPAN	P	P

=== Predictions ===
Source	Ranking	As of
The Cook Political Report	Tossup	October 31, 2002
Sabato's Crystal Ball	Lean D	November 4, 2002

=== Polling ===
Poll source	Date(s) administered	Sample size (Note: Key: A – all adults RV – registered voters LV – likely voters V – unclear)	Margin of error	Tom Vilsack (D)	Doug Gross (R)	Other / Undecided
SurveyUSA	October 27–29, 2002	614 (LV)	± 4.1%	56%	42%	3%

=== Results ===
Iowa gubernatorial election, 2002
Party	Candidate	Votes	%	±%
Democratic	Tom Vilsack (incumbent)	540,449	52.69%	+0.39%
Republican	Doug Gross	456,612	44.51%	−2.00%
Green	Jay Robinson	14,628	1.43%	
Libertarian	Clyde Cleveland	13,098	1.28%	
Write-ins		1,025	0.10%	
Majority		83,837	8.17%	+2.37%
Turnout		1,025,802		
Democratic hold		Swing		

==== Counties that flipped from Republican to Democratic ====
- Adams (largest city: Corning)
- Hardin (largest city: Iowa Falls)
- Winnebago (largest city: Forest City)
- Clarke (largest city: Osceola)
- Louisa (largest city: Wapello)
- Mitchell (largest city: Osage)
- Union (largest city: Creston)
- Appanoose (largest city: Centerville)
- Decatur (largest city: Lamoni)
- Lucas (largest city: Chariton)
- Monona (largest city: Onawa)
- Ringgold (largest city: Mount Ayr)
- Taylor (largest city: Bedford)
- Wayne (largest city: Corydon)
- Wright (largest city: Eagle Grove)
- Cherokee (largest city: Cherokee)
- Calhoun (largest city: Rockwell City)
- Carroll (largest city: Carroll)
- Keokuk (largest city: Sigourney)
- Woodbury (largest city: Sioux City)
- Washington (largest city: Washington)
- Pocahontas (largest city: Pocahontas)
- Franklin (largest city: Hampton)
- Delaware (largest city: Manchester)
- Humboldt (largest city: Humboldt)
- Adair (largest city: Greenfield)
- Scott (largest city: Davenport)

==== Counties that flipped from Democratic to Republican ====
- Jefferson (largest city: Fairfield)
- Dickinson (largest city: Spirit Lake)
- Sac (largest city: Sac City)
- Winneshiek (largest city: Decorah)

=== By congressional district ===
Vilsack won four of five congressional districts, including three that elected Republicans.

District	Vilsack	Gross	Representative
1st	54%	43%	Jim Nussle
2nd	56%	40%	Jim Leach
3rd	54%	44%	Leonard Boswell
4th	54%	43%	Tom Latham
5th	44%	53%	Steve King

== See also ==
- 2002 United States gubernatorial elections
- State of Iowa
- Governors of Iowa
