= Michael Mauro =

American politician

30th Secretary of State of Iowa
- In office January 12, 2007 – January 14, 2011
- Preceded by: Chet Culver
- Succeeded by: Matt Schultz

Personal details
- Born: September 29, 1948 (age 78)
- Party: Democratic
- Spouse: Dorothy
- Children: 3
- Education: Drake University
- Occupation: Former high school teacher, coach, and county auditor

Michael Anthony Mauro (born September 29, 1948) was the Iowa Secretary of State. He previously served as County Auditor and Commissioner of Elections for Polk County, Iowa for nearly a decade. Mauro is also a former high school government teacher and coach, and is a graduate of Drake University.

Mauro was elected to be Iowa's 30th Secretary of State on November 7, 2006, with 541,234 votes, defeating Republican opponent Mary Ann Hanusa.

In November 2010, Mauro was defeated for reelection.

== Notes ==
Party political offices
Preceded by Chet Culver	Democratic nominee for Secretary of State of Iowa; 2006, 2010	Succeeded by Brad Anderson
Political offices
Preceded by Chet Culver	Iowa Secretary of State; 2007 – 2011	Succeeded by Matt Schultz
