= Chet Culver =

American politician (born 1966)

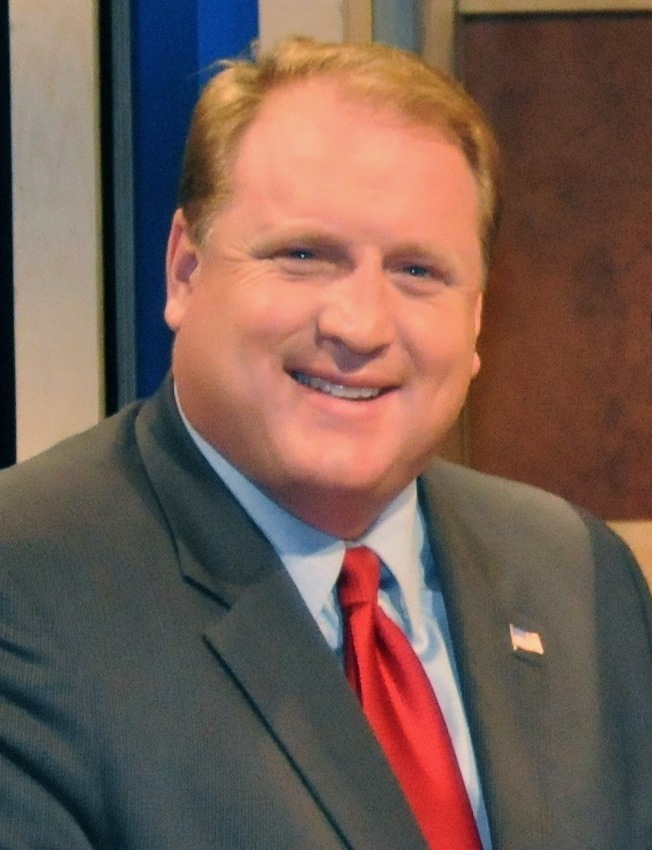
- Culver in 2010

41st Governor of Iowa
- In office January 12, 2007 – January 14, 2011
- Lieutenant: Patty Judge
- Preceded by: Tom Vilsack
- Succeeded by: Terry Branstad

29th Secretary of State of Iowa
- In office January 15, 1999 – January 12, 2007
- Governor: Tom Vilsack
- Preceded by: Paul Pate
- Succeeded by: Michael Mauro

Personal details
- Born: Chester John Culver; January 25, 1966 (age 60) Washington, D.C., U.S.
- Party: Democratic
- Spouse: Mariclare Thinnes (m. 1993)
- Relatives: John Culver (father)
- Education: Virginia Tech (BA); Drake University (MA)

Chester John Culver (born January 25, 1966) is an American politician who served from 2007 through 2011 as the 41st governor of Iowa. A member of the Democratic Party, he served as the 29th Secretary of State of Iowa from 1999 to 2007. He was elected governor in the 2006 Iowa gubernatorial election and ran unsuccessfully for re-election in 2010, losing to Terry Branstad.

While governor, he was also elected as the Federal Liaison for the Democratic Governors Association, serving from 2008 to 2009. In this role, he represented DGA's perspectives to the United States Congress and presidential administration. He founded the Chet Culver Group, an energy sector consulting firm, in 2011 after he left public office. As of 2026, he is the most recent Governor of Iowa from the Democratic Party. He was appointed to be a member of the Federal Agricultural Mortgage Corporation's board of directors in 2012 by President Barack Obama, serving until 2019, and was re-appointed by President Joe Biden on May 23, 2022.

== Early life and education ==
Culver was born in Washington, D.C. He is the son of Ann (née Cooper) and John Culver, a former U.S. senator (D-IA). Culver attended Bethesda-Chevy Chase High School in Bethesda, Maryland. He studied at Virginia Tech on a football scholarship, where he earned a Bachelor of Arts degree in political science in 1988. Later, he received a Master of Arts degree in education from Drake University in 1994.

== Career ==
After college, Culver moved to Iowa and worked as a staff member for the state Democratic Party. He worked with Bonnie Campbell on her 1990 campaign for state attorney general, serving as field director. Culver had previously worked as a lobbyist under the guidance of Campbell's husband.

From 1991 to 1995, Culver worked as a consumer and environmental advocate in the attorney general's office. After completing his master's degree, he took a job as a teacher in Des Moines. Working first at Roosevelt High School and then Hoover High School, he taught government and history. Culver coached sophomore football and eighth-grade boys basketball during his tenure.

=== Secretary of state of Iowa ===
In 1998, Culver ran for Secretary of State of Iowa and was elected by 27,262 votes. At the age of 32, he was the youngest Secretary of State in the United States at the time. He was reelected to a second term in 2002 by 106,310 votes. While serving at this post, he created the Iowa Student Political Awareness Club, which attempts to get students motivated to participate in politics when they reach voting age.

=== Governor of Iowa ===
==== Elections ====
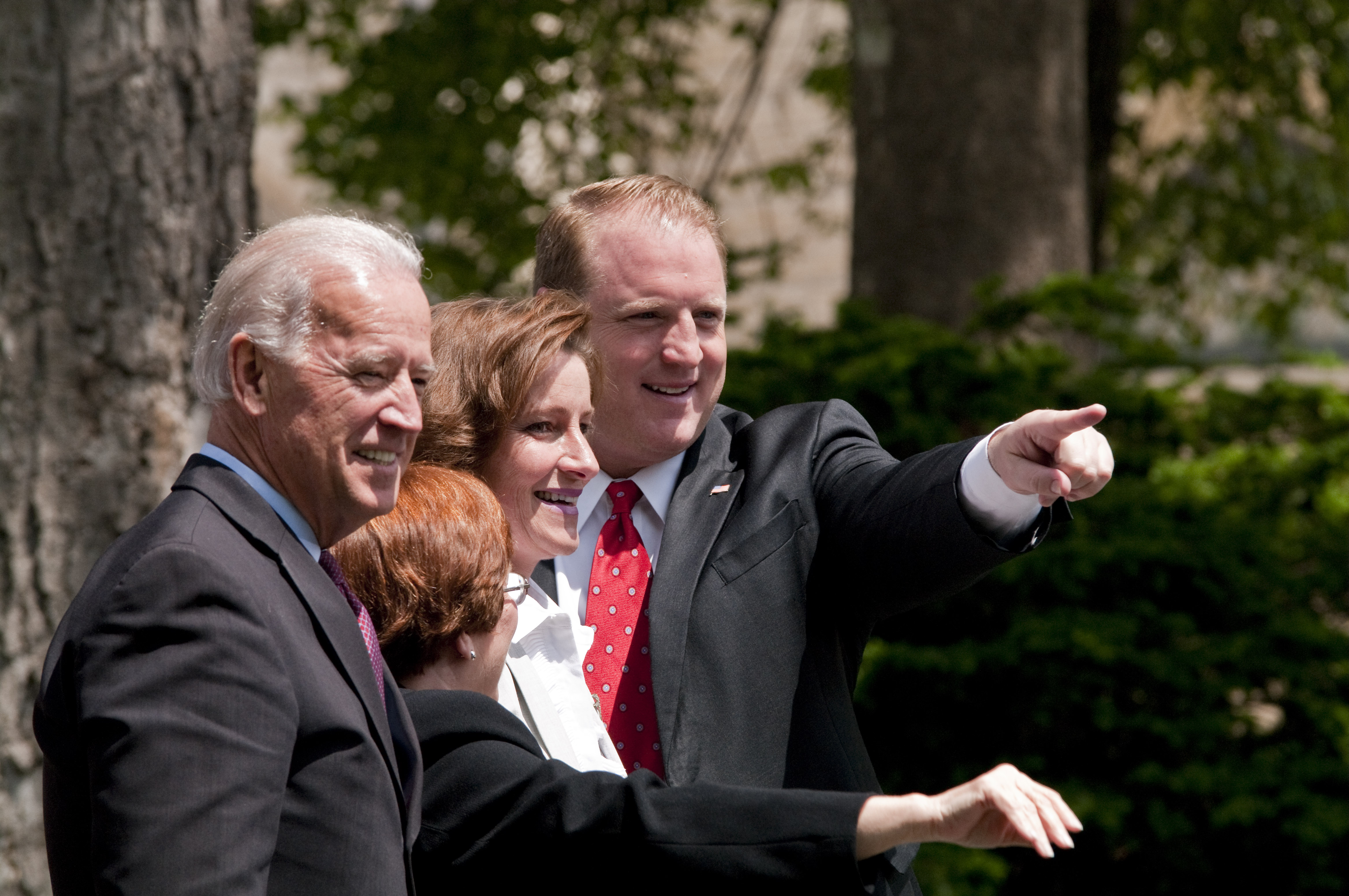
Vice President Joe Biden (left) and Governor Culver (right) in 2010

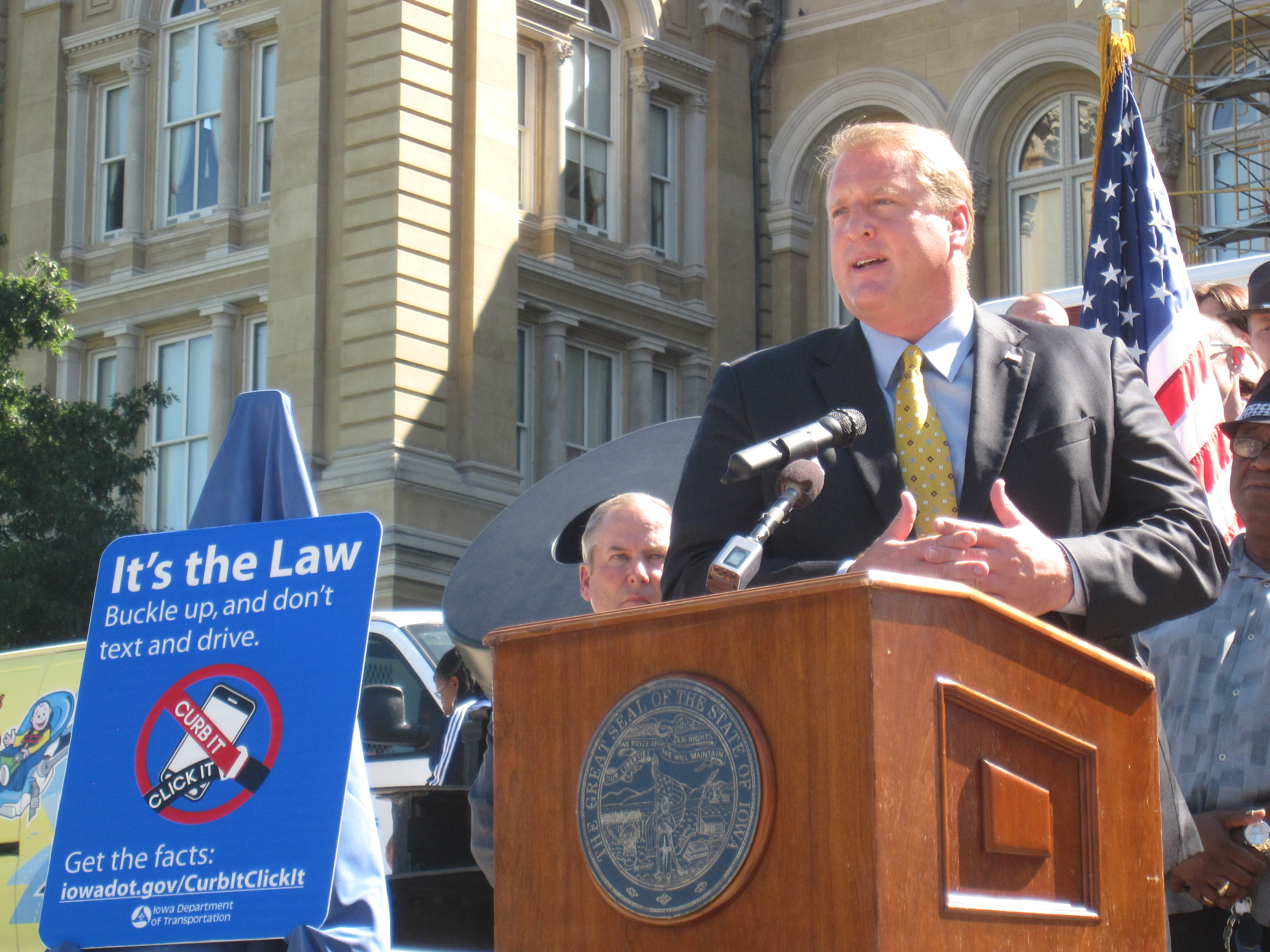
Governor Culver in 2010

In 2005, Culver announced his candidacy for Governor of Iowa. He defeated three opponents in the 2006 primary when he received 39% of the vote to 34% for Mike Blouin, 25% for Ed Fallon, and 1% for Sal Mohamed. Culver then ran and won against Jim Nussle in the general election by 101,596 votes.

Culver ran for reelection in 2010, with incumbent Lieutenant Governor Patty Judge. He lost to Republican Terry Branstad, a four-term former governor who was running with State Senator Kim Reynolds. by 107,696 votes.

=== Tenure ===
==== Stem cell research ====
Culver signed legislation easing limits on types of stem cell research in Iowa. "The new legislation allows medical researchers to create embryonic stem cells through cloning. While allowing for further research, it prohibits reproductive cloning of humans," according to National Public Radio. Culver said lifting the ban will "give hope to those suffering from diseases such as cancer, diabetes, Parkinson's and Alzheimer's." In addition, Culver proposed spending $12.5 million to establish a stem cell research center at the University of Iowa. NPR called it a "Key Moment in the Stem Cell Debate."

==== 2008 floods ====
A September 2008 poll of Iowans found 60% supported Culver's handling of the major floods that struck Iowa and much of the Midwest that year. A year later, Culver and other state elected officials expressed "outrage" at the slow pace of disbursement of federal funding to affected areas.

In 2010, Culver proposed a $40 million "disaster relief fund" in the state and declared March 2010 "Flood Awareness Month."

==== Minimum wage ====
Culver signed legislation instituting Iowa's first minimum wage increase in a decade in 2007, raising the hourly wage from $5.15 to $7.25.

==== Alternative energy ====
Culver touted Iowa as the leading alternative "energy capital of the world". He started a "power fund" to assist with that effort. Culver continued Iowa’s strengths in renewable energy, creating the Iowa Power Fund.

=== Post-gubernatorial career ===
He founded the Chet Culver Group, an energy sector consulting firm, in 2011 after he left public office.

In 2012, Culver joined the Board of Directors of the Federal Agricultural Mortgage Corporation after being nominated by former President Barack Obama, where he served until 2019. In July 2021, President Joe Biden nominated Culver to be a member of the board of directors of the Federal Agricultural Mortgage Corporation, and he was confirmed by the United States Senate on May 18, 2022. He joined the board on May 23, 2022.

The Associated Press wrote,

"Gov. Chet Culver has bet much of his political future on alternative energy. The power fund was a centerpiece of his campaign for governor, and he managed to push the program through the Legislature. Lawmakers have allocated $49.6 million for the effort over the last two years."

== Electoral history ==
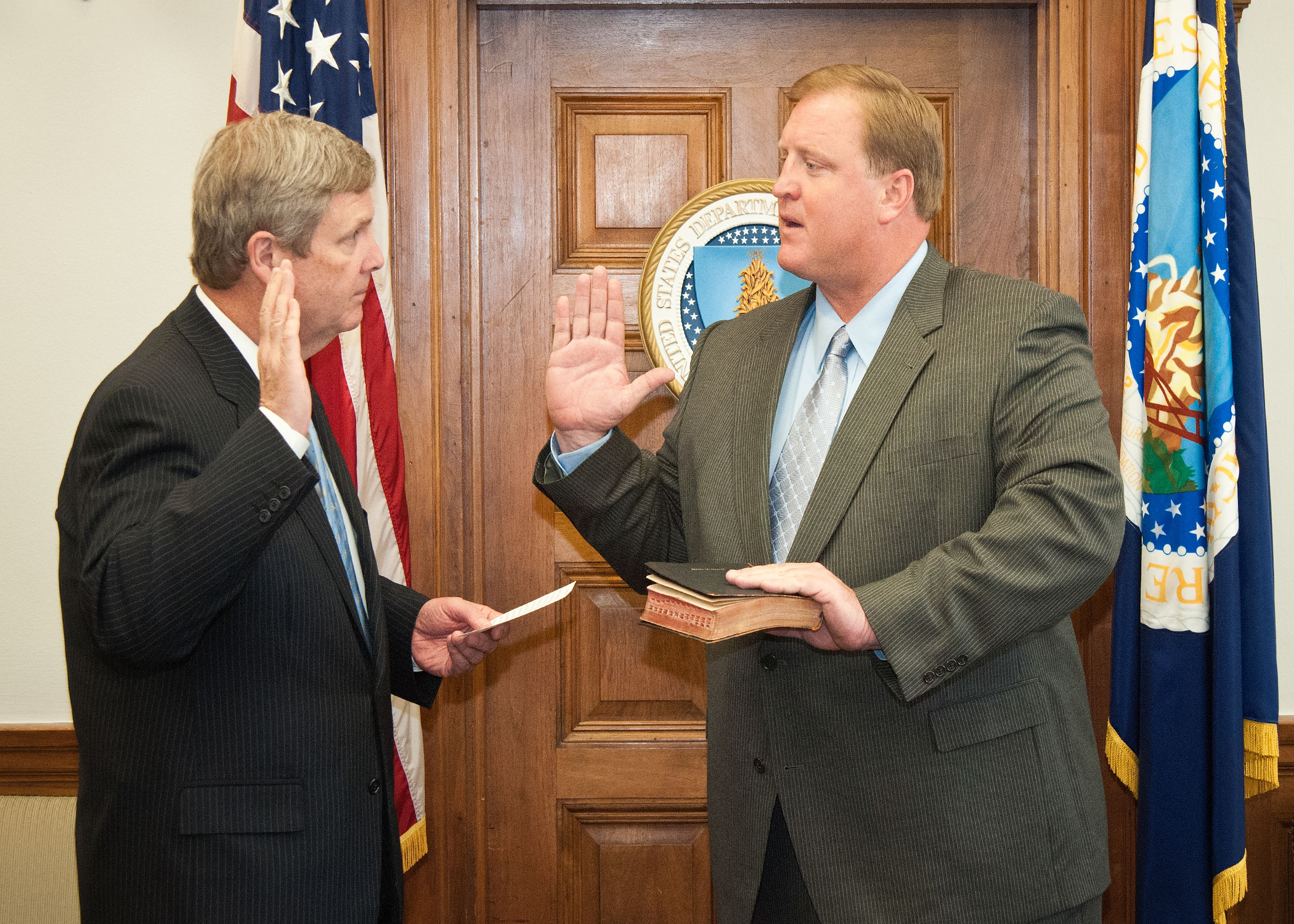
Chet Culver taking the oath of office to serve as a member of the Federal Agricultural Mortgage Corporation's board of directors, 2012.

2010 Iowa Gubernatorial Election
Party	Candidate	Votes	%	±%
Republican	Terry Branstad	592,494	52.81	+8.43
Democratic	Chet Culver (incumbent)	484,798	43.21	−10.81
Iowa Party	Jonathan Narcisse	20,859	1.86	n/a
Libertarian	Eric Cooper	14,398	1.28	+0.74
Independent	Gregory Hughes	3,884	0.35	n/a
Socialist Workers	David Rosenfeld	2,757	0.25	+0.06
Write-in		2,823	0.25	n/a
Majority		107,696	9.60	
Turnout		1,122,013		
Republican gain from Democratic		Swing		

2006 Iowa gubernatorial election
Party	Candidate	Votes	%	±%
Democratic	Chet Culver	569,021	54.02	+1.33
Republican	Jim Nussle	467,425	44.38	−0.13
Green	Wendy Barth	7,850	0.75	−0.68
Libertarian	Kevin Litten	5,735	0.54	−0.74
Socialist Workers	Mary Martin	1,974	0.19	n/a
Write-ins		1,250	0.12	n/a
Majority		101,596	9.65	+1.48
Turnout		1,053,255		
Democratic hold		Swing		

2002 Iowa Secretary of State election
Party	Candidate	Votes	%	±%
Democratic	Chet Culver	526,600	53.46	+3.55
Republican	Mike Hartwig	420,290	42.67	−4.26
Green	Don Arenz	21,434	2.18	n/a
Libertarian	Sylvia Sanders Olson	16,366	1.66	n/a
Write-ins		351	0.04	n/a
Majority		106,310	10.79	
Turnout		1,052,005		
Democratic hold		Swing		

1998 Iowa Secretary of State election
Party	Candidate	Votes	%	±%
Democratic	Chet Culver	457,161	49.91	+3.22
Republican	John Gilliland	429,899	46.93	−4.62
Reform	Sheryl Blue	19,094	2.08	n/a
Natural Law	Daniel Swanson	9,580	1.05	−0.68
Write-ins		277	0.03	n/a
Majority		27,262	2.98	
Turnout		1,052,005		
Democratic gain from Republican		Swing		

== Personal life ==
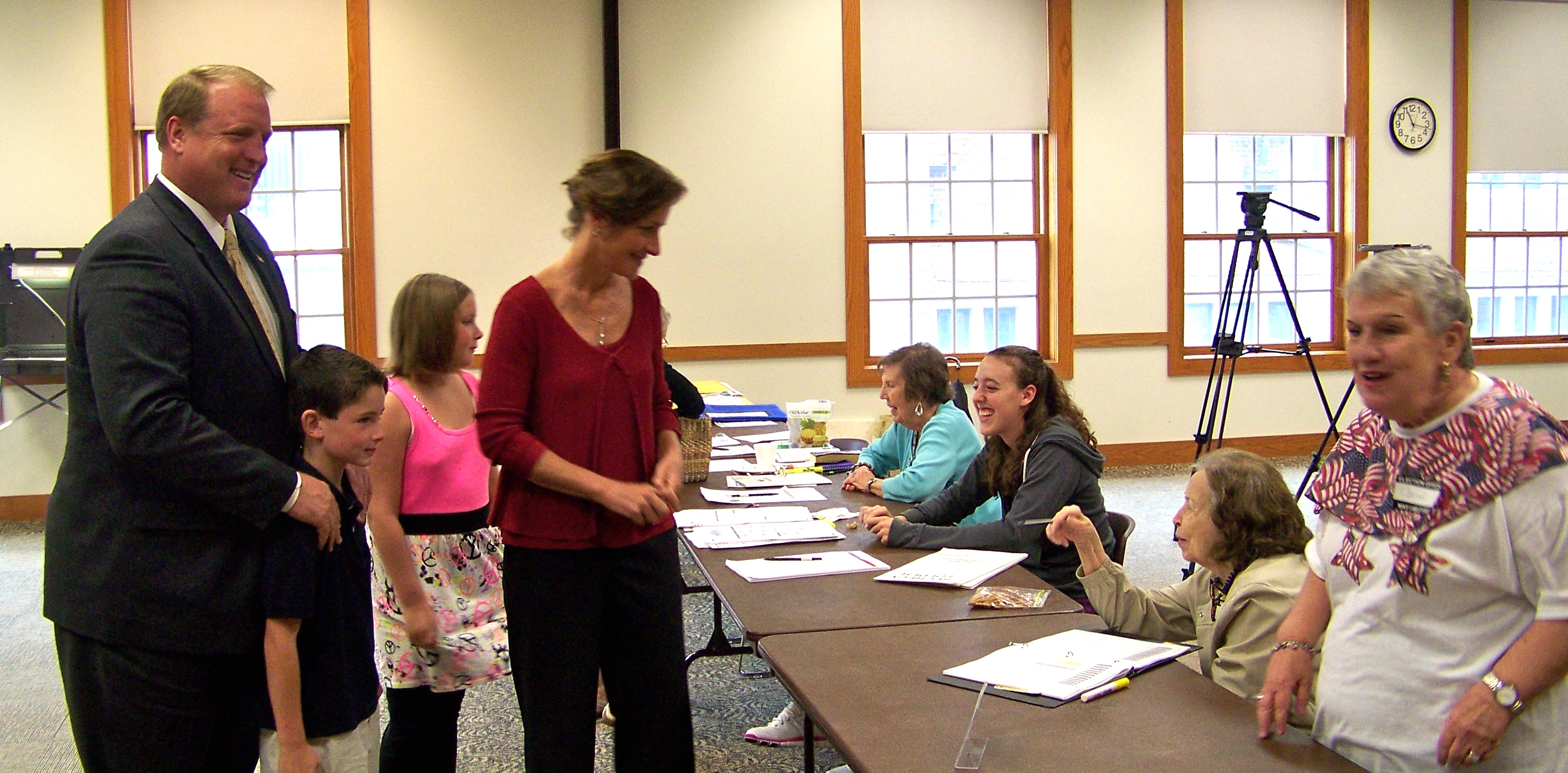
Culver and his wife vote with children in 2007

Culver is a Presbyterian and has served as an elder. His wife Mariclare is a Roman Catholic. Mariclare is also a lawyer and worked in the office of the state attorney general. She left the office in 2023 after Democrat Tom Miller lost his re-election bid and the incoming Republican asked for her resignation and that of 18 other staffers. She gave her personal endorsement to John Edwards in the 2008 Iowa Caucus. A week after Edwards dropped out, Chet Culver endorsed Barack Obama on February 7, 2008 in Omaha, Nebraska, as the Democratic nominee in the 2008 presidential election.

Party political offices
Preceded by Anne Pedersen	Democratic nominee for Secretary of State of Iowa; 1998, 2002	Succeeded by Michael Mauro
Preceded by Tom Vilsack	Democratic nominee for Governor of Iowa; 2006, 2010	Succeeded by Jack Hatch
Political offices
Preceded by Paul Pate	Secretary of State of Iowa; 1999–2007	Succeeded by Michael Mauro
Preceded by Tom Vilsack	Governor of Iowa; 2007–2011	Succeeded by Terry Branstad
U.S. order of precedence (ceremonial)
Preceded by Terry Branstad as Former Governor	Order of precedence of the United States; Within Iowa	Succeeded by Jack Markell as Former Governor
Preceded by Terry Branstad as Former Governor	Order of precedence of the United States; Outside Iowa	Succeeded by Martin J. Schreiber as Former Governor
