= 2010 Iowa gubernatorial election =

- November 2, 2010
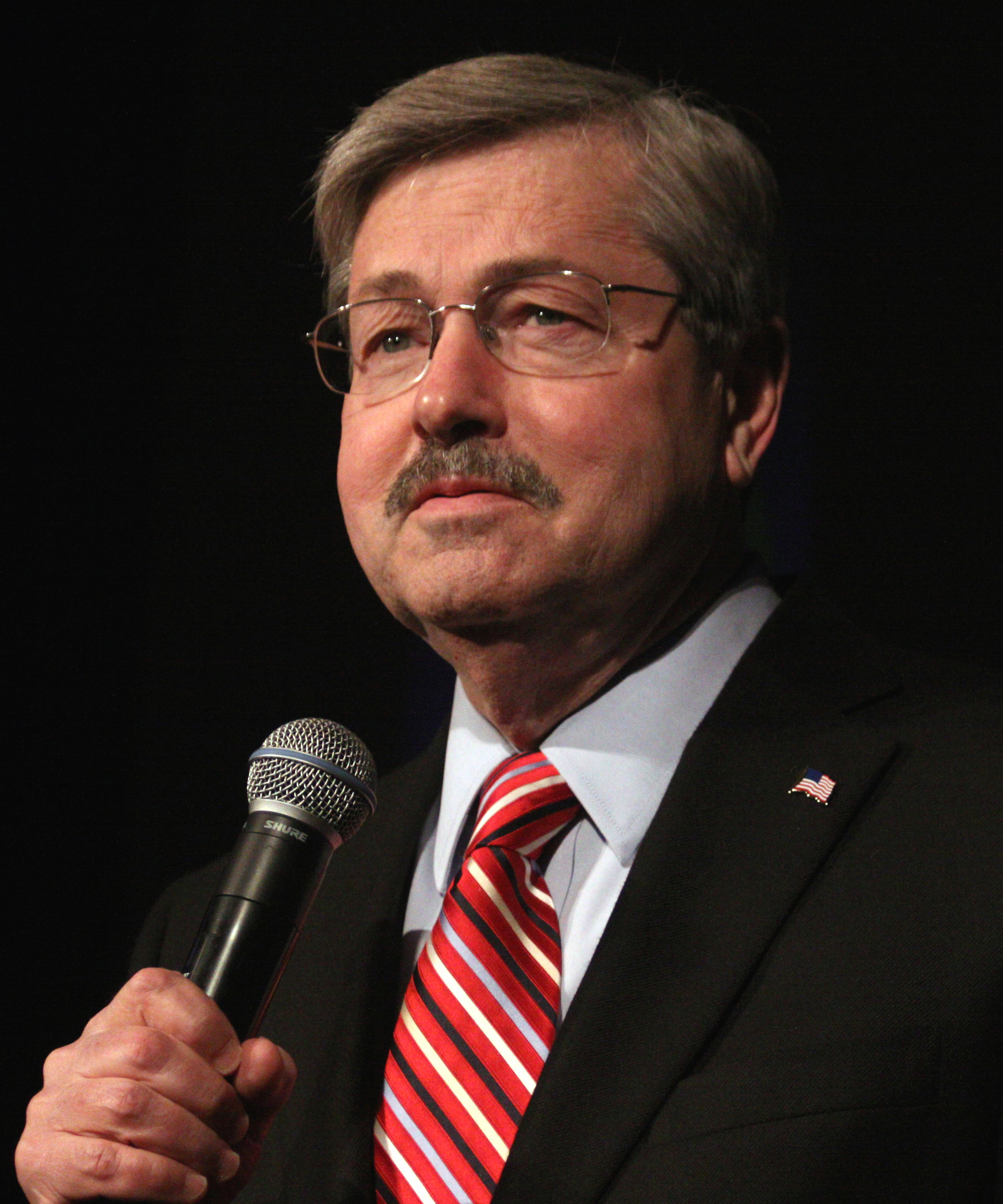

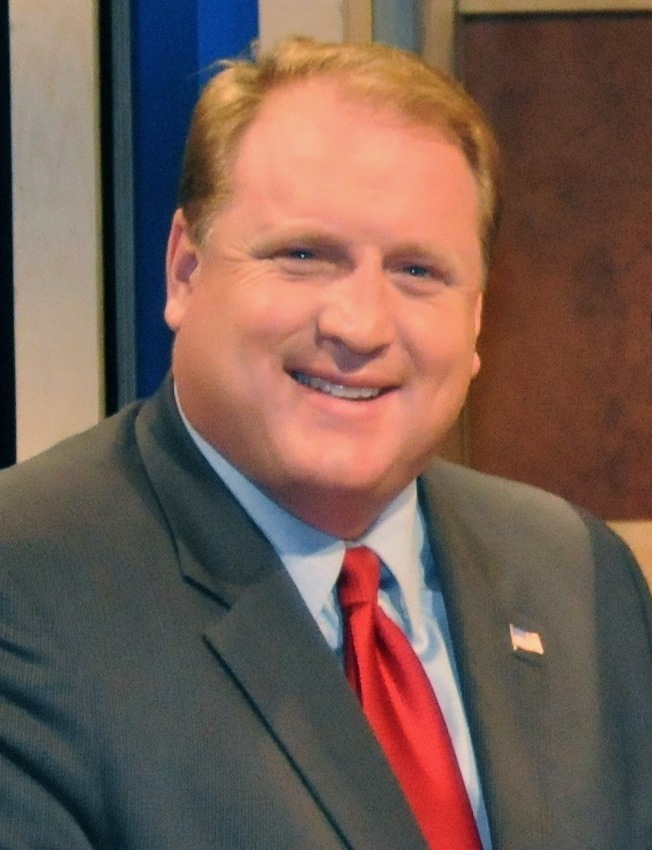
Nominee	Terry Branstad	Chet Culver
Party	Republican	Democratic
Running mate	Kim Reynolds	Patty Judge
Popular vote	592,494	484,798
Percentage	52.81%	43.21%
- Branstad: 40–50% 50–60% 60–70% 70–80% 80–90% Culver: 40–50% 50–60% 60–70%
Governor before election
Chet Culver
Democratic
Elected Governor
Terry Branstad
Republican

The 2010 Iowa gubernatorial election was held on Tuesday, November 2, 2010, to elect the governor and lieutenant governor, to serve a four-year term beginning on January 14, 2011. In Iowa, the governor and lieutenant governor are elected on the same ticket. Along with the election in Ohio, this was one of the two gubernatorial elections where the incumbent lost re-election.

The two major party candidates were first-term incumbent Governor Chet Culver, a Democrat, who ran for re-election with first-term incumbent lieutenant governor Patty Judge, and former four-term Governor Terry Branstad, who won a three-way primary for the Republican nomination and ran with State Senator Kim Reynolds.

Branstad defeated Culver in the general election, becoming the first challenger to unseat an incumbent Iowa governor since Harold Hughes in 1962.

== Democratic primary ==
=== Candidates ===
- Chet Culver, incumbent governor

=== Results ===
Democratic primary results
Party	Candidate	Votes	%
Democratic	Chet Culver (incumbent)	56,293	95.69
Democratic	Write-ins	2,534	4.31
Total votes		58,827	100

== Republican primary ==
=== Candidates ===
==== On ballot ====
As listed by the Iowa Secretary of State's office:

- Terry Branstad, former governor
- Rod Roberts, State Representative
- Bob Vander Plaats, businessman and nominee for lieutenant governor in 2006

==== Withdrew ====
- State Senator Jerry Behn withdrew from the race and endorsed Terry Branstad.
- Cedar Rapids businessman Christian Fong suspended his campaign due to a lack of campaign finances.
- State Senator Paul McKinley withdrew after Terry Branstad formed an exploratory committee.
- Minority Leader of the Iowa House of Representatives Christopher Rants withdrew from the race due to lack of campaign funds.

=== Polling ===
Poll source	Dates administered	Terry Branstad	Bob Vander Plaats	Rod Roberts
Selzer & Co. Inc of Des Moines	June 1–3, 2010	57%	29%	8%
Public Policy Polling	May 25–27, 2010	46%	31%	13%

=== Results ===
Results by county: Branstad: 40–50%; 50–60%; 60–70%; 70–80%; Plaats: 40–50%; 50–60%; 60–70%; 70–80%; Roberts: 70–80%

Republican primary results
Party	Candidate	Votes	%
Republican	Terry Branstad	114,450	50.30
Republican	Bob Vander Plaats	93,058	40.90
Republican	Rod Roberts	19,896	8.74
Republican	Write-ins	121	0.05
Total votes		227,525	100

== General election ==
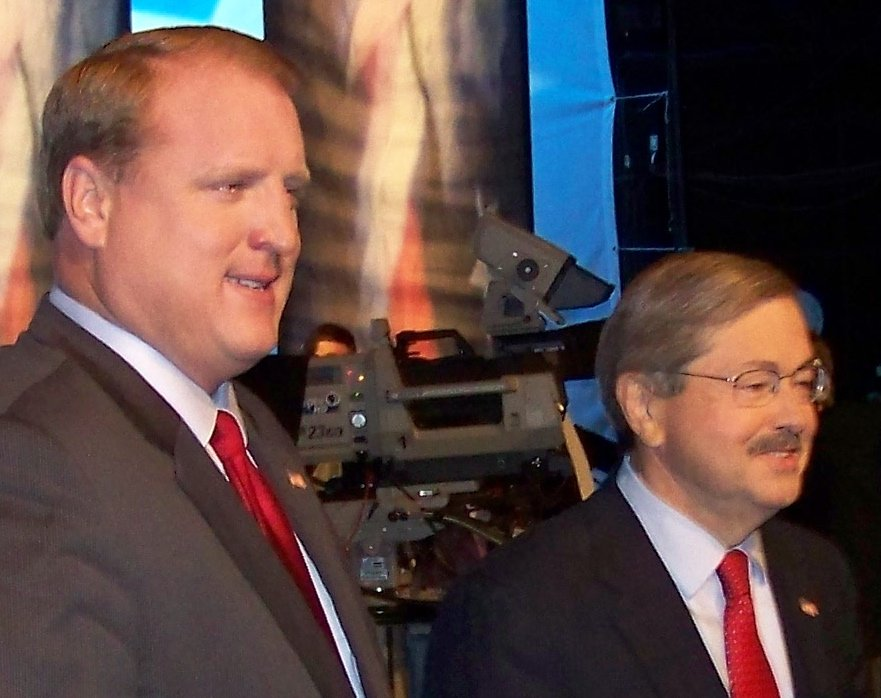
Branstad and Culver at a debate

=== Candidates ===
- Terry Branstad (R), former four-term governor; running with State Senator Kim Reynolds
- Eric Cooper (L), professor at Iowa State University, running with judicial administrator Nick Weltha
- Chet Culver (D), incumbent governor, running with incumbent lieutenant governor Patty Judge
- Jonathan Narcisse (Iowa Party), former member of the Des Moines school board, running with truck driver Rick Marlar. Narcisse is a Democrat and Marlar is a Republican. Narcisse's campaign and that of Senate District 45 candidate Douglas William Phillips were not affiliated, though both appeared on the ballot under the "Iowa Party" name.
- Gregory James Hughes (I), running with Robin Prior-Calef
- David Rosenfeld (SWP), running with Helen Meyers

=== Predictions ===
Source	Ranking	As of
Cook Political Report	Likely R (flip)	October 14, 2010
Rothenberg	Likely R (flip)	October 28, 2010
RealClearPolitics	Likely R (flip)	November 1, 2010
Sabato's Crystal Ball	Likely R (flip)	October 28, 2010
CQ Politics	Tossup	October 28, 2010

=== Polling ===
Poll source	Dates administered	Chet Culver (D)	Terry Branstad (R)
Rasmussen Reports	September 23, 2010	37%	55%
Rasmussen Reports	August 5, 2010	36%	52%
Rasmussen Reports	June 14, 2010	31%	57%
Public Policy Polling	May 25–27, 2010	37%	52%
KCCI-TV	May 3–5, 2010	41%	48%
Rasmussen Reports	April 29, 2010	38%	53%
Rasmussen Reports	March 17, 2010	36%	52%
Rasmussen Reports	February 18, 2010	37%	53%
KCCI-TV	February 15–17, 2010	38%	54%
Selzer & Co. of Des Moines	January 31 – February 3, 2010	33%	53%
Selzer & Co. of Des Moines	November 8–11, 2009	33%	57%
Daily Kos/Research 2000	October 12–14, 2009	43%	48%
Rasmussen Reports	September 22, 2009	34%	54%
Iowa First Foundation	July 23–July 26, 2009	34%	53%
Concordia Group LLC	July 2009	37%	53%

=== Results ===
2010 Iowa gubernatorial election
Party	Candidate	Votes	%	±%
Republican	Terry Branstad	592,494	52.81%	+8.43%
Democratic	Chet Culver (incumbent)	484,798	43.21%	−10.81%
Iowa Party	Jonathan Narcisse	20,859	1.86%	n/a
Libertarian	Eric Cooper	14,398	1.28%	+0.74%
Independent	Gregory Hughes	3,884	0.35%	n/a
Socialist Workers	David Rosenfeld	2,757	0.25%	+0.06%
Write-in		2,823	0.25%	n/a
Total votes		1,122,013	100.00%	n/a
Republican gain from Democratic				

==== Counties that flipped from Democratic to Republican ====
- Adams (largest city: Corning)
- Audubon (largest city: Audubon)
- Benton (largest city: Vinton)
- Emmet (largest city: Estherville)
- Greene (largest city: Jefferson)
- Hamilton (largest city: Webster City)
- Hardin (largest city: Iowa Falls)
- Iowa (largest city: Williamsburg)
- Kossuth (largest city: Algona)
- Palo Alto (largest city: Emmetsburg)
- Warren (largest city: Indianola)
- Winnebago (largest city: Forest City)
- Allamakee (largest city: Waukon)
- Boone (largest city: Boone)
- Bremer (largest city: Waverly)
- Buchanan (largest city: Independence)
- Cedar (largest city: Tipton)
- Cerro Gordo (largest city: Mason City)
- Chickasaw (largest city: New Hampton)
- Clarke (largest city: Osceola)
- Clayton (largest city: Guttenberg)
- Clinton (largest city: Clinton)
- Fayette (largest city: Oelwein)
- Floyd (largest city: Charles City)
- Howard (largest city: Cresco)
- Jackson (largest city: Maquoketa)
- Jasper (largest city: Newton)
- Jones (largest city: Anamosa)
- Louisa (largest city: Wapello)
- Marshall (largest city: Marshalltown)
- Mitchell (largest city: Osage)
- Muscatine (largest city: Muscatine)
- Poweshiek (largest city: Grinnell)
- Scott (largest city: Davenport)
- Tama (largest city: Tama)
- Union (largest city: Creston)
- Wapello (largest city: Ottumwa)
- Webster (largest city: Fort Dodge)
- Winneshiek (largest city: Decorah)
- Worth (largest city: Northwood)
- Appanoose (largest city: Centerville)
- Davis (largest city: Bloomfield)
- Decatur (largest city: Lamoni)
- Hancock (largest city: Garner)
- Henry (largest city: Mount Pleasant)
- Lucas (largest city: Chariton)
- Monona (largest city: Onawa)
- Monroe (largest city: Albia)
- Ringgold (largest city: Mount Ayr)
- Taylor (largest city: Bedford)
- Wayne (largest city: Corydon)
- Wright (largest city: Eagle Grove)

=== By congressional district ===
Branstad won four of five congressional districts, including two that elected Democrats.

District	Culver	Branstad	Representative
1st	47%	50%	Bruce Braley
2nd	50%	46%	Dave Loebsack
3rd	44%	51%	Leonard Boswell
4th	42%	54%	Tom Latham
5th	32%	65%	Steve King
