= TalkShoe =

Podcasting platform

- Website type: podcasting host
- Owner: iotum Inc.
- Creator: Dave Nelsen
- Website: www.talkshoe.com
- Commercial: Yes
- Registration: Optional
- Launched: May 2006
- Current status: Active

TalkShoe is a community-based podcast hosting, recording, and storage platform that allows users to host or participate in live podcasts that were once called "community calls", or simply a "call" for short. Participants can phone in or join via the Web and are able to have a two-way dialogue with the podcast host and listeners. A call can be syndicated and downloaded after the live show ends as a podcast.

In July 2018, TalkShoe was relaunched by iotum Inc. This relaunch included the addition of several new features, including video and integration with YouTube along with an overhaul of TalkShoe's website.

TalkShoe's name is a play on "talk show," using Ed Sullivan's pronunciation of the word "show" as "shoe".

== Administration ==
TalkShoe was founded in May 2006. It is currently owned by iotum Inc, a teleconferencing and group communications company.

=== Podcasts ===
All TalkShoe hosts are required to register on the website in order to participate; however, guests can listen to a show via the web client without registration. Through the registration process, a user chooses a screen name and is given a unique seven digit PIN.

A podcast is started by using TalkShoe.com's web-based interface to create and categorize the show. A podcast may cover any subject matter the host desires, but may not include forbidden content such as pornographic or racist material. The podcast is assigned an ID number that is used by participants to dial in. The host may then schedule a session of the show and optionally send email or SMS text notifications to invite guests. Once a session is scheduled, the host and their guests may dial in up to 15 minutes before the show is scheduled to begin. Guests may connect to a show using the TalkShoe Live! chat client, telephone, or both.

=== Chat ===
TalkShoe's software allows hosts to start or stop the recording of their podcast, and to mute or unmute the text and voice chat ability of guests in the show. It allows guests to listen to the show in streaming audio if they have not phoned in (the stream is automatically muted when the software senses a voice connection from the same user), or to set a flag indicating they wish to be unmuted (that is, allowed to speak "on the air") if they have phoned in. It allows both host and guests to chat via text-message to each other, and to see who is currently and no longer connected to the show.

== History ==
TalkShoe was launched in May 2006 by Dave Nelsen, a former employee of the FORE Systems telecommunication company. Early talkcasts were by local Pittsburgh personalities, including radio talkshow hosts who simulcast via TalkShoe as another method of broadcasting their show and taking call-ins.

In November 2006, talkshow hosts Amber MacArthur and Leo Laporte decided to start hosting their Net@Nite show via TalkShoe. The large increase in traffic to TalkShoe, both in terms of guests into the Net@Nite show and new listeners and hosts who were introduced to TalkShoe and started shows of their own, caused TalkShoe to put a number of planned features on hold in favor of increasing server capacity.

On January 27, 2007, former Iowa governor Tom Vilsack discussed his presidential policy plans on TalkShoe, appearing on the Regular Guys Show hosted by Kurt Hurner. Vilsack came back onto TalkShoe on the Kurt Hurner Show on August 12, 2008, this time as a representative of the Barack Obama for President campaign. Vilsack took calls from listeners for half an hour.

On July 22, 2010, the company developed a new Wordpress Plugin.

On May 2, 2016, TalkShoe was acquired by iotum Inc.

On July 23, 2018, TalkShoe was relaunched to include several new features, including video and a redesigned website.
