= Matt Schultz =

American politician (born 1979)

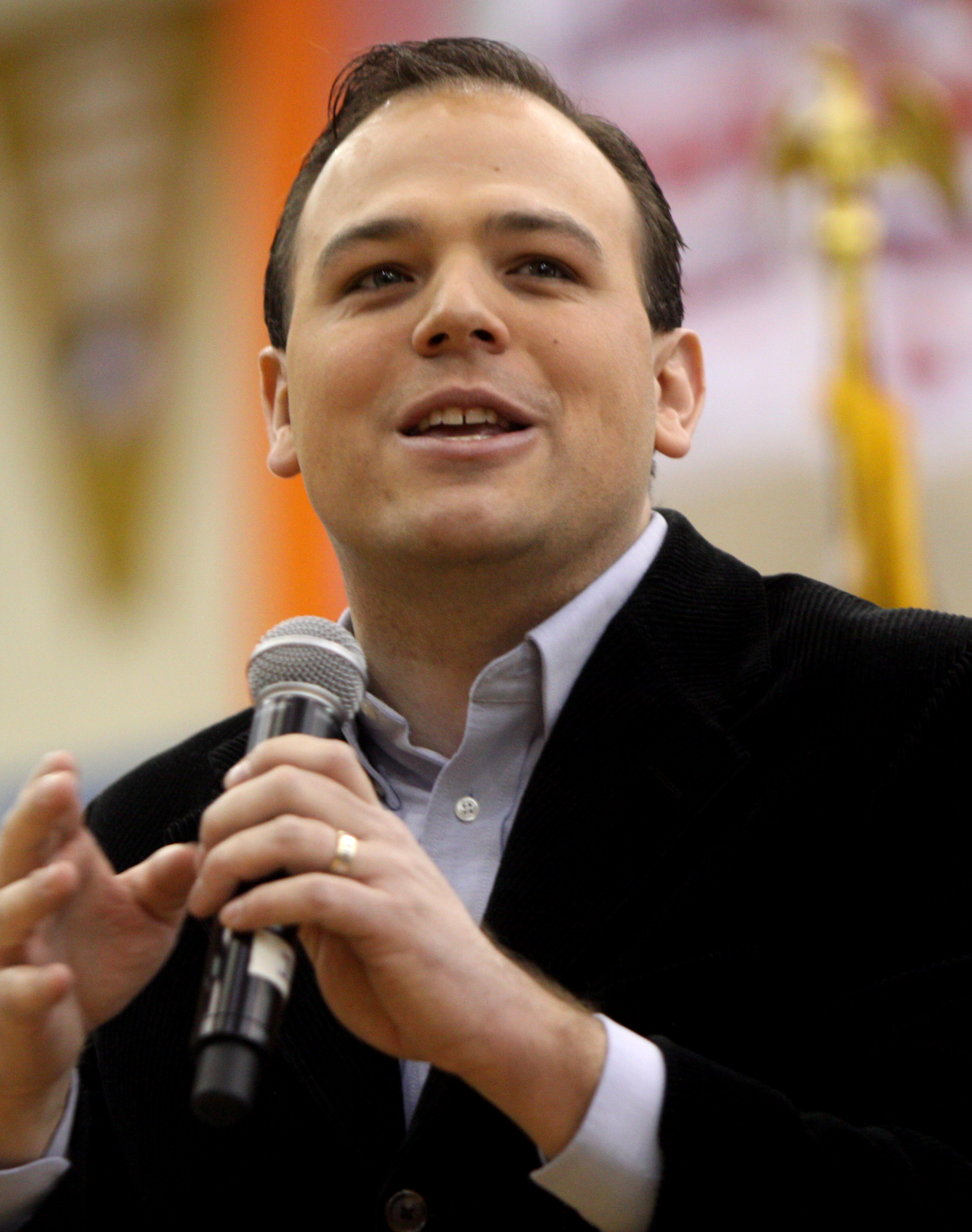

Dallas County Attorney
- Incumbent
- Assumed office 2025
- Preceded by: Jeannine Ritchie

Madison County Attorney
- In office January 2015 – 2023
- Preceded by: Julie Bardwell-Forsyth
- Succeeded by: Stephen Swanson

31st Secretary of State of Iowa
- In office January 14, 2011 – January 14, 2015
- Governor: Terry Branstad
- Preceded by: Michael Mauro
- Succeeded by: Paul Pate

Personal details
- Born: July 23, 1979 (age 47)
- Party: Republican
- Occupation: Attorney
- Website: Secretary of State website

Matt Schultz (born July 23, 1979) is an American politician from the state of Iowa. A member of the Republican Party, he has served as Dallas County attorney since 2025. He previously served as Secretary of State of Iowa from 2011 to 2015, and as Madison County attorney from 2015 to 2023.

== Biography ==
Schultz grew up in West Des Moines, Iowa. He graduated from Valley High School, Brigham Young University–Idaho, the University of Iowa, and the Creighton University School of Law.

He is an Eagle Scout, and is active in the Church of Jesus Christ of Latter-day Saints. He served a two-year mission for the church in Argentina.

He and his wife, Zola, live in Madison County with their five children.

He was elected to public office in 2005 as a city councilman in Council Bluffs, Iowa, where he served for five years.

== Iowa secretary of state ==
Schultz was elected to the position of secretary of state in 2010, and was the youngest secretary of state in the country.

While in office, he created a new statewide lien registration system and focused on a new voter-ID law. He also worked to ease the voting process for active members of the military from Iowa.

On July 20, 2012, Schultz approved two emergency voter fraud rules that would allow him to challenge the registration of voters if their names are similar to names found on state and federal lists of foreign nationals and also approved a rule allowing people to file complaints of voter fraud without oaths via e-mail.

In December 2013, it was reported that an investigation by the office of the secretary of state was passing along 16 cases of voter fraud to local county officials. As of December 17, 2013, five people pleaded guilty to attempted voter fraud, and five other cases were dismissed. On January 22, 2014, Schultz announced charges in nine additional voter fraud cases. Many of the original 16 charges, and all 9 of the later charges, were on citizens convicted of felonies whose voting rights had not been restored. State Auditor Mary Mosiman stated that Schultz' use of HAVA (Help American's Vote Act) funds might be in violation of their intended use. Mosiman said that Schultz' may be required to repay the federal grant if asked to do so.

The Des Moines Register on Feb 24, 2014 reported "more than 80 (cases) have been referred to county attorneys for possible prosecution." On May 15, the paper reported that Schultz's voter fraud investigation cost taxpayers $250,000 and resulted in a total of six guilty pleas, equalling approximately $42,000 per guilty plea.

Schultz initiated the Rock Iowa program, which partners with the national Rock the Vote organization to educate high school seniors about the electoral process and encourage them to register to vote.

=== Photo ID for voters ===
During his tenure as Iowa secretary of state, Schultz supported legislation to require photo identification for voters. He said a voter ID requirement was "common sense" and necessary to prevent voter fraud.

Iowa Democrats said that he was attempting to disenfranchise voters, and the ACLU of Iowa said that voter fraud is not a problem. Iowa Senate Democrats blocked the legislation, and The Gazette, an eastern Iowa newspaper reported, "Schultz has turned a reasonable, principled position into a political sideshow".

== Subsequent career ==
On January 9, 2014, Schultz announced he would be a candidate for the U.S. House of Representatives. He ran to represent Iowa's 3rd congressional district, after the announcement by Congressman Tom Latham that he would be retiring in 2014. He finished third in the primary; receiving less than one fifth of total votes cast, and endorsed eventual candidate David Young at the convention.

He was instead the Republican nominee for Madison County attorney, winning the general election with 61% and defeating incumbent Democrat Julie Bardwell-Forsyth. His tenure ended in 2023.

He narrowly won the Dallas County attorney election in 2024 against Democratic candidate Meggan Guns, and assumed office in 2025.

== Penetration testing arrest controversy ==
Following a civil rights lawsuit brought by two penetration testers hired by the State of Iowa for false arrest, local news media reports that Schultz has threatened to prosecute any testers involved in future security efforts.

Party political offices
Preceded by Mary Ann Hanusa	Republican nominee for Secretary of State of Iowa; 2010	Succeeded by Paul Pate
