= Sally Pederson =

American politician and editor (born 1951)

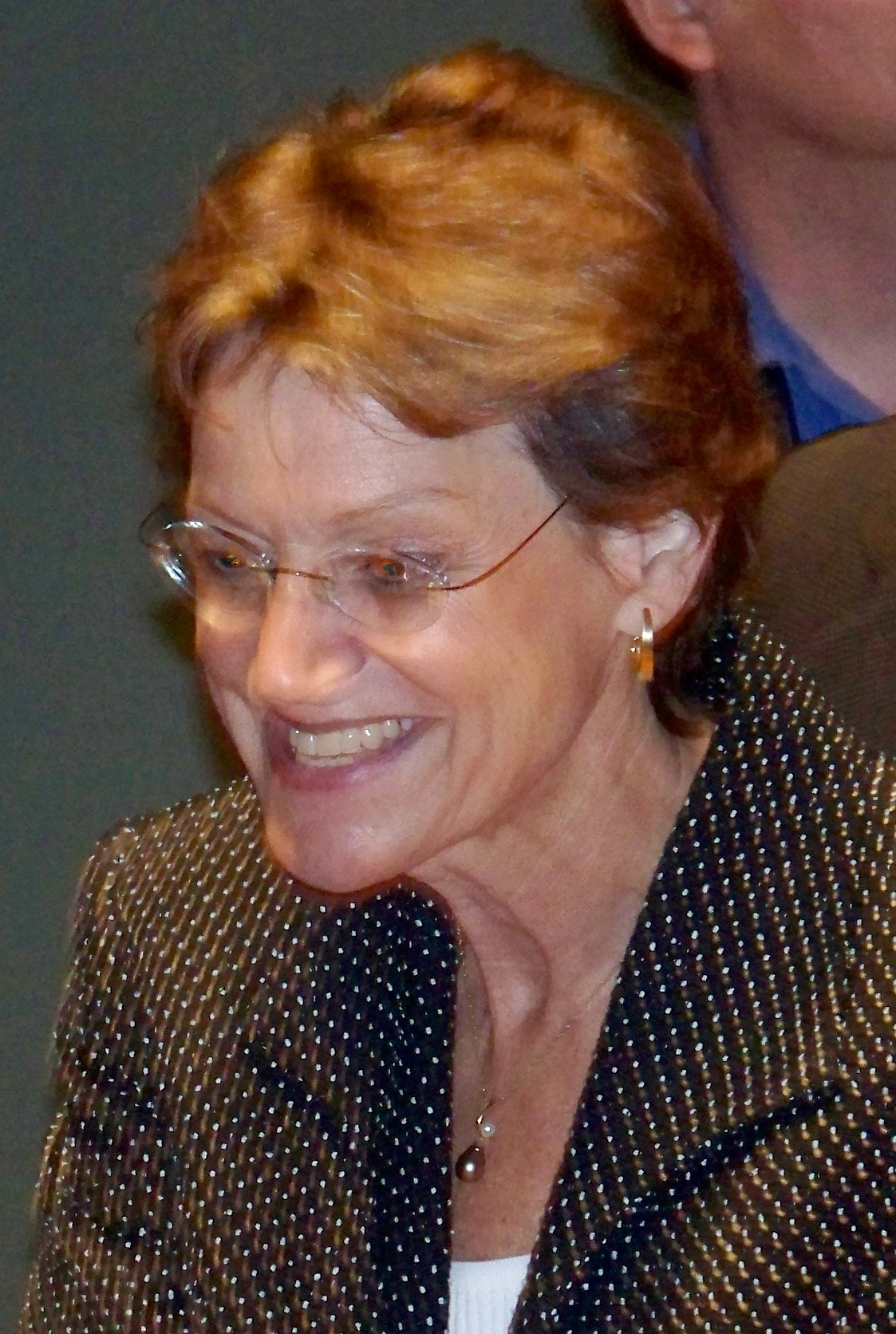

44th Lieutenant Governor of Iowa
- In office January 15, 1999 – January 12, 2007
- Governor: Tom Vilsack
- Preceded by: Joy Corning
- Succeeded by: Patty Judge

Personal details
- Born: January 13, 1951 (age 75) Ottumwa, Iowa, U.S.
- Party: Democratic
- Education: Iowa State University
- Profession: Editor

Sally Pederson (born January 13, 1951) is an American politician and editor who served as the 44th Lieutenant Governor of Iowa from 1999 to 2007.

== Early life and education ==
A Democrat, she is a native of Vinton, Iowa. She graduated in 1973 from Iowa State University in Ames, where she was a member of Kappa Kappa Gamma.

== Career ==
Prior to being elected lieutenant governor on the Vilsack-Pederson ticket in 1998, Pederson served as an executive with the Meredith Corporation in Des Moines, Iowa. She also worked as an editor for Better Homes and Gardens magazine. She ran for lieutenant governor again in 2002 and was re-elected.

During the 2004 presidential election, prior to the selection of John Edwards as the vice presidential candidate, it was widely rumored that Vilsack would be asked to become presidential candidate John Kerry's running mate. It was later rumored that Vilsack would have been offered a cabinet-level position in the event of a Kerry victory. Had that occurred, Pederson would have become the first female Governor of Iowa (this distinction ultimately went to Kim Reynolds in 2017).

Pederson declined to run to succeed Vilsack as Governor of Iowa in the 2006 election.

== See also ==
- List of female lieutenant governors in the United States

Party political offices
Preceded by Leonard Boswell	Democratic nominee for Lieutenant Governor of Iowa; 1998, 2002	Succeeded by Patty Judge
Political offices
Preceded by Joy Corning	Lieutenant Governor of Iowa; 1999–2007	Succeeded by Patty Judge
