= 2006 Iowa gubernatorial election =

- November 7, 2006
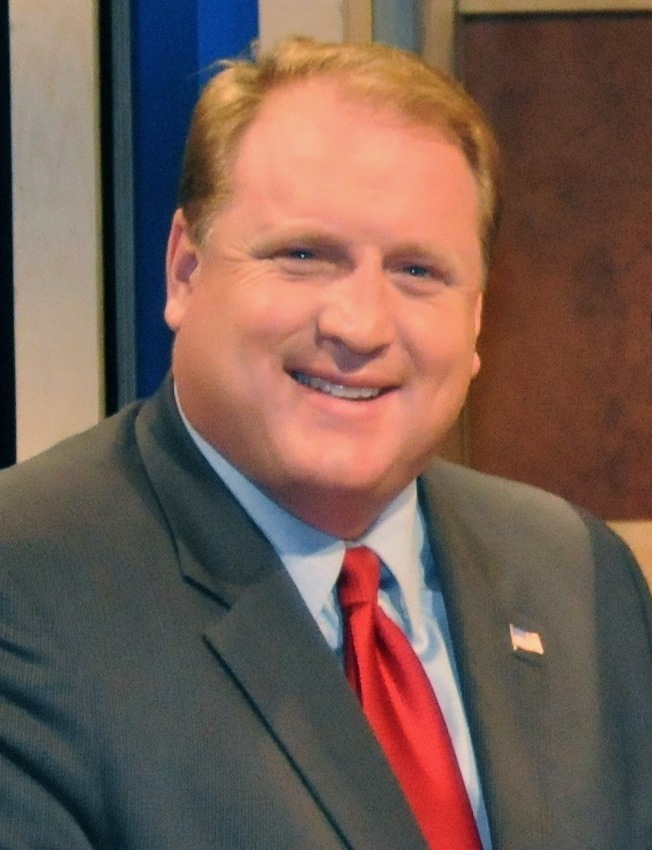

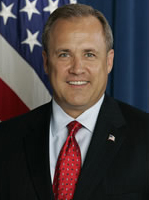
Nominee	Chet Culver	Jim Nussle
Party	Democratic	Republican
Running mate	Patty Judge	Bob Vander Plaats
Popular vote	569,021	467,425
Percentage	54.02%	44.38%
- Culver: 40–50% 50–60% 60–70% Nussle: 40–50% 50–60% 60–70% 70–80% 80–90%
Governor before election
Tom Vilsack
Democratic
Elected Governor
Chet Culver
Democratic

The 2006 Iowa gubernatorial election took place on November 7, 2006. The incumbent governor, Tom Vilsack, a Democrat, had served two terms and decided not to seek a third. In the election, Chet Culver defeated Jim Nussle to win the governorship, by a margin of 54% to 44%.

This election marks the first time Democrats won three consecutive gubernatorial elections in the state since 1966, and the only time Democrats have ever done so for four-year terms. Until Rob Sand’s win in 2026, this was the last time a Democrat was elected Governor of Iowa.

== Democratic primary ==
=== Candidates ===
==== Won primary ====
- Chet Culver, Iowa secretary of state (1999–2007), son of former United States Senator John Culver
  - Running mate: Patty Judge, secretary of agriculture of Iowa (1999–2007) and former state senator

==== Defeated in primary ====
- Mike Blouin, former director of the Iowa Department of Economic Development (2003–2005), former U.S. representative for IA-02 (1975–1979), and 1st director of the Information Security Oversight Office (1979–1980)
  - Running mate: Andrea McGuire, physician
- Ed Fallon, Iowa state representative (1993–2006)
- Sal Mohamed, engineer and 2004 Democratic candidate for Congress

==== Declined to run ====
- Sally Pederson, lieutenant governor of Iowa (1999–2007)

=== Results ===
Primary results by county: Culver: Culver—71-80%; Culver—61-70%; Culver—51-60%; Culver—41-50%; Culver—31-40%; Blouin: Blouin—51-60%; Blouin—41-50%; Blouin—31-40%; Fallon: Fallon—61-70%; Fallon—51-60%; Fallon—41-50%

Democratic primary results
Party	Candidate	Votes	%
Democratic	Chet Culver	58,131	39.08
Democratic	Mike Blouin	50,728	34.10
Democratic	Ed Fallon	38,253	25.72
Democratic	Sal Mohamed	1,545	1.04
Democratic	Write-ins	94	0.06
Total votes		148,751	100.00

== Republican primary ==
=== Candidates ===
- Jim Nussle, U.S. representative

Withdrew

- Bob Vander Plaats, president and CEO of The Family Leader, to become Nussle's running mate for the general election

=== Results ===
Republican primary results
Party	Candidate	Votes	%
Republican	Jim Nussle	73,975	100.00
Total votes		73,975	100.00

== Independents ==
=== Green ===
- Wendy Barth, peace activist and software engineer from Cedar Rapids

=== Libertarian ===
- Kevin Litten, pharmacist from Cedar Rapids

== General election ==
The Democratic nominee, Iowa Secretary of State Chet Culver, selected Iowa Secretary of Agriculture Patty Judge as his running mate. Judge had previously run for the Democratic nomination for governor before dropping out to run for lieutenant governor. The Republican nominee, U.S. Congressman Jim Nussle, selected Sioux City businessman Bob Vander Plaats as his running mate. Vander Plaats, like Judge, had previously run for his party's nomination before dropping out to run for lieutenant governor.

=== Predictions ===
Source	Ranking	As of
The Cook Political Report	Tossup	November 6, 2006
Sabato's Crystal Ball	Lean D	November 6, 2006
Rothenberg Political Report	Lean D	November 2, 2006
Real Clear Politics	Lean D	November 6, 2006

=== Polling ===
Source	Date	Chet Culver (D)	Jim Nussle (R)
Des Moines Register	November 3, 2006	52%	43%
Rasmussen	October 27, 2006	49%	45%
Research 2000	October 17, 2006	49%	44%
Des Moines Register	October 14, 2006	46%	39%
Rasmussen	October 5, 2006	42%	42%
Des Moines Register	September 17, 2006	44%	44%
Research 2000	September 14, 2006	48%	43%
Zogby/WSJ	September 11, 2006	43%	46%
Rasmussen	September 1, 2006	42%	40%
Zogby/WSJ	August 28, 2006	48%	45%
Rasmussen	August 3, 2006	41%	38%
Zogby/WSJ	July 24, 2006	45%	47%
Zogby/WSJ	June 21, 2006	46%	47%
Research 2000	May 22–24, 2006	49%	41%
Rasmussen	May 2, 2006	46%	40%
Rasmussen	April 5, 2006	40%	38%
Rasmussen	February 15, 2006	41%	40%
Rasmussen	January 12, 2006	40%	40%
Rasmussen	November 28, 2005	41%	38%

=== Endorsements ===
Chet Culver (D)

Individuals

- Wesley Clark, general, 2004 Democratic presidential candidate

=== Results ===
Iowa gubernatorial election, 2006
Party	Candidate	Votes	%	±%
Democratic	Chet Culver	569,021	54.02%	+1.33%
Republican	Jim Nussle	467,425	44.38%	−0.13%
Green	Wendy Barth	7,850	0.75%	−0.68%
Libertarian	Kevin Litten	5,735	0.54%	−0.74%
Socialist Workers	Mary Martin	1,974	0.19%	
Write-ins		1,250	0.12%	
Majority		101,596	9.65%	+1.48%
Turnout		1,053,255		
Democratic hold		Swing		

==== Counties that flipped from Democratic to Republican ====
- Audubon (largest city: Audubon)
- Carroll (largest city: Carroll)
- Cherokee (largest city: Cherokee)
- Dallas (largest city: Waukee)
- Delaware (largest city: Manchester)
- Guthrie (largest city: Guthrie Center)
- Greene (largest city: Jefferson)
- Monona (largest city: Onawa)

==== Counties that flipped from Republican to Democratic ====
- Allamakee (largest city: Waukon)
- Hancock (largest city: Garner)
- Iowa (largest city: Williamsburg)
- Jefferson (largest city: Fairfield)
- Madison (largest city: Winterset)
- Winneshiek (largest city: Decorah)
- Woodbury (largest city: Sioux City)
- Louisa (largest city: Wapello)
- Sac (largest city: Sac City)
- Calhoun (largest city: Rockwell City)

==== By congressional district ====
Culver won four of five congressional districts, including one that elected a Republican.

District	Culver	Nussle	Representative
1st	58%	41%	Jim Nussle (109th Congress)
1st	58%	41%	Bruce Braley (110th Congress)
2nd	60%	38%	Jim Leach (109th Congress)
2nd	60%	38%	Dave Loebsack (110th Congress)
3rd	54%	44%	Leonard Boswell
4th	54%	45%	Tom Latham
5th	43%	55%	Steve King

== See also ==
- 2006 United States gubernatorial elections
- Governors of Iowa
