= Jim Nussle =

American businessman and politician (born 1960)

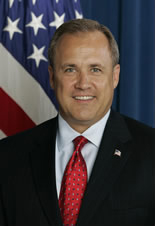

36th Director of the Office of Management and Budget
- In office September 10, 2007 – January 20, 2009
- President: George W. Bush
- Deputy: Stephen McMillin
- Preceded by: Rob Portman
- Succeeded by: Peter Orszag

Chair of the House Budget Committee
- In office January 3, 2001 – January 3, 2007
- Preceded by: John Kasich
- Succeeded by: John Spratt

Member of the U.S. House of Representatives from Iowa
- In office January 3, 1991 – January 3, 2007
- Preceded by: Tom Tauke
- Succeeded by: Bruce Braley
- Constituency: 2nd district (1991–2003); 1st district (2003–2007)

Personal details
- Born: James Allen Nussle; June 27, 1960 (age 66) Des Moines, Iowa, U.S.
- Party: Republican (before 2021); Independent (2021–present)
- Spouse(s): Leslie Nussle (div. 1996) Karen Nussle
- Education: Luther College (BA); Drake University (JD)
- Nussle's voice Nussle supporting the Legislative Line Item Veto Act of 2006. Recorded June 22, 2006

James Allen Nussle (born June 27, 1960) is an American businessman and retired politician who was president and chief executive officer of the Credit Union National Association from 2014 to 2024 and of its successor group America's Credit Unions since 2024. Nussle served as a Republican member of the United States House of Representatives from 1991 to 2007 and was the Republican nominee for the 2006 Iowa gubernatorial election, losing to Democrat Chet Culver. He was then appointed director of the Office of Management and Budget (OMB) in 2007 by President George W. Bush, an office he retained until 2009.

== Early life and career ==
Nussle was born in Des Moines, Iowa. After high school, Nussle studied in Denmark. He then received a B.A. in international studies, political science, and economics from Luther College in 1983, and a J.D. degree from Drake University in Des Moines in 1985. After graduation from Drake University law school, Nussle was elected as the Delaware County, Iowa attorney in Manchester.

== Political career ==
=== Congressional career ===
In 1990, then 2nd congressional district representative, Tom Tauke, ran against Senator Tom Harkin. Nussle ran as the Republican candidate for Tauke's House seat against Eric Tabor and won.

In 1992, as a result of redistricting, Nussle's district was merged with the 3rd congressional district of Democrat David R. Nagle. Nussle defeated Nagle and won reelection.

Nussle's first exposure to national attention came when he made a speech from the well of the House while wearing a paper bag over his head to protest the "shameful" ethical behavior involved in the House banking scandal.

He became Chairman of the House Budget Committee in 2001, the first Iowan to serve as chair of the committee. His position brought national and international interest to his district, including the ONE Campaign, the lobbying group formed by Bono of the rock band U2. The group has targeted Nussle's district with billboard and radio ads. On March 23, 2006, they placed a statement in Nussle's article on English Wikipedia, regarding poverty in Africa and Nussle's budget influence, hoping to influence Nussle. The statement was quickly removed by editors as it violated English Wikipedia policies on maintaining a neutral point of view. On March 24, 2006, The Des Moines Register contained a story about this revision in which ONE confirmed that they had placed the statement.

Nussle's voting record was relatively conservative, despite representing a district with a slight Democratic lean. He had a lifetime rating of 85 from the American Conservative Union. His district has voted for the Democratic presidential candidate in every election since 1988. Typical conservative positions Nussle embraced are supporting restrictions on abortion and supporting President Bush's tax cuts. His district was renumbered as the 1st District as a result of the 2000s (decade) round of redistricting, and became even more Democratic with the addition of much of Iowa's share of the Quad Cities. However, Nussle was reelected handily in 2002 and 2004.

=== 2006 gubernatorial bid ===
When Iowa Governor Tom Vilsack announced that he would not seek a third term in 2006, a number of people from both parties began exploring running for the governorship. That included Nussle, who began considering a run shortly after Vilsack made his announcement. On June 2, 2005, Nussle announced he would run for the position. His only serious primary challenger, Bob Vander Plaats, withdrew from the race to endorse Nussle and become his running mate.

On February 21, 2006, the Iowa Democratic Party filed an ethics complaint against Nussle for not reporting any in-kind donations from the federal "Nussle for Congress Committee". On July 12, 2006, the Iowa Ethics and Campaign Disclosure Board unanimously voted to close the investigation with a finding of no probable cause to believe that a violation of a statute or rule under the board's jurisdiction occurred.

On June 6, 2006, Nussle won the Republican primary, but lost the general election to Iowa Secretary of State Chet Culver on November 7 by a wide margin. After the defeat, he first started his own consulting business. In 2007, he was nominated to become Director of the Office of Management and Budget by President Bush.

Three Republicans and four Democrats announced their intentions to seek the House seat Nussle was vacating in January, 2007. The primaries pared the candidates down to Democrat Bruce Braley and Republican Mike Whalen. Braley won Nussle's former seat.

=== OMB Director ===
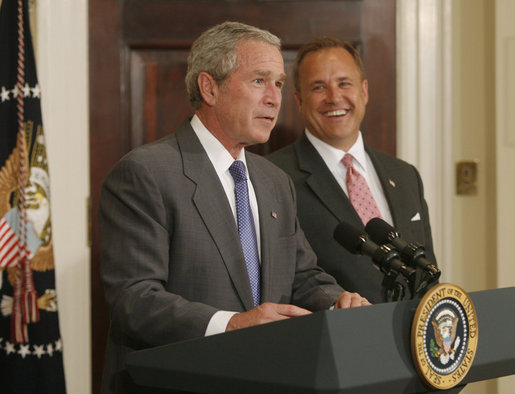
Nussle with President George W. Bush in 2007

Nussle was nominated by George W. Bush to replace Rob Portman as OMB Director. He was sworn in on September 10, 2007. A March 9, 2005 quote of Nussle's was included in the 2006 World Almanac and Book of Facts's list of notable quotes in 2005 (p. 39): "Everyone wants to get to heaven, but no one wants to die." According to the almanac, the quote refers to opposition to his proposed budget, which included cuts to several earmarks and programs; the statement was made during Nussle's tenure as House Budget Committee Chairman.

== Post-political career ==
After leaving the Bush administration in January 2009, Nussle founded the Nussle Group, a media and strategic consulting firm. In November 2010, Nussle became president and COO of Growth Energy. In September 2014, it was announced that he would become the president and chief executive officer of the Credit Union National Association, a trade group for credit unions.

In 2021, Nussle said that he would no longer affiliate with the Republican Party, following the January 6 United States Capitol attack.

== Election history ==
- For the United States House of Representatives
  - 1990: defeated Eric Tabor 50% to 49.8%
  - 1992: defeated David R. Nagle 51% to 49%
  - 1994: defeated David R. Nagle 56% to 43%
  - 1996: defeated Donna Smith 51% to 48%
  - 1998: defeated Rob Tully 55% to 44%
  - 2000: defeated Donna Smith 55% to 44%
  - 2002: defeated Ann Hutchinson 57% to 43%
  - 2004: defeated Bill Gluba 55% to 44%
- For Governor of Iowa
  - 2006: lost to Chet Culver 44% to 53%

U.S. House of Representatives
Preceded by Tom Tauke	Member of the U.S. House of Representatives from Iowa's 2nd congressional district 1991–2003	Succeeded by Jim Leach
Preceded by Jim Leach	Member of the U.S. House of Representatives from Iowa's 1st congressional district 2003–2007	Succeeded by Bruce Braley
Preceded by John Kasich	Chair of the House Budget Committee; 2001–2007	Succeeded by John Spratt
Honorary titles
Preceded by Susan Molinari	Baby of the House; 1991–1993	Succeeded by Cleo Fields
Party political offices
Preceded by Doug Gross	Republican nominee for Governor of Iowa; 2006	Succeeded by Terry Branstad
Political offices
Preceded by Rob Portman	Director of the Office of Management and Budget; 2007–2009	Succeeded by Peter Orszag
U.S. order of precedence (ceremonial)
Preceded by Kenny Marchant as Former U.S. Representative	Order of precedence of the United States as Former U.S. Representative	Succeeded by Steve Gunderson as Former U.S. Representative
