= Tom Vilsack =

American politician (born 1950)

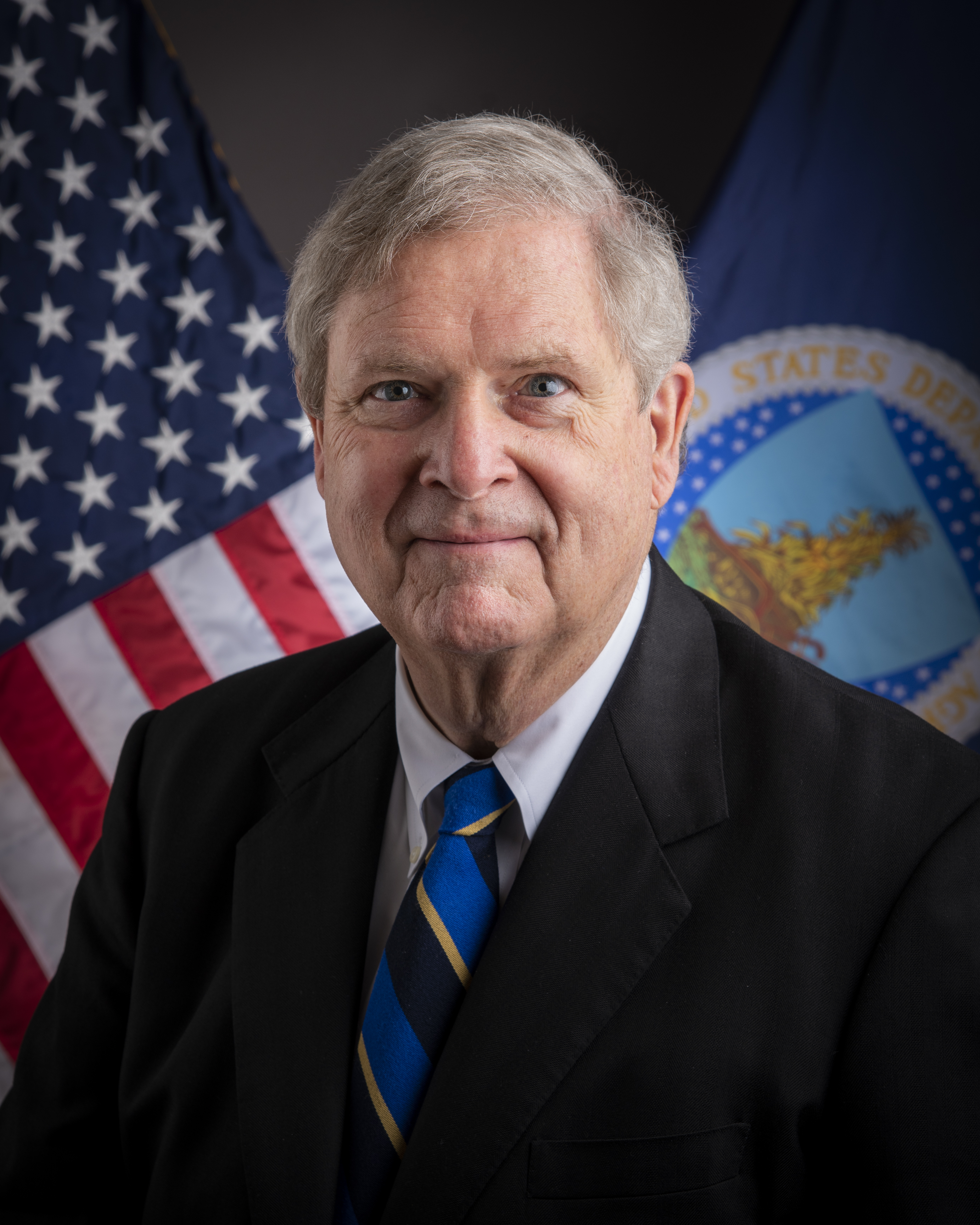
- Official portrait, 2021

30th and 32nd United States Secretary of Agriculture
- In office February 24, 2021 – January 20, 2025
- President: Joe Biden
- Deputy: Jewel H. Bronaugh; Xochitl Torres Small
- Preceded by: Sonny Perdue
- Succeeded by: Brooke Rollins
- In office January 20, 2009 – January 13, 2017
- President: Barack Obama
- Deputy: Kathleen Merrigan; Krysta Harden; Michael Scuse (acting)
- Preceded by: Ed Schafer
- Succeeded by: Sonny Perdue

40th Governor of Iowa
- In office January 15, 1999 – January 12, 2007
- Lieutenant: Sally Pederson
- Preceded by: Terry Branstad
- Succeeded by: Chet Culver

Member of the Iowa Senate from the 49th district
- In office January 11, 1993 – January 11, 1999
- Preceded by: Jack W. Hester
- Succeeded by: Mark Shearer

Mayor of Mount Pleasant
- In office 1987–1992
- Preceded by: Richard Elefson
- Succeeded by: Stanley Hill

Personal details
- Born: Thomas James Vilsack; December 13, 1950 (age 75) Pittsburgh, Pennsylvania, U.S.
- Party: Democratic
- Spouse: Christie Bell (m. 1973)
- Children: 2
- Education: Hamilton College (BA); Albany Law School (JD)
- Vilsack's voice Vilsack on free school meals for students and declining hunger rates. Recorded May 5, 2021

Thomas James Vilsack (/ˈvɪlsæk/; born December 13, 1950) is an American politician. He served as the 30th and 32nd United States Secretary of Agriculture from 2009 to 2017, during the Barack Obama administration, and again from 2021 to 2025 during the Joe Biden administration. A member of the Democratic Party, he served as the 40th Governor of Iowa from 1999 to 2007.

On November 30, 2006, he formally launched his candidacy for the Democratic presidential nomination in the 2008 election, but ended his bid on February 23, 2007. President-elect Barack Obama announced Vilsack's selection to be Secretary of Agriculture on December 17, 2008. His nomination was unanimously confirmed on January 20, 2009 by the United States Senate. Until his resignation on January 13, 2017, one week prior to the end of Obama's second term as president, he had been the only member of the U.S. Cabinet who had served since the day Obama took office.

On July 19, 2016, The Washington Post reported that Vilsack was on Hillary Clinton's two-person shortlist to be her running mate for that year's presidential election. U.S. Senator Tim Kaine from Virginia was ultimately selected. On December 10, 2020, President-elect Joe Biden announced his intention to nominate Vilsack to once again serve as secretary of agriculture in the incoming Biden administration. On February 23, 2021, Vilsack was confirmed by the U.S. Senate, the vote, 92–7. Vilsack is the second-longest-serving Secretary of Agriculture, only surpassed by fellow Iowan James "Tama Jim" Wilson.

== Early life and education ==
Vilsack was born on December 13, 1950, in a Catholic orphanage in Pittsburgh, Pennsylvania, where his 23-year-old birth mother (a secretary) had lived since September 1950 under the pseudonym of "Gloria"; he was baptized as "Kenneth". He was adopted in 1951 by a real-estate agent and insurance salesman, Bud Vilsack (1915-1972), and his wife Dolly Vilsack (1920-1977). They re-named him Thomas James. The Vilsacks had a daughter, Alice (1944-1990), who died two years after a heart transplant when her body eventually rejected the organ.

Vilsack attended Shady Side Academy, a preparatory high school in Pittsburgh. He received a bachelor's degree in 1972 from Hamilton College. While at Hamilton, he joined the Delta Upsilon fraternity. On August 18, 1973, he married Ann Christine "Christie" Bell. He received a Juris Doctor from Albany Law School in 1975.

== Mayor of Mount Pleasant & Iowa Senate ==
Tom Vilsack moved to Mount Pleasant, Iowa after his marriage. Vilsack raised funds to rebuild an athletic facility for young people. In a 2016 interview, he describes himself "as the Jerry Lewis of Mount Pleasant for a couple days" when he hosted a pledge drive on the local radio station to raise the funds. This led him to involvement in the local Chamber of Commerce and United Way. He and his wife volunteered in the failed 1988 presidential campaign of then senator Joe Biden.

After the mayor of Mount Pleasant was gunned down in December 1986, Vilsack led a fundraising drive to build a memorial fountain. The mayor's father asked Vilsack to run for mayor of Mount Pleasant; he was elected and began serving in 1987.

Vilsack was elected to the Iowa Senate in 1992. He began by working on legislation requiring companies that received state tax incentives to provide better pay and benefits. He helped pass a law for workers to receive health coverage when changing jobs and helped redesign Iowa's Workforce Development Department. He also wrote a bill to have the State of Iowa assume a 50% share of local county mental health costs.

== Governor of Iowa (1999-2007) ==
In 1998, Terry Branstad chose not to seek re-election after 16 years as governor. The Iowa Republican Party nominated Jim Ross Lightfoot, a former U.S. Representative. Vilsack defeated former Iowa Supreme Court Justice Mark McCormick in the Democratic primary and chose Sally Pederson as his running mate. Lightfoot was the odds-on favorite to succeed Branstad and polls consistently showed him in the lead. However, Vilsack won the general election by 55,444 votes and became the first Democrat to serve as governor of Iowa in thirty years and only the fifth Democrat to hold the office in the 20th century.

In 2000, he signed a bill helping to create the first organ donor registry in Iowa.

Vilsack remained neutral during the 2000 contest for the Democratic presidential nomination between Vice President Al Gore and former Senator Bill Bradley

In 2002, he won his second term as Governor by defeating Republican challenger attorney Doug Gross by 83,837 votes.

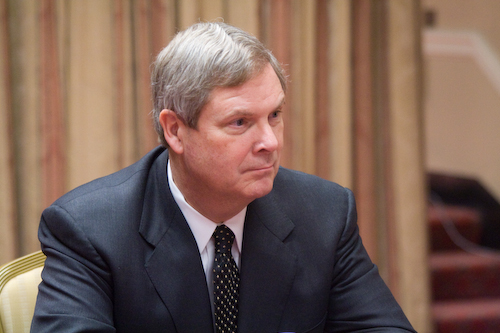
Governor Tom Vilsack in 2008

In the first year of his second term, Vilsack used a line-item veto, later ruled unconstitutional by the Iowa Supreme Court, to create the Grow Iowa Values Fund, a $503 million appropriation designed to boost the Iowa economy by offering grants to corporations and initiatives pledged to create higher-income jobs. He vetoed portions of the bill that would have cut income taxes and ease business regulations. After a special session of the Iowa General Assembly on September 7, 2004, $100 million in state money was set aside to honor previously made commitments. The Grow Iowa Values Fund was reinstated at the end of the 2005 session: under the current law, $50 million per year will be set aside over the next ten years.

For most of Vilsack's tenure as governor, Republicans held effective majorities in the Iowa General Assembly. Following the November 2, 2004, elections, the fifty-member Senate was evenly split between Democrats and Republicans, and Republicans held a 51–49 majority in the House of Representatives.

In July 2005, Vilsack signed an executive order allowing all felons who had served their sentences to vote. Approximately 115,000 felons regained their voting rights. He said: "When you've paid your debt to society, you need to be reconnected and re-engaged to society." Previously, convicted felons were disenfranchised, but could petition the governor to initiate a process, normally requiring six months, to restore their right to vote.

During the 2005 legislative session, Vilsack signed legislation designed to reduce methamphetamine use. It imposed greater restrictions on products containing the active ingredient pseudoephedrine, requiring them to be sold behind pharmacy counters rather than via open-access. It required purchasers to show identification and sign a logbook. It took effect on May 21, 2005.

Following the U.S. Supreme Court decision in Kelo v. City of New London in June 2005, Vilsack vetoed a bill to restrict Iowa's use of eminent domain, citing its potential for negative impact on job creation. He said: "You have an interesting balance between job growth, which everybody supports, and restricting the power of government, which a lot of people support." His veto was overridden by the legislature.

Vilsack is a former member of the National Governors Association Executive Committee. He was chair of the Democratic Governors Association in 2004. He was also chair of the Governors Biotechnology Partnership, the Governors Ethanol Coalition, and the Midwest Governors Conference, and has also been chair and vice-chair of the National Governors Association's committee on Natural Resources, where he worked to develop the NGA's farm and energy policies.

Vilsack was thought to be high on the list of potential running mates for Kerry in the 2004 presidential election. In 2005, Vilsack established Heartland PAC, a political action committee aimed at electing Democratic governors. In the first report, he raised over half a million dollars. Vilsack left office in 2007; he did not seek a third term and was succeeded by Secretary of State, and fellow Democrat Chet Culver.

== 2008 U.S. presidential campaign ==
On November 30, 2006, Tom Vilsack became the second Democrat (after Mike Gravel) to officially announce intentions to run for the presidency in the 2008 election. In his announcement speech, he said "America's a great country, and now I have the opportunity to begin the process, the legal process of filing papers to run for President of the United States." Vilsack dropped out of the race on February 23, 2007, citing monetary constraints.

Vilsack's campaign logo

Vilsack's campaign made significant use of social media by maintaining an active MySpace profile, a collection of viral video clips on YouTube, a Facebook profile, videoblog on blip.tv, and a conference call with the podcast site TalkShoe. On January 27, 2007, Vilsack called in to Kurt Hurner's Regular Guys Show for a 15‑minute interview on his hope for the Democratic nomination for 2008. Since then, Vilsack appeared again on the show, now The Kurt Hurner Show at Talk Shoe on August 12, 2008, this time as a supporter of Barack Obama for president fielding questions from callers for 30 minutes.

During the campaign, Vilsack joined fellow candidates Hillary Clinton and Joe Biden in supporting the establishment of a U.S. Public Service Academy as a civilian counterpart to the military academies.

Shortly after ending his 2008 bid for the White House, Vilsack endorsed Senator Hillary Clinton and was named the national co-chair for Clinton's presidential campaign.

=== Views on Iraq ===
Vilsack was critical of President Bush's execution of the war in Iraq, but he hesitated to call for an immediate complete pullout of U.S. forces: "I don't think we're losing in Iraq. It appears to be a draw. People are upset by the fact that their kids are over there and there doesn't seem to be any end to this whole process. It's not pacifism that makes people think this way. They're questioning the credibility and competence of the Commander-in-Chief."

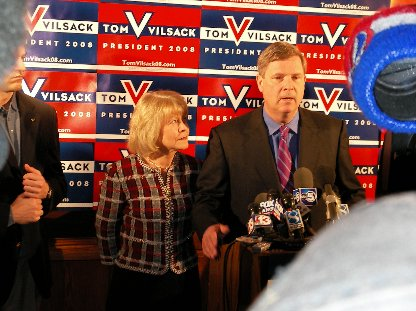
Vilsack announces his withdrawal from the 2008 presidential race

On December 5, Vilsack announced that he favored withdrawing most U.S. forces from Iraq and leaving a small force in the northern region for a limited period. He said U.S. forces provided the Iraqi government with "both a crutch and an excuse" for inaction. He said U.S. withdrawal "may very well require them to go through some chaotic and very difficult times", but that he believed it the only way to force the Iraqi government to take control of the country.

=== Views on energy security ===
The Vilsack Energy Security Agenda set out a strategy to dramatically reduce U.S. reliance on foreign energy and to cut the United States' carbon emissions. It also called for replacing the Department of Energy with a new Department of Energy Security. This department would oversee and redefine the federal government's role in energy policy. The reorganized department would have acted as an institutional advocate for innovation in the energy policy and was intended to ensure accountability as the nation works towards achieving its energy security goals. America's overriding objective in energy policy would have been to make America the unquestioned leader in clean energy, enhancing national security and economic strength.

In a 2007 lecture to the Commonwealth Club of California, Vilsack stated:

Iowa is one of the nation's leading producers of corn-based ethanol, and many people in my state have an economic stake in the expanded use of corn-based ethanol. But the reality is that corn-based ethanol will never be enough to reach our goals. Some have suggested that we import more sugar-based ethanol from Brazil and we should indeed consider all sources of available ethanol ... but if we are going to create energy security we can't simply replace one imported source of energy with another. That alone is not security ... the only way we can produce enough domestically is if we greatly improve the technology used to produce cellulosic ethanol.

== U.S. Secretary of Agriculture (2009–2017) ==
=== Appointment ===
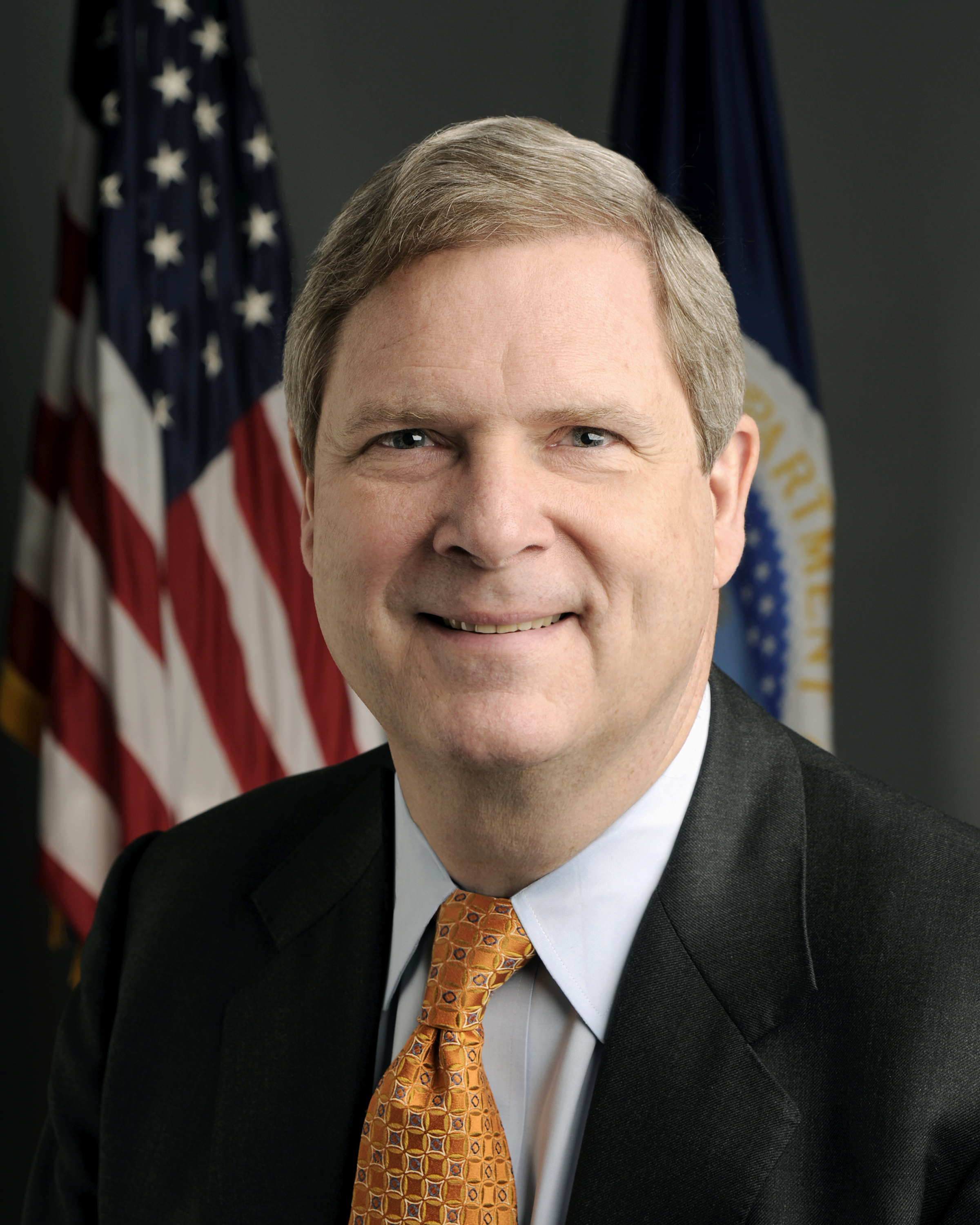
Vilsack's 2009 official portrait during his first tenure as Agriculture secretary

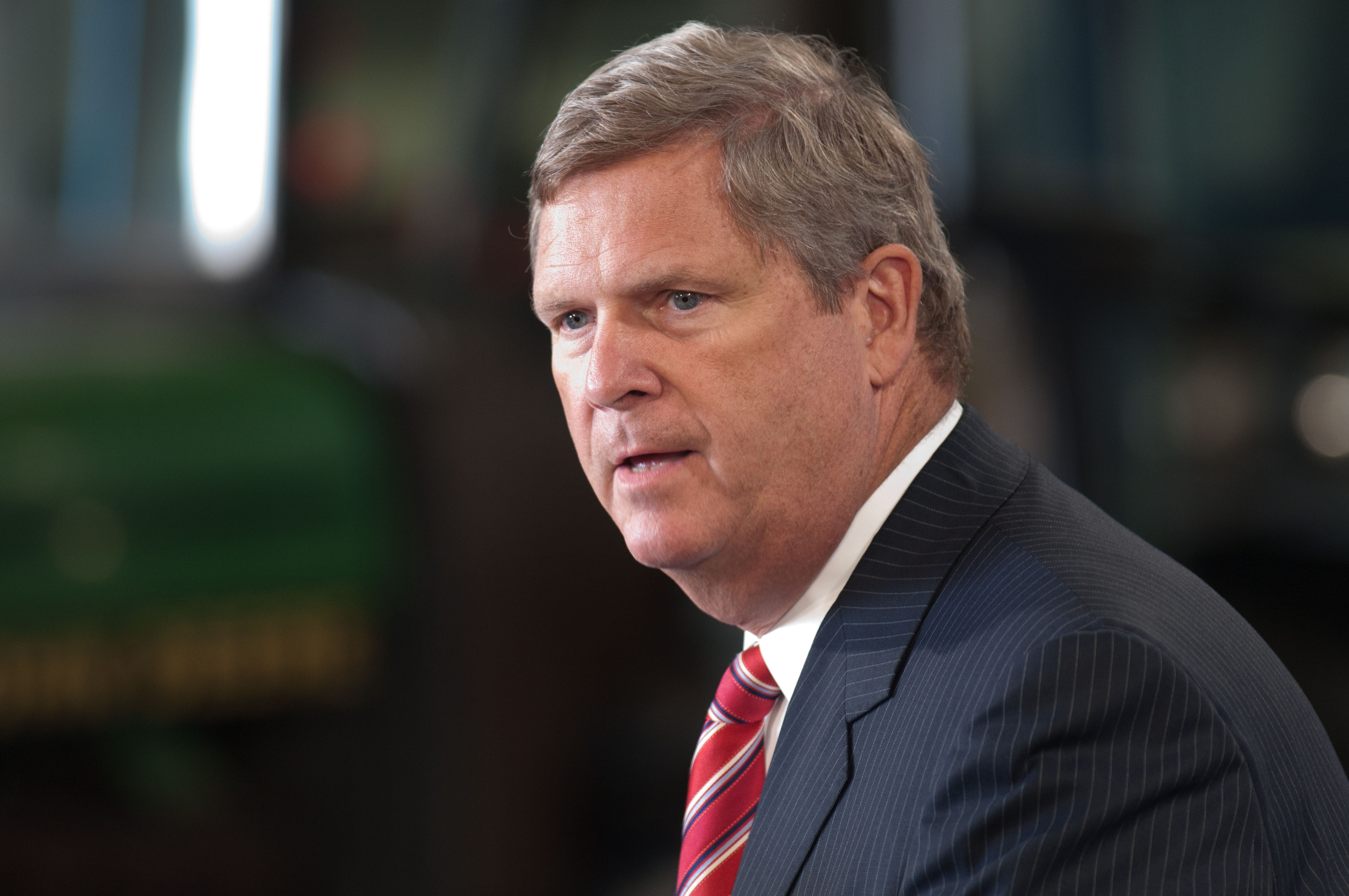
Vilsack introduces President Barack Obama at the Northeast Iowa Community College, for a White House Rural Economic Forum on August 16, 2011.

On December 17, 2008, President-elect Barack Obama announced his choice of Vilsack as the nominee to be the 30th Secretary of Agriculture. Vilsack has governed a largely agricultural state as did the previous two Secretaries of Agriculture, Mike Johanns (who was later a Senator from Nebraska) (2005–2007) and Ed Schafer (2007–2009).

The Senate confirmed Vilsack's nomination for the position by unanimous consent on January 20th, 2009.

Reaction to Vilsack's nomination from agricultural groups was largely positive and included endorsements from the Corn Refiners Association, National Grain and Feed Association, National Farmers Union, American Farm Bureau Federation, and the Environmental Defense Fund. Vilsack was the founder and former chair of the Governor's Biotechnology Partnership, and was named Governor of the Year by the Biotechnology Industry Organization, an industry lobbying group.

=== Actions ===
Vilsack appointed Shirley Sherrod as the Georgia Director of Rural Development, saying she would be an "important advocate on behalf of rural communities". Months after the appointment, Vilsack forced her to resign based on accusations of considering race in the handling of her job responsibilities at a private advocacy firm in 1986. Subsequent reports claimed that Vilsack had overreacted to a selectively edited tape of a speech that Sherrod had given to the NAACP. The edited tape had been posted online by conservative blogger Andrew Breitbart. Vilsack expressed his "deep regret" to Sherrod in acting hastily.

On January 24, 2012, Obama appointed Vilsack the designated survivor during the President's State of the Union address.

=== Beef advocacy ===
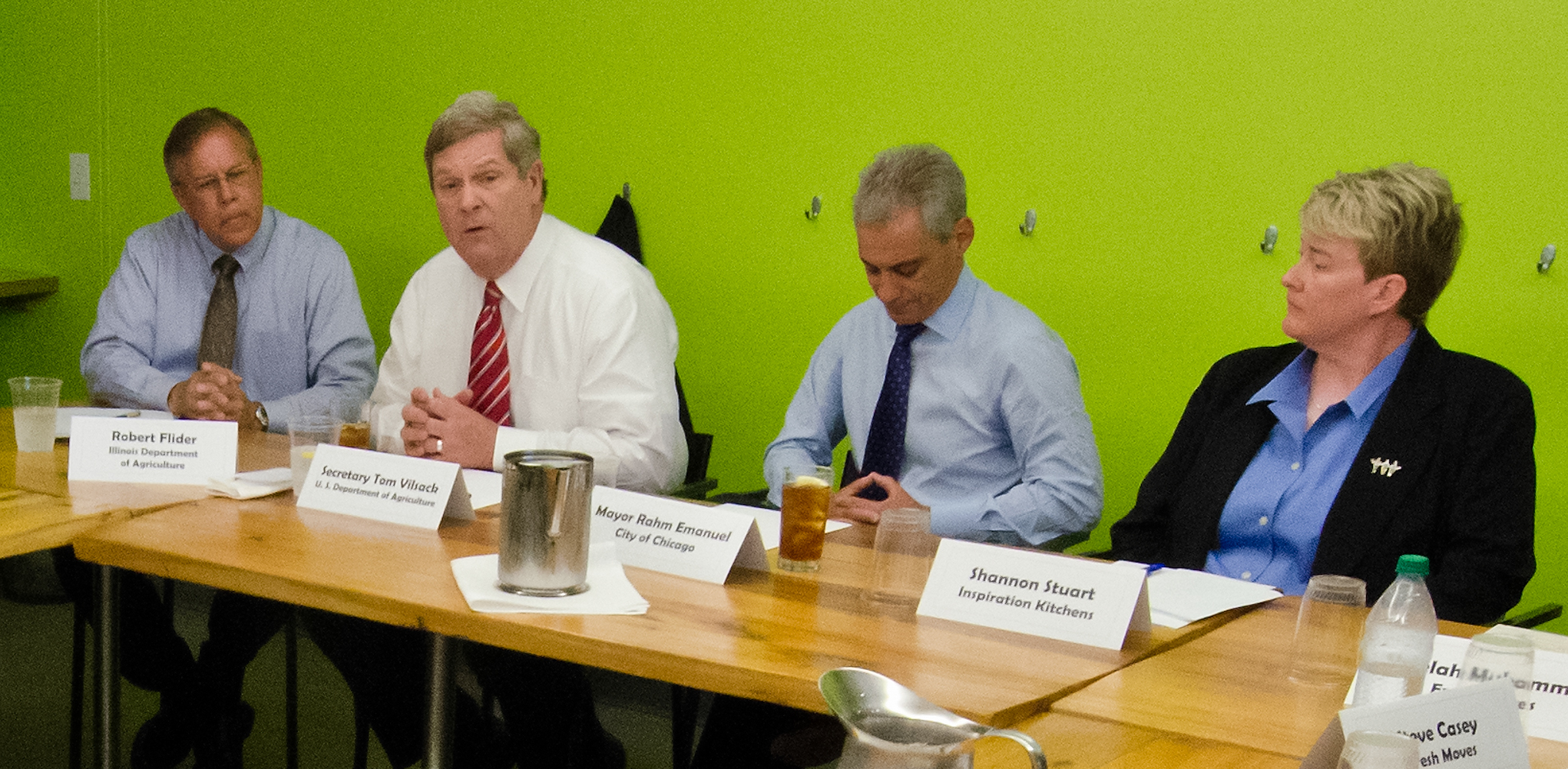
Vilsack at a Chicago round table with Mayor of Chicago Rahm Emanuel and Director of the Illinois Department of Agriculture Robert Flider on June 8, 2012

In March 2012, Vilsack joined three midwest governors in a campaign to defend the use of a processed beef product made from trimmings left after beef carcasses are butchered, dubbed "pink slime" by its critics. He said "it's safe, it contains less fat and historically it's been less expensive" and it should be available to consumers and school districts.

=== Global warming ===
At a Drake University forum on climate change on April 22nd, 2014, Vilsack stated "agriculture tends to take the brunt of criticism about climate change, but the industry contributes only 9 percent of the greenhouse gases blamed for a warming planet" and that while there were "challenges globally in terms of agriculture and its contribution to greenhouse gas emissions that's not necessarily the case in the United States."

During his second tenure as secretary, Vilsack announced the Partnerships for Climate-Smart Commodities program, which invested over $3.1 billion into projects that expand markets for commodities produced with climate-friendly practices.

=== Considered resignation ===
In 2015, Vilsack told Obama he was considering resigning. The Washington Post reported that he said, "There are days when I have literally nothing to do" as he thought to quit. Obama asked Vilsack to remain and to look into the problem of opioid addiction.

== Between cabinet tenures ==
Shortly after his tenure ended, Vilsack released a statement in support of his succession by Sonny Perdue as the Secretary of Agriculture, making Perdue the only cabinet member nominee to receive a public statement of support from an Obama cabinet member. He was mentioned as a possible candidate for the Senate in 2020, for the seat currently held by Republican incumbent Joni Ernst, but declined to run.

In February 2017, Vilsack became president and CEO of the US Dairy Export Council.

Vilsack endorsed Joe Biden in the 2020 Democratic Party presidential primaries.

== U.S. Secretary of Agriculture (2021–2025) ==
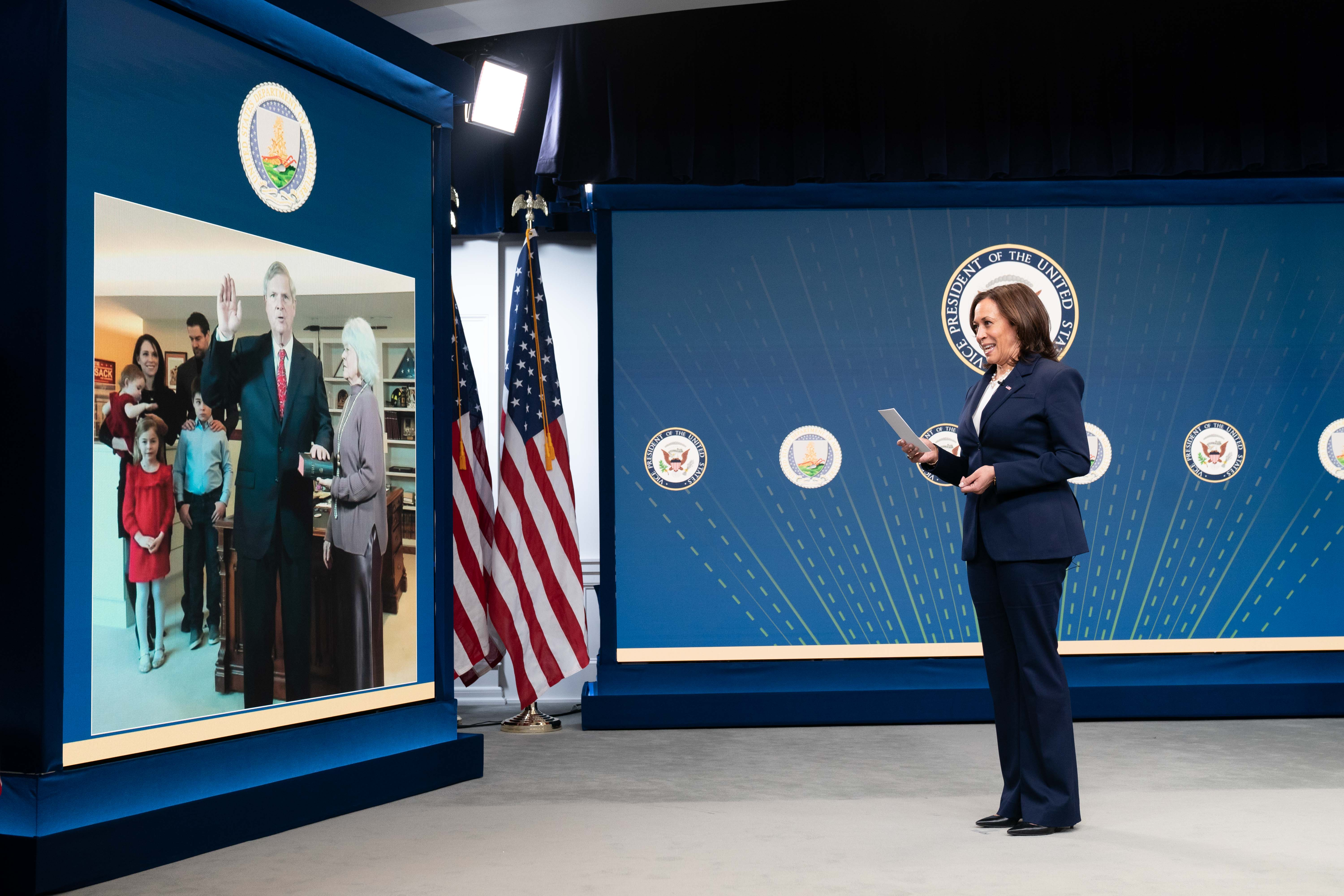
Vilsack is sworn in for the second time as agriculture secretary by Vice President Kamala Harris, February 24, 2021.

=== Nomination and confirmation ===
In December 2020, Joe Biden announced he would nominate Vilsack to again serve as the secretary of agriculture. The move was met by criticism from some black farmers and progressives, because of Vilsack's perceived relationship with the status quo and corporate agriculture. He appeared before the Senate Agriculture Committee on February 2nd, 2021, and was unanimously approved. His nomination was confirmed by the Senate on February 23rd, 2021, by a vote of 92–7. He was sworn into office by Kamala Harris on February 24th, 2021.

=== Tenure ===
The USDA implemented new rules to limit how much sugar can be in school meals.

During his tenure, Vilsack announced that the USDA would leverage $100 million in funding from the American Rescue Plan Act to expand America's meat processing capacity. In 2024, "more than $35 million in grants were approved for 15 independent meat processors in 12 states to increase processing capacity, spur competition, to expand market opportunities for U.S. farmers, and create jobs in rural areas."

==== Forestry protection ====
The USDA also made investments into state forestry departments across the nation to help by allocating $1.25 billion to "plant and maintain new trees to reduce extreme heat, benefit health and improve access to nature" and directed $930 million to reduce wildfires in western states, which was accomplished by clearing trees and underbrush in national forests. In 2024, "The U.S. Department of Agriculture announced up to $7.7 billion in assistance for fiscal year 2025 to help agricultural and forestry producers adopt conservation practices on working lands. This includes up to $5.7 billion for climate-smart practices, made possible by the Inflation Reduction Act, which is part of President Biden’s Investing in America Agenda and $2 billion in Farm Bill funding."

==== Rural internet ====
Vilsack helped expand high speed internet across the nation, as part of a "$65 billion push for high-speed connectivity" from the 2021 Infrastructure Investment and Jobs Act.

== Post-government career ==
After his second tenure as Secretary of Agriculture, the World Food Prize Foundation named Vilsack as their new CEO starting on March 1, 2025 succeeding fellow former Iowa Governor Terry Branstad.

== Personal life ==
Vilsack met his wife, Ann Christine "Christie" Bell, in a cafeteria while at Hamilton College in New York in October 1968. Vilsack approached her and asked, "Are you a Humphrey or a Nixon supporter?" She replied "Humphrey" and they soon began dating. On August 18, 1973, the couple was married in Christie Vilsack's hometown of Mount Pleasant, Iowa. The couple moved to Mount Pleasant in 1975, where he joined his father-in-law's law practice.

Tom and Christie Vilsack have two sons, Jess and Doug.

In May 2017, Vilsack's five-year-old granddaughter, Ella, died of complications from influenza.

Vilsack won $150,000 in the Powerball in 2020.

== Electoral history ==
- 1992 election for Iowa State Senate, 49th District:

Democratic primary

- Tom Vilsack (D), 100.0%

1992 general election:

- Tom Vilsack (D), 50.1% – 12,544 votes
- Dave Heaton (R), 42.1% – 10,551 votes
- Dan Reed (I), 7.8% – 1,945 votes

- 1994 election for Iowa State Senate, 49th District:

Democratic primary

- Tom Vilsack (D), 99.9% – 1,201 votes
- scattering, 0.1% – 1 vote

1994 general election:

- Tom Vilsack (D), 98.8% – 12,288 votes
- scattering, 1.2% – 145 votes

- Democratic primary results
  Party	Candidate	Votes	%
  Democratic	Tom Vilsack	59,130	51.20
  Democratic	Mark McCormick	55,950	48.45
  Democratic	Write-ins	410	0.36
  Total votes		115,490	100.00

Iowa gubernatorial election, 1998
Party	Candidate	Votes	%	±%
Democratic	Tom Vilsack	500,231	52.30%	+10.74%
Republican	Jim Ross Lightfoot	444,787	46.51%	−10.29%
Reform	Jim Hennager	5,606	0.59%	
Natural Law	Jim Schaefer	3,144	0.33%	−0.05%
Independent	Mark Kennis	2,006	0.21%	
Write-ins		641	0.07%	
Majority		55,444	5.80%	−9.44%
Turnout		956,415		
Democratic gain from Republican		Swing		

Democratic primary results
Party	Candidate	Votes	%
Democratic	Tom Vilsack (incumbent)	79,277	98.55
Democratic	Write-ins	1,166	1.45
Total votes		80,443	100

Iowa gubernatorial election, 2002
Party	Candidate	Votes	%	±%
Democratic	Tom Vilsack (incumbent)	540,449	52.69%	+0.39%
Republican	Doug Gross	456,612	44.51%	−2.00%
Green	Jay Robinson	14,628	1.43%	
Libertarian	Clyde Cleveland	13,098	1.28%	
Write-ins		1,025	0.10%	
Majority		83,837	8.17%	+2.37%
Turnout		1,025,802		
Democratic hold		Swing		

== See also ==
- List of United States Cabinet members who have served more than eight years

Party political offices
Preceded by Bonnie Campbell	Democratic nominee for Governor of Iowa; 1998, 2002	Succeeded by Chet Culver
Preceded by Gary Locke	Chair of the Democratic Governors Association; 2003–2004	Succeeded by Bill Richardson
Preceded by Evan Bayh	Chair of the Democratic Leadership Council; 2005–2007	Succeeded by Harold Ford
Political offices
Preceded by Terry Branstad	Governor of Iowa; 1999–2007	Succeeded by Chet Culver
Preceded by Ed Schafer	United States Secretary of Agriculture; 2009–2017	Succeeded by Sonny Perdue
Preceded by Sonny Perdue	United States Secretary of Agriculture; 2021–2025	Succeeded by Brooke Rollins
U.S. order of precedence (ceremonial)
Preceded by Ken Salazar as Former U.S. Cabinet Member	Order of precedence of the United States	Succeeded by Steven Chu as Former U.S. Cabinet Member
