= Jim Moseley (American politician) =

American politician

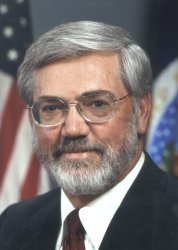

8th United States Deputy Secretary of Agriculture
- In office July 17, 2001 – April 2005
- President: George W. Bush
- Preceded by: Ann Veneman
- Succeeded by: Charles F. Conner

Personal details
- Born: James Moseley; June 2, 1948 (age 78) Indiana, U.S.
- Spouse: Kathryn Maple (m. 1969)
- Children: 7
- Education: Purdue University (BS)

James "Jim" Moseley (born June 2, 1948) is an American farmer and politician who served as the ninth deputy secretary of agriculture from 2001 to 2005 during the administration of President George W. Bush.

== Early life and education ==
Moseley was born in Peru, Indiana on June 2, 1948. He received a Bachelor of Science degree in horticulture from Purdue University in 1973.

== Career ==
A third generation farmer, Moseley owned Ag Ridge Farms in Clarks Hill, Indiana for over thirty years, a 2,800-acre corn and soybean farm, and was also managing partner of Infinity Pork, LLC, raising 50,000 hogs per year. Moseley is a proponent of no-till farming, and has received a reputation as an environmentally-minded farmer.

Moseley served as chairman of the Tippecanoe County Grain Producers steering committee from 1980 to 1984. From 1983 to 1988, Moseley served on the board of trustees of the Tippecanoe School Corporation, including a term as board vice president.

In 1984–85, he was a participant in the Indiana Agriculture Leadership Program, AgrIInstitute. From 1989 to 1990, he served as agricultural advisor to the administrator of the United States Environmental Protection Agency.

Moseley first served at USDA as the Assistant Secretary of Agriculture for Natural Resources and Environment from 1990 to 1992 during the administration of President George H. W. Bush. In this capacity, he provided policy leadership related to the 1990 Farm Bill.

From 1993 to 1995, he served as the director of agricultural services and regulations for the State of Indiana at Purdue University. During this period, he also served as a member of the editorial board of the Farm Journal.

In 1995, Moseley was a senior consultant to the National Association of State Departments of Agriculture, where he helped to develop model resource management plans for farmers. In 1997, Moseley took part in the eight-month National Environmental Dialogue on Pork Production. He served as the lead negotiator for the National Pork Producers Council, where he worked with state and federal officials to develop an environmental recommendations for the American pork industry.

=== Deputy Secretary of Agriculture ===
On July 17, 2001, Moseley was sworn in as the U.S. Deputy Secretary of Agriculture by Secretary Ann Veneman. As deputy secretary, Moseley oversaw the day-to-day operations of the agency and supervised its budget.

Much of Moseley's time in office was spent addressing vulnerabilities in the U.S. food supply after the September 11 attacks, and working to strengthen agricultural infrastructure in Afghanistan. After 9/11, Moseley presided over a national review of the United States food production network, ports of entry, and food-processing plants.

In April 2005, Moseley left his post at the USDA to return to farming full-time. He continued to support USDA for two months as a special advisor on Afghanistan agricultural programs.

Moseley giving a tour of his hydroponics farm to U.S. Soldiers and Airmen with the 3-19th Agribusiness Development Team, 2010

=== Post-USDA ===
Moseley served on the board of the nonprofit American Farmland Trust for six years. Since 2010, Moseley has been the co-chair in Agriculture Policy Development for AGree.

In 2010, Moseley provided soldiers and airmen of the Indiana National Guard with insight on Afghan culture before their scheduled deployment to Afghanistan. In 2024, Moseley was one of the co-founders of the Farm Advisors mentorship program, launched at the Indiana State Fair.

== Personal life ==
Moseley married Kathryn Maple in 1969. They have seven adult children.

== Awards ==
In 1982, Moseley was named as the Jaycees National Outstanding Young Farmer of America.

Moseley was honored as a Purdue Distinguished Agricultural Alumnus in 1992. He is also a recipient of the Indiana Farm Management Association Leadership Award, and the District Soil and Water Conservation Award.

== Works ==
- Production and Conservation - A Reasonable Compromise, 1988

Political offices
Preceded by Richard Rominger	U.S. Deputy Secretary of Agriculture; Served under: George W. Bush; July 17, 2001 – April 2005	Succeeded by Charles F. Conner
