= Brian Baenig =

American government official

Chief of Staff for the United States Secretary of Agriculture
- In office September 17, 2013 – September 18, 2015
- President: Barack Obama
- Leader: Tom Vilsack
- Preceded by: Krysta Harden
- Succeeded by: Karla Thieman

Personal details
- Born: December 13, 1975
- Died: June 23, 2026
- Education: Saint Michael's College (BS)

Brian Baenig was an American government official who served as Chief of Staff for Secretary of Agriculture Tom Vilsack from 2013 to 2015. He died June 23, 2026.

== Education ==
Baenig earned a Bachelor of Science in Political Science from Saint Michael's College.

== Career ==
Baenig began his career as Deputy Staff Director on the United States Senate Committee on Agriculture, Nutrition and Forestry and Senior Policy Advisor to Senator Patrick Leahy. He also worked as a Legislative Assistant for Senator Paul Wellstone.

Baenig served as Assistant Secretary of Agriculture for Congressional Relations at USDA from 2011 to 2013. He had also previously served as Deputy Undersecretary for Marketing and Regulatory Programs from 2009 2011.

After resigning as Secretary of Agriculture's Chief of Staff, Baenig joined the Biotechnology Innovation Organization as executive vice president of the company's Food and Agriculture Section.

Baenig currently serves as President of the U.S. Beet Sugar Association.
