= Jack Parnell (politician) =

American government official (born 1935)

United States Deputy Secretary of Agriculture
- In office April 20, 1989 – May 1, 1991
- President: George H. W. Bush
- Secretary: Clayton Yeutter
- Preceded by: Peter C. Myers
- Succeeded by: Ann Veneman

Personal details
- Born: May 7, 1935 (age 91) Leavenworth, Washington, U.S.
- Party: Republican
- Spouse: Susan Musso
- Children: 3

Jack Callihan Parnell is a former United States Deputy Secretary of Agriculture. He served during the George H. W. Bush administration from 1989 until 1991. He had been Secretary of the California Department of Food and Agriculture from 1987 to 1989, as director of the California Department of Fish and Game from 1984 to 1987, and as deputy secretary of the California Department of Food and Agriculture from 1983 to 1984. He was elected to the board of directors of the Neogen Corporation in October 1993, and as chairman of the board in October 2001. He is also a government relations consultant at Kahn Soares & Conway, LLP.

Before working for the California state government, Jack Parnell was the owner and publisher of California Cattleman Magazine and the founder and chairman of the Auburn Bank of Commerce. He built and operated the Headquarters House Restaurant, the Headquarters House Country Meat Shop, the Angus Hills Golf Course, and Parnell Ranch. He served on the U.S. Trade Representative's Intergovernmental Policy Advisory Committee, on the National American Angus Association Board, on the California Production Credit Association. He was a past president of the California Angus Association and was appointed president of the 20th District Agricultural Association Fair by President Ronald Reagan. He was appointed by Governor George Deukmejian as a member of the Pacific Fisheries Management Council and the Advisory Board on Air Quality and Fuels.

== Personal life ==
Parnell was born in Leavenworth, Washington on May 7, 1935. He graduated from Western College of Auctioneering. Parnell is married to Susan Musso and have 3 children.
