= Dan Glickman =

American businessman and politician

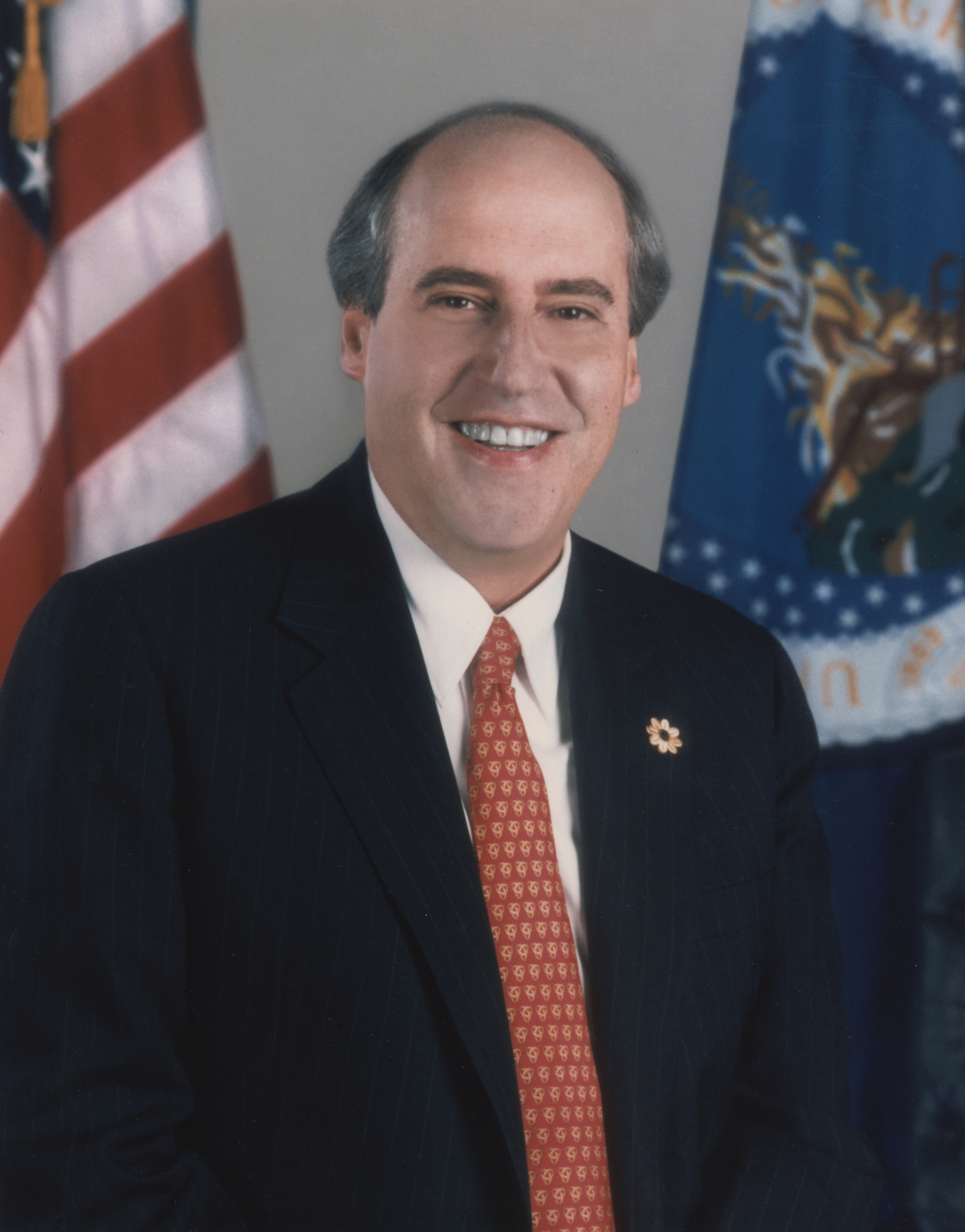

Chairman and Chief Executive Officer of the Motion Picture Association of America
- In office 2004–2010
- Preceded by: Jack Valenti
- Succeeded by: Chris Dodd

26th United States Secretary of Agriculture
- In office March 30, 1995 – January 20, 2001
- President: Bill Clinton
- Deputy: Richard Rominger
- Preceded by: Mike Espy
- Succeeded by: Ann Veneman

Chair of the House Intelligence Committee
- In office January 3, 1993 – January 3, 1995
- Preceded by: Dave McCurdy
- Succeeded by: Larry Combest

Member of the U.S. House of Representatives from Kansas's 4th district
- In office January 3, 1977 – January 3, 1995
- Preceded by: Garner E. Shriver
- Succeeded by: Todd Tiahrt

Personal details
- Born: Daniel Robert Glickman; November 24, 1944 (age 81) Wichita, Kansas, U.S.
- Party: Democratic
- Spouse: Rhoda Yura (m. 1966)
- Children: 2, including Jonathan
- Education: University of Michigan, Ann Arbor (BA); George Washington University (JD)

Daniel Robert Glickman (born November 24, 1944) is an American politician, lawyer, lobbyist, and nonprofit leader. He served as the United States Secretary of Agriculture from 1995 until 2001 in the Bill Clinton administration. He previously represented Kansas's 4th congressional district as a Democrat in the U.S. House of Representatives for 18 years.

Following his departure from public office, Glickman led Harvard University's School of Government and Institute of Politics.

He was chairman and CEO of the Motion Picture Association of America (MPAA) from 2004 to 2010.

He is a Senior Fellow at the Bipartisan Policy Center, where he focuses on public health, national security, and economic policy issues. He also co-chairs BPC's Democracy Project and co-leads the center's Nutrition and Physical Activity Initiative.

He also is or has been on the board of directors of the Chicago Mercantile Exchange, MAZON: A Jewish Response to Hunger, the board of Friends of the World Food Program and is a member of the ReFormers Caucus of Issue One. He also is on the Council on American Politics at the George Washington University Graduate School of Political Management.

== Early life ==
Glickman was born in Wichita, Kansas, on November 24, 1944, the son of Gladys A. (née Kopelman) and Milton Glickman. His family was Jewish. The Glickman family operated Glickman Inc., a full-service scrap metal operation, since 1915 and Kansas Metal, an automobile and appliance shredder, since 1994. Glickman Inc. was founded by Jacob Glickman and later continued and expanded by Milton and Bill Glickman. With the death of Milton Glickman, Dan's father, in December 1999, Dan and his siblings Norman and Sharon Glickman carried on the family business until it was sold in 2002.

Glickman graduated from Wichita Southeast High School in 1962. He graduated from University of Michigan with a B.A. in history in 1966, where he was a classmate with one of Al Gore's chiefs of staff, Charles Burson, and received his J.D. from The George Washington University Law School in 1969. He is married to Rhoda Joyce Yura, with whom he has two children: Jonathan Glickman and Amy Glickman.

== Legal career ==
In 1969 and 1970, Glickman worked as a trial attorney for the U.S. Securities and Exchange Commission, then was a partner in a law firm, Sargent, Klenda and Glickman.

== Political career ==
=== Wichita Public Schools ===
Glickman's first foray into public office was as a publicly elected member of the Wichita School Board, which oversees the Wichita Public Schools (USD-259), one of the nation's largest school districts. Between 1973 and 1976 he was President of the Wichita School Board.

=== U. S. House of Representatives ===
Glickman was elected to the U.S. House of Representatives to represent Kansas's 4th congressional district in 1976, from January 3, 1977 to January 3, 1995, through eight successive re-elections.

==== Election ====
In 1976, in his first congressional race, Glickman was elected to the House of Representatives as a Democrat from Kansas's 4th congressional district, defeating eight-term Republican incumbent Garner Shriver. Glickman held the office for nine consecutive terms.

==== Issues and committees ====
Glickman was active in general aviation policy, and co-wrote the General Aviation Revitalization Act (GARA) – controversial landmark legislation providing product liability protection for small airplane manufacturers (his district has produced most of America's light aircraft).

During his congressional tenure, Glickman was also active in agriculture issues (his district's other major industry), and on the House Agriculture Committee, including six years as chair of the subcommittee overseeing federal farm policy. He was principal author of the 1990 Farm Bill and other legislation. While there, he lobbied for the position of Secretary of Agriculture under President Bill Clinton, losing initially, but winning the post after his tenth-race election ouster from Congress.

In 1986, Glickman was one of the House impeachment managers appointed by the House of Representatives in 1986 to prosecute the case in the impeachment trial of Harry E. Claiborne, judge of the United States District Court for Nevada. Claiborne was found guilty by the United States Senate and removed from his federal judgeship.

In 1993, he was appointed chair of the House Permanent Select Committee on Intelligence of the One Hundred Third Congress, serving one term before his 1994 defeat.

In October 1993, Glickman, representing a district whose second-largest industry was agriculture (particularly wheat production), voted for protectionism over free trade, restricting the importation of Canadian wheat.

On "media freedom" versus "family values" one analyst reported that Glickman, in June 1993, voted to require that television shows have explicit viewer advisories. Glickman would later lead the Motion Picture Association of America (MPAA), which develops such ratings for motion pictures.

In his final term, Glickman was Chairman of the House Permanent Select Committee on Intelligence. He held open hearings to bring the intelligence community's post–Cold War activities to light and began a committee investigation into the Aldrich Ames espionage case. Colleagues from both parties lauded his quiet, non-grandstanding, "careful and considered" leadership of the committee.

On abortion, Glickman straddled the fence, generally accommodating abortion, but voting for the Hyde Amendment that restricted federal funding of abortion. In 1993, while on the House Judiciary Committee, he was absent from a key vote on removing most state abortion restrictions, and said later that he was unsure how he would have voted.

==== Defeat ====
In the Republican-landslide 1994 congressional elections, known as the Republican Revolution, Glickman—in his bid for re-election to a 10th term—was unexpectedly defeated by Goddard Republican Todd Tiahrt.

Glickman later blamed his surprise defeat largely on his own pro-choice positions, which he said opponents used as an "organizing tool" to rally opposition against him from voters who were otherwise politically inactive. In a detailed review of Tiahrt's victory, the Chicago Tribune reported that Glickman's unexpected defeat was largely the product of Tiahrt's recruitment of 1,800 volunteers from churches and anti-abortion groups in their congressional district (which had become the center of the national anti-abortion movement), and from gun-rights organizations.

Another casualty of the 1994 Republican congressional sweep was Glickman's wife, Rhoda, who, for 13 years, had led the Congressional Arts Caucus—one of 28 caucuses soon to be defunded by the incoming Republican Congress.

==== Post-Glickman era ====
As of 2021, no other Democrat has won election to the congressional seat lost by Glickman.

The court-ordered redistricting in 2012 shifted the Fourth District sharply westward, reaching into more conservative Western Kansas.

=== Secretary of Agriculture ===
Following his congressional defeat, Glickman was appointed by President Bill Clinton to be the Secretary of Agriculture, where he served from 1995 to 2001.

Glickman had sought the post previously but initially lost his bid to Mississippi Congressman Mike Espy. Glickman's 1994 appointment to the post followed Espy's departure under ethics concerns. Glickman's Senate confirmation was supported by a powerful Republican, Senate Minority Leader Bob Dole, from Glickman's home state of Kansas.

During Glickman's tenure, he participated in implementation of the Department's controversial HACCP Program to control food safety at U.S. food-processing facilities, some of which was subsequently overturned in the federal court Supreme Beef case.

During President Clinton's February 4, 1997 State of the Union address to Congress, Glickman was the "Designated Survivor".

When Clinton's term ended, Glickman's career in government ended, but was followed by numerous leadership roles in related institutions and organizations.

== Post-government career ==
Following his departure from public office, Glickman held a variety of roles in civic-oriented nonprofits. He is a common media interviewee.

=== Harvard University ===
After Clinton's term ended, Glickman became the head of Harvard University's John F. Kennedy School of Government, and later director of Harvard's Institute of Politics.

=== Aspen Institute ===
Glickman became executive director of the Aspen Institute Congressional Program, a nongovernmental, nonpartisan discussion fellowship for public leaders.

=== George Washington University ===
Glickman is a Senior Fellow at the Bipartisan Policy Center and the Council on American Politics at The Graduate School of Political Management at George Washington University in Washington, D.C., where he teaches.

=== University of Southern California ===
Glickman is a senior fellow of the Center on Communication Leadership and Policy at the USC Annenberg School for Communication and Journalism.

=== Council on Foreign Relations ===
Glickman is a member of the Council on Foreign Relations, America's pre-eminent foreign policy think tank, led by several former U.S. Secretaries of State and other top former national security leaders.

=== CIA Advisor ===
During President Barack Obama's administration, Glickman served on the External Advisory Board to CIA Director Leon Panetta. (Glickman, while in Congress, had chaired the House Permanent Select Committee on Intelligence.)

=== Center for U.S. Global Engagement ===
Glickman is Chair of the U.S. Global Leadership Coalition, at the Center for U.S. Global Engagement.

=== Refugees International ===
Glickman left the Motion Picture Association of America in 2010 to be president of Refugees International. He occupied the post for less than three months.

=== Food and agriculture ===
Glickman's political experience in agriculture led to several post-political roles, including:

- Friedman School of Nutrition Science and Policy: In 2021, Glickman joined the Friedman School of Nutrition Science and Policy at Tufts University as an adjunct professor of the practice, teaching, mentoring, and contributing to the school's advocacy and public impact.
- Chicago Mercantile Exchange: Glickman is on the board of directors
- Food Research and Action Center, a domestic anti-hunger organization
- National 4-H Council, board of trustees: The leading national youth agriculture-education program. Glickman favored the expansion of 4-H urban programs
- Meridian Institute: Glickman co-chairs an initiative of eight foundations, administered by the Meridian Institute, to look at long term implications of food and agricultural policy.
- Institute of Medicine: Glickman chairs an initiative at the Institute of Medicine on "accelerating progress on childhood obesity."
- World Food Program USA: vice-chair
- Chicago Council on Global Affairs: co-chair of its global agricultural development initiative
- Author of "Farm Futures," in Foreign Affairs (May/June 2009)

=== Issue One – Council for Responsible Social Media ===
In October 2022, Glickman joined the Council for Responsible Social Media project launched by Issue One to address the negative mental, civic, and public health impacts of social media in the United States co-chaired by former House Democratic Caucus Leader Dick Gephardt and former Massachusetts Lieutenant Governor Kerry Healey.

=== Other roles ===
- Communities In Schools, a federation of independent 501(c)(3) organizations in 27 states and the District of Columbia that work to address the "dropout epidemic"—one of the largest dropout-prevention organizations in the U.S., and one of the largest promoters of community-based, integrated student-support services. CIS identifies and mobilizes existing community resources, and fosters cooperative partnerships, such as: mentoring, tutoring, health care, summer and after-school programs, family counseling, and service learning.
- William Davidson Institute at the University of Michigan, a not-for-profit, independent, research and educational institute dedicated to creating, aggregating, and disseminating intellectual capital on business and policy issues in emerging markets. It provides a forum for business leaders and public policy makers to discuss issues affecting the environment in which these companies operate.
- Advisory Board member for The Michigan in Washington Program at the University of Michigan. The MIW program offers an opportunity each year for 45–50 undergraduates from any major to spend a semester (Fall or Winter) in Washington D.C. Students combine coursework with an internship that reflects their particular area of interest (such as American politics, international studies, history, the arts, public health, economics, the media, the environment, science and technology). The semester in Washington is rigorous. Students work during the day, attend classes in the evenings, and explore the city on weekends.

== Motion picture industry ==
In 2004, the Motion Picture Association of America (MPAA) announced that Glickman would replace Jack Valenti as its chief lobbyist. Glickman was chairman and CEO of the MPAA from 2004 to 2012.

When Glickman was named to the MPAA post, his son Jonathan Glickman was president of Spyglass Entertainment Spyglass Media Group and produced such films as While You Were Sleeping and Rush Hour.

A hallmark of Glickman's MPAA tenure was his "war on movie piracy", or the illegal copying and distribution of motion pictures.

In an MPAA press release, May 31, 2006, entitled "Swedish Authorities Sink Pirate Bay", Dan Glickman stated

The actions today taken in Sweden serve as a reminder to pirates all over the world that there are no safe harbours for Internet copyright thieves

In the 2007 documentary Good Copy Bad Copy, Glickman was interviewed in connection with the 2006 raid on The Pirate Bay by the Swedish police, conceding that piracy will never be stopped, but stating that they will try to make it as difficult and tedious as possible.

On January 22, 2010, Glickman announced he would step down as head of the MPAA on April 1, 2010.

Glickman remains, however, a member of the Academy of Motion Picture Arts and Sciences, which dispenses the Motion Picture Academy Awards (Oscars), and the American Film Institute.

== See also ==
- List of Jewish members of the United States Congress
- List of Jewish United States Cabinet members

U.S. House of Representatives
Preceded by Garner E. Shriver	Member of the U.S. House of Representatives from Kansas's 4th congressional district 1977–1995	Succeeded by Todd Tiahrt
Preceded by Dave McCurdy	Chair of the House Intelligence Committee; 1993–1995	Succeeded by Larry Combest
Political offices
Preceded by Mike Espy	United States Secretary of Agriculture; 1995–2001	Succeeded by Ann Veneman
Non-profit organization positions
Preceded by Jack Valenti	Chairman and Chief Executive Officer of the Motion Picture Association of America; 2004–2010	Succeeded by Chris Dodd
U.S. order of precedence (ceremonial)
Preceded by Robert Rubin as Former U.S. Cabinet Member	Order of precedence of the United States as Former U.S. Cabinet Member	Succeeded by Mickey Kantor as Former U.S. Cabinet Member
