= James Moseley =

James Moseley may refer to:

- James W. Moseley, American observer, author, and commentator on the subject of unidentified flying objects (UFOs)
- James Moseley (politician), member of the South Australian House of Assembly
- Jim Moseley (American politician), deputy secretary of agriculture
