= Krysta Harden =

American government official

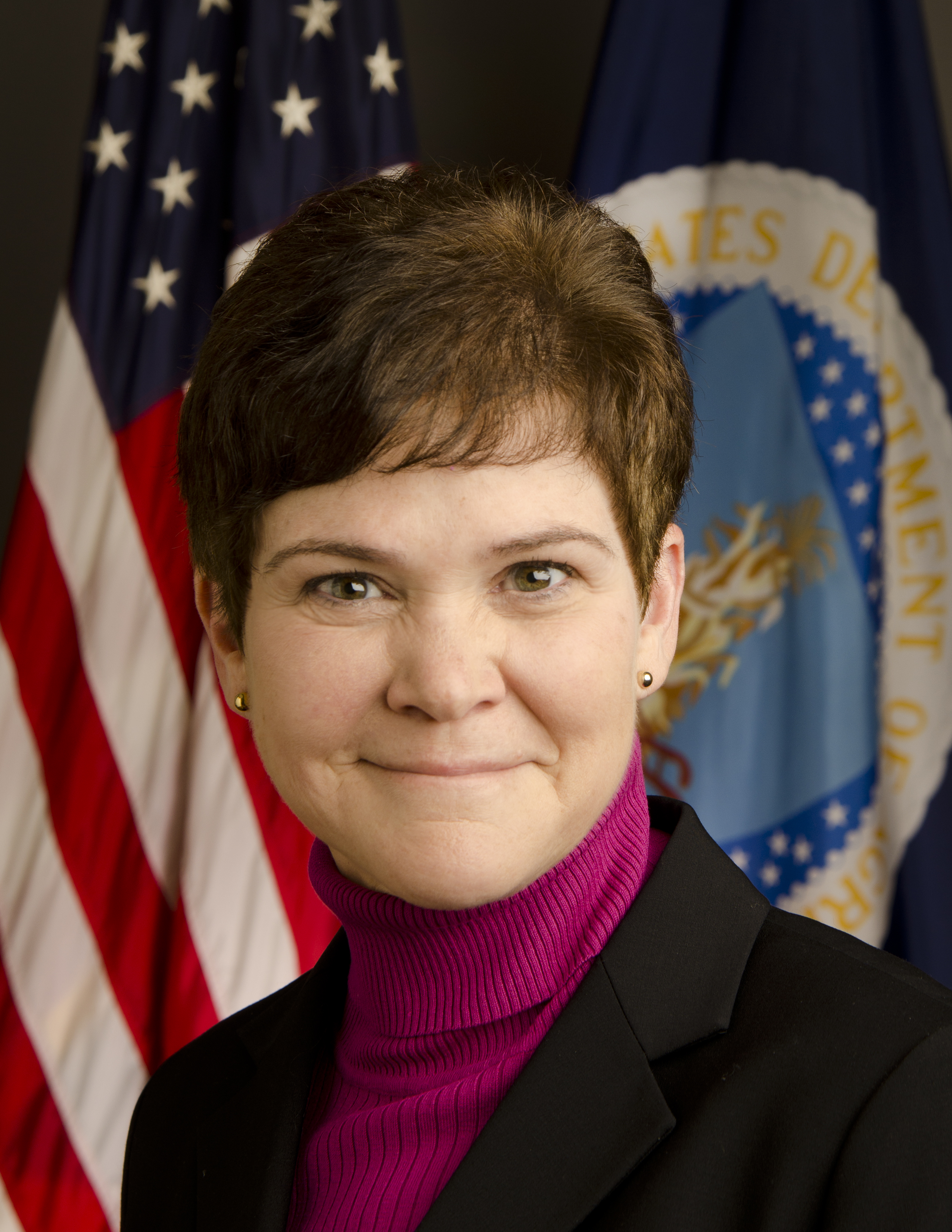
- Official portrait, 2013

12th United States Deputy Secretary of Agriculture
- In office July 23, 2013 – February 29, 2016
- President: Barack Obama
- Preceded by: Kathleen Merrigan
- Succeeded by: Stephen Censky

Chief of Staff to the Secretary of Agriculture
- In office January 2011 – July 2013
- President: Barack Obama
- Preceded by: John Norris
- Succeeded by: Brian Baenig

Personal details
- Born: Camilla, Georgia, U.S.
- Spouse: Charles F. Hatcher
- Education: University of Georgia

Krysta Harden is an American government official who served as United States Deputy Secretary of Agriculture from 2013 to 2016.

== Early life and education ==
Harden was born and raised in Camilla, Georgia. She holds a bachelor's degree from the University of Georgia.

== Career ==
Harden began her career at the United States Department of Agriculture in 2009, serving as Assistant Secretary for Congressional Relations until 2011. Harden served as Chief of Staff for Secretary of Agriculture Tom Vilsack from 2011 to 2013.

Harden was appointed United States Deputy Secretary of Agriculture by President Barack Obama in 2013. She resigned as Deputy Secretary in February 2016 and later assumed the position of Vice President of Public Policy and Chief Sustainability Officer at DuPont, a chemical conglomerate.

== Personal life ==
Harden was married to politician Charles F. Hatcher until his death in September 2026.
