= Jewel H. Bronaugh =

American government official

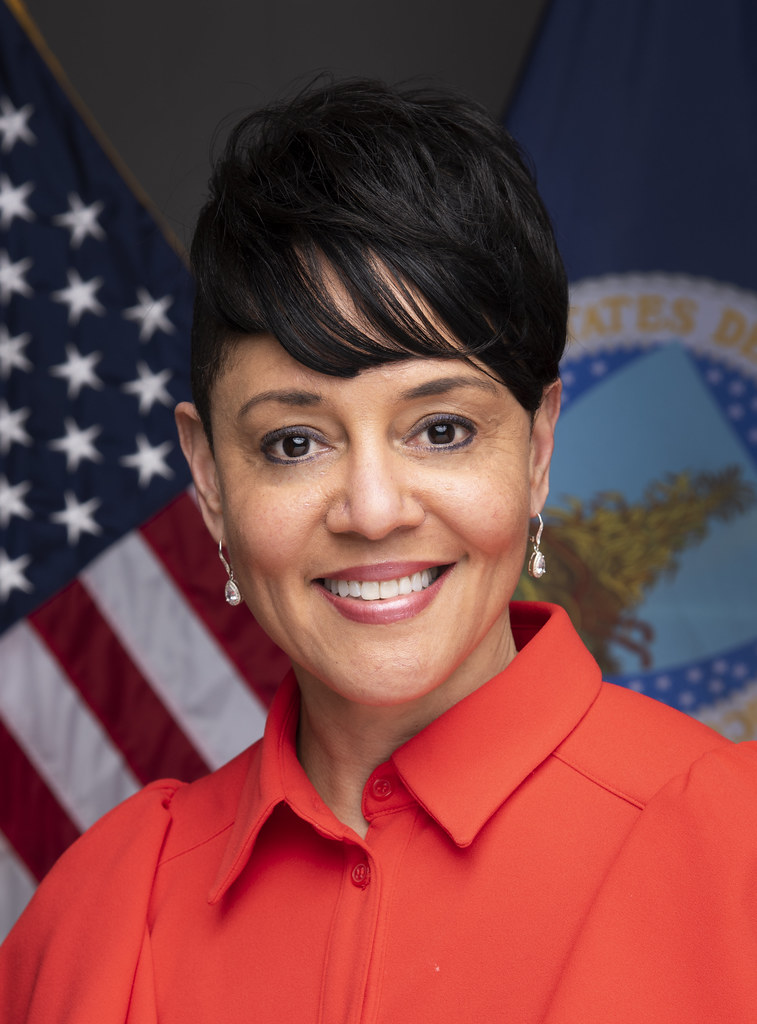

14th United States Deputy Secretary of Agriculture
- In office May 17, 2021 – March 3, 2023
- President: Joe Biden
- Preceded by: Stephen Censky
- Succeeded by: Xochitl Torres Small

16th Commissioner of the Virginia Department of Agriculture and Consumer Services
- In office April 2018 – May 2021
- Governor: Ralph Northam
- Succeeded by: Brad Copenhaver

Personal details
- Born: Petersburg, Virginia, U.S.
- Education: James Madison University (BS); Virginia Tech (MEd, EdD)

Jewel Hairston Bronaugh is an American government official who served as the 14th Deputy Secretary of Agriculture. She previously served as the 16th commissioner of the Virginia Department of Agriculture and Consumer Services from 2018 to 2021. Bronaugh is the first African-American to be Deputy Secretary of Agriculture.

== Early life and education ==
Bronaugh, a native of Petersburg, Virginia, earned a bachelor's degree in education at James Madison University. She completed a master's degree in education and doctorate in career and technical education from Virginia Tech.

== Career ==
In 2001, Bronaugh joined the faculty at Virginia State University (VSU). For five years, Bronaugh served as the dean of the VSU College of Agriculture before becoming executive director of the VSU Center for Agricultural Research, Engagement and Outreach (CAREO). In 2018, she was appointed by Virginia Governor Ralph Northam as the 16th Commissioner of the Virginia Department of Agriculture and Consumer Services. In January 2021, then-President-elect Joe Biden nominated her as the United States Deputy Secretary of Agriculture. She was confirmed by voice vote in the Senate on May 13, 2021 and sworn in on May 17, 2021.

On January 26, 2023, Secretary Tom Vilsack announced that Bronaugh was to resign as deputy secretary.

Political offices
Preceded by Stephen Censky	United States Deputy Secretary of Agriculture; 2021–2023	Succeeded by Xochitl Torres Small
