= Peter C. Myers =

American politician (1931–2012)

Member of the Missouri House of Representatives from the 160th district
- In office January 6, 1999 – January 3, 2007
- Preceded by: Joe Heckemeyer
- Succeeded by: Ellen Brandom

5th United States Deputy Secretary of Agriculture
- In office June 4, 1986 – 1989
- President: Ronald Reagan
- Preceded by: John R. Norton III
- Succeeded by: Jack Parnell

Personal details
- Born: January 4, 1931 Racine, Wisconsin
- Died: November 26, 2012 (aged 81) Sikeston, Missouri
- Party: Republican
- Education: University of Wisconsin–Madison

Peter C. Myers, Sr. (January 4, 1931 – November 26, 2012) was a Missouri politician who served as Deputy Secretary of Agriculture from 1986 to 1989 during the administration of Ronald Reagan. He also served in the Missouri House of Representatives for the 160th district from 1999 to 2007.

== Background ==
Born in Racine, Wisconsin, Myers graduated from William Horlick High School in Racine. Myers then graduated from University of Wisconsin–Madison with a bachelor's degree in agriculture. He then served in the United States Army. Myers died in Sikeston, Missouri.
