= John R. Norton III =

American politician (1929–2016)

4th United States Deputy Secretary of Agriculture
- In office 1985–1986
- President: Ronald Reagan
- Preceded by: Richard Lyng
- Succeeded by: Peter C. Myers

Personal details
- Born: April 10, 1929 Phoenix, Arizona, U.S.
- Died: April 17, 2016 (aged 87) Modesto, California, U.S.
- Party: Republican
- Spouse: Doris Schaefer
- Education: University of Arizona

John R. Norton III (April 10, 1929 – April 17, 2016) was an American farmer and politician who served as United States deputy secretary of agriculture in the Reagan administration.

== Early life and career ==
Norton was born and raised in Phoenix, Arizona. He attended Stanford University for one year and graduated in 1950 from the University of Arizona with a degree in agriculture. Norton served as a First lieutenant in the United States Air Force from 1953 to 1955.

After serving in the military, Norton founded the J.R. Norton Company, which operated cattle ranches and farms in California and Arizona. During this period, Norton served on the boards of the Western Growers Association and United Fresh Fruit and Vegetable Association.

After the 1980 United States presidential election, Norton worked on the transition team of President-elect of the United States Ronald Reagan.

In 1985, Norton was appointed by President Reagan to serve as deputy secretary of the United States Department of Agriculture. He was responsible for the Trust provision reforms to the Perishable Agricultural Commodities Act.

Norton later served on the boards of the Goldwater Institute, Hoover Institution, Smithsonian Institution, and Phoenix Art Museum.

== Philanthropy ==
The Norton family endowed the Norton Gallery at the Phoenix Art Museum and the John and Doris Norton Healing Garden at Saint Joseph's Hospital in Phoenix. Norton endowed a Chair at the University of Phoenix in the School for Fathers, Parenting and Families with the John Norton Endowed Chair for Prostate Cancer Research. He also established the Norton Scholarship Endowment Fund at Creighton University School of Medicine.

In 2014, Norton's gift to the St. Joseph's Foundation established the John and Doris Norton Cardiothoracic and Transplantation Institute. The Norton family also established the Norton Foundation, a 501(c)3 nonprofit organization.
