= John R. Block =

American politician (born 1935)

John Block
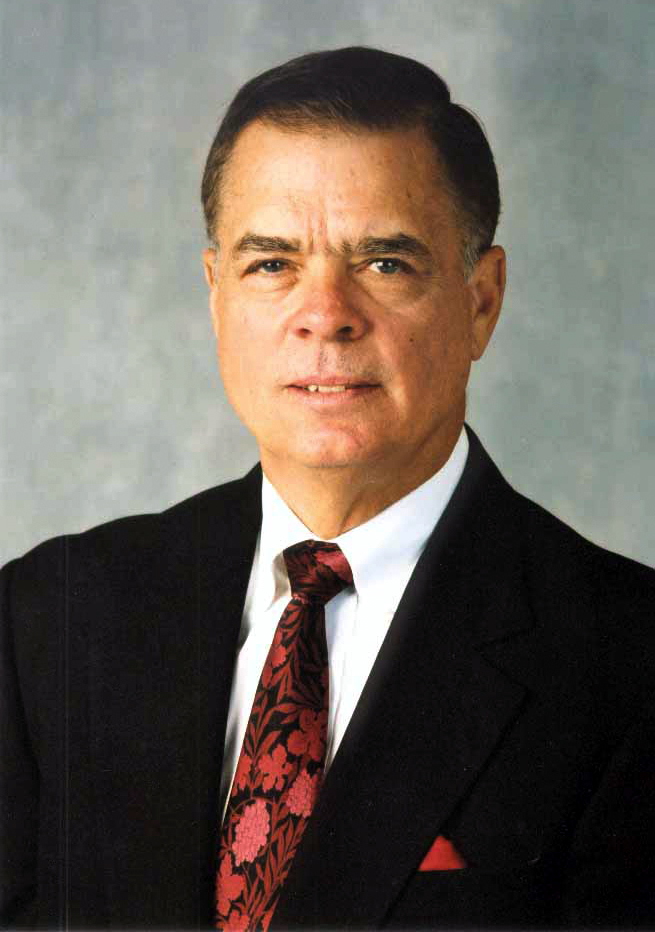

21st United States Secretary of Agriculture
- In office January 23, 1981 – February 14, 1986
- President: Ronald Reagan
- Preceded by: Robert Bergland
- Succeeded by: Richard Lyng

Illinois Director of Agriculture
- In office February 3, 1977 – January 22, 1981
- Governor: James R. Thompson
- Preceded by: Pud Williams
- Succeeded by: Larry Werries

Personal details
- Born: John Rusling Block; February 15, 1935 (age 91) Galesburg, Illinois, U.S.
- Party: Republican
- Spouse: Sue Rathje
- Children: 3
- Education: United States Military Academy (BS)

Military service
- Branch/service: United States Army
- Unit: 101st Airborne

John Rusling Block (born February 15, 1935) is an American politician and lobbyist who served as United States Secretary of Agriculture during the Ronald Reagan administration from 1981 to 1986. He also served as Illinois Director of Agriculture from 1977 to 1981.

== Early life ==
Block was born in Galesburg, Illinois, on February 15, 1935. Of German descent, Block was the son of Julius Judd Block and Madeline (née Maddy) Block. He came from a strongly rural background where the home had no electricity. He graduated from West Point in 1957 and served in 101st Airborne. After that, he became successful in agribusiness.

== Government services ==
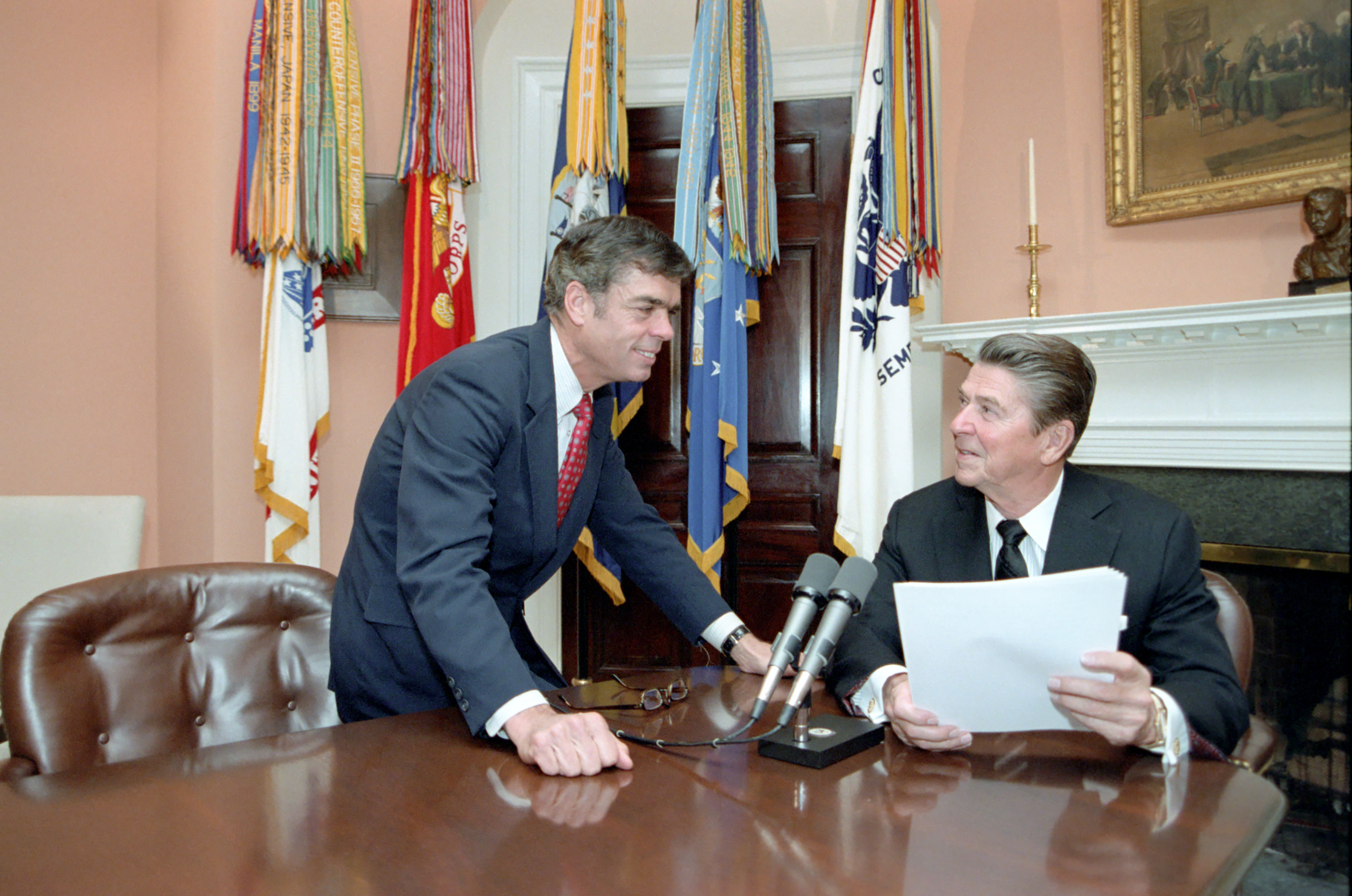
Block and President Ronald Reagan in 1982

Block was a Republican whose agriculture successes formed the basis for his position as the Illinois Director of Agriculture. This led to him becoming the secretary of agriculture in President Ronald Reagan's administration. He was involved in the 1985 Farm Bill Act.

Block was a Secretary of Agriculture, when more farmers lost their farms than at any time since the Great Depression of the 1930s. During his term as Secretary, a Federal court judge ruled in a due process decision, Coleman vs. Block, 663 FSupp 1315, 1332 (D.N.D. 1987), that the U.S. Department of Agriculture ("USDA") and Farmers Home Administration ("FmHA") were not giving farmers enough notice of alternative debt restructuring options. The Court ordered the USDA and FmHA to amend the forms issued to farmers. The decision eventually led to restructuring and reorganization of many farm debts. During the U.S. government's appeal of the decision, Congress passed the Agricultural Credit Act of 1987, Pub. L. No. 100-233, 101 Stat. 1568 (1988). Title VI of the Act made extensive changes in the statutory provisions which had formed the background for the Coleman litigation, the changes being designed to carry out the intent of the Coleman decisions.

In June 1981, Secretary Block invited agricultural and educational leaders willing to work cooperatively toward the common goal of educating the public about the role of agriculture to a workshop in Washington, DC. The resulting task force recommended that the U.S. Department of Agriculture help coordinate local and state Agriculture in the Classroom efforts. The Declaration of Principle was announced by Secretary of Agriculture John Block with a fanfare on Ag Day, March 21, 1983. The Declaration of Principle spelled out the purpose of the Agriculture in the Classroom program and featured the signatures of all seven living former Secretaries of Agriculture. There are now Agriculture in the Classroom programs in every state and many U.S. Territories. Canada, with assistance from USDA, developed an Agriculture in the Classroom program in every Province as well as a national organization. Countries around the world are interested in Agriculture in the Classroom because they have experienced the same needs in agricultural education.

== Post-government career ==
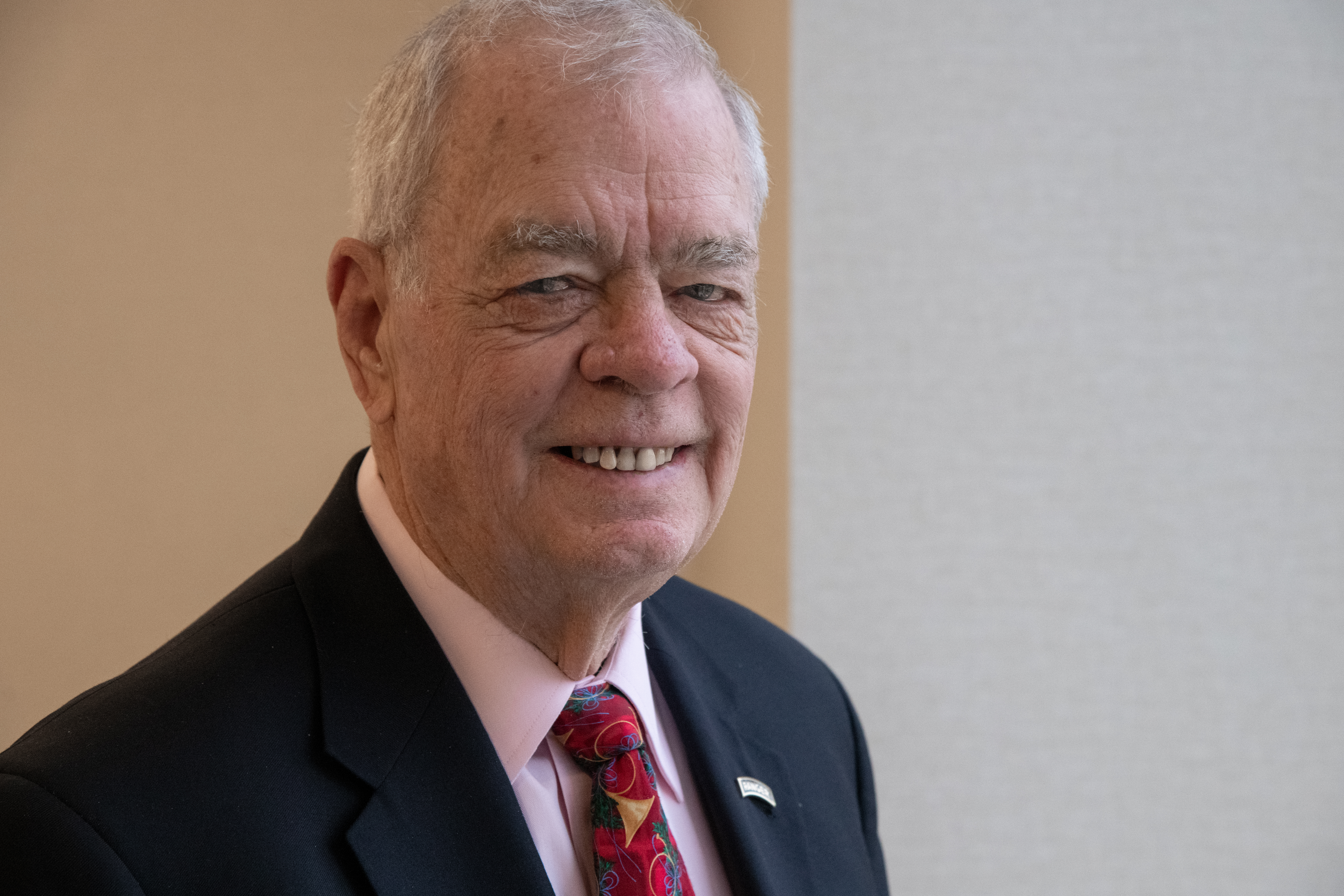
Block in 2018

Since then he has been an executive at John Deere and is President of Food Distributors International. In 1992, he won the Horatio Alger Award. He has been the active in global food programs as well.

In 2004, he joined the Board of Directors of "Digital Angel", which is more of an Internet company. He has also served on the Board of Directors of Friends of the World Food Program (currently known as World Food Program USA), a non-profit dedicated to supporting the UN World Food Program and its efforts to end global hunger. He is a Senior Policy Adviser at Olsson Frank Weeda Terman Bode Matz, a Washington law and lobbying firm that specializes in representing interests before the USDA and related federal agencies. Since 2008, he has served on the Board of Directors for Aemetis.

== Private life ==
He married Suzanne Rathje "Sue" Block, a cousin of famed Chicago banker Frank C. Rathje. He and Suzanne had one son and two daughters: Hans, Cynthia and Christine. He was a very large farmer outside of Knoxville, Illinois and his children attended public school in Knoxville, Illinois. He has a daughter, Savannah, with his second wife and they live in Dunn Loring, Virginia.

Political offices
Preceded by Robert Bergland	United States Secretary of Agriculture; 1981–1986	Succeeded by Richard Lyng
U.S. order of precedence (ceremonial)
Preceded by Ray Marshall as Former U.S. Cabinet Member	Order of precedence of the United States as Former U.S. Cabinet Member	Succeeded by Donald P. Hodel as Former U.S. Cabinet Member
