= Kathleen Merrigan =

American politician

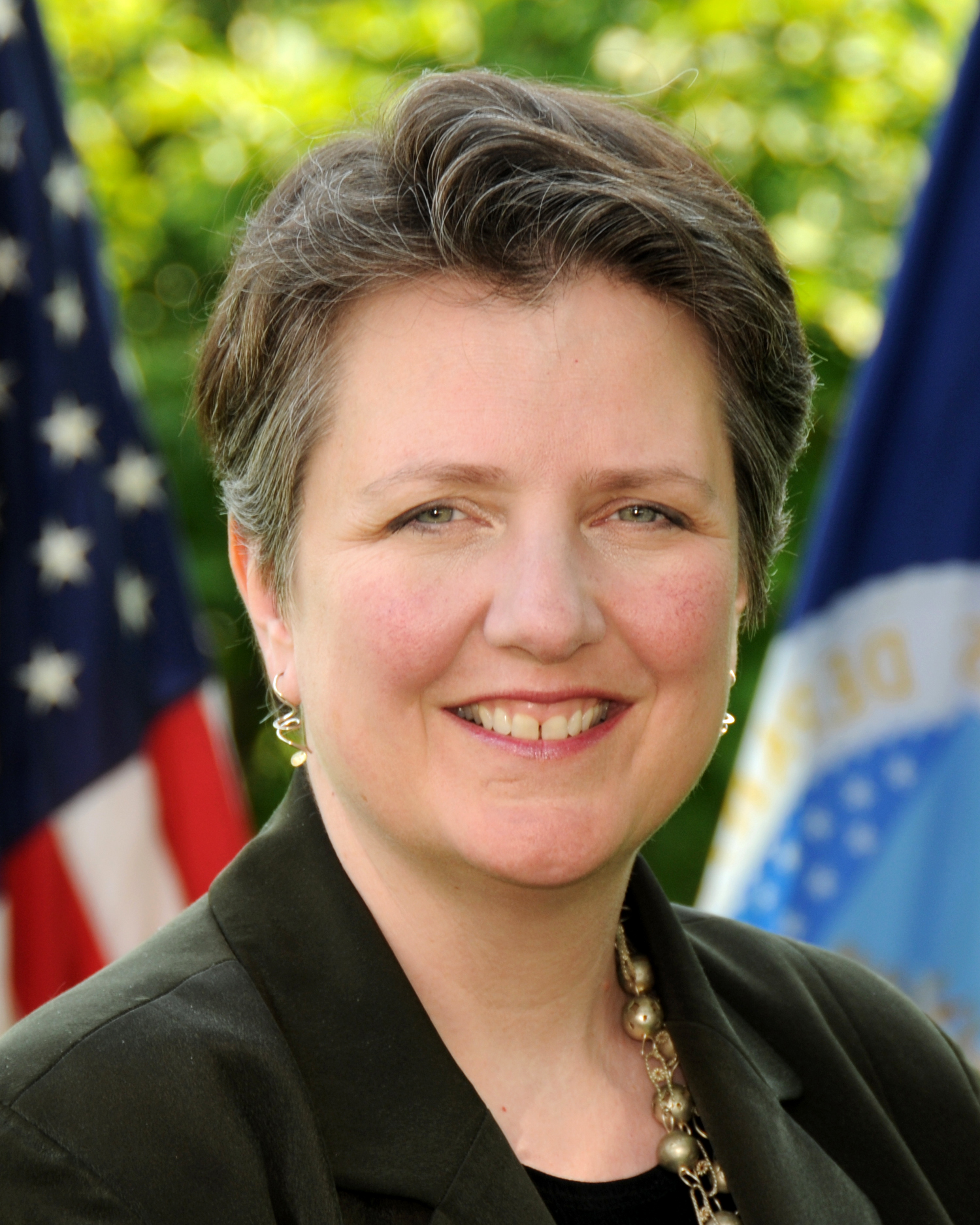

11th United States Deputy Secretary of Agriculture
- In office April 8, 2009 – March 14, 2013
- President: Barack Obama
- Preceded by: Chuck Conner
- Succeeded by: Krysta Harden

Personal details
- Born: October 6, 1959 (age 67) Pittsfield, Massachusetts, U.S.
- Party: Democratic
- Education: Williams College (BA); University of Texas at Austin (MPA); Massachusetts Institute of Technology (PhD)

Kathleen Ann Merrigan (born October 6, 1959) is an American politician who served as the United States deputy secretary of agriculture from April 8, 2009, until her resignation from this position on March 14, 2013. She was the first woman to chair the Ministerial Conference of the Food and Agriculture Organization (FAO) of the United Nations in 2011. She was the former Executive Director of the Sustainability Collaborative at the George Washington University. At GW she also led the GW Food Institute and was a professor of public policy. She was named one of the "100 most influential people in the world" by Time magazine in 2010.

== Career ==
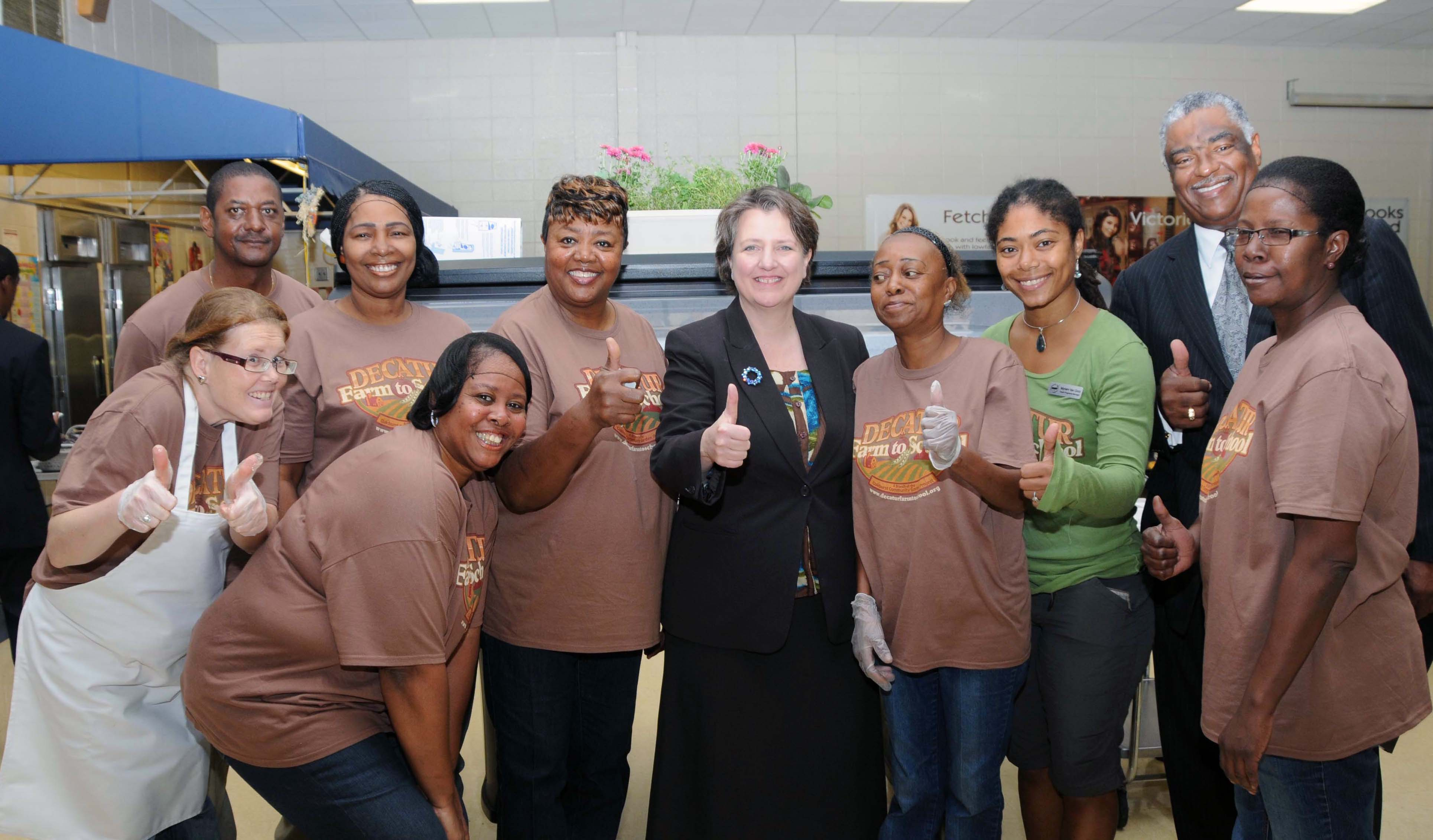
Merrigan posing with cafeteria nutrition staff while visiting Carl G. Renfroe Middle School in Decatur, Georgia, in 2011

She worked at Tufts University as Director of the Agriculture, Food and Environment Program at the Gerald J. and Dorothy R. Friedman School of Nutrition Science and Policy.

She assisted in writing the 1990 Organic Foods Production Act while a professional staff member of the Senate Committee on Agriculture, Nutrition and Forestry. Senator Patrick Leahy, who chaired the committee, introduced the Act and ensured it became law as part of the Food, Agriculture, Conservation and Trade Act of 1990. Senator Leahy said of Ms. Merrigan, "[her] tireless efforts and patience led to comprehensive legislation that creates a first-ever national organic certification program and revamps important agricultural research programs."

In 1999, she began her career at the USDA by heading the Agricultural Marketing Service. At the USDA Merrigan created, led, and managed the "Know Your Farmer, Know Your Food" initiative. This initiative strengthened USDA programs in order to support local food systems around the country. Merrigan helped develop USDA's organic labeling rules while head of the Agricultural Marketing Service from 1999 to 2001.

== Education ==
She has a PhD in environmental planning from Massachusetts Institute of Technology, a Master of Public Affairs from the University of Texas, and a B.A. from Williams College.

== Boards and committees ==
Merrigan serves on a number of boards and committees including: AGree, the Harvard Pilgrim Healthy Food Fund Advisory Committee, Board Director for the Stone Barns Center for Food and Agriculture and FoodCorps, Senior Advisor at the Kendall Foundation, the Council of Environmental Deans and Directors of the National Council for Science and the Environment and the United Nations Environment Programme led initiative TEEB for Agriculture & Food.

Political offices
Preceded by Chuck Conner	United States Deputy Secretary of Agriculture; 2009–2013	Succeeded by Krysta Harden
