= Charles Hatcher (politician) =

American politician (1939–2026)

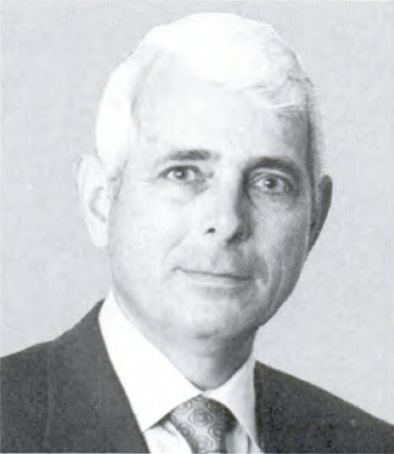

Member of the U.S. House of Representatives from Georgia's 2nd district
- In office January 3, 1981 – January 3, 1993
- Preceded by: Dawson Mathis
- Succeeded by: Sanford Bishop

Member of the Georgia House of Representatives
- In office January 8, 1973 – January 1981
- Preceded by: Haskew Brantley
- Succeeded by: Thomas Chambless
- Constituency: 114th district (1973–1975); 131st district (1975–1980)

Personal details
- Born: Charles Floyd Hatcher; July 1, 1939 Doerun, Georgia, U.S.
- Died: September 1, 2026 (aged 87) Alexandria, Virginia, U.S.
- Party: Democratic
- Spouse: Krysta Harden
- Education: Georgia Southern University (BS); University of Georgia (JD)

Military service
- Branch: United States Air Force
- Service years: 1958–1962
- Rank: Airman (second class)

Charles Floyd Hatcher (July 1, 1939 – September 1, 2026) was an American politician and lawyer from the state of Georgia. He served in Congress as a Democrat.

== Life and career ==
Charles Floyd Hatcher was born in Doerun, Georgia on July 1, 1939. He served in the United States Air Force from 1958 to 1962 reaching the rank of Airman Second Class. After his military service, he attended Georgia Southern College in Statesboro in 1965 and then entered the University of Georgia School of Law in Athens. Hatcher graduated with a Juris Doctor degree in 1969, became a member of the state bar, and started practicing law in Albany, Georgia.

He served in the Georgia House of Representatives from 1973 to 1980. He was elected to six consecutive terms in the U.S. House of Representatives beginning with the election of 1980. Hatcher ran an unsuccessful bid for re-election in 1992, losing the Democratic primary to Sanford Bishop.

Hatcher was married to former United States Deputy Secretary of Agriculture Krysta Harden. He died on September 1, 2026, at the age of 87.

== Sources ==
- United States Congress. "Charles Hatcher (id: H000340)". Biographical Directory of the United States Congress. Retrieved on March 20, 2010
- Appearances on C-SPAN

U.S. House of Representatives
Preceded by Dawson Mathis	Member of the U.S. House of Representatives from Georgia's 2nd congressional district 1981–1993	Succeeded by Sanford Bishop
