= Jim Williams (politician) =

American politician

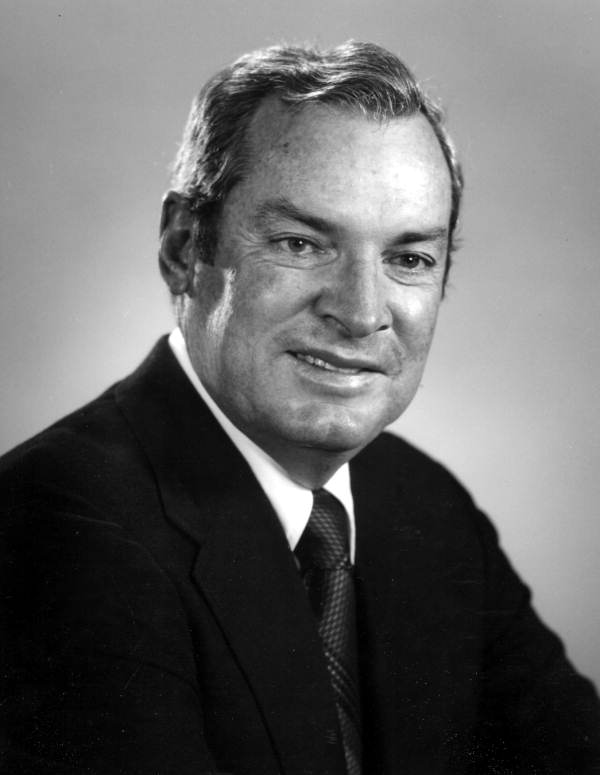

Member of the Florida Senate from the 6th district 13th (1968–1972)
- In office November 5, 1968 – November 4, 1974
- Preceded by: L. K. Edwards Jr.
- Succeeded by: Buddy MacKay

11th Lieutenant Governor of Florida
- In office January 7, 1975 – January 2, 1979
- Governor: Reubin Askew
- Preceded by: Thomas Burton Adams Jr.
- Succeeded by: Wayne Mixson

2nd United States Deputy Secretary of Agriculture
- In office 1979 – January 20, 1981
- President: Jimmy Carter
- Preceded by: John Coyle White
- Succeeded by: Richard Edmund Lyng

Personal details
- Born: James Hunter Williams; June 17, 1926 Ocala, Florida
- Died: December 16, 2016 (aged 90) Ocala, Florida
- Party: Democratic
- Spouse: Louise Oxner Williams

James Hunter Williams (June 17, 1926 – December 16, 2016) was an American politician and member of the Democratic Party. Williams is best known for serving as the 11th Lieutenant Governor of Florida from 1975 to 1979, and as the United States Deputy Secretary of Agriculture from 1979 to 1981.

Prior to his selection as Governor Reubin Askew's running mate during Askew's 1974 reelection campaign, Williams served for six years in the Florida Senate, representing parts of north-central Florida including his home county of Marion. In the Askew administration, Williams also served as Secretary of the Department of Administration and chairman of the state Bicentennial Commission. Williams ran for governor in 1978, but lost the Democratic nomination to Bob Graham. He was succeeded as lieutenant governor by fellow Democrat Wayne Mixson, Graham's running mate.

Following his tenure in state government, Williams served as the Deputy Secretary of the U.S. Department of Agriculture in the Jimmy Carter administration. After Carter's defeat for reelection in 1980, Williams served as a founding director of the SunTrust Bank Holding Company.

Williams died on December 16, 2016. He ran a real estate agency in Ocala, Florida with other employers and members of his family. Jim Williams and his family have also given a vast amount of protected land to Marion County, and own and maintain some orange groves. He served on the governing board of the agency that protects Lake Weir, an important aspect of his home city. The lake's tributary, the Ocklawaha River, would have been damaged if plans had continued to divert its water.

== Education ==
Jim Williams received his bachelor's degree in political science from the University of Florida.

Party political offices
Preceded by Thomas Burton Adams Jr.	Democratic nominee for Lieutenant Governor of Florida; 1974	Succeeded by Wayne Mixson
Political offices
Preceded by Thomas Burton Adams, Jr.	Lieutenant Governor of Florida; 1975–1979	Succeeded by Wayne Mixson
