= United States Deputy Secretary of Agriculture =

Second highest-ranking official in the U.S. Department of Agriculture

- Seal of the department

- Flag of the department

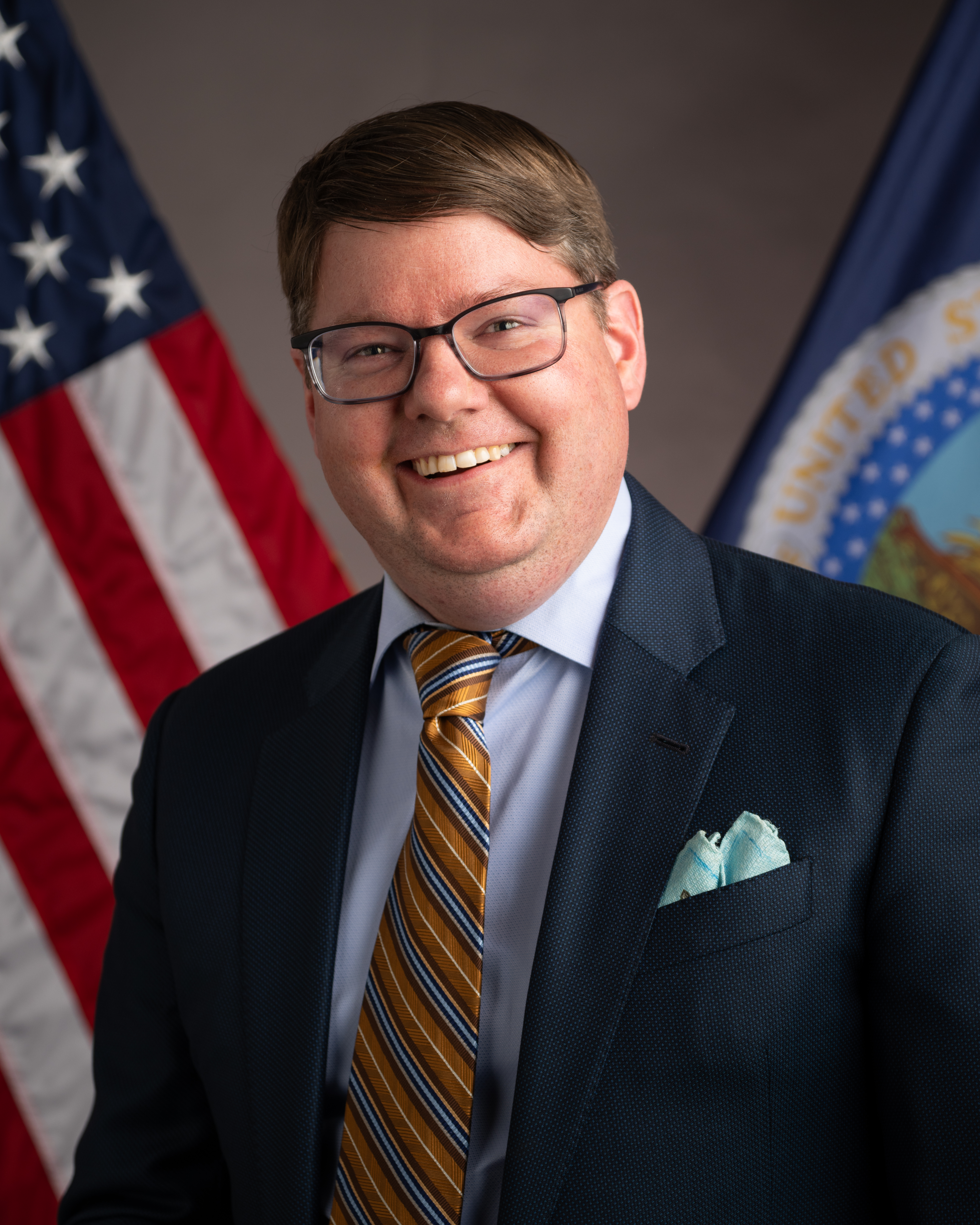
- Incumbent; Stephen Vaden since July 7, 2025
- United States Department of Agriculture
- Style: Deputy Secretary
- Reports to: United States Secretary of Agriculture
- Seat: Washington, D.C.
- Appointer: The president; with Senate advice and consent
- Term length: No fixed term
- Formation: 1977
- First holder: John Coyle White

The United States deputy secretary of agriculture is the second-highest-ranking official in the United States Department of Agriculture, appointed by the President with the advice and consent of the Senate. The deputy secretary becomes acting secretary of agriculture in the event of the Secretary's resignation, death, or other inability to fulfill the duties of the position. The deputy secretary performs whatever duties are prescribed to him or her by the secretary of agriculture. The deputy secretary of agriculture is paid at level II of the Executive Schedule.

The position of deputy secretary of agriculture was originally called the under secretary of agriculture, until the title was changed in 1976. Previous deputy secretaries by recency include Chuck Conner (September 2005–January 2009), Jim Moseley (August 2001 – April 2005), Richard Rominger (May 1993 – January 2001), Ann Veneman (1991–1993), and Jack Parnell (1989–1991). On July 13, 2017, President Donald Trump announced his intent to nominate Stephen Censky, the CEO of the American Soybean Association, as deputy secretary. Censky was confirmed by the U.S. Senate on October 3, 2017, and served until November, 2020. Jewel H. Bronaugh previously served as the senate-confirmed Deputy Secretary from her confirmation on May 13, 2021 until her departure in March 2023. She was the first African-American to serve as deputy secretary. Xochitl Torres Small was nominated by Joe Biden in February 2023, and served as the deputy secretary from July 2023 to January 20, 2025. In December 2020, President Trump announced that he would nominate Stephen Vaden to the role.

Two deputy secretaries have gone on to head the Department of Agriculture, Ann Veneman and Richard Lyng.

== List of deputy secretaries of agriculture ==
denotes Acting Deputy Secretary

Parties

Democratic (7) Republican (8)

No.	Portrait	Name	State of residence	Took office	Left office	President(s)
1		John Coyle White	Texas	1977	December 1977	Jimmy Carter
2		Jim Williams	Florida	1979	January 20, 1981	Jimmy Carter
3		Richard Edmund Lyng	California	1981	January 1985	Ronald Reagan
4		John R. Norton III	Arizona	1985	1986	Ronald Reagan
5		Peter C. Myers	Missouri	June 4, 1986	1989	Ronald Reagan
6		Jack Parnell	Washington	April 20, 1989	May 1, 1991	George H. W. Bush
7		Ann Veneman	California	June 27, 1991	January 20, 1993	George H. W. Bush
8		Richard Rominger	California	May 12, 1993	January 20, 2001	Bill Clinton
9		Jim Moseley	Indiana	July 17, 2001	April 2005	George W. Bush
10		Charles F. Conner	Indiana	May 2, 2005	January 20, 2009	George W. Bush
11		Kathleen Merrigan	Massachusetts	April 8, 2009	March 14, 2013	Barack Obama
12		Krysta Harden	Georgia	July 23, 2013	February 29, 2016	Barack Obama
–		Michael Scuse	Delaware	March 1, 2016	January 20, 2017	Barack Obama
–		Mike Young	Washington D.C.	January 20, 2017	October 10, 2017	Donald Trump
13		Stephen Censky	Missouri	October 11, 2017	November 8, 2020	Donald Trump
14		Jewel H. Bronaugh	Virginia	May 17, 2021	March 3, 2023	Joe Biden
15		Xochitl Torres Small	New Mexico	July 17, 2023	January 20, 2025	Joe Biden
16		Stephen Vaden	Tennessee	July 7, 2025	Incumbent	Donald Trump
