= Richard Lyng =

American politician

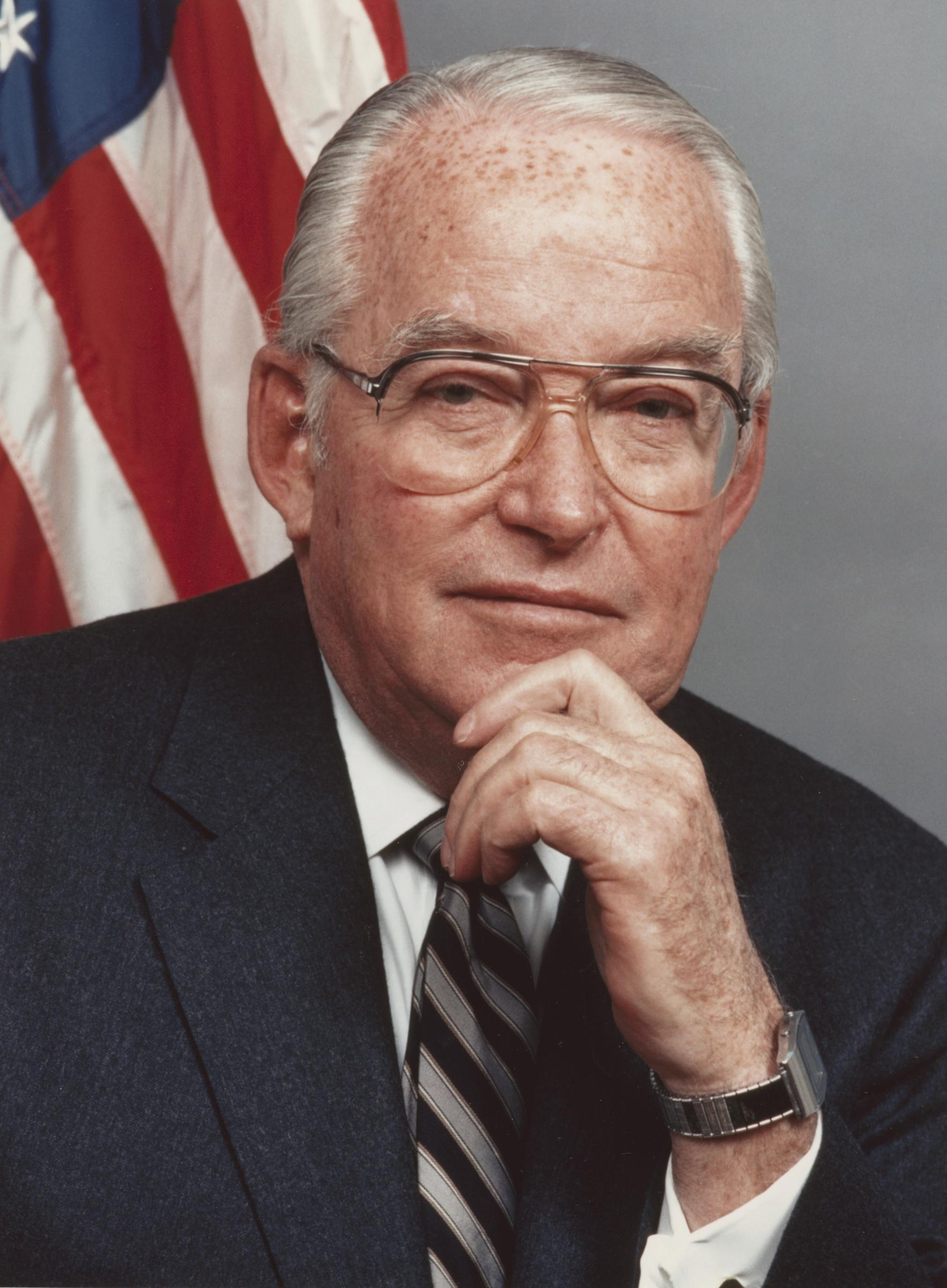

22nd United States Secretary of Agriculture
- In office March 7, 1986 – January 20, 1989
- President: Ronald Reagan
- Preceded by: John Rusling Block
- Succeeded by: Clayton Yeutter

3rd United States Deputy Secretary of Agriculture
- In office 1981 – January 1985
- President: Ronald Reagan
- Preceded by: Jim Williams
- Succeeded by: John R. Norton III

Personal details
- Born: June 29, 1918 San Francisco, California, U.S.
- Died: February 1, 2003 (aged 84) Modesto, California, U.S.
- Party: Republican
- Spouse: Bethyl Lyng
- Children: 2
- Parent(s): Edmund John Lyng; Sara McGrath Lyng
- Education: University of Notre Dame
- Occupation: Government

Military service
- Branch/service: United States Army
- Battles/wars: World War II

Richard Edmund Lyng (June 29, 1918 – February 1, 2003) was a U.S. administrator. A Republican, he served as the U.S. Secretary of Agriculture from 1986 to 1989.

== Early life and career ==
Lyng was born on June 29, 1918, in San Francisco, California. He was the son of Edmund John Lyng, the founder of a California agricultural products company, and his wife, Sara Cecilia (McGrath). He graduated from the University of Notre Dame. He served in the U.S. Army during World War II.

In the mid-1950s, Lyng went into business and eventually became president of the Ed. J. Lyng Co., a seed and bean processing company. In 1973, Lyng became the President of the American Meat Institute, serving until 1979. In 1980, Lyng was appointed to deputy secretary of agriculture, and then secretary of agriculture under President Reagan's cabinet, serving from 1986 to 1989. He was chosen as one of the charter members of the Meat Industry Hall of Fame in 2009.

== Personal life ==
Lyng married Bethyl Ball on June 25, 1944. They had two daughters, Jeannette Lyng Robinson and Marylin Lyng O'Connell. Bethyl Lyng died in 2000.

Lyng died of complications from Parkinson's disease in Modesto, California, on February 1, 2003.

== See also ==
- Lyng v. Northwest Indian Cemetery Protective Ass'n

Political offices
Preceded by John R. Block	U.S. Secretary of Agriculture; Served under: Ronald Reagan; March 7, 1986 – January 20, 1989	Succeeded by Clayton K. Yeutter
