= Stephen Censky =

American businessman

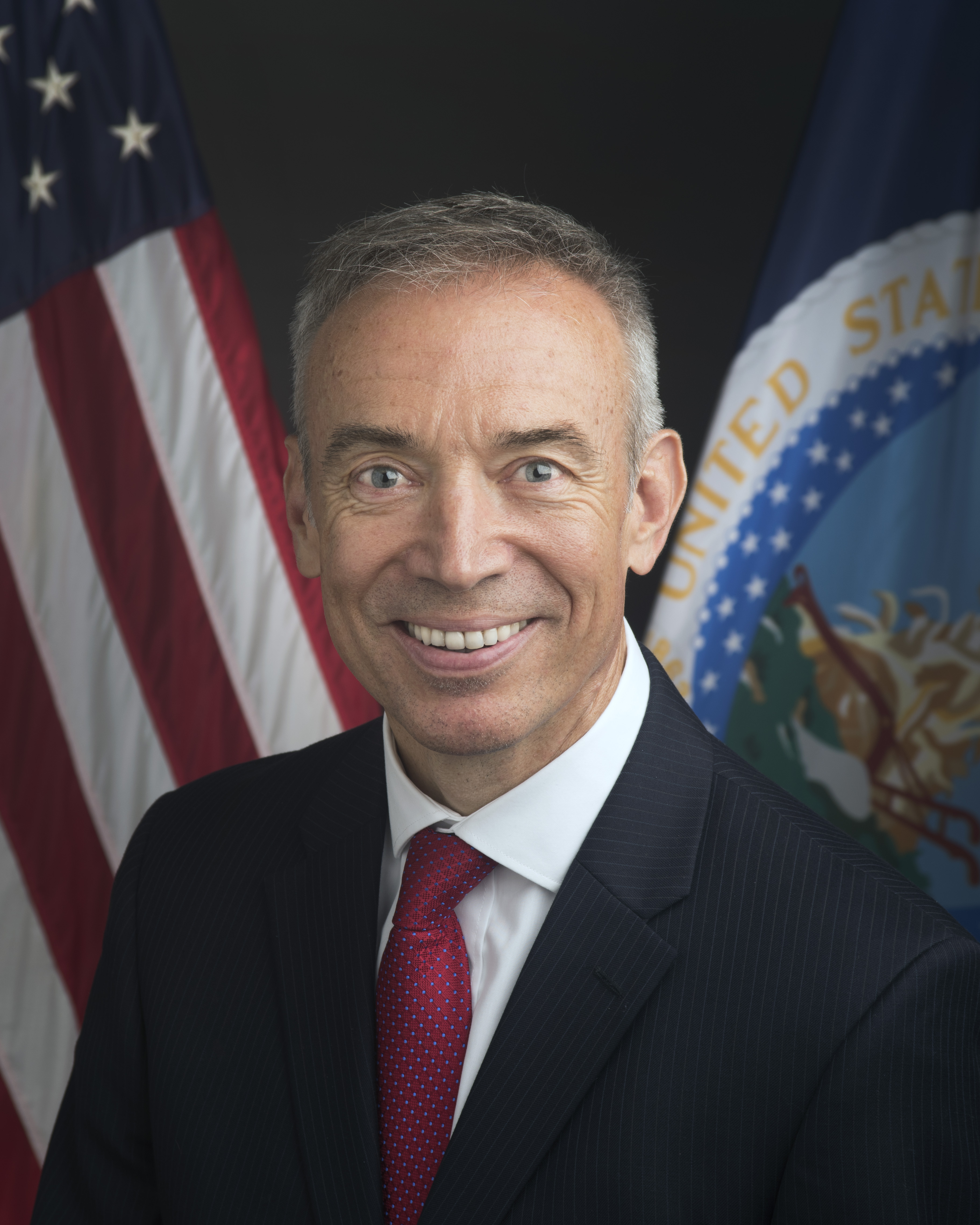
- Official portrait, 2017

13th United States Deputy Secretary of Agriculture
- In office October 11, 2017 – November 8, 2020
- President: Donald Trump
- Preceded by: Krysta Harden
- Succeeded by: Jewel H. Bronaugh

Personal details
- Born: Stephen Lee Censky Jackson, Minnesota, U.S.
- Party: Republican
- Education: South Dakota State University (BS); University of Melbourne

Stephen Lee Censky is an American businessman and former government official. He served as the United States Deputy Secretary of Agriculture from 2017 through 2020. In November 2020, he became the CEO of the American Soybean Association (ASA). He was also CEO of the ASA for 21 years prior to his tenure as U.S. Deputy Secretary of Agriculture.

== Early life and education ==
Censky was raised on a soybean and corn farm near Jackson, Minnesota and received a Bachelor of Science degree in agriculture from South Dakota State University. He won the Truman Scholarship while at South Dakota State University in 1980, the first winner in the school's history. He later went on to earn a postgraduate diploma in agriculture science from the University of Melbourne.

== Career ==
Censky was a legislative assistant to United States Senator James Abdnor before holding several appointments in the United States Department of Agriculture, eventually rising to become Administrator of the Foreign Agricultural Service. He went on to work for the American Soybean Association for the next 23 years, including as their chief executive officer for 21 of those years. In 2017, he was nominated to the office of United States Deputy Secretary of Agriculture. He was confirmed by the U.S. Senate on October 3, 2017, by voice vote and was sworn in on October 10, 2017. He returned to the American Soybean Association, as chief executive officer, starting in November 2020.

== Personal life ==
Censky is married and has two daughters.

Political offices
Preceded by Krysta Harden	United States Deputy Secretary of Agriculture; 2017–2020	Succeeded by Jewel H. Bronaugh
