= Richard Bond (political executive) =

American politician

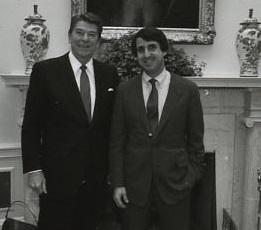
- Bond (right) with Ronald Reagan

Chair of the Republican National Committee
- In office February 1, 1992 – January 29, 1993
- Preceded by: Clay Yeutter
- Succeeded by: Haley Barbour

Personal details
- Born: Richard Norman Bond; 1950 or 1951 (age 74–75)
- Political party: Republican
- Education: Fordham University (BA); Georgetown University (MA)

Richard Norman Bond is a former chairman of the Republican National Committee (RNC).

Bond earned a bachelor's degree in English and Philosophy from Fordham University and a master's degree in Government from Georgetown University.

Bond served in a variety of positions at the Republican National Committee under Presidents Gerald Ford, Ronald Reagan, and George H. W. Bush prior to being elected chairman in 1992. Despite the President's tough defeat that year, the GOP held their ground in the Senate and gained 10 seats in the House of Representatives. The GOP also held their gubernatorial seats and net gained control of seven additional state legislative chambers.

In addition to his credentials at the RNC, Bond has served five presidential campaigns over the past twenty years, including the management of fifty state operations as national political director in Bush's successful 1988 presidential campaign. Government posts include deputy chief of staff to Vice President Bush, congressional press secretary, and member of the board of directors of the Peace Corps.

Bond remains a media spokesman for the Republican Party, commenting on national issues and current political trends, with appearances on network television and radio shows. The author of over forty articles on politics and government, Bond has also lectured at many colleges and universities, and has been quoted in a variety of national news magazines and major newspapers.

Party political offices
Preceded by Clay Yeutter	Chair of the Republican National Committee; 1992–1993	Succeeded by Haley Barbour
