= Ann Veneman =

American attorney (born 1949)

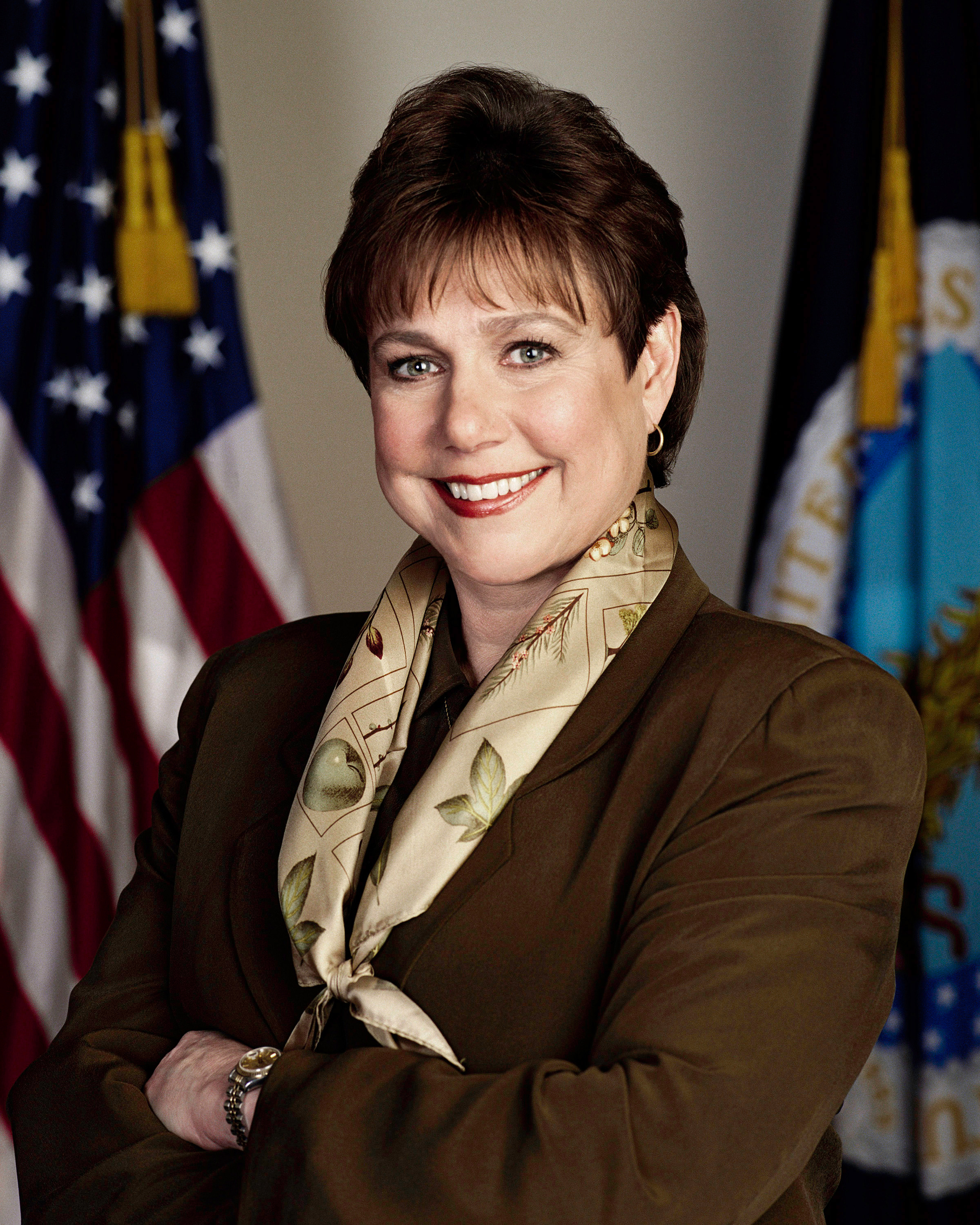
- Official portrait, 2001

5th Executive Director of UNICEF
- In office May 1, 2005 – April 30, 2010
- Secretary General: Kofi Annan; Ban Ki-moon
- Preceded by: Carol Bellamy
- Succeeded by: Anthony Lake

27th United States Secretary of Agriculture
- In office January 20, 2001 – January 20, 2005
- President: George W. Bush
- Preceded by: Dan Glickman
- Succeeded by: Mike Johanns

7th United States Deputy Secretary of Agriculture
- In office June 27, 1991 – January 20, 1993
- President: George H. W. Bush
- Preceded by: Jack Parnell
- Succeeded by: Richard Rominger

Personal details
- Born: Ann Margaret Veneman; June 29, 1949 (age 77) Modesto, California, U.S.
- Party: Republican
- Relatives: John Veneman (father)
- Education: University of California, Davis (BA); University of California, Berkeley (MPP); University of California, Hastings (JD)

Ann Margaret Veneman (born June 29, 1949) is an American attorney who served as the fifth executive director of UNICEF from 2005 to 2010. She previously served as the 27th United States secretary of agriculture from 2001 to 2005. Veneman served for the first term of President George W. Bush, and she left to take the UNICEF position. Appointed by the U.N. Secretary-General Kofi Annan on January 18, 2005, she took over the post on May 1, 2005, serving until 2010. Previously, she also served as secretary of the California Department of Food and Agriculture, serving from 1995 to 1999, as well as United States deputy secretary of agriculture, serving from 1991 to 1993. Veneman was the first woman to serve as Secretary of Agriculture and the second woman to lead UNICEF, following her predecessor, Carol Bellamy.

== Early life and education ==
Veneman was raised on a peach farm in Modesto, California. Her father, John Veneman, was former undersecretary of Health, Education and Welfare and member of the California State Assembly. She earned her bachelor's degree in political science from the University of California, Davis, a Master of Public Policy from the Richard & Rhoda Goldman School of Public Policy at the University of California, Berkeley, and a Juris Doctor degree from the University of California, Hastings College of the Law. She has also been awarded honorary doctoral degrees from California Polytechnic State University, San Luis Obispo (2001); Lincoln University (Missouri) (2003); Delaware State University (2004) and Middlebury College (2006).

== Legal, political and corporate career ==
Veneman began her legal career as a staff attorney with the General Counsel's office of the Bay Area Rapid Transit District in Oakland, California, in 1976. In 1978, she returned to Modesto, where she served as a Deputy Public Defender. In 1980, she joined the Modesto law firm of Damrell, Damrell and Nelson, where she was an associate and later a partner.

Veneman joined the United States Department of Agriculture's Foreign Agricultural Service in 1986, serving as Associate Administrator until 1989. During this time she worked on the Uruguay Round talks for the General Agreement on Tariffs and Trade (GATT). She subsequently served as Deputy Undersecretary of Agriculture for International Affairs and Commodity Programs from 1989 to 1991. From 1991 to 1993, she served as United States Department of Agriculture's Deputy Secretary, the first woman appointed as the Department's second-highest-ranking official. Veneman then left political and administrative office to practice with the law firm and lobby group Patton, Boggs & Blow and also served on several boards of directors and advisory groups.

In 1995, Veneman re-entered government, when she was appointed Secretary of the California Department of Food and Agriculture, the first woman to hold the position. From 1999 to 2001, Veneman was an attorney with Nossaman LLP, where she focused her attention on food, agriculture, environment, technology, and trade related issues. On 20 January 2001 she was unanimously confirmed by the United States Senate and sworn in as Secretary of Agriculture, a position she held until January 20, 2005.

== Personal life ==
A lawyer, Veneman has practiced law in Washington, DC and California, including being a deputy public defender.

In 2002, Veneman was diagnosed with breast cancer and received successful treatment. Veneman is also a second cousin of Star Wars creator George Lucas. In 2015, Veneman signed an amicus brief asking the United States Supreme Court to nationally recognize same-sex marriage.

== Secretary of Agriculture ==
=== BluePrint for Agriculture ===
In 2001 Veneman released a blueprint for agriculture, Food and Agricultural Policy: Taking Stock for the New Century.

=== Protection of agriculture and the food supply ===
Within weeks after taking office, Veneman confronted the outbreak of foot and mouth disease in Europe, prompting stronger sanitary and phytosanitary measures. After the September 11, 2001 attacks, additional protections were implemented. She also oversaw responses to outbreaks of avian influenza and exotic Newcastle disease in poultry, both of which were quickly eradicated. The department confronted various food safety recalls, prompting Veneman to take several actions to strengthen USDA's regulatory oversight and protections.

On December 23, 2003, Veneman announced the discovery of a single cow with Bovine spongiform encephalopathy (BSE), or mad cow disease, in Washington State. This would be the very first incident of mad cow disease in the United States. The cow was determined to be of Canadian origin. After taking initial steps in response, one week later, on December 30, 2003, Veneman announced additional protective measures to be put into place.These included a ban on "downer," or nonambulatory cattle, from the human food supply; additional food-safety measures in the processing of beef and related products; and an acceleration of "the development of the technology architecture" for a national system to track and identify livestock.

=== International trade ===
Veneman was involved in eliminating trade barriers and creating export markets for U.S. farmers.

=== Child nutrition and food programs ===
During Veneman's tenure, the Food Stamp Program and child nutrition program were reauthorized and funding increased. In 2004, Veneman finalized the transition from paper food stamps to electronic debit cards in an effort to reduce fraud and increase availability of these programs to more families in need. Under Veneman, after a comprehensive scientific review, new Dietary Guidelines for Americans were released, which formed the basis for USDA's MyPyramid.

As secretary, Veneman focused on new approaches to combat world hunger. To help meet the international goal of reducing global hunger by half by 2015, she organized and hosted in 2003 the Ministerial Conference on Science and Technology, which brought together ministers from 120 nations to California, to discuss how science and technology can reduce hunger and poverty in the developing world.

=== USDA Management and Programs ===
As part of several actions to implement the President's Management Agenda (PMA), Veneman began USDA's e-Government Initiative, which made an unprecedented array of programs and services available electronically. In addition, USDA for the first time ever received a clean financial audit, a status the department attained three years in a row.

Veneman established USDA's 'Leaders of Tomorrow' initiative to support agriculture education and related mentoring. She increased the number of internships available at USDA, and encouraged young people to seek career opportunities at USDA and across the food and agricultural spectrum.

== UNICEF Executive Director ==
In 2007, Veneman helped launch a partnership with US playwright Eve Ensler in 2007, to bring awareness to sexual abuse and violence against women in the Democratic Republic of the Congo. Veneman has also called for greater efforts to end female genital mutilation. In February 2009, marking the International Day against the practice, Veneman said, "Some 70 million girls and women alive today have been subjected to female genital cutting. While some communities have made real progress in abandoning this dangerous practice, the rights, and even the lives, of too many girls continue to be threatened."

In 2009, Veneman was named to Forbes Magazine's List of The World's 100 Most Powerful Women, ranking #46. Forbes cited Veneman in part because she "played a key role in the joint effort by UNICEF, the World Health Organization, the United Nations Population Fund and the World Bank to help accelerate progress on maternal and newborn health in the 25 countries with the highest rates of infant mortality worldwide."

Veneman was succeeded by Anthony Lake on May 1, 2010.

== Nestlé ==
After her time with UNICEF, Veneman served as an adviser to Nestlé and took a seat on Nestlé's board of directors. Nutrition campaign groups criticized Veneman's involvement with Nestlé because of the company's violation of a global code restricting advertising of breast milk substitutes.

== See also ==
- List of female United States Cabinet members
- List of first women lawyers and judges in California

Political offices
Preceded by Dan Glickman	United States Secretary of Agriculture; 2001–2005	Succeeded by Mike Johanns
Diplomatic posts
Preceded by Carol Bellamy	Executive Director of UNICEF; 2005–2010	Succeeded by Tony Lake
U.S. order of precedence (ceremonial)
Preceded by Lawrence Summers as Former U.S. Cabinet Member	Order of precedence of the United States as Former U.S. Cabinet Member	Succeeded by Donald Evans as Former U.S. Cabinet Member
