= Clayton Yeutter =

American politician

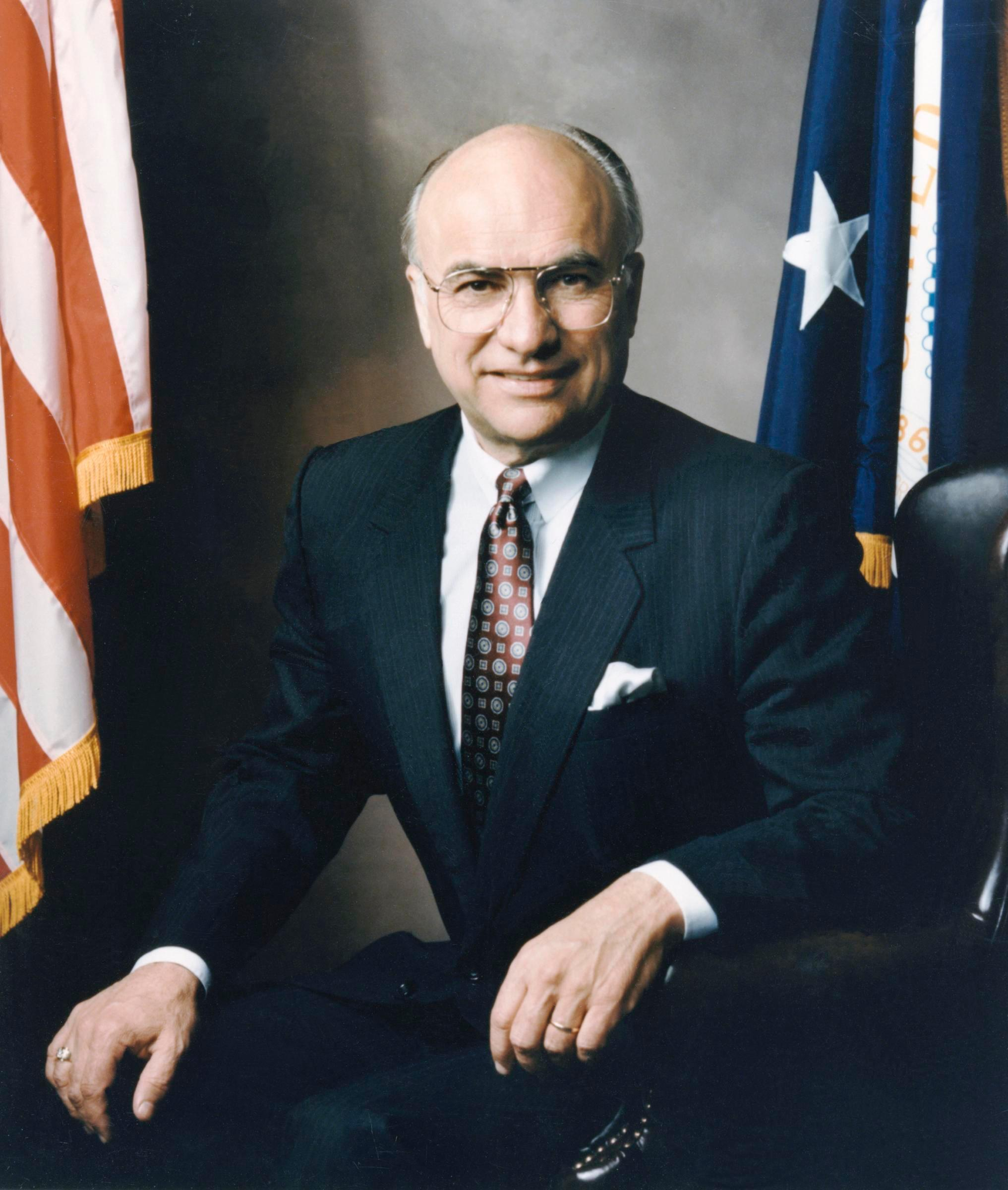

Counselor to the President
- In office February 1, 1992 – January 20, 1993
- President: George H. W. Bush
- Preceded by: Edwin Meese (1985)
- Succeeded by: David Gergen

Chair of the Republican National Committee
- In office January 25, 1991 – February 1, 1992
- Preceded by: Lee Atwater
- Succeeded by: Richard Bond

23rd United States Secretary of Agriculture
- In office February 16, 1989 – March 1, 1991
- President: George H. W. Bush
- Preceded by: Richard Edmund Lyng
- Succeeded by: Edward Rell Madigan

9th United States Trade Representative
- In office July 1, 1985 – January 20, 1989
- President: Ronald Reagan
- Preceded by: Bill Brock
- Succeeded by: Carla Anderson Hills

Personal details
- Born: Clayton Keith Yeutter; December 10, 1930 Eustis, Nebraska, U.S.
- Died: March 4, 2017 (aged 86) Potomac, Maryland, U.S.
- Party: Republican
- Spouses: Jeanne Vierk (m. 1952; died 1993); Cristena Bach (m. 1995)
- Children: 7
- Education: University of Nebraska (BS, JD, MS, PhD); University of Wisconsin, Madison (attended)

Clayton Keith Yeutter, ONZM (/ˈjaɪtər/; December 10, 1930 – March 4, 2017) was an American politician who served as United States Secretary of Agriculture under President George H. W. Bush from 1989 to 1991 before serving as counselor to the president in 1992. He served as United States Trade Representative from 1985 to 1989 and as chairman for the Republican National Committee from 1991 until 1992. Yeutter was employed as a senior advisor at the international law firm Hogan Lovells in Washington, D.C. He additionally founded the Clayton Yeutter Institute of International Trade and Finance at his alma mater, the University of Nebraska–Lincoln. The university subsequently published his biography, Rhymes with Fighter.

Yeutter was born in Eustis, Nebraska. Yeutter was a graduate of the University of Nebraska from which he received a multiple degrees in agricultural economics. Yeutter later served as assistant secretary of agriculture for marketing and consumer services from 1973 to 1974, assistant secretary of agriculture for international affairs and commodity programs from 1974 to 1975, and deputy special representative for trade negotiations from 1975 to 1977.

== Early life and education ==
Yeutter was born in Eustis, Nebraska, on December 10, 1930, during the Nebraska Dust Bowl and the Great Depression. Despite a successful career in government and politics, Yeutter expressed a continued desire to remain close to his upbringing. As Deputy Trade Representative Yeutter stated, "I once wanted to stay in Nebraska and be a successful farmer. There are days when I get a yearning to return."

Yeutter graduated from Eustis High School in 1948. He then attended the University of Nebraska and was a member of FarmHouse Fraternity. In 1952 Yeutter graduated with a B.S. "With High Distinction", the highest scholastic honor given by the University of Nebraska. He also ranked first in the College of Agriculture graduating class and was named the "Outstanding Animal Husbandry Graduate" in the United States.

Upon graduation from the University of Nebraska, which coincided with the Korean War, Yeutter enlisted as a Basic Airman in the United States Air Force. While enlisted he earned credits under the G.I. Bill to attend graduate school. From the completion of his enlistment in 1957 until 1975 Yeutter worked as the operator of a 2,500-acre farming enterprise in central Nebraska. He also continued to serve in the active reserve until 1977.

During an overlapping six-year period beginning in January 1960, Yeutter worked as a faculty member within the Department of Agricultural Economics at his alma mater, the University of Nebraska. While working within the Department of Agricultural Economics Yeutter completed extensive graduate work. He completed one semester of graduate studies in agricultural economics at the University of Wisconsin–Madison in 1960. After entering the University of Nebraska College of Law Yeutter served as an editor of the Nebraska Law Review. In 1963 Yeutter graduated cum laude with a J.D. and ranked first in his graduating class. While Yeutter continued to work as a faculty member he also completed a Ph.D. in agricultural economics by 1966. While completing his J.D. and Ph.D., Yeutter taught agricultural economics and agricultural law part-time. After completing his J.D. Yeutter taught full-time from 1965 to 1966.

== Professional career ==
Yeutter began his professional political career as the chief of staff to the governor of Nebraska in January 1967. During the following two years he managed coordination between the governor's office and the Department of Agriculture and the numerous state educational institutions. Additionally, he was responsible for lobbying Governor Norbert Tiemann's legislative program through the Nebraska legislature. In September 1968 Yeutter left public service to become the Director of the University of Nebraska Mission in Colombia. At the time it was the largest agricultural technical assistance program in the world. The mission involved six Midwestern land-grant universities funded by U.S. AID, the Kellogg Foundation and the Ford Foundation. The participating universities provided agricultural assistance to the National University of Colombia and the Colombian Agricultural Institute, which approximated the United States Department of Agriculture.

After returning from Colombia, Yeutter served as Administrator of Consumer and Marketing Service within the U.S. Department of Agriculture from October 1970 until December 1971. In January 1972 Yeutter was assigned to two positions in the reelection campaign of President Richard Nixon. He served as the nationwide director of agriculture and as one of ten regional directors. Following Nixon's reelection, Yeutter was appointed to Assistant Secretary of Agriculture for Marketing and Consumer Services within the U.S. Department of Agriculture in January 1973. In March 1974 Yeutter was appointed Assistant Secretary of Agriculture for International Affairs and Commodity Programs. As Assistant Secretary, Yeutter was in charge of negotiating an end to a trade war between the United States and the European Economic Community over cheese subsidizes.

In June 1975 Yeutter shifted from the Department of Agriculture to the Executive Office of the President, in which he served as Deputy Special Trade Representative. In this position, Yeutter worked as an ambassador in trade negotiations with foreign countries. In February 1977, shortly after Gerald Ford vacated the presidency, Yeutter exited public service.

In April 1977 Yeutter became a senior partner at the law firm Nelson, Harding, Yeutter & Leonard, which was primarily located in Lincoln, Nebraska. He continued to work at the firm until June 1978.

Yeutter served as president and CEO of the Chicago Mercantile Exchange, the world's second-largest futures exchange at the time, from July 1978 until June 1985. During that period, the trade volume of agricultural, currency, and interest rate futures more than tripled. While serving as president, Yeutter negotiated the use of the Tokyo Stock Exchange index for futures and options trading. He also encouraged European investors to invest in currency futures and options at the Chicago Mercantile Exchange. More than 400 visits to the exchange by members of Congress during Yeutter's tenure provided him with political experience that which would become especially valuable when he worked directly with Congress between 1985 and 1993.

=== United States Trade Representative ===
After working for eight years in the private sector, Yeutter returned to public office in July 1985. After Reagan's nomination, Yeutter was confirmed by the Senate as U.S. Trade Representative on June 28, 1985. He succeeded William E. Brock, who was named Secretary of Labor. While holding the position Yeutter helped pass the 1988 Trade Bill through Congress, completed the Canada–United States Free Trade Agreement, managed the initial negotiations regarding the Uruguay Round of the General Agreement on Tariffs and Trade and used American trade laws to open foreign markets to American goods.

Yeutter was perceived to be an outsider because of his inexperience interacting with Congress to develop legislation and because he was only mildly acquainted with the President. These characteristics contrasted with his 11 predecessors, who possessed greater political credentials and a closer relationship to the President. In fact, Yeutter argued that his independence from Reagan reflected his success in the position.

Along with the Commerce Secretary, Malcolm Baldrige, and Treasury Secretary, James Baker, Yeutter was accredited with the formulation of a comprehensive US trade policy after his first 4 months in office. At this point in time the Reagan administration was faced with mounting pressure from the Congress for protectionist policy that would tackle the mounting international trade deficit. Additionally, Yeutter faced tense trade negotiations with Japan. In June 1985 Yeutter initiated an investigation based on Section 301 of the 1974 Trade Act against Japan for unfair barriers to sale of American electronic products. In October Yeutter took similar action against South Korea based on a complaint filed by the MPAA. The unfair trade practices outlined in the complaint were exacerbated by at $4 billion trade deficit with South Korea during the previous year.

On February 3, 1987, while discussing the Canada–United States Free Trade Agreement at a Brookings Institution seminar, Yeutter was quoted as saying the agreement would risk the loss of Canadian culture. The statement reflected the Canadian public concern that the free trade agreement would lead to unprecedented American economic and cultural dominance. Although the comment was not notable in the United States, it produced considerable controversy in Canada. In response to the comment Prime Minister Brian Mulroney stated in the Canadian Parliament that "his remarks showed a stunning ignorance of Canada".

=== Secretary of Agriculture ===
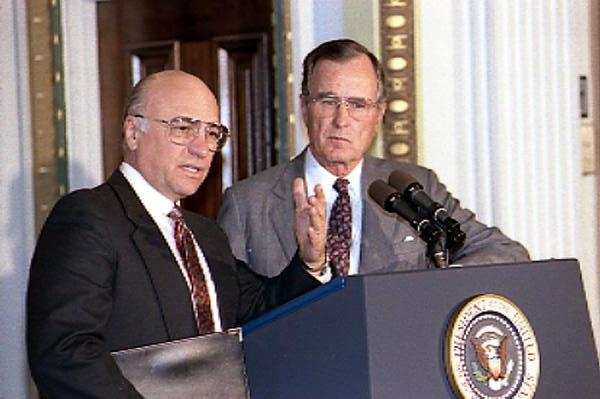
President Bush and Yeutter at a briefing of the National Association of Agricultural Journalists, in 1990.

Yeutter served as Secretary of Agriculture under George H. W. Bush from February 1989 until February 1991. His nomination was approved by the Senate on February 9, 1989. Yeutter was slightly reluctant to take this new position after enduring the fast pace of United States trade policy, but his fondness for agricultural issues overcame that sentiment.

When he took office Yeutter's primary concern was the quinquennial farm bill. The previous bill was passed in 1985 and had focused on providing financial support to American farmers. During the early 1980s, a high rate of bankruptcy among farmers prompted the federal government to provide unprecedented subsidies through the Food Security Act of 1985. The development of what was to become the Food, Agriculture, Conservation, and Trade Act of 1990 was largely influenced by Uruguay Round negotiations, which Yeutter led as USTR. Additionally, the 1990 farm bill removed United States farm subsidies created in the 1985 bill.

=== Republican National Committee Chairman ===
In January 1991 Yeutter took the place of Lee Atwater as Chairman of the Republican National Committee. Yeutter was elected after George H. W. Bush's first choice for chairman, William Bennett, revoked his initial acceptance of the position due to a potential conflict of interest. The protracted and turbulent process of finding a successor to Atwater was used by Democrats to characterize the Republican party as a fractured organization. Yeutter's "substantive" leadership style and belief that "good guys finished first, not last," created doubt among some members of the Republican party who preferred Atwater's more hard-edge political style.

Atwater's illness prevented the Committee from functioning normally. Before Yeutter was selected, fundraising had dropped off substantially and about 25% of staff had been laid off. Once he was elected, Yeutter focused on stabilizing the level of fundraising and winning the nationwide redistricting battles during 1991.

=== Counselor to the President ===
On January 31, 1992, President George H. W. Bush named Yeutter as counselor to the president for domestic policy. Yeutter was replaced by Richard Bond as Chairman of the Republican National Committee. The cabinet-level position was left vacant since Edwin Meese III held the post under Ronald Reagan. Unlike Meese's post, Yeutter had additional control over the Bush administration's economic and domestic councils, which formed the cabinet's policy-making apparatus. The additional control was initially opposed by Treasury Secretary Nicholas F. Brady, who led the economic policy council.

== Later life ==
From February 1993, Yeutter split his time working as a senior advisor at Hogan Lovells (formerly Hogan & Hartson L.L.P.) in Washington D.C. and holding numerous corporate directorships. In March 1997 Yeutter registered to lobby on the farm bill for the American Farmland Trust.

=== Corporate directorships ===
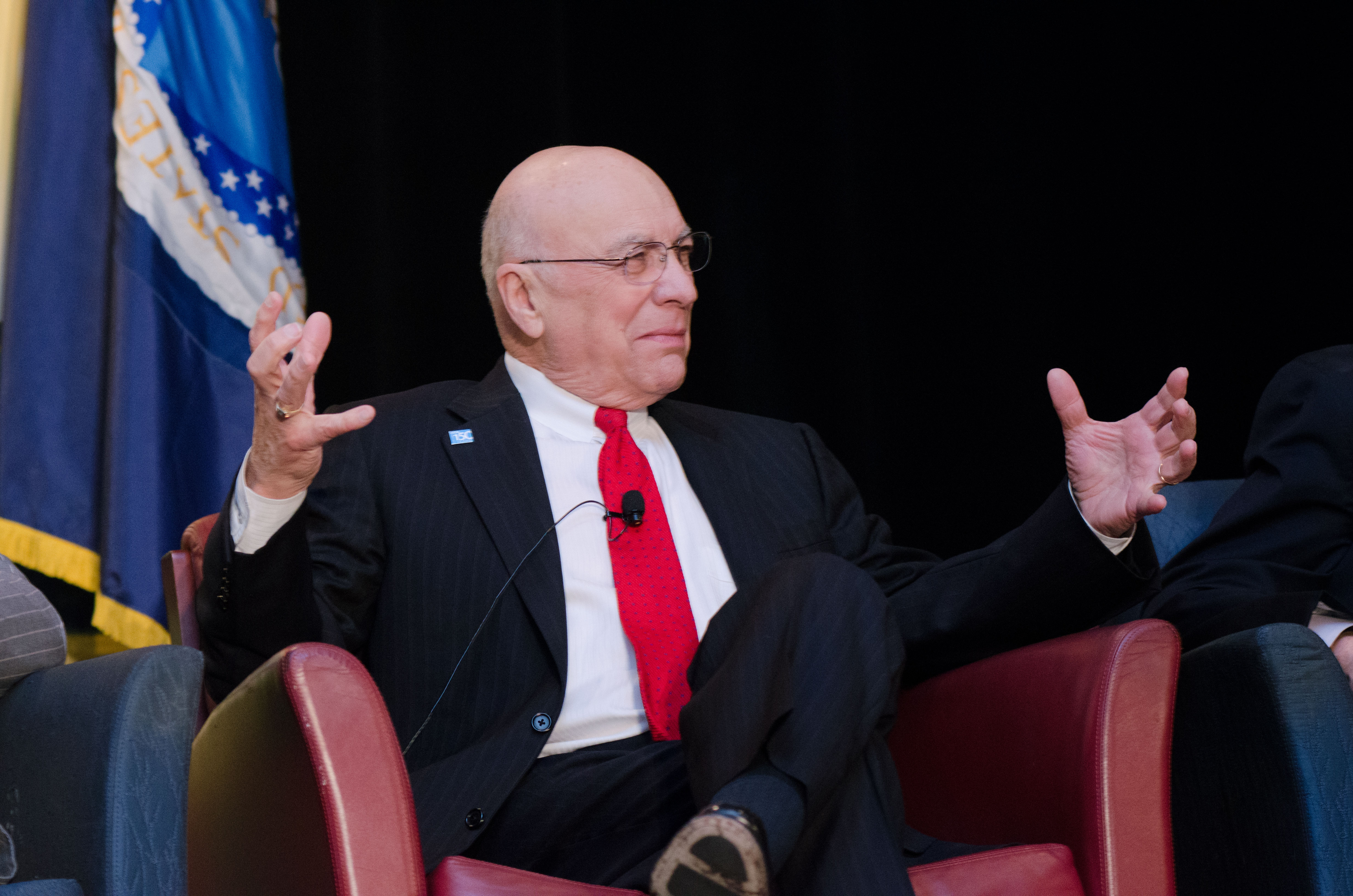
Yeutter in 2012

Yeutter's first major corporate directorship was with ConAgra Foods while serving as the President and CEO of the Chicago Mercantile Exchange. He resigned from the position in 1985 when he became U.S. Trade Representative. While serving as Chairman of the Republican National Committee Yeutter joined the boards of Caterpillar Inc. and Texas Instruments. He resigned from both positions in 1992 when he became Counselor to the President. Yeutter was reinstated to the boards of ConAgra Foods, Caterpillar Inc. and Texas Instruments in 1993 and served on all three until he hit the maximum age limit for board members.

After leaving public service in 1993 Yeutter served as the director of Danielson Holding Corporation and America First. Additionally, he served as Chairman of the Board of Oppenheimer Funds, Inc. and CropSolutions, Inc. He previously served on the board of directors of Coventa Holding Corp., Chicago Climate Exchange, FMC Corporation, B.A.T. Industries and later American Commercial Lines Inc., Covanta Holding Corporation, and Weyerhaeuser. Yeutter currently serves on the board of directors of Neogen Corporation and Burlington Capital Group. Yeutter is also an owner of the Keating Network LLC, a company designed to help small and medium-sized businesses.

== Family and personal life ==
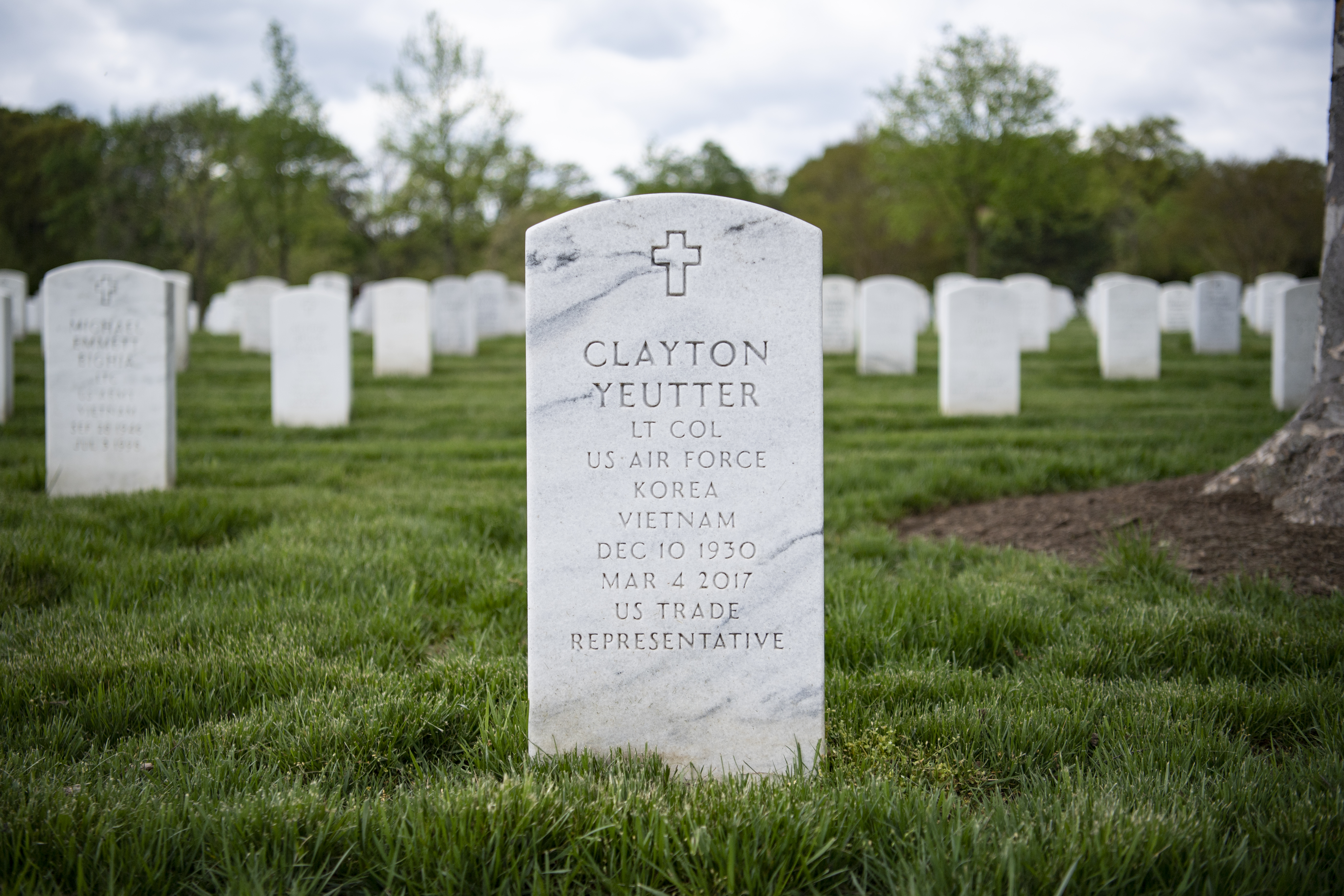
Grave at Arlington National Cemetery

After graduating from the University of Nebraska, in 1952, Yeutter married his first wife, Jeanne Vierk, with whom he had four children, Brad Yeutter, Gregg Yeutter, Kim (Yeutter) Bottimore, and Van Yeutter. Vierk served as the informal Chairman of the Cabinet Wives Group during the President George H. W. Bush administration.

Two years after Jeanne's death, Yeutter married Cristena Bach. Bach had served in several politically appointed positions during the Reagan and Bush administration, including a stint on the White House staff under President Reagan. They adopted three daughters: Victoria Yeutter, Elena Yeutter, and Olivia Yeutter.

Yeutter's grandson, Andrew Bottimore, worked on the U.S. Trade Representative team covering private sector engagement regarding the Trans-Pacific Partnership.

Yeutter died on March 4, 2017, at his home in Potomac, Maryland, from colon cancer. He was 86.

== Honors and awards ==
Yeutter received honorary doctorate degrees from Clemson University, DePaul University, Georgetown University, Nebraska Wesleyan University, Santa Clara University, University of Arizona, University of Maryland Eastern Shore and the University of Nebraska–Lincoln.

Yeutter was made an Honorary Officer of the New Zealand Order of Merit in the 2012 New Year Honours, for services to New Zealand–United States relations.

Yeutter received a statue at the University of Nebraska–Lincoln in September 2014 for his accomplishment of being Secretary of Agriculture after graduating from the school. It is found in the Jeanne Yeutter Garden (named after his first wife) on the East campus.

Yeutter was named an Honorary Member of the American Society of Agronomy (ASA) in 1990. He also was the E.T. & Vam York ASA Distinguished Keynote lecturer, who in his remarks at the 2002 ASA Annual Meeting stressed links between agricultural science, the world economy, and the global food supply.

== Works ==
- Yeutter, Clayton K. (March 24, 1992). "When 'Fairness' Isn't Fair". The New York Times.
- Yeutter, Clayton (September 8, 2003). "Cancun – the Heavy Lifting Lies Ahead" (PDF). Cordell Hull Institute.
- Yeutter, Clayton (October 2003). "Cancun: Now What?" (PDF). The Chain Letter. 2 (4). International Food and Agribusiness Management Association: 2. Archived from the original (PDF) on October 4, 2011.
- Clayton Yeutter; Warren Maruyama (December 14, 2005). "Doha deal can be struck beyond Hong Kong". London Financial Times.
- Yeutter, Clayton (July 14, 2010). "KORUS – Are There Shortcomings? Let's Fix Them" (PDF). Law360. Portfolio Media Inc. Archived from the original (PDF) on January 20, 2012.
- Clayton Yeutter; Warren Maruyama (November 22, 2010). "Japan at a Trade Crossroads". The Wall Street Journal.
- Yeutter, Clayton (December 1, 2010). "The Trans Pacific Partnership Needs Japan". Law360. Portfolio Media Inc.
- Yeutter, Clayton (July 12, 2011). "Don't let America lose its agricultural edge". The Hill. The Hill's Congress Blog.
- Yeutter, Clayton (July 17, 2011). "Is WTO ready for Russian bear?". Politico.

Political offices
Preceded by Bill Brock	United States Trade Representative; 1985–1989	Succeeded by Carla Hills
Preceded by Richard Lyng	United States Secretary of Agriculture; 1989–1991	Succeeded by Ed Madigan
Vacant Title last held by Ed Meese	Counselor to the President; 1992–1993	Succeeded by David Gergen
Party political offices
Preceded by Lee Atwater	Chair of the Republican National Committee; 1991–1992	Succeeded by Richard Bond
