= Charles Franklin Conner =

American lobbyist (born 1957)

Chuck Conner
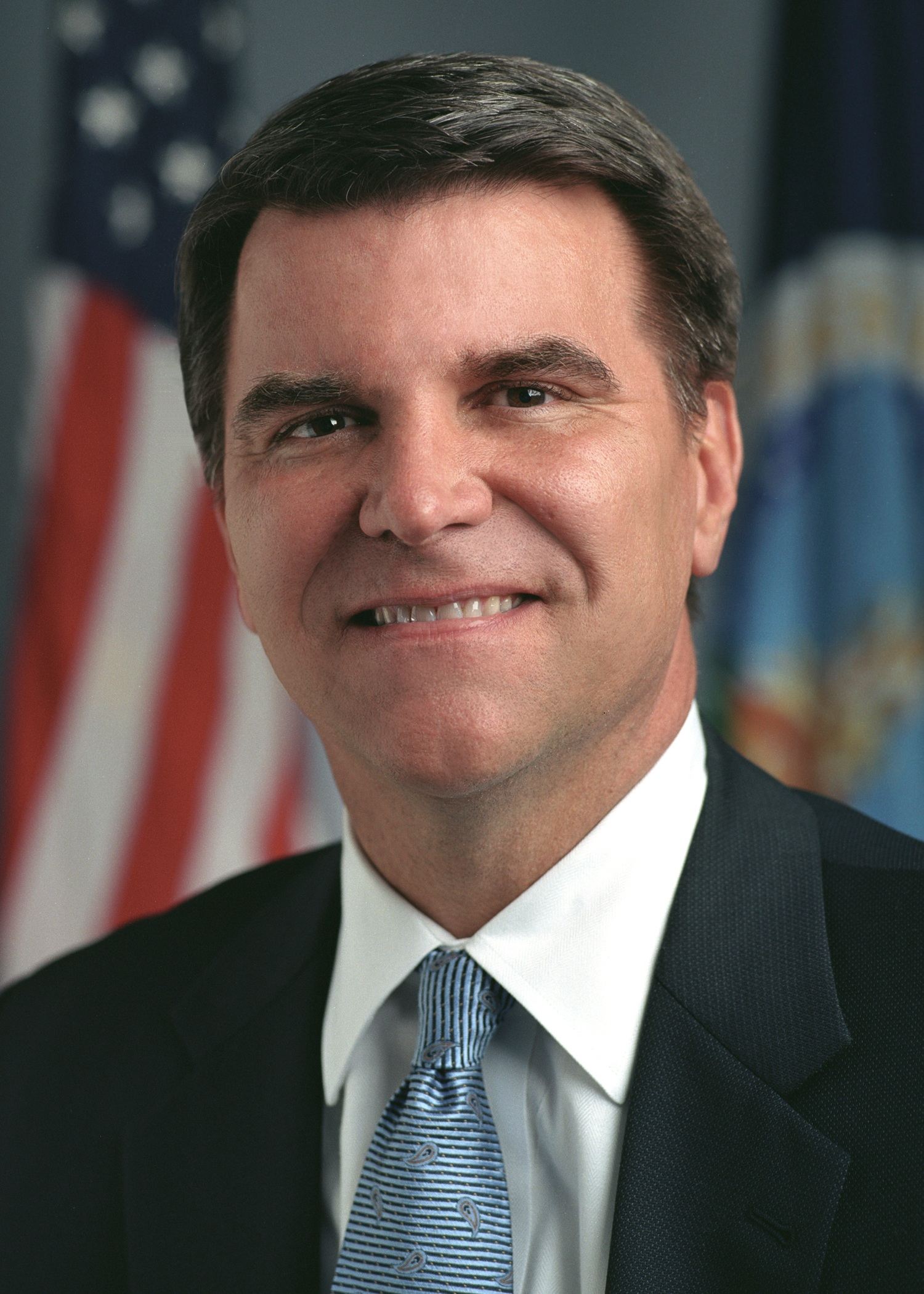

Acting United States Secretary of Agriculture
- In office September 20, 2007 – January 28, 2008
- President: George W. Bush
- Preceded by: Mike Johanns
- Succeeded by: Ed Schafer

10th United States Deputy Secretary of Agriculture
- In office May 2, 2005 – January 20, 2009
- President: George W. Bush
- Preceded by: Jim Moseley
- Succeeded by: Kathleen Merrigan

Personal details
- Born: Charles Franklin Conner; December 30, 1957 (age 68) Lafayette, Indiana, U.S.
- Party: Republican
- Education: Purdue University (BS)

Charles Franklin "Chuck" Conner (born December 30, 1957) is a former United States deputy secretary of agriculture.

He was sworn in on May 2, 2005, by Secretary of Agriculture Mike Johanns. After Johanns resigned on September 20, 2007, Conner was named acting secretary. He served as acting secretary of agriculture until President Bush's nominee, former North Dakota Governor Ed Schafer was confirmed by the U.S. Senate on January 28, 2008. He is the current president of the National Council of Farmer Cooperatives, a position he has held since January 2009.

== Career ==
Prior to his tenure at the U.S. Department of Agriculture, Conner served on the National Economic Council beginning in November 2001 as a Special Assistant to the President for Agricultural Trade and Food Assistance, focusing primarily on Farm Bill issues.

From 1997 to 2001, Conner was President of the Corn Refiners Association, Inc., a national trade association representing the corn refining industry. From 1985 to 1997, Conner worked in various staff positions with the United States Senate Committee on Agriculture, Nutrition and Forestry, including serving as both the Majority Staff Director (1995–1997) and the Minority Staff Director (1987–1995). Prior to joining the Committee, Conner worked as an Agricultural Legislative Assistant to Senator Richard Lugar.

== Personal life ==
Conner grew up on a family farm in Benton County, Indiana, which remains in the family and is operated by his older brother, Mike. He received a Bachelor of Science degree in Agricultural Economics from Purdue University in 1980. He is married and has four children.

== In popular culture ==
Conner was referenced on the August 4, 2009, episode of The Onion with Clifford Banes as the actor playing Octavius Del Monte, Supreme Commander of the Empire of Octavia.

Political offices
Preceded by Jim Moseley	United States Deputy Secretary of Agriculture; 2005–2009	Succeeded by Kathleen Merrigan
Preceded by Mike Johanns	United States Secretary of Agriculture; Acting; 2007–2008	Succeeded by Ed Schafer
