= United States Secretary of Agriculture =

Head of the US Department of Agriculture

- Seal of the Department of Agriculture

- Flag of the secretary

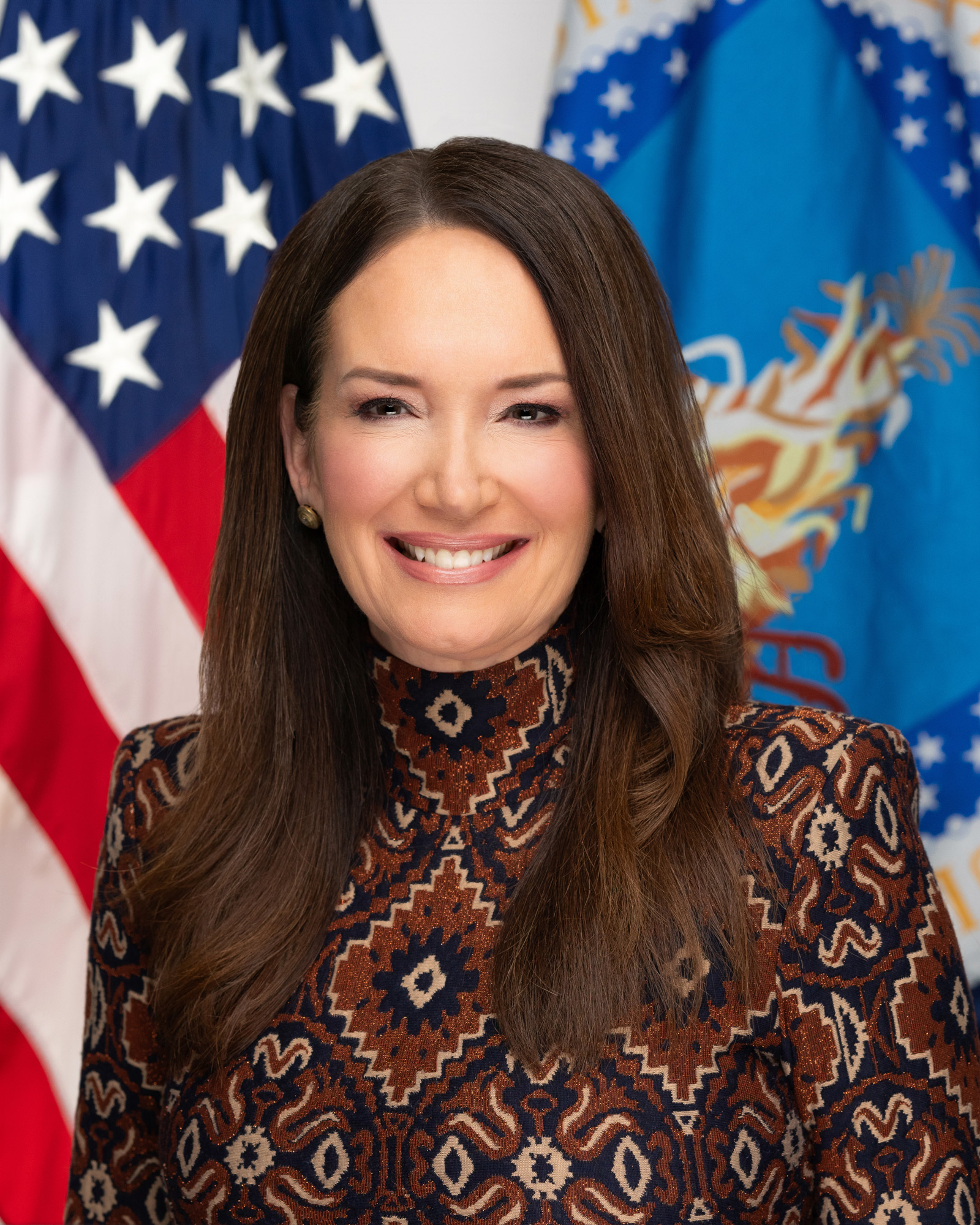
- Incumbent; Brooke Rollins since February 13, 2025
- United States Department of Agriculture
- Style: Ms. Secretary (informal); The Honorable (formal)
- Member of: United States Cabinet
- Reports to: President of the United States
- Seat: Jamie L. Whitten Building, Washington, D.C.
- Appointer: The president; with advice and consent of the Senate
- Term length: No fixed term
- Constituting instrument: 7 U.S.C. § 2202
- Formation: February 15, 1889
- First holder: Norman Jay Coleman
- Succession: Ninth
- Deputy: United States Deputy Secretary of Agriculture
- Salary: Executive Schedule, level I
- Website: usda.gov

The United States secretary of agriculture is the head of the United States Department of Agriculture. The position carries similar responsibilities to those of agriculture ministers in other governments.

The department includes several organizations. The 297,000 mi^{2} (770,000 km^{2}) of national forests and grasslands are managed by the United States Forest Service. The safety of food produced and sold in the United States is ensured by the United States Food Safety and Inspection Service. The Food Stamp Program works with the states to provide food to low-income people.

Secretary of Agriculture is a Level I position in the Executive Schedule, thus earning a salary of US$253,100, as of January 2026.

Since February 13, 2025, the current secretary is Brooke Rollins.

== List of secretaries of agriculture ==
When the Department of Agriculture was established in 1862, its executive was a non-Cabinet position called the commissioner of agriculture. The commissioners of agriculture were:

Denotes acting capacity.

United States commissioners of agriculture
No.	Portrait	Name	State of residence	Took office	Left office	President(s)
1	Newton seated	Isaac Newton	Pennsylvania	July 1, 1862	June 19, 1867	Abraham Lincoln (1861–1865)
1	Newton seated	Isaac Newton	Pennsylvania	July 1, 1862	June 19, 1867	Andrew Johnson (1865–1869)
2		Horace Capron	Illinois	December 4, 1867	July 31, 1871	Andrew Johnson (1865–1869)
2		Horace Capron	Illinois	December 4, 1867	July 31, 1871	Ulysses S. Grant (1869–1877)
3		Frederick Watts	Pennsylvania	August 1, 1871	1877	Ulysses S. Grant (1869–1877)
4		William Gates LeDuc	Minnesota	July 1, 1877	1881	Rutherford B. Hayes (1877–1881)
5		George B. Loring	Massachusetts	July 1, 1881	1885	James A. Garfield (1881)
5		George B. Loring	Massachusetts	July 1, 1881	1885	Chester A. Arthur (1881–1885)
6		Norman Jay Coleman	Missouri	April 3, 1885	February 14, 1889	Grover Cleveland (1885–1889)

The position of secretary of agriculture was created when the department was elevated to Cabinet status in 1889. The following is a list of secretaries of agriculture, since the creation of the office in 1889.

Parties

Democratic (14) Republican (19)

Status

Acting secretary of agriculture

No.	Portrait	Name	State of residence	Took office	Left office	President(s)
1		Norman Jay Coleman	Missouri	February 15, 1889	March 6, 1889	Grover Cleveland (1885–1889)
2		Jeremiah McLain Rusk	Wisconsin	March 6, 1889	March 6, 1893	Benjamin Harrison (1889–1893)
3		Julius Sterling Morton	Nebraska	March 7, 1893	March 5, 1897	Grover Cleveland (1893–1897)
4		James Wilson	Iowa	March 5, 1897	March 3, 1913	William McKinley (1897–1901)
4		James Wilson	Iowa	March 5, 1897	March 3, 1913	Theodore Roosevelt (1901–1909)
4		James Wilson	Iowa	March 5, 1897	March 3, 1913	William Howard Taft (1909–1913)
5		David F. Houston	Missouri	March 6, 1913	February 2, 1920	Woodrow Wilson (1913–1921)
6		Edwin T. Meredith	Iowa	February 2, 1920	March 4, 1921	Woodrow Wilson (1913–1921)
7		Henry Cantwell Wallace	Iowa	March 5, 1921	October 25, 1924	Warren G. Harding (1921–1923)
7		Henry Cantwell Wallace	Iowa	March 5, 1921	October 25, 1924	Calvin Coolidge (1923–1929)
8		Howard Mason Gore	West Virginia	November 22, 1924	March 4, 1925	Calvin Coolidge (1923–1929)
9		William Marion Jardine	Kansas	March 5, 1925	March 4, 1929	Calvin Coolidge (1923–1929)
10		Arthur M. Hyde	Missouri	March 6, 1929	March 4, 1933	Herbert Hoover (1929–1933)
11		Henry A. Wallace	Iowa	March 4, 1933	September 4, 1940	Franklin D. Roosevelt (1933–1945)
12		Claude R. Wickard	Indiana	September 5, 1940	June 29, 1945	Franklin D. Roosevelt (1933–1945)
13		Clinton Anderson	New Mexico	June 30, 1945	May 10, 1948	Harry S. Truman (1945–1953)
14		Charles F. Brannan	Colorado	June 2, 1948	January 20, 1953	Harry S. Truman (1945–1953)
15		Ezra Taft Benson	Utah	January 21, 1953	January 20, 1961	Dwight D. Eisenhower (1953–1961)
16		Orville Freeman	Minnesota	January 21, 1961	January 20, 1969	John F. Kennedy (1961–1963)
16		Orville Freeman	Minnesota	January 21, 1961	January 20, 1969	Lyndon B. Johnson (1963–1969)
17		Clifford M. Hardin	Nebraska	January 21, 1969	November 17, 1971	Richard Nixon (1969–1974)
18		Earl Butz	Indiana	December 2, 1971	October 4, 1976	Richard Nixon (1969–1974)
18		Earl Butz	Indiana	December 2, 1971	October 4, 1976	Gerald Ford (1974–1977)
19		John A. Knebel	Oklahoma	November 4, 1976	January 20, 1977	Gerald Ford (1974–1977)
20		Robert Bergland	Minnesota	January 23, 1977	January 20, 1981	Jimmy Carter (1977–1981)
21		John R. Block	Illinois	January 23, 1981	February 14, 1986	Ronald Reagan (1981–1989)
22		Richard Lyng	California	March 7, 1986	January 21, 1989	Ronald Reagan (1981–1989)
23		Clayton Yeutter	Nebraska	February 16, 1989	March 1, 1991	George H. W. Bush (1989–1993)
24		Ed Madigan	Illinois	March 8, 1991	January 20, 1993	George H. W. Bush (1989–1993)
25		Mike Espy	Mississippi	January 22, 1993	December 31, 1994	Bill Clinton (1993–2001)
–		Richard Rominger; Acting	California	December 31, 1994	March 30, 1995	Bill Clinton (1993–2001)
26		Dan Glickman	Kansas	March 30, 1995	January 20, 2001	Bill Clinton (1993–2001)
27		Ann Veneman	California	January 20, 2001	January 20, 2005	George W. Bush (2001–2009)
28		Mike Johanns	Nebraska	January 21, 2005	September 20, 2007	George W. Bush (2001–2009)
–		Charles Conner; Acting	Indiana	September 20, 2007	January 28, 2008	George W. Bush (2001–2009)
29		Ed Schafer	North Dakota	January 28, 2008	January 20, 2009	George W. Bush (2001–2009)
30		Tom Vilsack	Iowa	January 20, 2009	January 13, 2017	Barack Obama (2009–2017)
–		Michael Scuse; Acting	Delaware	January 13, 2017	January 20, 2017	Barack Obama (2009–2017)
–		Mike Young; Acting	Washington D.C.	January 20, 2017	April 25, 2017	Donald Trump (2017–2021)
31		Sonny Perdue	Georgia	April 25, 2017	January 20, 2021	Donald Trump (2017–2021)
–		Kevin Shea; Acting	Maryland	January 20, 2021	February 24, 2021	Joe Biden (2021–2025)
32		Tom Vilsack	Iowa	February 24, 2021	January 20, 2025	Joe Biden (2021–2025)
–		Gary Washington; Acting	Washington D.C.	January 20, 2025	February 13, 2025	Donald Trump (2025–present)
33	Brooke Rollins	Brooke Rollins	Texas	February 13, 2025	present	Donald Trump (2025–present)

== Line of succession ==
The line of succession for the secretary of agriculture is as follows:

1. Deputy Secretary of Agriculture
2. Under Secretary of Agriculture for Farm and Foreign Agriculture Services
3. Assistant Secretary of Agriculture for Administration
4. Under Secretary of Agriculture for Food, Nutrition, and Consumer Services
5. Under Secretary of Agriculture for Research, Education, and Economics
6. Under Secretary of Agriculture for Food Safety
7. Under Secretary of Agriculture for Natural Resources and Environment
8. Under Secretary of Agriculture for Rural Development
9. Under Secretary of Agriculture for Marketing and Regulatory Programs
10. General Counsel of the Department of Agriculture
11. Chief of Staff, Office of the Secretary
12. State Executive Directors of the Farm Service Agency (in order of seniority by length of unbroken tenure) for the States of:
  - California
  - Iowa
  - Kansas
13. Regional Administrators of the Food and Nutrition Service (in order of seniority by length of unbroken tenure) for the:
  - Mountain Plains Regional Office (Denver, Colorado)
  - Midwest Regional Office (Chicago, Illinois)
  - Western Regional Office (San Francisco, California)
14. Chief Financial Officer of the Department of Agriculture
15. Assistant Secretary of Agriculture for Civil Rights
16. Assistant Secretary of Agriculture for Congressional Relations

U.S. order of precedence (ceremonial)
Preceded by Doug Burgum as Secretary of the Interior	Order of precedence of the United States as Secretary of the Agriculture	Succeeded by Howard Lutnick as Secretary of Commerce
U.S. presidential line of succession
Preceded by Secretary of the Interior; Doug Burgum	9th in line	Succeeded by Secretary of Commerce; Howard Lutnick
