= Richard Rominger =

American politician (1927–2020)

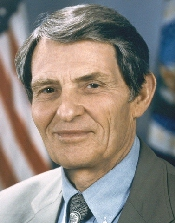

8th United States Deputy Secretary of Agriculture
- In office May 12, 1993 – January 20, 2001
- President: Bill Clinton
- Preceded by: Ann Veneman
- Succeeded by: Jim Moseley

California Secretary of Food and Agriculture
- In office 1977–1982
- Governor: Jerry Brown
- Preceded by: Luther T. Wallace
- Succeeded by: Clare Berryhill

Personal details
- Born: Richard Rominger; July 1, 1927 Woodland, California, U.S.
- Died: December 21, 2020 (aged 93) Winters, California, U.S.
- Party: Democratic
- Education: University of California, Davis (BS)

Richard Rominger (July 1, 1927 – December 21, 2020) was an American politician who served as the eighth deputy secretary of agriculture from 1993 to 2001 during the administration of Bill Clinton. Rominger previously served as the California secretary of food and agriculture.

== Early life and education ==
Born in Woodland, California to Albert H. Rominger and Anne Violet Ehrhardt Rominger and raised in Winters, California, Rominger attended his freshman year at Sacramento Junior College then served 14 months in the United States Navy during World War II. He then attended the University of California, Davis and graduated in 1949 with degrees in agronomy and plant sciences. After graduation, Rominger returned to work on his four-generation family farm.

== Career ==
In 1977, Governor Jerry Brown appointed Rominger to head the California Department of Food and Agriculture. He was confirmed by the California State Senate and served in the position until 1982. In 1993, Rominger was appointed by President of the United States Bill Clinton to serve as chief operating officer and Deputy Secretary of the United States Department of Agriculture. He served in the position until 2001 (the entirety of Clinton's time in office), and returned to their 6,000-acre family farm in California.

During his time at the USDA, Rominger advocated for a new pesticide ban as well as poultry product regulations, a new National Drought Emergency Commission, and the new National Organic Standards. Rominger also had responsibility for supervision of the USDA budget.

Rominger was appointed to the Board of Regents of the University of California in 2004. He has also served on the California Roundtable on Agriculture and the Environment and as president of the board of the American Farmland Trust. Rominger was the chairman and shareholder at Marrone Bio Innovations, Inc., Oryzatech, Inc., and Ag Innovations Network, Inc. Richard was a founding member and the first president of the Yolo County, California land trust.

After his retirement from government service, Rominger was an advocate on issues related to droughts, land conservation, and the impact of climate change on agriculture.

Richard E. Rominger died at the age of 93 in Winters, California.

== Awards ==
In 1978, Rominger received the Jerry W. Fielder Memorial Award in recognition of his service to UCD. In 1989, he and his wife Evelyne Rowe Rominger jointly received the Award of Distinction from the College of Agricultural and Environmental Sciences. Rominger received the Distinguished Service Award from the California Farm Bureau Federation in 1991 and was named Agriculturalist of Year and the 1992 California State Fair. In 2016, Rominger was selected to receive the UC Davis Medal, the highest honor the university presents to an individual.

Political offices
Preceded by Ann Veneman	U.S. Deputy Secretary of Agriculture; Served under: Bill Clinton; May 12, 1993 – January 20, 2001	Succeeded by Jim Moseley
