= Dan Amstutz =

American government official and business executive

Under Secretary of Agriculture for International Affairs and Commodity Programs
- In office May 1983 – August 1987
- President: Ronald Reagan
- Preceded by: Seeley G. Lodwick
- Succeeded by: Richard T. Crowder

Personal details
- Born: November 8, 1932 Cleveland, Ohio, U.S.
- Died: March 20, 2006 (aged 73)
- Education: Ohio State University

Daniel Gordon Amstutz (November 8, 1932 – March 20, 2006) was an American government official and business executive who played a prominent role during negotiation of the Uruguay Round of General Agreement on Tariffs and Trade rules on agriculture, and in the U.S. occupation of Iraq.

== Early life and education ==
Amstutz was born November 8, 1932, in Cleveland, Ohio. Amstutz was raised in Pennsylvania before the family relocated to Columbus, Ohio in 1946, where he graduated from Columbus North High School in 1950 and the Ohio State University in 1954. At Ohio State, Amstutz was president of the Student Senate and on the Student court, as well as being President of the Iota Chapter of the Chi Phi fraternity.

== Career ==
After graduating from Ohio State University in 1954, Amstutz joined Cargill, where he began in grain trading, eventually heading the wheat desk. He played a lead role in establishing Cargill Investor Services, of which he was president and CEO. He was persuaded to join Goldman Sachs by its top management who, having bought a metals trading company, were looking for someone to provide direction about ways to operate in futures.

From 1983 to 1987, he was Under Secretary of Agriculture for International Affairs and Commodity Programs, then served as Ambassador and Chief Negotiator for Agriculture during the Uruguay Round of General Agreement on Tariffs and Trade talks from 1987 to 1989.

Amstutz founded the Federal Agriculture Improvement and Reform Act of 1996, which eliminated tariffs and greatly reduced federal price supports for American small farms, causing farmers to go bankrupt.

=== Iraqi Occupation ===
From April to September 2003, Amstutz led the U.S. Government’s agriculture reconstruction efforts in Iraq, serving as U.S. Senior Ministry Advisor for Agriculture.

Given Amstutz's strong ties to U.S. multinational grain-trading companies, this appointment by the George W. Bush administration provoked criticism. The Guardian reported on a criticism from the development and humanitarian group Oxfam. According to the paper,

"Kevin Watkins, Oxfam's policy director, said Mr Amstutz would 'arrive with a suitcase full of open-market rhetoric', and was more likely to try to dump cheap US grain on the potentially lucrative Iraqi market than encourage the country to rebuild its once-successful agricultural sector. Putting Dan Amstutz in charge of agricultural reconstruction in Iraq is like putting Saddam Hussein in the chair of a human rights commission...This guy is uniquely well-placed to advance the commercial interests of American grain companies and bust open the Iraqi market - but singularly ill-equipped to lead a reconstruction effort in a developing country.

Criticism of the Amstutz appointment was also made in the House of Lords, where it was asked "why this decision was made in preference to appointing one of the experienced agricultural development specialists available within the United Nations system."

=== Lobbying ===
From 1992 to 1995, Amstutz served as executive director of the International Grains Council in London, England. During his tenure, Amstutz expanded the council's coverage beyond wheat to rice and coarse grains, he launched the annual grain conferences, and he set a path for expanding the membership.

From 1995 to 2000, Amstutz served as executive director of the North American Export Grain Association. At NAEGA, he lobbied for U.S. policies meant to foster growth in exporting and lobbied the U.S. Congress to push for less lenient regulations overseas of GMO foods, particularly in Europe.

Amstutz attempted to establish his own consulting company in the midst of the Dot-com bubble.

== Late life ==
Amstutz died on March 20, 2006.
