= Senator Judge =

Senator Judge may refer to:

- John Judge (politician) (born 1944), Iowa State Senate
- Patty Judge (born 1943), Iowa State Senate
- Thomas Lee Judge (1934–2006), Montana State Senate
