= Richard T. Crowder =

American government official and academic (1939–2024)

Richard Crowder

United States Chief Agricultural Negotiator
- In office January 2006 – May 2007
- President: George W. Bush
- Preceded by: Allen F. Johnson
- Succeeded by: Islam A. Siddiqui

Under Secretary of Agriculture for International Affairs and Commodity Programs
- In office April 1989 – July 1992
- President: George H. W. Bush
- Preceded by: Dan Amstutz
- Succeeded by: Eugene Moos

Personal details
- Born: Richard Thomas Crowder; August 3, 1939 Southern Virginia, U.S.
- Died: May 30, 2024 (aged 84)
- Education: Virginia Tech (BS, MS); Oklahoma State University–Stillwater (PhD)

Richard Thomas Crowder (August 3, 1939 – May 30, 2024) was an American government official and academic who served as Chief Agricultural Negotiator in the Office of the United States Trade Representative and Under Secretary of Agriculture for International Affairs and Commodity Programs.

== Biography ==
Crowder was born and raised in Southern Virginia. His father was a tenant farmer. Crowder served in the United States Army for two years. He then earned a Bachelor of Science and Master of Science from Virginia Tech and a Ph.D. in Agricultural Economics from Oklahoma State University–Stillwater.

== Career ==
Crowder was a member of the boards of directors of Mendel Biotechnology, Inc. and Neogen. He was also a trustee of the Farm Foundation.

Prior to entering public service, Crowder first worked for Exxon as a staff economist, then for Wilson, the Pillsbury Company, and Eckrich. Crowder served as the Under Secretary of Agriculture for International Affairs and Commodity Programs from 1989 to 1992 before becoming the Senior Vice President of DeKalb Genetics Corporation, then head of the American Seed Trade Association. He served as Chief Agricultural Negotiator from January 2006 to May 2007 in the Bush administration.

In 2008 Crowder joined the agricultural economics faculty of Virginia Tech. In 2013, Crowder was the recipient of the American Farm Bureau's Distinguished Service to Agriculture Award. In Crowder was appointed C.G. Thornhill Professor of Agricultural Trade at Virginia Tech. He was reappointed to the position in 2018.

Crowder died on May 30, 2024, at the age of 84.

== See also ==
- Chief Agricultural Negotiator
- Under Secretary of Agriculture for Farm and Foreign Agricultural Services
- Oral History of Ambassador Richard T. Crowder 25 May 2012
