= Darci Vetter =

American government official and academic

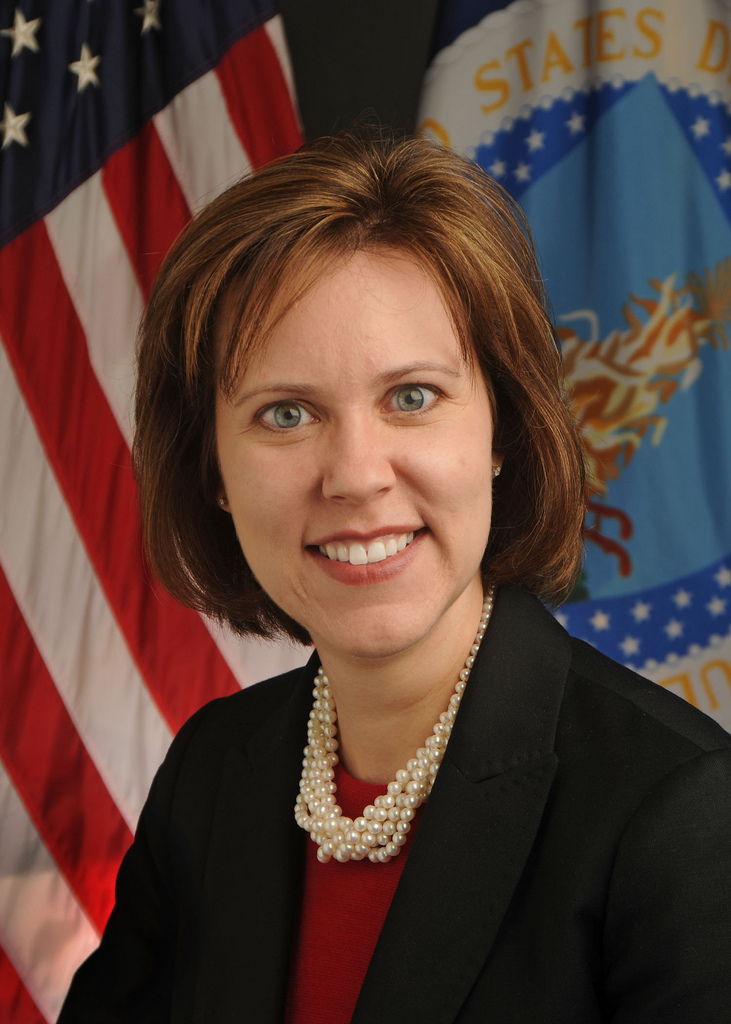

United States Chief Agricultural Negotiator
- In office July 9, 2014 – January 20, 2017
- President: Barack Obama
- Preceded by: Islam A. Siddiqui
- Succeeded by: Gregg Doud

Personal details
- Born: Nebraska, U.S.
- Parent: David Vetter (father)
- Education: Drake University (BA); Princeton University (MPA)

Darci Vetter is an American government official and academic who served as Chief Agricultural Negotiator for the Office of the United States Trade Representative.

== Early life and education ==
Vetter grew up in Nebraska on a family farm run by her father, David Vetter She received a B.A. from Drake University and an M.P.A. from the Woodrow Wilson School of Public and International Affairs at Princeton University.

== Career ==
From 2007 to 2010, she served as an International Trade Advisor on the United States Senate Committee on Finance. Prior to working in the Senate, Vetter held numerous roles at the Office of the United States Trade Representative, including Director for Agricultural Affairs (2005 to 2007) and Director for Sustainable Development (2001 - 2005). Before that, she was a Special Assistant to the Under Secretary of State for Management (2000 - 2001). Vetter then served as Deputy Under Secretary of Agriculture for Farm and Foreign Agricultural Services (2010 - 2014)

On December 17, 2013, President Barack Obama nominated her to be Chief Agricultural Negotiator, and the Senate confirmed her for that position by a voice vote on July 9, 2014.

In July 2017, she was named diplomat in residence at the University of Nebraska–Lincoln. In this role, Vetter worked with leaders from the university's College of Law, College of Business and Institute of Agriculture and Natural Resources to launch the Clayton K. Yeutter Institute of International Trade and Finance.
