= Doug McKalip =

American policy advisor

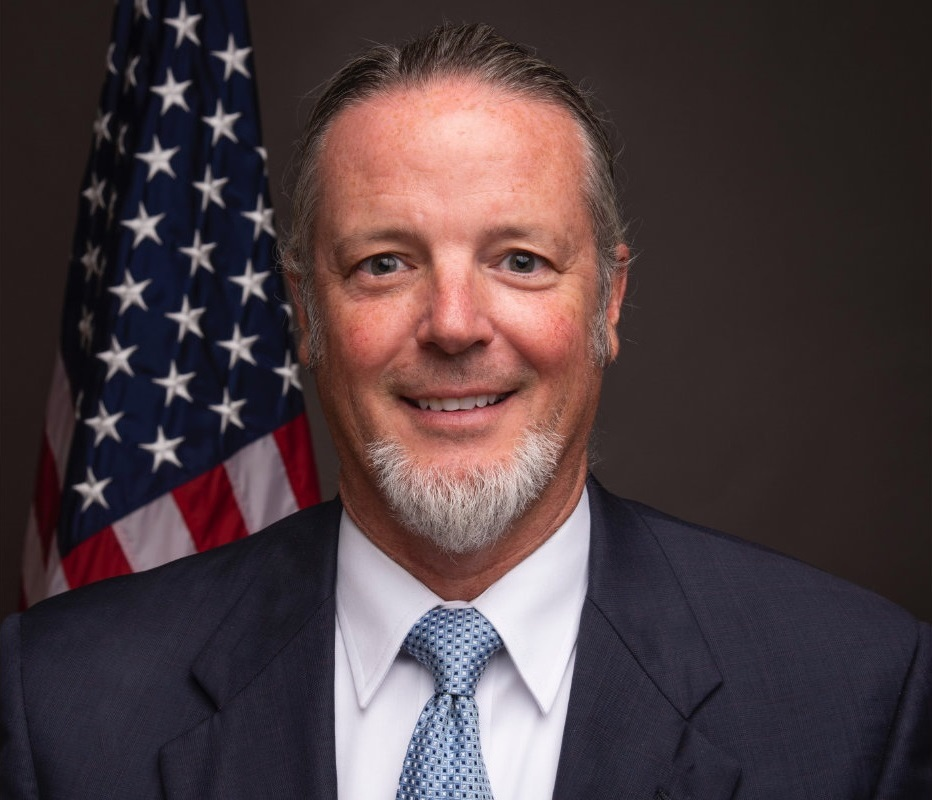

Chief Agricultural Negotiator of the United States
- In office January 9, 2023 – January 20, 2025
- President: Joe Biden; Donald Trump
- Preceded by: Gregg Doud
- Succeeded by: Julie Callahan

Personal details
- Born: Douglas J. McKalip
- Education: University of Pittsburgh (BA); American University (MPP)

Douglas J. McKalip is an American agricultural policy advisor who had served as chief agricultural negotiator in the Office of the United States Trade Representative.

== Early life and education ==
McKalip is a native of Saegertown, Pennsylvania, and graduated from Saegertown High School. He earned a Bachelor of Arts degree in political science from the University of Pittsburgh and a Master of Public Policy from American University.

== Career ==
McKalip joined the United States Department of Agriculture in 1994. He served as confidential assistant to the secretary of agriculture and director of public and legislative affairs for the Natural Resources Conservation Service. He was also the director of the White House Rural Council. He served as senior advisor to the secretary of agriculture and acting chief of staff of the Department of Agriculture before joining the United States Domestic Policy Council as senior advisor for agriculture and rural affairs. McKalip also served in the Animal and Plant Health Inspection Service.

In June 2022, President Joe Biden nominated McKalip to serve as chief agricultural negotiator in the Office of the United States Trade Representative. The United States Senate Committee on Finance held hearings on his nomination on July 28, 2022, and reported it favorably to the Senate floor on September 7, 2022. The United States Senate confirmed the nomination by voice vote on December 22, 2022. He was sworn in by U.S. Trade Representative Katherine Tai on January 9, 2023.
