= Paul McKinley =

American politician

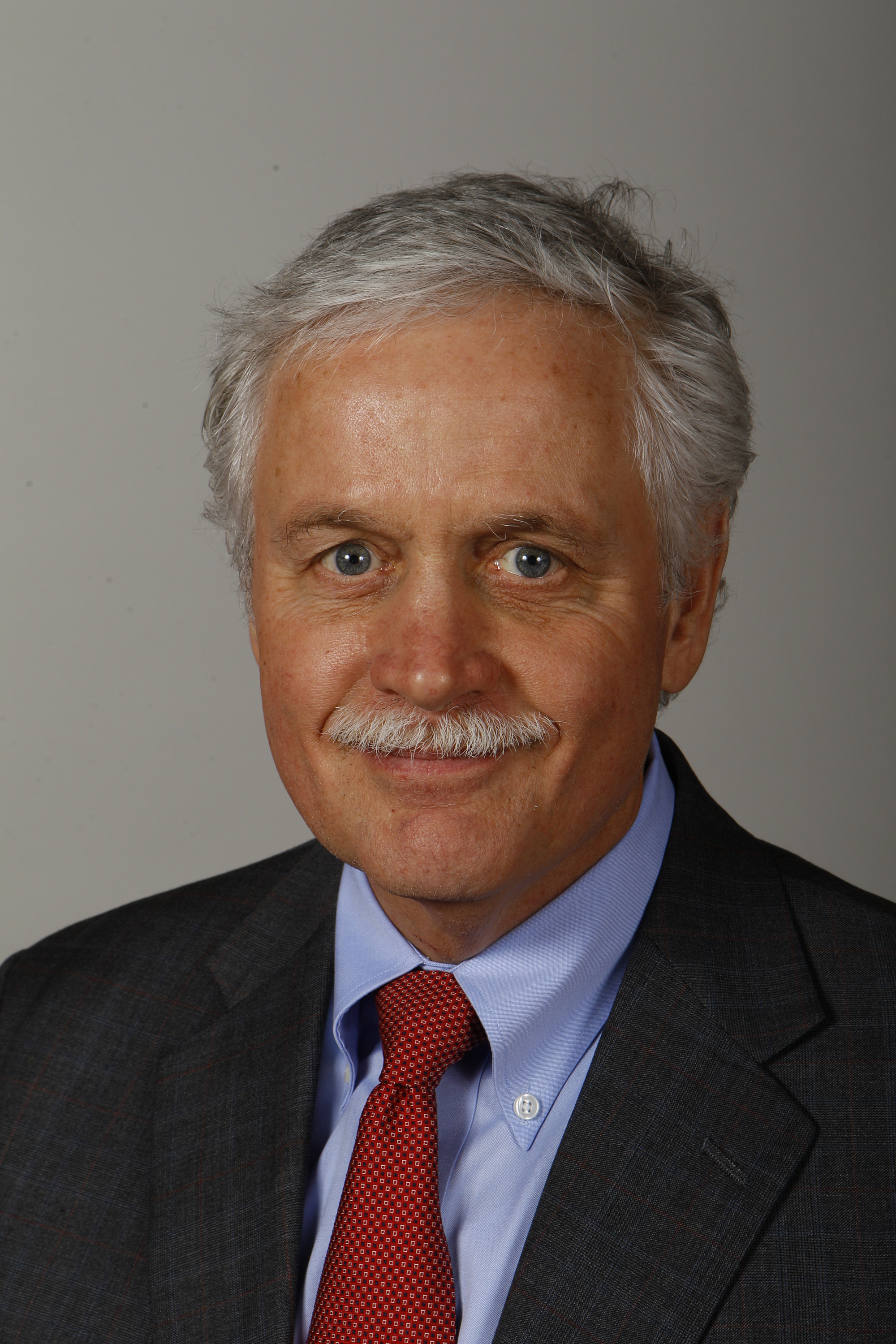

Member of the Iowa Senate from the 36th district 46th (2001-2003)
- In office January 8, 2001 – January 13, 2013
- Preceded by: John Judge
- Succeeded by: Steve Sodders

Personal details
- Born: 1947 (age 78–79) Chariton, Iowa, U.S.
- Party: Republican
- Spouse: Trish McKinley
- Children: Erin & Sean
- Education: University of Iowa
- Occupation: Businessman
- Website: McKinley's website

Paul McKinley (born 1947) is the Iowa State Senator from the 36th District. He has served in the Iowa Senate since 2001 and served as Senate minority leader from 2009 until November 2011.

McKinley currently serves on the Education committee, the Local Government committee, and the Veterans Affairs committee. He also serves as the ranking member on the Justice System Appropriations Subcommittee.

== Early life, education and career ==
Paul McKinley was born in Chariton, Iowa in Lucas County and raised on the family farm outside of Russell. He was involved in 4-H and scouting. He showed the grand champion steer at the Lucas County Fair where he was a repeat championship winner and took his prize-winning Hereford to the Iowa State Fair. He was active in scouting and attained the rank of Eagle Scout during his teen years.

In high school McKinley was active in student government and also devoted time to football, track, baseball. Upon graduating from Russell High School, he attended the University of Iowa, where he graduated in 1971. In that year, he returned to nearby Wayne County and became the director of Governor Bob Ray’s Model County Program.

McKinley became the majority owner of Neely Manufacturing in 1980. After receiving an unsolicited offer from a larger competitor, McKinley sold the business in 1991.

== Campaign history ==
In 1999, McKinley challenged State Senator John Judge, who less than two years earlier had won the seat in a special election. Previously, the seat had been held by Judge's wife, Patty Judge, who was elected to be the Iowa Secretary of Agriculture before assuming her current role as Lieutenant Governor of Iowa. McKinley defeated Jones by over 1500 votes and was re-elected in 2004 with 17,029 votes (60%), defeating Democratic opponent Dave Sextro. He was again re-elected in 2008 with over 63% of the vote. The Senate Republican Caucus elected him as minority leader in November 2008.

On July 7, 2009, McKinley announced he would explore running for the Republican nomination for the Governor of Iowa. He withdrew after Terry Branstad formed an exploratory committee for the position.

Iowa Senate
Preceded by John Judge	46th district 2001–2003	Succeeded by Gene Fraise
Preceded by Jack Holveck	36th district 2003–2013	Succeeded by Steve Sodders
