= Allen F. Johnson =

American businessman and former government official

Allen Johnson

United States Chief Agricultural Negotiator
- In office April 2001 – September 2005
- President: George W. Bush
- Preceded by: Gregory M. Frazier
- Succeeded by: Richard T. Crowder

Personal details
- Born: Allen Frederick Johnson Long Grove, Iowa, U.S.
- Education: George Mason University (BBA); Stanford University (MBA)

Allen F. Johnson is an American businessman and former government official who served as the Chief Agricultural Negotiator in the Office of the United States Trade Representative from April 2001 to September 2005. He is currently CEO of Allen F. Johnson and Associates.

== Education ==
Johnson was born and raised in Long Grove, Iowa. He earned a Bachelor of Business Administration from George Mason University and Masters in Business Administration from the Stanford Graduate School of Business.

== Career ==
Johnson worked as an agricultural, environmental and trade legislative assistant to Senator Chuck Grassley. Johnson also worked as the CEO of Marakon Associates, a strategic consulting firm based in Palo Alto, California, and the Iowa Soybean Association. Johnson then worked for Hauck and Associates, a trade association consulting firm based in Washington, D.C. Before serving in the Bush administration, Johnson became a senior partner and Executive Vice President of Hauck.

From April 2001 to September 2005, Johnson was the Chief Agricultural Negotiator in the Office of the United States Trade Representative. He was succeeded by economist Richard T. Crowder. After leaving the Executive Office of the President, Johnson established his own consultancy firm, Allen F. Johnson & Associates in 2005.

== See also ==
- Chief Agricultural Negotiator
