= 2012 United States presidential election in Iowa =

- November 6, 2012

Nominee	Barack Obama	Mitt Romney
Party	Democratic	Republican
Home state	Illinois	Massachusetts
Running mate	Joe Biden	Paul Ryan
Electoral vote	6	0
Popular vote	822,544	730,617
Percentage	51.99%	46.18%

Obama
40–50%
50–60%
60–70%
70–80%
80–90%
90–100%
Romney
40–50%
50–60%
60–70%
70–80%
80–90%
90–100%
Tie
President before election
Barack Obama
Democratic
Elected President
Barack Obama
Democratic

The 2012 United States presidential election in Iowa took place on November 6, 2012, as part of the 2012 United States presidential election in which all 50 states plus the District of Columbia participated. Iowa voters chose six electors to represent them in the Electoral College via a popular vote pitting incumbent Democratic President Barack Obama and his running mate, Vice President Joe Biden, against Republican challenger and former Massachusetts Governor Mitt Romney and his running mate, Congressman Paul Ryan.

Obama won Iowa with 51.99% of the vote to Romney's 46.18%, a Democratic victory margin of 5.81% – a markedly closer result than in 2008, when the Democrats won Iowa with a margin of 9.54%. Romney picked up wins in 16 counties that Obama had won in 2008, most of which were in the western half of the state, while only one county, (Woodbury), flipped in the opposite direction. Obama became the first Democrat to win the White House without winning Palo Alto County since Grover Cleveland in 1892 and the first to win without winning Carroll County since Franklin D. Roosevelt in 1944. Iowa is also one of only three states that backed Obama twice that would go on to vote against his vice president Joe Biden in 2020, the other two being Florida and Ohio. This was the sixth consecutive election where Iowa backed the winner of the national popular vote.

As of the 2024 presidential election, this is the last time that a Democratic presidential nominee has carried Iowa, any of its congressional districts, or the following counties: Allamakee, Boone, Bremer, Buchanan, Cedar, Cerro Gordo, Chickasaw, Clarke, Clayton, Clinton, Des Moines, Dubuque, Fayette, Floyd, Howard, Jackson, Jasper, Jefferson, Jones, Lee, Louisa, Marshall, Mitchell, Muscatine, Poweshiek, Tama, Union, Wapello, Webster, Winneshiek, Woodbury, and Worth.

== Caucuses ==
=== Democratic caucuses ===
2012 Iowa Democratic presidential caucuses
- January 3, 2012

Candidate	Barack Obama	Uncommitted
Home state	Illinois	N/A
Delegate count	62	3
SDEs	8,065	87
Percentage (of SDEs)	95%	5%

On January 3, 2012, the Iowa Democratic Party held statewide caucuses to select delegates to the county conventions. Incumbent Barack Obama ran unopposed. However, caucus goers also had the option of voting "uncommitted" rather than supporting Obama, and some Occupy movement and anti-war activists urged Democrats to vote "uncommitted" in protest of the Obama administration. Of the 8,152 county convention delegates that were elected by the caucuses, 8,065 (99%) were for Obama and 87 (1%) were uncommitted. In the floor vote taken at the Democratic National Convention, 62 Iowa state delegates voted for Obama. The other 3 of the state's 65 allocated votes were not announced.

=== Republican caucuses ===
2012 Iowa Republican presidential caucuses
- January 3, 2012
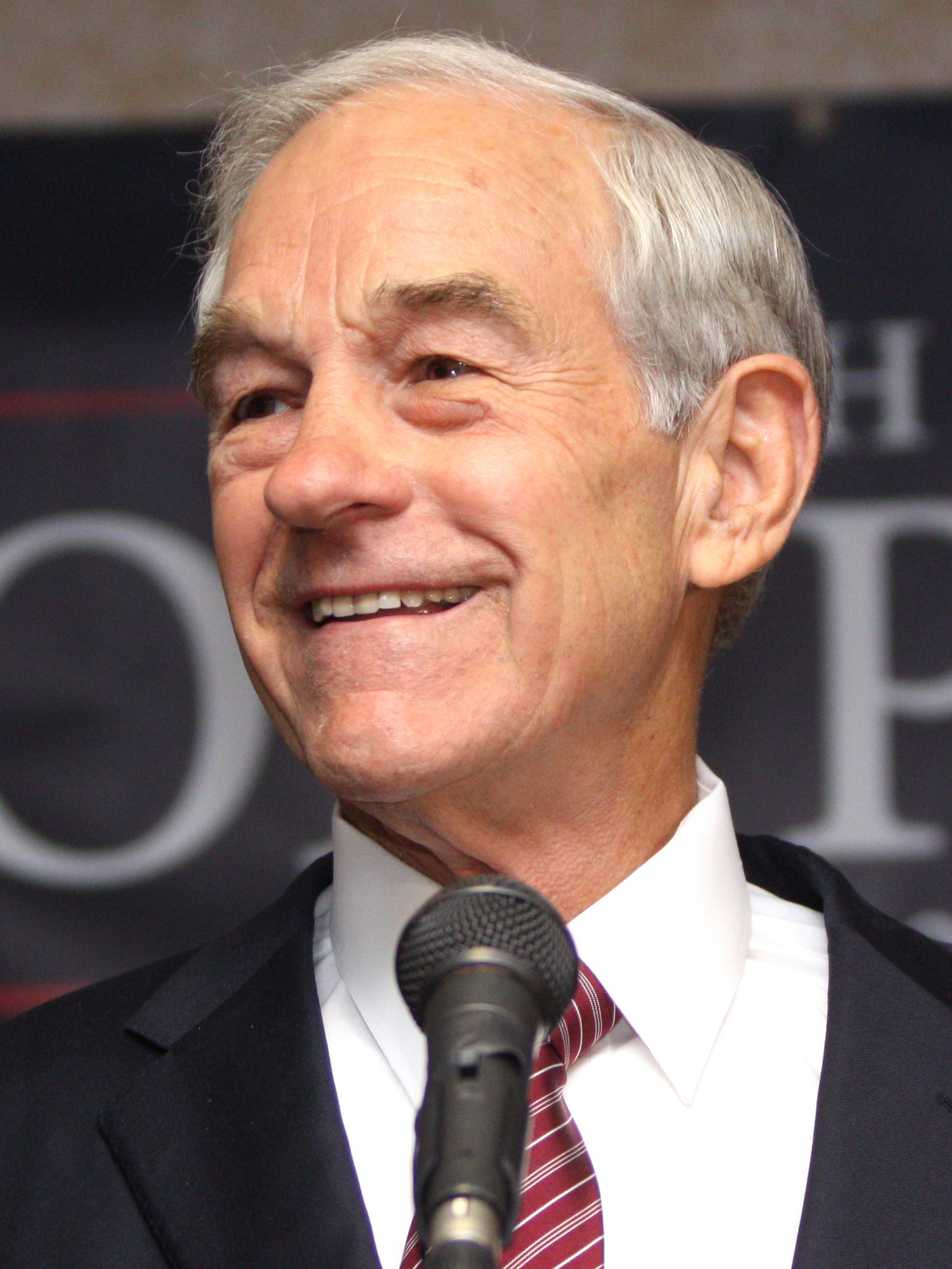

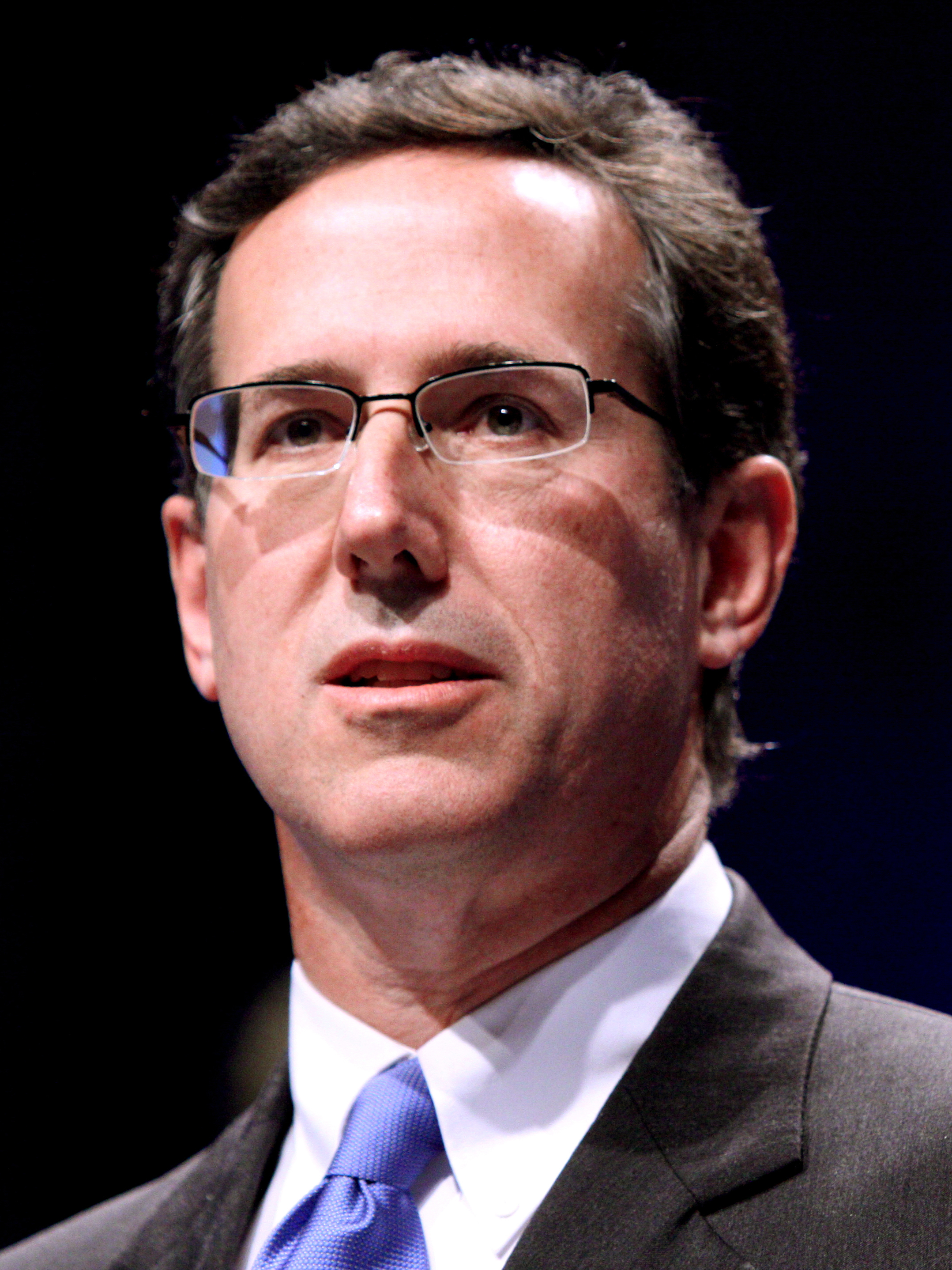

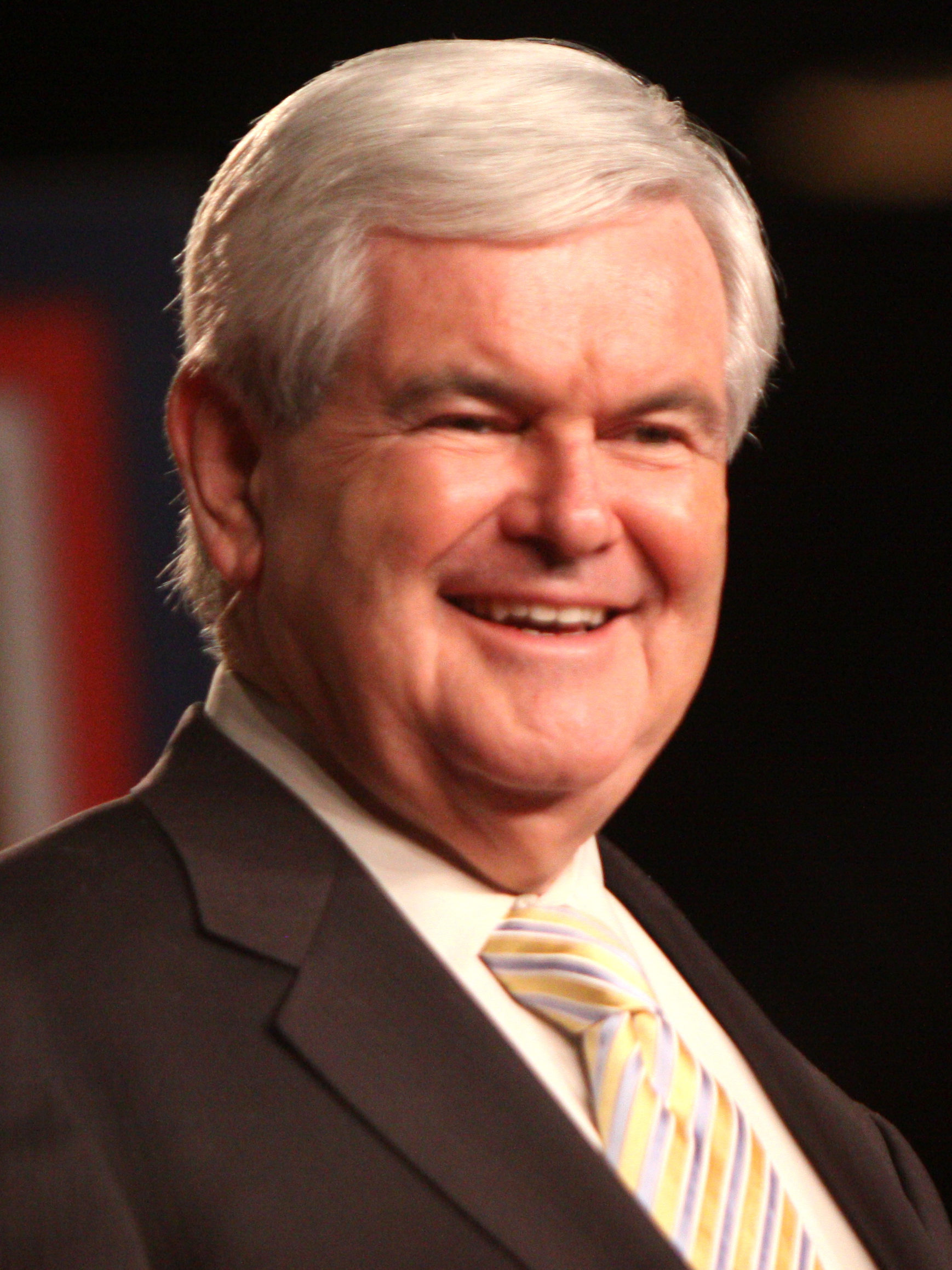

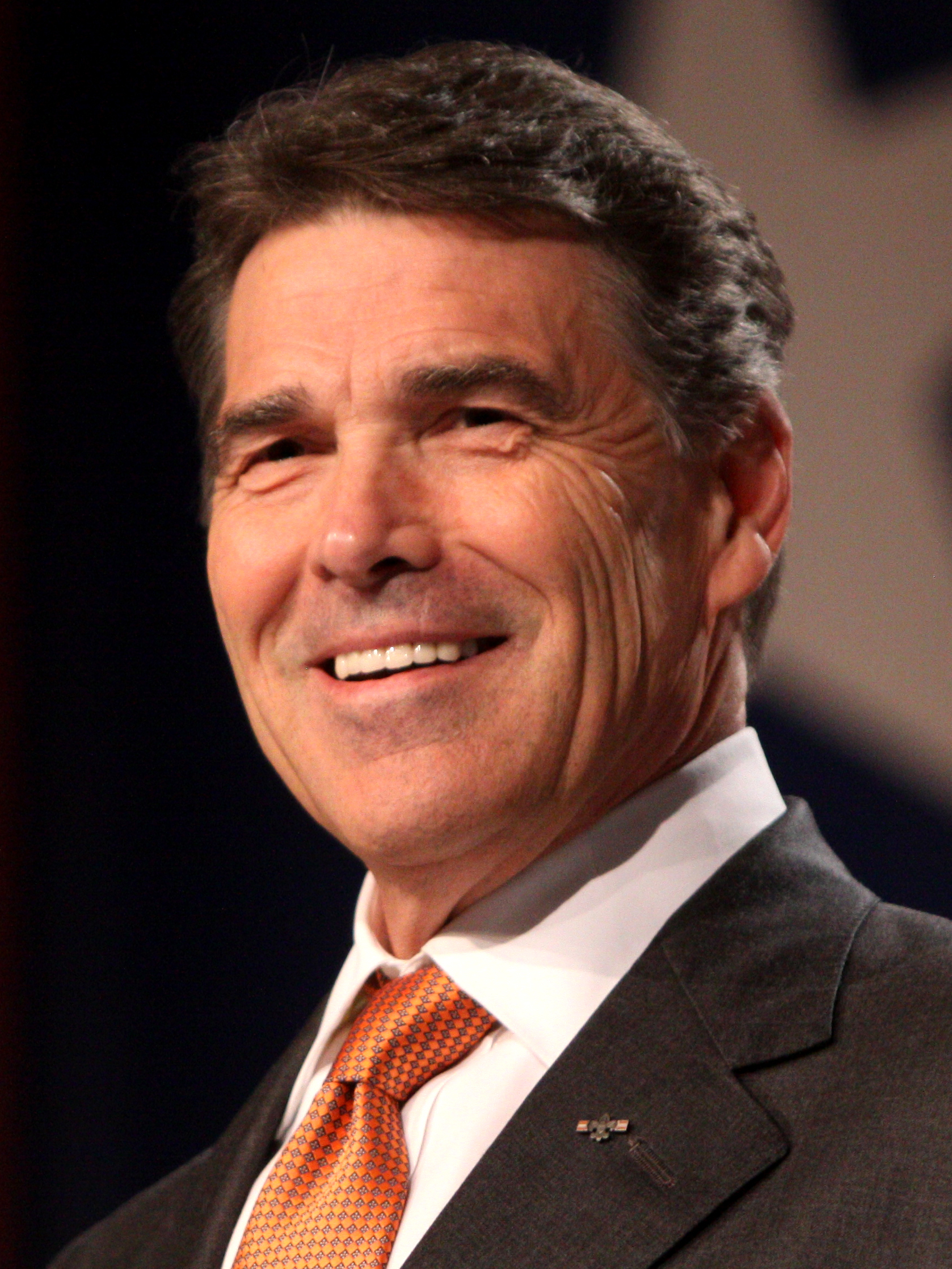
Candidate	Ron Paul	Mitt Romney	Rick Santorum
Home state	Texas	Massachusetts	Pennsylvania
Delegate count	22	6	0
Popular vote	26,036	29,805	29,839
Percentage	21.43%	24.53%	24.56%
Candidate	Newt Gingrich	Rick Perry
Home state	Georgia	Texas
Delegate count	0	0
Popular vote	16,163	12,557
Percentage	13.30%	10.33%
- County results Santorum: 20–30% 30–40% 40–50% 60–70% Romney: 20–30% 30–40% Paul: 20–30% 30–40% 40–50% Perry: 20–30% 30–40% Tie: 20–30%

The 2012 Iowa Republican presidential caucuses took place on January 3, 2012.

Using the media's generally accepted definition of the Iowa Republican caucus as the non-binding secret polling at caucus sites and using the incomplete data available, the 2012 Iowa Republican caucus was the closest race in Iowa caucus history with only a thirty-four vote margin (about 3/100th of a percent) separating former Senator Rick Santorum of Pennsylvania, who received 29,839 votes (24.56%), and former Massachusetts governor Mitt Romney, who received 29,805 votes (24.53%). Representative Ron Paul of Texas ran a close third, receiving 26,036 votes (21.43%).

Trailing were former Speaker of the House Newt Gingrich (16,163 votes, 13.30%), Texas governor Rick Perry (12,557 votes, 10.33%), and Representative Michele Bachmann (6,046 votes, 4.98%). Former Utah governor and ambassador to China Jon Huntsman, Jr., who skipped campaigning in Iowa to focus on the New Hampshire primary, received 739 votes (0.61%).

In total, 121,501 votes were recorded, setting a record for Iowa Republican caucus turnout; this record was broken in the 2016 election by more than 60,000 votes. However, this total was still far less than the all-time Iowa caucus record in the 2008 Democratic Iowa caucuses, in which 239,000 Democrats voted. The 121,501 votes represent 19.8 percent of active registered Republicans in the state and just 5.4 percent of all Iowans eligible to vote.

However, the vote totals of eight precincts were never counted, so the vote totals are not really known.

The secret polling results at Republican caucus sites were unrelated to the delegate selection process in 2012, although that has been changed for the 2016 election cycle.

If the Iowa 2012 Republican caucuses were regarded as the start of the Republican delegate selection process for the 2012 United States presidential election, the real caucus process was the election of Republican delegates to the county conventions, who would eventually determine the delegates at the state convention in June 2012. This would, in turn, determine the Iowa delegates who would attend the Republican National Convention in August, 2012.

This process rewarded campaign organizations that could not only get supporters to the caucus sites, but get supporters who would be willing to serve as delegates to county conventions and beyond. As a result, Ron Paul was ultimately able to win 22 of the 28 delegates to the national convention and Mitt Romney won the other six.

The 2011–2012 pre-caucus poll results for Iowa had highly volatile results; Gallup polls showed the leading candidate in Iowa change seven times from May 2011 until the caucuses. The 2012 caucuses also set a new record for political expenditures, with $12 million being spent, two-thirds of it from "super PACs" which dominated the campaigns by running highly negative attack ads.

In the August 13 Ames Straw Poll, a traditional straw poll held in Iowa Republican caucuses, Bachmann narrowly defeated Paul, with Minnesota governor Tim Pawlenty trailing in third. Following his disappointing showing, Pawlenty dropped out of the race.

Three candidates' debates were held in Iowa over the course the campaign: one on August 11 in Ames ahead of the straw poll; one on December 10, 2011, in Des Moines, and one on December 15 in Sioux City. Several other joint candidates' appearances took place during the caucus campaign outside Iowa.

The day after her unsatisfactory sixth-place performance in Iowa, Bachmann announced she was dropping out of the presidential race. Following his low fifth-place finish, Perry initially announced he was "reassessing" his campaign "to determine whether there is a path forward," but subsequently stated that he would continue on to New Hampshire and South Carolina.

Iowa Republican caucuses, January 3, 2012
Candidate	Votes	Percentage	Projected delegate count		Actual delegates
Candidate	Votes	Percentage	CNN	FOX	Actual delegates
Rick Santorum	29,839	24.56%	7	12	0
Mitt Romney	29,805	24.53%	7	12	6
Ron Paul	26,036	21.43%	7	0	22
Newt Gingrich	16,163	13.30%	2	0	0
Rick Perry	12,557	10.33%	0	0	0
Michele Bachmann	6,046	4.98%	0	0	0
Jon Huntsman	739	0.61%	0	0	0
Herman Cain (write-in)	45	0.04%	0	0	0
Sarah Palin (write-in)	23	0.02%	0	0	0
Buddy Roemer (write-in)	17	0.01%	0	0	0
Fred Karger (write-in)	10	0.01%	0	0	0
Gary Johnson (write-in)	8	0.01%	0	0	0
Donald Trump (write-in)	5	0.00%	0	0	0
Paul Ryan (write-in)	3	0.00%	0	0	0
Rudy Giuliani (write-in)	2	0.00%	0	0	0
Mike Huckabee (write-in)	2	0.00%	0	0	0
Ben Lange (write-in)	2	0.00%	0	0	0
Roy Moore (write-in)	2	0.00%	0	0	0
Tim Pawlenty (write-in)	2	0.00%	0	0	0
Condoleezza Rice (write-in)	2	0.00%	0	0	0
Jared Blankenship (write-in)	1	0.00%	0	0	0
Pat Buchanan (write-in)	1	0.00%	0	0	0
John McCain (write-in)	1	0.00%	0	0	0
Ralph Nader (write-in)	1	0.00%	0	0	0
Robert Ray (write-in)	1	0.00%	0	0	0
Scott Walker (write-in)	1	0.00%	0	0	0
No Preference	147	0.12%	0	0	0
Other	40	0.03%	0	0	0
Unprojected delegates:			5	4	—
Total:	121,501	100.00%	28	28	28

== General election ==
=== Candidates ===
There were eight candidates on the Iowa ballot in the general election: the two major-party candidates (Barack Obama and Mitt Romney) and six minor candidates.

- Barack Obama was the incumbent president and nominee of the Democratic Party. His running mate was Joe Biden, the incumbent vice president.
- Mitt Romney was the nominee of the Republican Party. His running mate was Paul Ryan, a United States Representative from Wisconsin.
- Virgil Goode was the nominee of the Constitution Party. His running mate was James Clymer.
- Jill Stein was the nominee of the Green Party. Her running mate was Cheri Honkala.
- Gary Johnson was the nominee of the Libertarian Party. His running mate was James P. Gray.
- Gloria La Riva appeared on the ballot as a stand-in for Peta Lindsay, the nominee of the Party for Socialism and Liberation, because Lindsay was ineligible to appear on the Iowa ballot due to her young age. Similarly, Stefanie Beacham appeared on the ballot as a stand-in for the party's nominee for vice president, Yari Osorio.
- James Harris was the nominee of the Socialist Workers Party. Alyson Kennedy was listed as Harris's running mate on the Iowa ballot, because the party's vice presidential nominee, Maura DeLuca, was too young to appear on the ballot.
- Jerry Litzel was an independent candidate. Litzel is a collector of presidential memorabilia and "thought it would be neat to collect a (presidential) ballot with my name on it", so he gathered the signatures necessary to appear on the Iowa ballot. His brother, Jim Litzel, is listed as his running mate.

=== Polling ===
Analysts considered Iowa to be a toss-up state—one which either major candidate could plausibly win. A majority of statewide opinion polls had shown Obama tied with or leading Romney. As of October 22, 2012, polling aggregator FiveThirtyEight estimated that there was a 66% likelihood that Obama would win Iowa's electoral votes. Up until September 2012, polling showed a close race with Obama narrowly leading. In late September 2012, Obama gained momentum and this continued through the first three weeks of October 2012, where he won almost every poll in that time period. In October, when Romney gained momentum in other states, Obama won the majority of the polls conducted. Romney ended up winning the second to last poll, but other than that, Obama won every poll in the last week. The final poll showed Obama leading 50% to 48%, while an average of the last 3 polls showed Obama leading 48% to 46%.

=== Predictions ===
Source	Ranking	As of
Huffington Post	Tossup	November 6, 2012
CNN	Tossup	November 6, 2012
New York Times	Tossup	November 6, 2012
Washington Post	Tossup	November 6, 2012
RealClearPolitics	Tossup	November 6, 2012
Sabato's Crystal Ball	Lean D	November 5, 2012
FiveThirtyEight	Likely D	November 6, 2012

=== Results ===
2012 United States presidential election in Iowa
Party	Candidate	Running mate	Votes	Percentage	Electoral votes
Democratic	Barack Obama (incumbent)	Joe Biden (incumbent)	822,544	51.99%	6
Republican	Mitt Romney	Paul Ryan	730,617	46.18%	0
Libertarian	Gary Johnson	Jim Gray	12,926	0.82%	0
Green	Jill Stein	Cheri Honkala	3,769	0.24%	0
Constitution	Virgil Goode	Jim Clymer	3,038	0.19%	0
Independent	Jerry Litzel	Jim Litzel	1,027	0.06%	0
Socialist Workers	James Harris	Alyson Kennedy	445	0.03%	0
Socialism and Liberation	Gloria La Riva	Stefanie Beacham	372	0.02%	0
Others	Others	Write-Ins	7,442	0.53%	0
Totals			1,582,180	100.00%	6

==== By county ====
Obama won 38 counties and Romney won 61 counties. Obama won majorities in terms of the popular vote percentages in 35 counties and won pluralities in terms of the popular vote percentages in 3 counties. Romney won majorites in terms of the popular vote percentages in 57 counties and won pluralities in terms of the popular vote percentages in 4 counties.

County	Barack Obama Democratic		Mitt Romney Republican		Various candidates Other parties		Margin		Total votes cast
County	#	%	#	%	#	%	#	%	Total votes cast
Adair	1,790	44.79%	2,114	52.90%	92	2.31%	-324	-8.11%	3,996
Adams	1,028	47.05%	1,108	50.71%	49	2.24%	-80	-3.66%	2,185
Allamakee	3,553	51.24%	3,264	47.07%	117	1.69%	289	4.17%	6,934
Appanoose	2,951	47.25%	3,161	50.62%	133	2.13%	-210	-3.37%	6,245
Audubon	1,611	46.60%	1,802	52.13%	44	1.27%	-191	-5.53%	3,457
Benton	6,862	48.93%	6,940	49.49%	221	1.58%	-78	-0.56%	14,023
Black Hawk	39,821	59.31%	26,235	39.07%	1,085	1.62%	13,586	20.24%	67,141
Boone	7,512	52.21%	6,556	45.57%	320	2.22%	956	6.64%	14,388
Bremer	6,763	50.67%	6,405	47.99%	178	1.34%	358	2.68%	13,346
Buchanan	5,911	56.11%	4,450	42.24%	174	1.65%	1,461	13.87%	10,535
Buena Vista	3,700	44.14%	4,554	54.32%	129	1.54%	-854	-10.18%	8,383
Butler	3,329	44.12%	4,106	54.42%	110	1.46%	-777	-10.30%	7,545
Calhoun	2,238	42.79%	2,891	55.28%	101	1.93%	-653	-12.49%	5,230
Carroll	4,947	46.35%	5,601	52.47%	126	1.18%	-654	-6.12%	10,674
Cass	2,858	39.67%	4,217	58.53%	130	1.80%	-1,359	-18.86%	7,205
Cedar	4,972	51.53%	4,529	46.94%	148	1.53%	443	4.59%	9,649
Cerro Gordo	13,316	55.89%	10,128	42.51%	380	1.60%	3,188	13.38%	23,824
Cherokee	2,634	41.06%	3,662	57.08%	119	1.86%	-1,028	-16.02%	6,415
Chickasaw	3,554	54.81%	2,836	43.74%	94	1.45%	718	11.07%	6,484
Clarke	2,189	49.41%	2,124	47.95%	117	2.64%	65	1.46%	4,430
Clay	3,385	39.81%	4,951	58.23%	166	1.96%	-1,566	-18.42%	8,502
Clayton	4,806	52.59%	4,164	45.57%	168	1.84%	642	7.02%	9,138
Clinton	15,141	60.56%	9,432	37.73%	427	1.71%	5,709	22.83%	25,000
Crawford	3,066	45.41%	3,595	53.24%	91	1.35%	-529	-7.83%	6,752
Dallas	16,576	43.49%	20,988	55.06%	552	1.45%	-4,412	-11.57%	38,116
Davis	1,520	40.29%	2,138	56.67%	115	3.04%	-618	-16.38%	3,773
Decatur	1,791	46.73%	1,947	50.80%	95	2.47%	-156	-4.07%	3,833
Delaware	4,616	49.22%	4,636	49.43%	126	1.35%	-20	-0.21%	9,378
Des Moines	11,888	58.32%	8,136	39.91%	361	1.77%	3,752	18.41%	20,385
Dickinson	4,095	40.31%	5,912	58.19%	152	1.50%	-1,817	-17.88%	10,159
Dubuque	28,768	56.53%	21,280	41.81%	846	1.66%	7,488	14.72%	50,894
Emmet	2,099	44.78%	2,507	53.49%	81	1.73%	-408	-8.71%	4,687
Fayette	5,732	55.30%	4,492	43.33%	142	1.37%	1,240	11.97%	10,366
Floyd	4,680	56.68%	3,472	42.05%	105	1.27%	1,208	14.63%	8,257
Franklin	2,266	43.69%	2,823	54.44%	97	1.87%	-557	-10.75%	5,186
Fremont	1,637	44.63%	1,972	53.76%	59	1.61%	-335	-9.13%	3,668
Greene	2,375	49.01%	2,380	49.11%	91	1.88%	-5	-0.10%	4,846
Grundy	2,635	37.85%	4,215	60.54%	112	1.61%	-1,580	-22.69%	6,962
Guthrie	2,569	43.63%	3,171	53.86%	148	2.51%	-602	-10.23%	5,888
Hamilton	3,782	47.71%	3,991	50.35%	154	1.94%	-209	-2.64%	7,927
Hancock	2,521	42.55%	3,317	55.98%	87	1.47%	-796	-13.43%	5,925
Hardin	4,075	45.80%	4,670	52.48%	153	1.72%	-595	-6.68%	8,898
Harrison	3,136	42.83%	4,065	55.52%	121	1.65%	-929	-12.69%	7,322
Henry	4,460	45.99%	5,035	51.92%	202	2.09%	-575	-5.93%	9,697
Howard	2,768	59.59%	1,795	38.64%	82	1.77%	973	20.95%	4,645
Humboldt	1,972	38.23%	3,099	60.08%	87	1.69%	-1,127	-21.85%	5,158
Ida	1,321	36.06%	2,286	62.41%	56	1.53%	-965	-26.35%	3,663
Iowa	4,144	46.74%	4,569	51.53%	153	1.73%	-425	-4.79%	8,866
Jackson	5,907	57.67%	4,177	40.78%	158	1.55%	1,730	16.89%	10,242
Jasper	10,257	52.56%	8,877	45.49%	381	1.95%	1,380	7.07%	19,515
Jefferson	4,798	56.25%	3,436	40.28%	296	3.47%	1,362	15.97%	8,530
Johnson	50,666	66.69%	23,698	31.19%	1,613	2.12%	26,968	35.50%	75,977
Jones	5,534	52.96%	4,721	45.18%	194	1.86%	813	7.78%	10,449
Keokuk	2,303	43.73%	2,843	53.99%	120	2.28%	-540	-10.26%	5,266
Kossuth	3,850	43.15%	4,937	55.33%	136	1.52%	-1,087	-12.18%	8,923
Lee	10,714	56.65%	7,785	41.17%	412	2.18%	2,929	15.48%	18,911
Linn	68,581	57.90%	47,622	40.20%	2,250	1.90%	20,959	17.70%	118,453
Louisa	2,452	49.36%	2,420	48.71%	96	1.93%	32	0.65%	4,968
Lucas	1,987	45.96%	2,254	52.14%	82	1.90%	-267	-6.18%	4,323
Lyon	1,423	21.86%	4,978	76.48%	108	1.66%	-3,555	-54.62%	6,509
Madison	3,630	42.92%	4,638	54.84%	190	2.24%	-1,008	-11.92%	8,458
Mahaska	4,213	38.71%	6,448	59.25%	222	2.04%	-2,235	-20.54%	10,883
Marion	7,507	42.44%	9,828	55.57%	352	1.99%	-2,321	-13.13%	17,687
Marshall	10,257	53.80%	8,472	44.44%	335	1.76%	1,785	9.36%	19,064
Mills	2,848	39.49%	4,216	58.46%	148	2.05%	-1,368	-18.97%	7,212
Mitchell	2,831	50.68%	2,643	47.31%	112	2.01%	188	3.37%	5,586
Monona	2,101	44.31%	2,557	53.92%	84	1.77%	-456	-9.61%	4,742
Monroe	1,731	45.20%	2,026	52.90%	73	1.90%	-295	-7.70%	3,830
Montgomery	1,922	38.25%	3,001	59.72%	102	2.03%	-1,079	-21.47%	5,025
Muscatine	11,323	57.00%	8,168	41.12%	374	1.88%	3,155	15.88%	19,865
O'Brien	1,969	26.82%	5,266	71.73%	106	1.45%	-3,297	-44.91%	7,341
Osceola	912	28.55%	2,230	69.82%	52	1.63%	-1,318	-41.27%	3,194
Page	2,613	36.91%	4,348	61.42%	118	1.67%	-1,735	-24.51%	7,079
Palo Alto	2,139	43.77%	2,660	54.43%	88	1.80%	-521	-10.66%	4,887
Plymouth	4,164	32.15%	8,597	66.39%	189	1.46%	-4,433	-34.24%	12,950
Pocahontas	1,523	37.77%	2,396	59.42%	113	2.81%	-873	-21.65%	4,032
Polk	128,465	56.13%	96,096	41.98%	4,321	1.89%	32,369	14.15%	228,882
Pottawattamie	19,644	46.44%	21,860	51.68%	797	1.88%	-2,216	-5.24%	42,301
Poweshiek	5,357	53.70%	4,424	44.35%	194	1.95%	933	9.35%	9,975
Ringgold	1,186	45.63%	1,368	52.64%	45	1.73%	-182	-7.01%	2,599
Sac	2,122	40.11%	3,094	58.48%	75	1.41%	-972	-18.37%	5,291
Scott	50,652	56.12%	38,251	42.38%	1,360	1.50%	12,401	13.74%	90,263
Shelby	2,469	38.08%	3,911	60.33%	103	1.59%	-1,442	-22.25%	6,483
Sioux	2,700	15.60%	14,407	83.24%	201	1.16%	-11,707	-67.64%	17,308
Story	26,192	55.55%	19,668	41.71%	1,290	2.74%	6,524	13.84%	47,150
Tama	4,768	52.88%	4,098	45.45%	151	1.67%	670	7.43%	9,017
Taylor	1,262	42.14%	1,683	56.19%	50	1.67%	-421	-14.05%	2,995
Union	3,043	51.08%	2,813	47.22%	101	1.70%	230	3.86%	5,957
Van Buren	1,402	39.28%	2,064	57.83%	103	2.89%	-662	-18.55%	3,569
Wapello	8,663	54.93%	6,789	43.05%	318	2.02%	1,874	11.88%	15,770
Warren	12,551	48.14%	13,052	50.06%	469	1.80%	-501	-1.92%	26,072
Washington	5,115	46.48%	5,562	50.55%	327	2.97%	-447	-4.07%	11,004
Wayne	1,251	43.14%	1,583	54.59%	66	2.27%	-332	-11.45%	2,900
Webster	9,537	52.14%	8,469	46.30%	286	1.56%	1,068	5.84%	18,292
Winnebago	2,903	49.05%	2,906	49.10%	109	1.85%	-3	-0.05%	5,918
Winneshiek	6,256	56.44%	4,622	41.70%	206	1.86%	1,634	14.74%	11,084
Woodbury	22,302	49.54%	21,841	48.52%	876	1.94%	461	1.02%	45,019
Worth	2,350	56.33%	1,744	41.80%	78	1.87%	606	14.53%	4,172
Wright	2,836	45.17%	3,349	53.35%	93	1.48%	-513	-8.18%	6,278
Total	822,544	51.99%	730,617	46.18%	29,019	1.83%	91,927	5.81%	1,582,180

Counties that flipped from Democratic to Republican

- Adams (largest city: Corning)
- Audubon (largest city: Audubon)
- Benton (largest city: Vinton)
- Carroll (largest city: Carroll)
- Crawford (largest city: Denison)
- Delaware (largest city: Manchester)
- Emmet (largest city: Estherville)
- Franklin (largest city: Hampton)
- Greene (largest city: Jefferson)
- Hamilton (largest city: Webster City)
- Hardin (largest city: Iowa Falls)
- Iowa (largest city: Williamsburg)
- Kossuth (largest city: Algona)
- Palo Alto (largest city: Emmetsburg)
- Warren (largest city: Indianola)
- Winnebago (largest city: Forest City)

Counties that flipped from Republican to Democratic

- Woodbury (largest city: Sioux City)

==== By congressional district ====
Obama won three of four congressional districts, including one held by a Republican.

District	Romney	Obama	Representative
1st	42.53%	56.2%	Bruce Braley
2nd	42.74%	55.78%	Dave Loebsack
3rd	47.16%	51.45%	Tom Latham
4th	53.42%	45.26%	Steve King

== See also ==
- United States presidential elections in Iowa
- Iowa Democratic Party
- Iowa Republican Party
