= Bill Northey =

American politician (1959–2024)

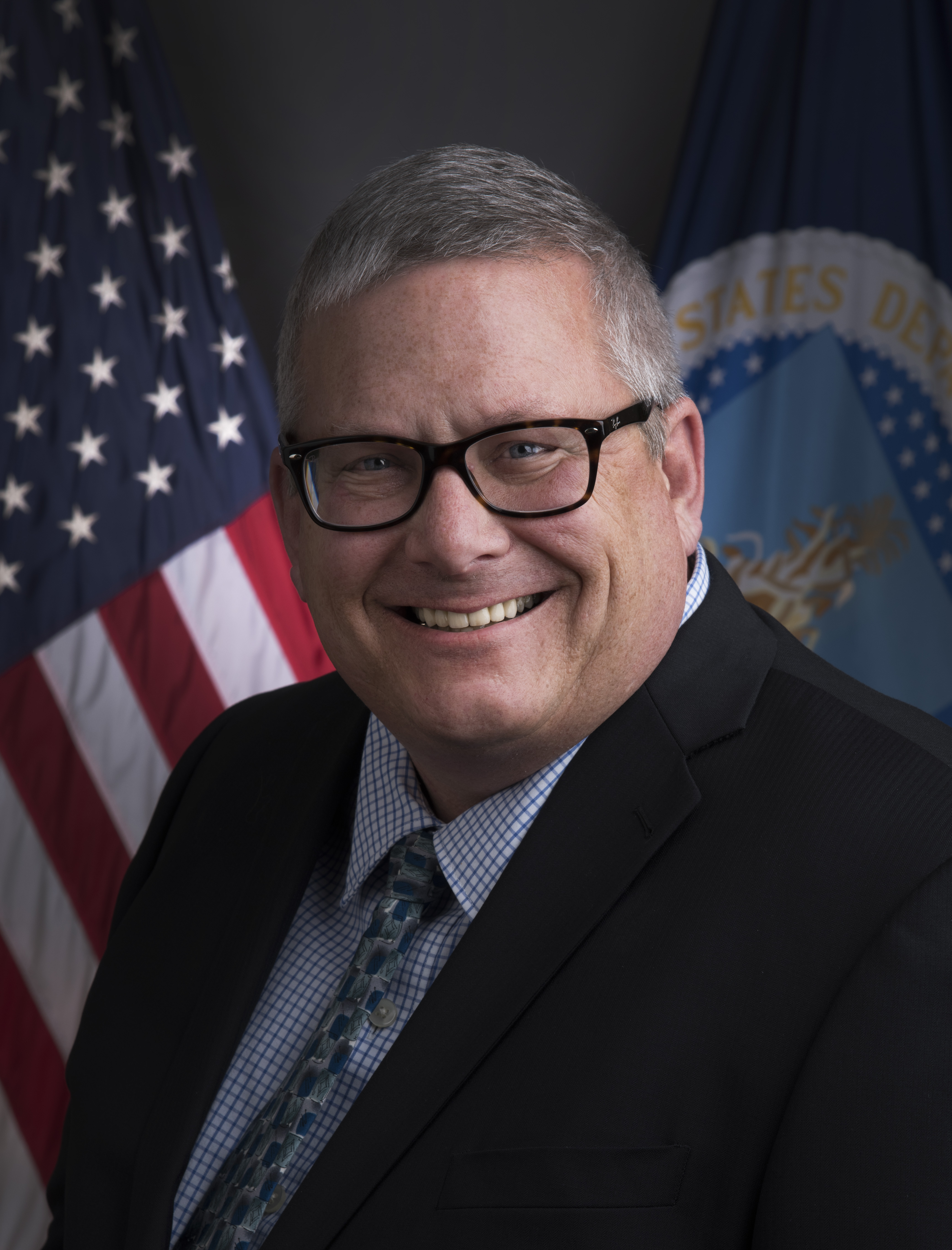
- Official portrait, 2018

Under Secretary of Agriculture for Farm and Foreign Agricultural Services
- In office March 6, 2018 – January 20, 2021
- President: Donald Trump
- Preceded by: Michael Scuse
- Succeeded by: Robert Bonnie

14th Secretary of Agriculture of Iowa
- In office January 2, 2007 – March 5, 2018
- Governor: Chet Culver; Terry Branstad; Kim Reynolds
- Preceded by: Patty Judge
- Succeeded by: Mike Naig

Personal details
- Born: William Howard Northey; May 27, 1959 Spirit Lake, Iowa, U.S.
- Died: February 5, 2024 (aged 64) West Des Moines, Iowa, U.S.
- Party: Republican
- Spouse: Cindy Northey
- Children: 3
- Education: Iowa State University (BS); Southwest Minnesota State University (MBA)

William Howard Northey (May 27, 1959 – February 5, 2024) was an American politician who served as the Under Secretary for Farm Production and Conservation in the United States Department of Agriculture from 2018 to 2021. A member of the Republican Party, he previously served as the Secretary of Agriculture of Iowa, first elected on November 7, 2006, and sworn in on January 2, 2007. In that position he led the Iowa Department of Agriculture and Land Stewardship.

== Education and family ==
Northey graduated from Iowa State University with an undergraduate degree in agricultural business in 1981 and was a member of the FarmHouse fraternity, serving as its president during his senior year. Northey received a Master in Business Administration degree from Southwest Minnesota State University in 2004.

Northey and his wife, Cindy, had three daughters. Northey died in February 2024 at the age of 64 in West Des Moines.

== Career in agriculture ==
Northey was active in agriculture groups at the county, state, and national levels. From 1995 to 1996, Northey served as president of the National Corn Growers Association and was chairman of the group in 1996 and 1997. He also led a number of committees for the Corn Growers. Northey was named a "Friend of Agriculture" by the Iowa Farm Bureau Political Action Committee in 2006 and served in a number of Farm Bureau offices at the county and state level, including serving as president, vice president, and committee chairman of the Dickinson County Farm Bureau.

Northey also served on the Iowa USDA Farm Service Agency State Committee, was a Dickinson County Soil and Water Conservation District Commissioner, and was a board member of Ag Ventures Alliance.

Northey was co-founder and president of Innovative Growers, LLC, which is an organization hatched from ISU Extension Leadership. Innovative Growers is a farmer-owned and farmer-managed group designed to capitalize on demand for the production of specialty grain products. On his farm, Northey employed the farming practices of reduced tillage, GPS, grid soil sampling and identity preserved production. He raised crops of corn and soybeans.

== Iowa Secretary of Agriculture ==
Northey ran for Secretary of Agriculture on a platform of expanding opportunities in renewable energy, promoting conservation and stewardship, and telling the story of Iowa agriculture. He ran against Democrat Denise O'Brien. He won the election 50% to 48%. In 2010, he was re-elected by a margin of 60% to 35% against Democrat Francis Thicke. In 2014, Northey won re-election with over 62% of the vote.

== Under Secretary of Agriculture for Farm and Foreign Agricultural Services ==
In September 2017, Northey was nominated to be Under Secretary of Agriculture for Farm Production and Conservation by President Donald Trump. After a hold by Senator Ted Cruz was lifted on February 27, 2018, Northey was confirmed by the Senate.

As part of a reorganization of the USDA, Secretary of Agriculture Sonny Perdue created a new Under Secretary for Trade and Foreign Agricultural Affairs, as directed by the 2014 Farm Bill. The creation of the new mission area prompted the realignment of several agencies under a newly named Under Secretary for Farm Production and Conservation (FPAC), the position which Northey held until 2021. FPAC encompasses the USDA's domestic-facing agencies: the Farm Service Agency, the Natural Resources Conservation Service, and the Risk Management Agency.

== Electoral history ==
Iowa Secretary of Agriculture Republican primary election, 2006
Party	Candidate	Votes	%
Republican	Bill Northey	32,911	46.75
Republican	Mark Leonard	28,315	40.22
Republican	Karey Claghorn	9,089	12.91

Iowa Secretary of Agriculture election, 2006
Party	Candidate	Votes	%
Republican	Bill Northey	523,539	50.23
Democratic	Denise O'Brien	495,873	47.57

Iowa Secretary of Agriculture election, 2010
Party	Candidate	Votes	%
Republican	Bill Northey (incumbent)	674,572	59.52
Democratic	Francis Thicke	398,428	35.15
Write-ins	Write-ins	849	0.07

Iowa Secretary of Agriculture election, 2014
Party	Candidate	Votes	%
Republican	Bill Northey (incumbent)	675,781	59.17
Democratic	Sherrie Taha	370,209	32.41
New Independent	Levi Benning	39,349	3.45
Write-ins	Write-ins	891	0.08

Party political offices
Preceded by John Askew	Republican nominee for Secretary of Agriculture of Iowa; 2006, 2010, 2014	Succeeded by Mike Naig
Political offices
Preceded by Patty Judge	Secretary of Agriculture of Iowa; 2007–2018	Succeeded by Mike Naig
Preceded by Michael Scuse	Under Secretary of Agriculture for Farm and Foreign Agricultural Services; 2018–2021	Succeeded by Robert Bonnie
