= Charles J. O'Mara =

American businessman (1943–2019)

Charles J. "Joe" O'Mara (5 November 1943 – 27 April 2019) was president of O'Mara and Associates, a consulting firm. He was a member of the Agricultural Policy Advisory Committee to the Secretary of Agriculture.

From 1990 to 1995 O'Mara served as counsel for international affairs to the U.S. Secretary of Agriculture and Special Negotiator for Agriculture to the United States Trade Representative. O'Mara was a Senior Foreign Service Officer with the Foreign Agricultural Service, and his overseas tours included duty in Buenos Aires, São Paulo, and Geneva. O'Mara also served as acting Under Secretary of Agriculture for Farm and Foreign Agricultural Services during the first six months of the Clinton administration.

== Oral History ==
The Association for Diplomatic Studies and Training Foreign Affairs Oral History Project CHARLES J. O'MARA 8 December 2017

== See also ==
Chief Agricultural Negotiator
