= Robert Paarlberg =

Robert L. Paarlberg is a professor at Wellesley College and Associate at the Weatherhead Center for International Affairs at Harvard University. He is the author of several books and numerous articles.

His research focuses on the international agricultural and environmental policy, regulation of modern technology, including biotechnology.

He graduated from Carleton College (BA) and Harvard University (PhD).

== Selected works ==
- Resetting the Table: Straight Talk About the Food We Grow and Eat, Knopf
- Fixing Farm Trade, Council on Foreign Relation
- Food Trade and Foreign Policy, Cornell University Press
- Countrysides at Risk, Overseas Development Council
- Leadership Abroad Begins at Home, Brookings
- Policy Reform in American Agriculture, Chicago University Press (with David Orden and Terry Roe)
- The Politics of Precaution, Johns Hopkins
- Starved for Science: How Biotechnology Is Being Kept Out of Africa, Harvard University Press (March 2008)
- Food Politics: What Everyone Needs to Know
- The United States of Excess, Gluttony and the Dark Side of American Exceptionalism, Oxford University Press (April 2015)

== Personal life ==
Robert Paarlberg is the son of academic and public servant Don Paarlberg. He graduated from Carleton College in 1967 with a degree in government.
