= Don Paarlberg =

American farmer, professor, and author (1911–2006)

Donald Paarlberg (June 20, 1911 – February 14, 2006) was a farmer, author, professor of agricultural economics, and a coordinator of the Food for Peace program.

== Education ==
Paarlberg was born in Oak Glen, Illinois. He received his bachelor of science degree from Purdue University in 1940, his master of science degree from Cornell University in 1942, and his Ph.D. from Cornell University in 1947. He was a professor of agricultural economics at Purdue University from 1946-1952, and from 1961-1969.

== Government career ==
Paarlberg entered government service in 1953. During the Eisenhower Administration he was the economic advisor to the Secretary of Agriculture, Ezra Taft Benson, in the first Republican-managed U.S. Department of Agriculture in more than twenty years. In 1957 Paarlberg became the Assistant Secretary of Agriculture for Marketing and Foreign Agriculture and in late 1958 he was chosen by President Eisenhower to succeed the retiring Gabriel Hauge as Special Assistant to the President for Economic Affairs. Early in 1960 President Eisenhower added the responsibility of coordinator of the newly created Food for Peace program to Paarlberg’s duties. Paarlberg served in this dual capacity until the end of the Eisenhower Administration, at which time he returned to Purdue University as Professor Emeritus.

== Books ==
- Food, co-authored with F.A. Pearson
- American Farm Policy (1964)
- Great Myths of Economics (1968)
- An Analysis and History of Inflation (1992) ISBN 0275944166
- The Agricultural Revolution of the 20th Century, co-authored with nephew (2001) Philip Paarlberg ISBN 0813804094
- [at least five other books]

== Personal life ==
Paarlberg married Eva Robertson in 1940. One of their two sons was his occasional co-author, Robert Paarlberg. Mrs. Paarlberg died in 1997.
