= Michael Scuse =

American government official

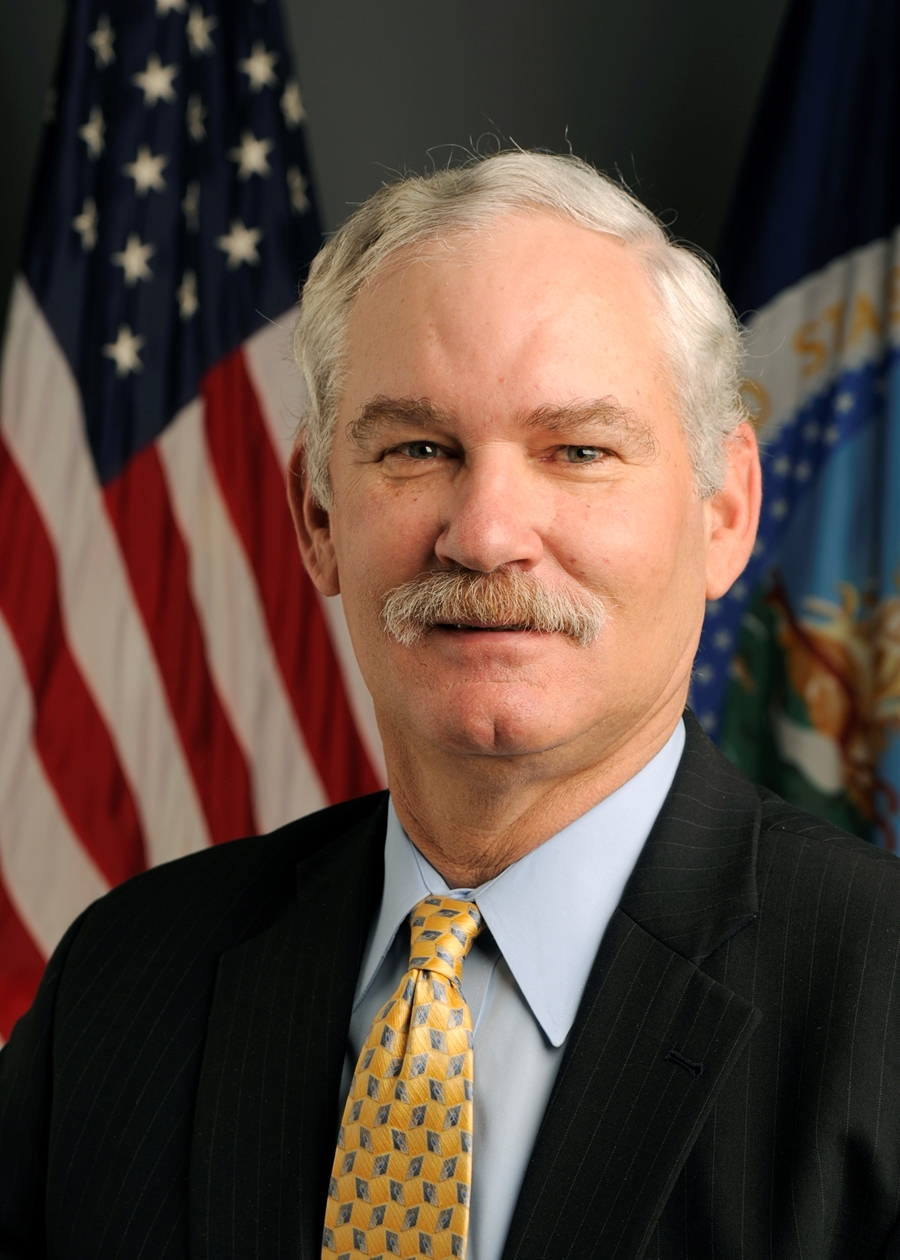

Delaware Secretary of Agriculture
- In office January 25, 2017 – January 2025
- Governor: John Carney
- In office May 2001 – September 2008
- Governor: Ruth Ann Minner

Acting United States Secretary of Agriculture
- In office January 13, 2017 – January 20, 2017
- President: Barack Obama
- Preceded by: Tom Vilsack
- Succeeded by: Mike Young (acting)

Acting United States Deputy Secretary of Agriculture
- In office March 1, 2016 – January 20, 2017
- President: Barack Obama
- Preceded by: Krysta Harden
- Succeeded by: Mike Young (acting)

Under Secretary of Agriculture for Farm and Foreign Agricultural Services
- In office May 14, 2012 – January 20, 2017
- President: Barack Obama
- Preceded by: James W. Miller
- Succeeded by: Bill Northey

Personal details
- Born: 1954 (age 71–72)
- Party: Democratic
- Spouse: Patrice Scuse

Michael T. Scuse (born 1954) is an American government official serving as the Delaware Secretary of Agriculture. Scuse previously served as the acting United States deputy secretary of agriculture and United States secretary of agriculture in the Obama administration.

== Career ==
Prior to joining the United States Department of Agriculture, Scuse served as Secretary of the Delaware Department of Agriculture from May 2001 until September 2008, when he resigned to become Chief of Staff to Governor of Delaware Ruth Ann Minner.

From 2016 to 2017, Scuse served as the United States Deputy Secretary of Agriculture. Following the resignation of Tom Vilsack on January 13, 2017, he served as acting United States Secretary of Agriculture until Donald Trump took office as president. He also served as Under Secretary of Agriculture for Farm and Foreign Agricultural Services from 2012 to 2017.

He was re-appointed as Secretary of the Delaware Department of Agriculture by Governor-elect John Carney in January 2017.

== Personal life ==
Scuse and his wife Patrice own a farm in Smyrna, Delaware.

Political offices
Preceded by James W. Miller	Under Secretary of Agriculture for Farm and Foreign Agricultural Services; 2012–2017	Succeeded by Bill Northey
Preceded by Krysta Harden	United States Deputy Secretary of Agriculture; Acting; 2016–2017	Succeeded by Mike Young; Acting
Preceded by Tom Vilsack	United States Secretary of Agriculture; Acting; 2017	Succeeded by Mike Young; Acting
