= David Vetter (farmer) =

Organic farmer and leader in the sustainable agriculture movement

David Vetter is an organic farmer and leader in the sustainable agriculture movement.

== Early life and education ==
David Vetter grew up on his family's farm in Marquette, Nebraska. In 1953, his father Donald Vetter decided to stop spraying pesticides on his fields. He questioned the chemical's real value in farming. He found that they did not give him much higher returns, while he believed they caused significant harm to the soil and killed wildlife. He was considered strange by his neighbors for his beliefs and farming practices.

Vetter received a BS in Soil Science/Agronomy from the University of Nebraska–Lincoln, and a Master of Divinity from the United Theological Seminary.

While he was in the seminary, he met Fred Kirschenmann. He introduced Kirschenmann to the science of organic farming, inspiring Kirschenmann to return to farming himself.

== Career ==
After completing his education, Vetter returned to his family's farm in 1975. The farm was certified organic in 1978.

Vetter realized that he needed to help build a processing infrastructure and a marketing program in order to sell and distribute his products to the consumer. In 1980, David and his father Don, invested $170,000 to build a small grain-cleaning plant. David and his father Don established Grain Place Foods in 1987 to provide a place for other organic farmers to go and get their grain cleaned and marketed.

Vetter is a founding member of the Nebraska Sustainable Agriculture Society. He also chaired the first Organic Crop Improvement Association's International Certification Committee.

The Vetter family started the Grain Place Foundation after Donald Vetter's death in 2015.

As of 2019, the farm employs 2 hands-on farmers with Dave handling the overall management. Grain Place Foods employs approximately 20 full time employees and Dave is the CEO. As of 2020, the family grows a variety of crops on a 9-year rotation.

== Film ==
Vetter and his family were featured in the 2018 documentary film Dreaming of a Vetter World. The film tells the Vetter family story and how management of soil is critical to sustainable agriculture and even in combating climate change. The film was entirely shot, directed and narrated by the director Bonnie Hawthorne, who lived on the Vetter farm during filming. Jo Andres, Steve Buscemi, and Robert Houston were executive producers.

== Awards and honors ==
In 2016, the Rodale Institute named him an "Organic Pioneer" and he received the Organic Leadership Award from the Organic Trade Association. He was named as the Rodale Institute's 2016 Farmer of the Year. In 2011, David and his family were named Organic Farmers of the Year by the Midwest Organic Sustainable Education Service (MOSES).

== Personal life ==
Vetter is married to Rogean. Together they have three children: Allison, Darci, and Madison.
