= Chief Agricultural Negotiator =

Chief Agricultural Negotiator of Office of the United States Trade Representative
- Incumbent; Julie Callahan since December 30, 2025
- Type: Ambassador
- Nominator: President of the United States
- Formation: 1934
- Salary: Level III of the Executive Schedule

The Chief Agricultural Negotiator is an ambassador of the Office of the United States Trade Representative (USTR) responsible for conducting and overseeing international negotiations related to trade in agricultural products. The Chief Agricultural Negotiator is compensated at the rate payable for Level III of the Executive Schedule.

== Predecessor positions ==
The position has its origins in the Reciprocal Trade Agreements Act of 1934, which stipulated that the Secretary of Agriculture must be consulted when the Department of State conducted negotiations on agricultural trade. At that time the head of Foreign Agricultural Service (FAS) of the United States Department of Agriculture, Leslie A. Wheeler, began to lead agricultural negotiations. His successors as heads of the Office of Foreign Agricultural Relations and the Foreign Agricultural Service continued this work until creation of the Office of the United States Trade Representative in 1962.

Initially, USTR's agricultural negotiations were closely coordinated with the Administrator of the Foreign Agricultural Service, and in fact during the Kennedy Round of GATT negotiations FAS Administrator Raymond A. Ioanes served as the principal agricultural negotiator. By the late 1970s, however, such matters were handled by an Assistant United States Trade Representative for Agricultural Affairs and Commodity Policy who, after 1978, was a career member of the Senior Executive Service. Over time, this position evolved into a politically appointed "Special Trade Negotiator for Agricultural and Food Policy" who did not hold ambassadorial rank.

During negotiation of the Uruguay Round of GATT talks that led ultimately to creation of the World Trade Organization, Charles J. O'Mara, a Senior Foreign Service officer of the Foreign Agricultural Service, was appointed Counsel for International Affairs to the U.S. Secretary of Agriculture and Special Trade Negotiator for Agriculture. According to Congressional testimony,

In January 1990, U.S. Trade Representative Carla Hills and former Secretary of Agriculture Clayton Yeutter appointed Mr. O'Mara as their negotiator for agriculture in the Uruguay Round of multilateral trade negotiations. In August 1991, he was named Special Trade Negotiator in the Department's International Affairs and Commodity Programs Office, where he has maintained his responsibilities for the Uruguay Round and spearheaded negotiations on agriculture in the North American Free Trade Agreement (NAFTA).

Though not employed by USTR, O'Mara thus effectively functioned as USTR's lead agricultural negotiator from 1990 until conclusion of the Uruguay Round.

== Officeholders ==
In 1997, Peter L. Scher was nominated and confirmed to the rank of ambassador while serving as Special Trade Negotiator for Agriculture, the first time the position was elevated to that status. The Chief Agricultural Negotiator ambassadorship was formally created by the Trade and Development Act of 2000 while Scher was in the position, making him the first to bear the title. However, according to Senate records, the first formal nominee to the new ambassadorship was Scher's successor, Gregory M. Frazier, who was nominated to it October 19, 2000. Frazier was not confirmed by the Senate and was elevated to the ambassadorship from his position as Special Negotiator for Agriculture and Food Policy in a recess appointment on December 21, 2000. He was succeeded in turn by Allen F. Johnson and Dr. Richard T. Crowder. In March 2008, President George W. Bush nominated A. Ellen Terpstra to the post, but she was not confirmed.

Islam A. Siddiqui was given a recess appointment in March 2010, and confirmed by the Senate on October 20, 2011. Dr. Siddiqui submitted his resignation December 12, 2013.

On December 17, 2013, President Barack Obama nominated Darci Vetter to succeed Dr. Siddiqui. She was confirmed to that position by voice vote on July 9, 2014. A Democrat, Vetter resigned from the position with the change of presidential administrations on January 20, 2017.

The U.S. Senate confirmed Gregg Doud to succeed Darci Vetter on March 1, 2018. He served until the end of the Trump administration.

In 2022, President Joe Biden nominated Doug McKalip to the position, after his 2021 nomination of Elaine Trevino was withdrawn. McKalip was confirmed by the Senate in December 2022, and he was sworn in on January 9, 2023.
