= Robert Bonnie =

American government official

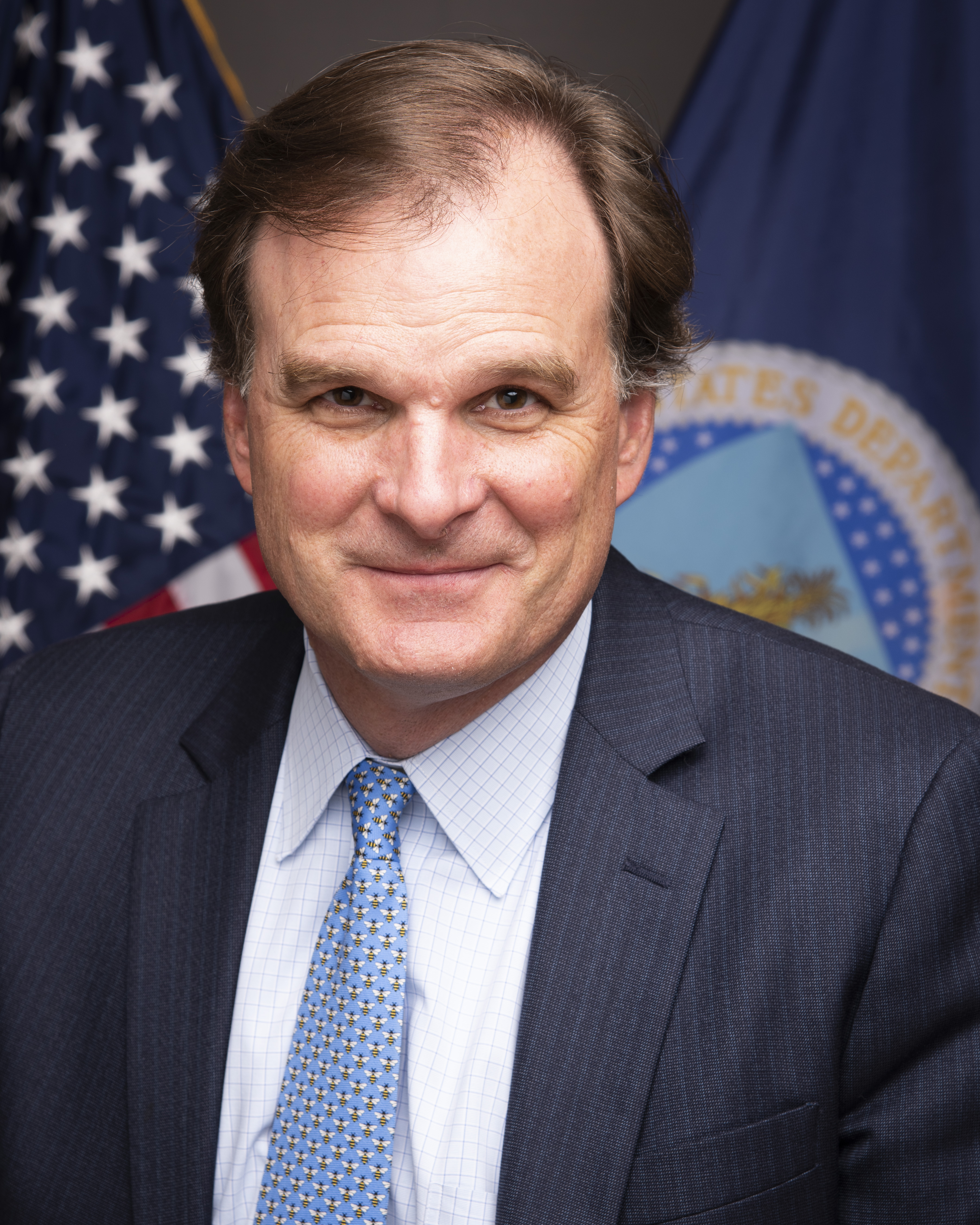

Under Secretary of Agriculture for Farm and Foreign Agricultural Services
- In office November 19, 2021 – January 20, 2025
- President: Joe Biden
- Secretary: Tom Vilsack
- Preceded by: Bill Northey
- Succeeded by: Richard Fordyce

Robert Farrell Bonnie is an American government official who served as Under Secretary of Agriculture for Farm Production and Conservation from 2021 to 2025. He previously served as Deputy Chief of Staff for Policy and Senior Advisor, Climate, in the Office of the Secretary in the United States Department of Agriculture. He was appointed on January 20, 2021.

In November 2020, Bonnie was selected by the Biden presidential transition team to lead an initiative concerning climate change.

During the Obama administration, he was Under Secretary of Agriculture for Natural Resources and Environment at the United States Department of Agriculture and as a Senior Advisor to Secretary Tom Vilsack for climate and the environment at the United States Department of Agriculture. He worked at the Environmental Defense Fund for 14 years. Bonnie holds a master’s degree in forestry and environmental management from Duke University, and a bachelor’s from Harvard College.

On April 16, 2021, Bonnie was nominated by President Joe Biden to be the Under Secretary of Agriculture for Farm Production and Conservation. Bonnie's confirmation hearing was held on July 29, 2021, and favorably reported by the Senate's Agriculture Committee on August 10, 2021. He was confirmed by the entire Senate by a vote of 76-19 on November 16, 2021. Bonnie started at his new position on November 19, 2021.
