= Gregg Doud =

American economist and government official

Gregory Doud
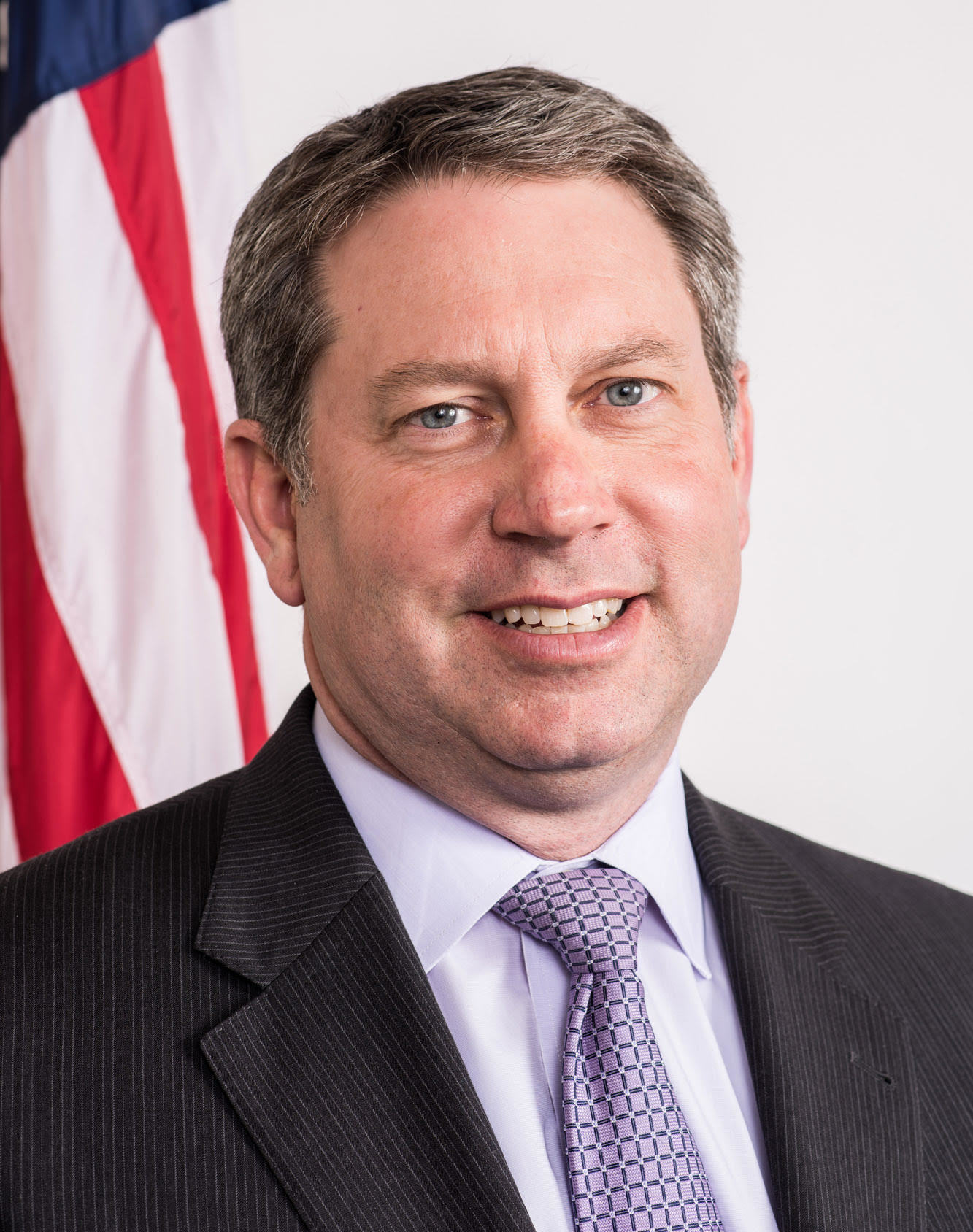

United States Chief Agricultural Negotiator
- In office March 12, 2018 – January 20, 2021
- President: Donald Trump
- Preceded by: Darci Vetter
- Succeeded by: Doug McKalip

Personal details
- Born: Mankato, Kansas, U.S.
- Party: Republican
- Education: Kansas State University (BS, MS)

Gregory Doud is an American economist and government official who served as the Chief Agricultural Negotiator in the Office of the United States Trade Representative (USTR) during the Trump Administration. Doud previously served as the president of the Commodity Markets Council. He also served as a staff member for the United States Senate Committee on Agriculture, Nutrition and Forestry and as chief economist for the National Cattlemen's Beef Association.

== Early life and education ==
A native of Mankato, Kansas, Doud earned a Bachelor of Science degree in animal science and a Master of Science in agricultural economics from Kansas State University.

Growing up, Doud was involved in 4-H and served on the Kansas State FFA officer team from 1986 to 1987. He was also involved in the Alpha Gamma Rho fraternity at Kansas State University.

== Career ==
Doud was the chief economist for the National Cattlemen's Beef Association for eight years. He then joined the United States Senate Committee on Agriculture, Nutrition and Forestry, working under U.S. Senators Pat Roberts and Thad Cochran. In this position, he helped to draft the 2012 United States farm bill and worked on policy issues related to livestock, international trade, food aid, and oversight of the Commodity Futures Trading Commission.

Doud became president of the Commodity Markets Council in 2013. He served in that role until March 2018, when he was confirmed by the U.S. Senate to become the Chief Agricultural Negotiator in the Office of the United States Trade Representative.

== Awards ==
In 2012, Doud was awarded the Outstanding Young Alumnus of the Kansas State University Agriculture Alumni Association and also received the Outstanding Alumnus award from the Department of Agricultural Economics at Kansas State in 2017.
