= Trade Policy Committee =

US government interagency trade committee

The Trade Policy Committee (TPC) is the senior U.S. Government interagency trade committee established to provide broad guidance on trade issues. It is chaired by the U.S. Trade Representative (USTR) and is composed of other cabinet officers, including the Secretary of Agriculture. The Trade Policy Review Group (TPRG) that reports to the TPC is chaired by the Deputy USTR and is composed of sub-cabinet representatives, including the Under Secretary of Agriculture for Farm and Foreign Agricultural Services. The Trade Policy Staff Committee, the level at which position papers are initiated, is chaired by a Deputy Assistant USTR and has representation from other cabinet departments including USDA.

Because our CGE model focuses primarily on trade policy, we have included eight trade sectors: Main current and potential trading partners: EU, former CIS countries (Russia, Georgia and Azerbaijan), Russia, Georgia, Iran, Turkey, Azerbaijan and other countries (TRAOTH). This trade department is used to highlight changes in Armenia's trade with its neighbors and significant trade changes. Information on flows between Armenia The rest of the world comes from various sources such as ARMSTAT and IFS, but Areas that require serious expert judgment.

== See also ==
- Commercial policy
