= Mike Young (agriculture official) =

American government official

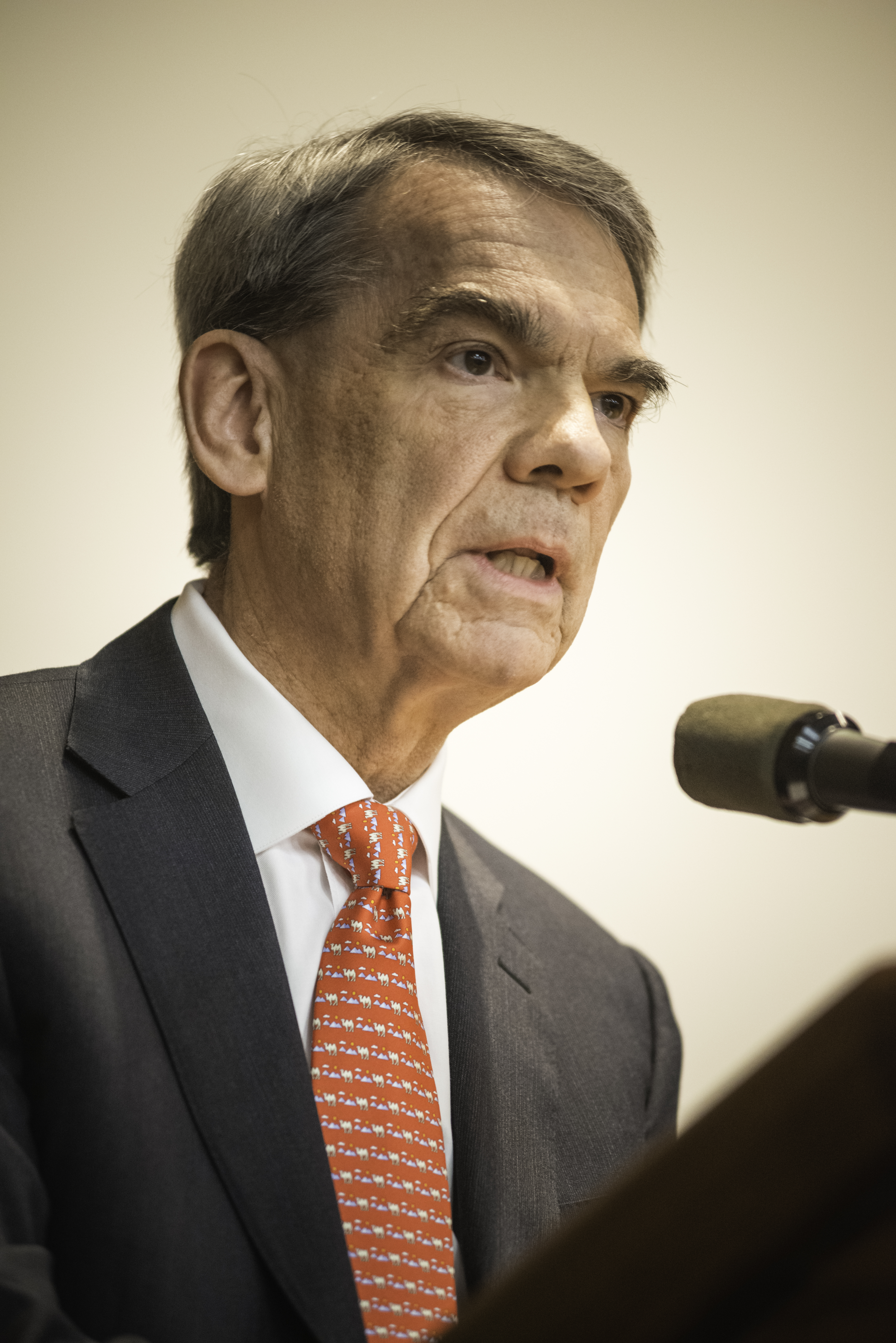

Acting United States Secretary of Agriculture
- In office January 20, 2017 – April 25, 2017
- President: Donald Trump
- Preceded by: Michael Scuse (acting)
- Succeeded by: Sonny Perdue

Acting United States Deputy Secretary of Agriculture
- In office January 20, 2017 – October 10, 2017
- President: Donald Trump
- Preceded by: Michael Scuse (acting)
- Succeeded by: Stephen Censky

Personal details
- Education: Colorado State University (BS); George Washington University (MBA)

Michael L. Young is an American government official. He served as the acting United States secretary of agriculture from January 20, 2017, when Donald Trump took office as president of the United States, to April 25, 2017, when the United States Senate confirmed Sonny Perdue as the new secretary. Young has been director of the United States Department of Agriculture (USDA) Office of Budget and Policy Analysis since October 2010, and has served for 25 years in that office, and has previously served in other positions within the department. He has a bachelor of science degree in botany from Colorado State University and a master of business administration degree from George Washington University.

Political offices
Preceded by Michael Scuse	United States Secretary of Agriculture; Acting; 2017	Succeeded by Sonny Perdue
