= Patty Judge =

American politician (born 1943)

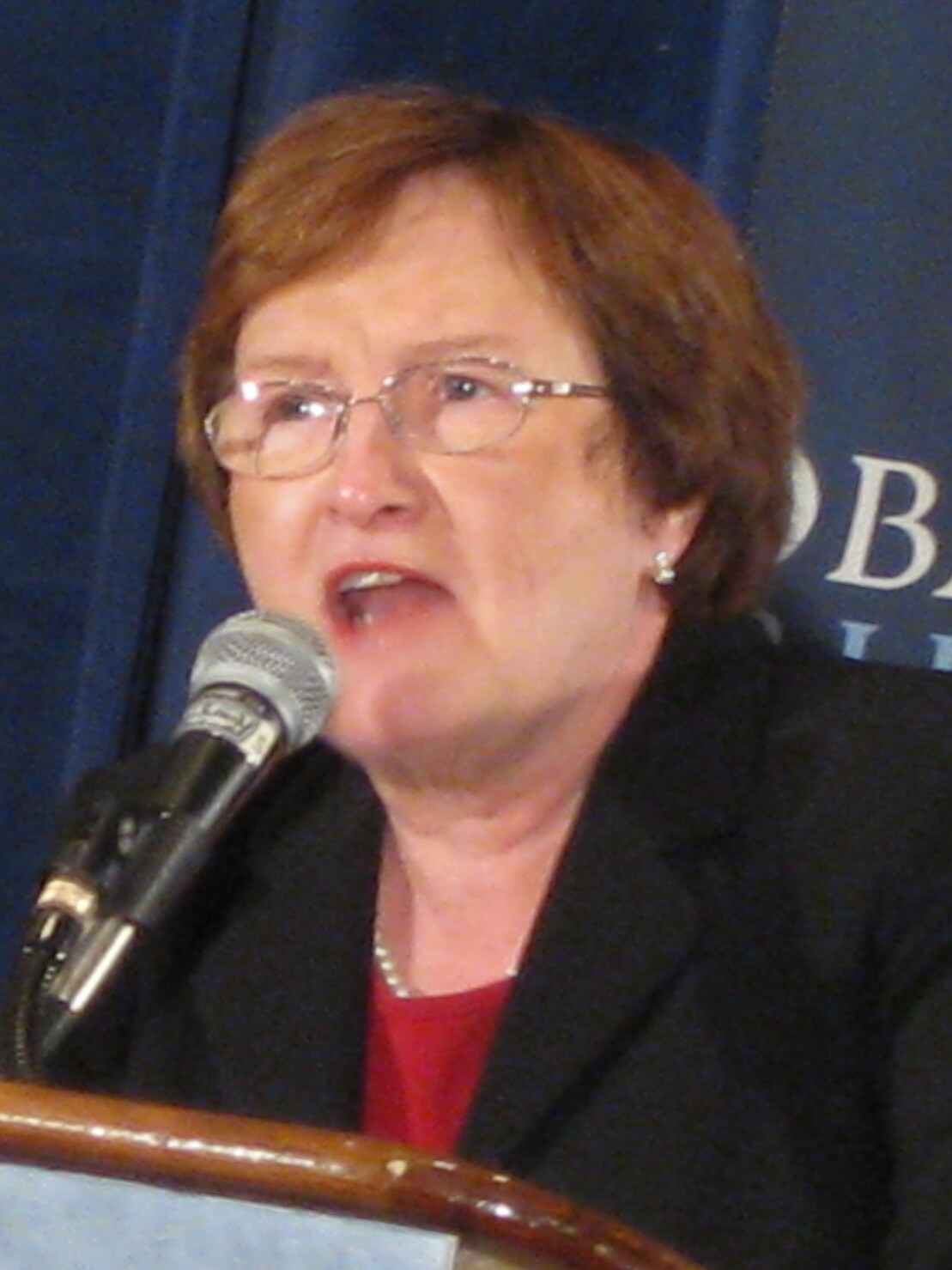
- Judge in 2008

45th Lieutenant Governor of Iowa
- In office January 12, 2007 – January 14, 2011
- Governor: Chet Culver
- Preceded by: Sally Pederson
- Succeeded by: Kim Reynolds

13th Secretary of Agriculture of Iowa
- In office January 15, 1999 – January 12, 2007
- Governor: Tom Vilsack
- Preceded by: Dale Cochran
- Succeeded by: Bill Northey

Member of the Iowa Senate from the 46th district
- In office January 11, 1993 – January 10, 1999
- Preceded by: Leonard Boswell
- Succeeded by: John Judge

Personal details
- Born: Patty Jean Poole; November 2, 1943 (age 83) Fort Madison, Iowa, U.S.
- Party: Democratic
- Spouse: John Judge (m. 1969)
- Education: Iowa Methodist School of Nursing (RN); University of Iowa

Patty Jean Judge (née Poole; born November 2, 1943) is an American politician who served as the 45th lieutenant governor of Iowa from 2007 to 2011 and the 13th secretary of agriculture of Iowa from 1999 to 2007. She unsuccessfully ran for re-election as lieutenant governor in 2010 after being elected to the office in 2006 with Chet Culver as governor.

== Early life, education and career ==
Judge was born in Fort Madison, Iowa to Lester Poole and Lois (née Gares) Poole. She graduated from Albia High School in 1962. She received a Registered Nursing degree from Iowa Methodist School of Nursing in 1965, which later merged to join St. Luke's Regional Medical Center. She also attended the University of Iowa.

== Early career ==
As a registered nurse Judge has worked in public health. She developed the first in-service education program and first utilization review program for the Monroe County Hospital.

With her interest in economic development she was prompted to earn a real estate broker's license and set up a small business specializing in the selling and appraising of farms. She also bought her parents' real estate business. During the farm crisis of the 1980s she was a mediator for the Iowa Farmer Creditor Mediation Service.

== Political career ==
=== Iowa Senate ===
In 1992, Judge ran against Richard Arnold, a Republican from Russell, Iowa, and was elected to the Iowa Senate from Iowa's 46th District. Judge won 13,269 votes against Arnold's 12,009 votes. She ran again in 1996. against Claude Neill, a Republican from Clio, Iowa, and was re-elected, winning 14,155 votes against Neill's 8,996 votes.

During her time in the Senate she served in the roles of assistant majority leader and assistant minority leader. She was the ranking member of the Agriculture Committee. Other committees she served on were the Senate Natural Resources, Ways and Means, Appropriations, Small Business and Economic Development, and Human Services.

=== Iowa Secretary of Agriculture ===
Judge was first elected to the office of Secretary of Agriculture of Iowa in 1998. She ran against Dan Brown of the Republican Party, Edward L. Peak of the Reform Party, Samuel James of the Natural Law Party and Ronald Tigner as a write in candidate. Judge won at 451,715 votes, Brown lost at 424,940 votes. Peak, James and Tigner won a combined 25,599 votes.

She was re-elected in 2002. She ran against John Askew of the Republican Party, Brian Russell Depew of the Iowa Green Party, Fritz Groszkruger of the Libertarian Party and Ronald Tigner as a return write in candidate. Judge won at 490,561 votes, Askew lost at 446,136 votes. Depew, Groszkruger and Tigner won a combined 44,403 votes.

She holds the honor of being the first woman to serve as Iowa Secretary of Agriculture. Judge brought to the office a strong background in production agriculture, personnel management, finance, and the management of state government.

=== Iowa Lieutenant Governor ===
On February 15, 2006, Judge stepped down as a candidate for Governor of Iowa, announced her endorsement of Iowa Secretary of State Chet Culver for the office, and became his running mate as lieutenant governor. On November 7, 2006, she was elected Lieutenant Governor of Iowa with a vote of 569,021. During this tenure she was a Homeland Security Advisor and was critical in helping with rescue effort during the 2008 floods, worked on racial disparity in the prisons and championed children's health programs.

Culver and Judge lost in their bid for re-election in 2010 to Terry Branstad and Kim Reynolds. Culver and Judge won 484798 to Branstad's and Reynolds' 592,494 votes.

Judge announced on December 30, 2012, that she declined to run for lieutenant governor in 2014.

=== Co-chair of America's Renewable Future ===
In 2015, Judge was appointed the co-chair of a new bipartisan PAC called America's Renewable Future, whose sole purpose is to make candidates visiting Iowa aware of the need for the Renewable Fuel Standard. Judge has since met with many potential candidates to show them the importance of the RFS. Judge will continue to serve in this role throughout the 2016 election cycle.

=== 2016 U.S. Senate election ===
On March 4, 2016, she announced her candidacy for the Democratic nomination for the United States Senate. She stated that her reason to run for the seat was "primarily in response to the rejection of hearings for the Supreme Court nominee". Specifically, Grassley's refusal to give Merrick Garland a hearing.

She won the primary, with a vote of 46,322, on June 7, beating Rob Hogg, who won 37,801, Tom Fiegen, who won 6,573, and Bob Krause, who won 6,425. The New York Times deemed her a "formidable challenger" to Grassley.

She lost the general election to Republican incumbent Chuck Grassley by a 24.4% margin, a 375,000 vote loss.

== Personal life ==
Judge is a lifelong resident of southern Iowa and was raised in Albia, Iowa. She and her husband John have owned a cow-calf farm in Monroe County for thirty-five years. She has been dedicated to community service, serving on the Albia Chamber of Commerce Board of Directors, as a 4-H leader, a member of PEO, an honorary FFA Chapter Farmer and a member of the Iowa State Fair Board.

She married John Judge in 1969. Her husband also served in the Iowa Senate. They have three sons, Joseph, Douglas and W. Dien, and five grandchildren. She is a Roman Catholic. She attends St. Mary's Church in Albia.

In 2011 Judge's son Joe, a high school U.S. history & government teacher also in Albia, announced his intent to be the second generation of the family to serve in Iowa government by running for the Iowa's 80th House District in 2012. Joe won the primary, uncontested, receiving 504 out of 603 votes. Joe lost to Larry Sheets in the general election, with Sheets winning 7,271 and Joe Judge winning 7,161, a loss of only 110 votes.

On August 24, 2013, Judge was named to the Iowa Women's Hall of Fame.

== Electoral history ==
United States Senate election in Iowa, 2016
Party	Candidate	Votes	%	±%
Republican	Chuck Grassley (incumbent)	926,007	60.09%	−4.26%
Democratic	Patty Judge	549,460	35.66%	+2.36%
Libertarian	Charles Aldrich	41,794	2.71%	+0.44%
Independent	Jim Hennager	17,649	1.15%	N/A
Independent	Michael Luick-Thrams	4,441	0.29%	N/A
n/a	Write-ins	1,685	0.11%	+0.03%
Total votes		1,541,036	100.0%	N/A
Republican hold				

United States Senate Democratic Primary election in Iowa, 2016
Party	Candidate	Votes	%
Democratic	Patty Judge	46,322	47.62%
Democratic	Rob Hogg	37,801	38.86%
Democratic	Tom Fiegen	6,573	6.76%
Democratic	Bob Krause	6,425	6.60%
Democratic	Write-ins	154	0.16%
Total votes		97,275	100.00%

2010 Iowa gubernatorial election
Party	Candidate	Votes	%	±%
Republican	Terry Branstad/Kim Reynolds	592,494	52.81%	+8.43%
Democratic	Chet Culver/Patty Judge (incumbent)	484,798	43.21%	−10.81%
Iowa Party	Jonathan Narcisse/Richard Marlar	20,859	1.86%	n/a
Libertarian	Eric Cooper/Nick Weltha	14,398	1.28%	+0.74%
Independent	Gregory James Hughes/Robin Prior-Calef	3,884	0.35%	n/a
Socialist Workers	David Rosenfeld/Helen Meyers	2,757	0.25%	+0.06%
Write-in		2,823	0.25%	n/a
Total votes		1,122,013	100.00%	n/a
Republican gain from Democratic				

Iowa gubernatorial election, 2006
Party	Candidate	Votes	%	±%
Democratic	Chet Culver/Patty Judge	569,021	54.02%	+1.33%
Republican	Jim Nussle/Bob Vander Plaats	467,425	44.38%	−0.13%
Green	Wendy Barth/Richard L. Johnson	7,850	0.75%	−0.68%
Libertarian	Kevin Litten/Mark Nelson	5,735	0.54%	−0.74%
Socialist Workers	Mary Martin/Kevin A. Dwire	1,974	0.19%	
Write-ins		1,250	0.12%	
Majority		101,596	9.65%	+1.48%
Turnout		1,053,255		
Democratic hold		Swing		

2002 Iowa Secretary of Agriculture Election Results
Party	Candidate	Votes	%	±%
Democratic	Patty Judge	490,561	49.98%	
Republican	John Askew	446,136	45.45%	
Iowa Green Party	Brian Russell Depew	21,416	2.18%	
Write-ins	Ronald Tigner	11,776	1.14%	
Libertarian	Fritz Groszkruger	11,211	0.85%	
Turnout		981,447	99.6%	

1998 Iowa Secretary of Agriculture Election Results
Party	Candidate	Votes	%	±%
Democratic	Patty Judge	451,715	50.04%	
Republican	Dan Brown	424,940	47.08%	
Reform	Edward L. Peak	7,767	0.86%	
Natural Law	Samuel James	7,734	0.85%	
Write-ins	Ronald Tigner	10,098	1.11%	
Turnout		902,556	99.96%	

1996 Iowa Senate Election Results
Party	Candidate	Votes	%	±%
Democratic	Patty Judge	14,155	61.14%	
Republican	Claude Neill	8,996	38.85%	
Turnout		23,151	99.99%	

1992 Iowa Senate Election Results
Party	Candidate	Votes	%	±%
Democratic	Patty Judge	13,269	52.49%	
Republican	Richard Arnold	12,009	47.50%	
Turnout		25,278	99.99%	

== See also ==
- List of female lieutenant governors in the United States

Iowa Senate
Preceded by Leonard Boswell	Member of the Iowa Senate from the 46th district 1993–1999	Succeeded by John Judge
Political offices
Preceded by Dale Cochran	Secretary of Agriculture of Iowa; 1999–2007	Succeeded by Bill Northey
Preceded by Sally Pederson	Lieutenant Governor of Iowa; 2007–2011	Succeeded by Kim Reynolds
Party political offices
Preceded by Dale M. Cochran	Democratic nominee for Secretary of Agriculture of Iowa; 1998, 2002	Succeeded by Denise O'Brien
Preceded by Sally Pederson	Democratic nominee for Lieutenant Governor of Iowa; 2006, 2010	Succeeded by Monica Vernon
Preceded by Roxanne Conlin	Democratic nominee for U.S. Senator from Iowa (Class 3); 2016	Succeeded by Michael Franken
