= Islam A. Siddiqui =

Indian-American scientist, government official and lobbyist

- इस्लाम सिद्दिक़ी
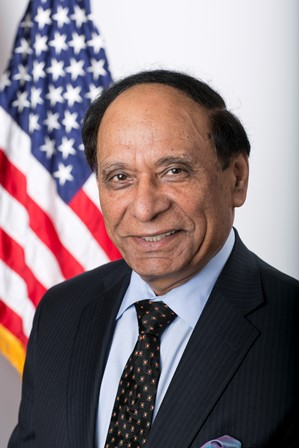

United States Chief Agricultural Negotiator
- In office October 21, 2011 – December 12, 2013
- President: Barack Obama
- Succeeded by: Darci Vetter

Personal details
- Born: Haldwani, India
- Education: G. B. Pant University of Agriculture and Technology (BS); University of Illinois Urbana-Champaign (MS, PhD)

Islam A. Siddiqui (Hindi: इस्लाम सिद्दिक़ी) is an Indian-American scientist, and government official, and lobbyist who served as the Chief Agricultural Negotiator in the Office of the United States Trade Representative. Prior to this, he was Vice President for Science and Regulatory Affairs at CropLife America, and a career official in the California Department of Food and Agriculture.

== Education ==
Siddiqui earned a Bachelor of Science degree in plant protection from G. B. Pant University of Agriculture and Technology in Pantnagar, India, and M.S. and Ph.D. degrees in plant pathology, both from the University of Illinois Urbana-Champaign.

== Career ==
Siddiqui served the Clinton Administration in several capacities from 1997 to 2001. At the United States Department of Agriculture, Siddiqui was Undersecretary for Marketing and Regulatory Programs, Senior Trade Advisor to Secretary Dan Glickman, and Deputy Undersecretary for Marketing and Regulatory Programs. Before joining USDA, Siddiqui spent 28 years with the California Department of Food and Agriculture.

From 2004 to 2009, Dr. Siddiqui served on the United States Department of Commerce's Industry Trade Advisory Committee on Chemicals, Pharmaceuticals, and Health/Science Products and Services, which advises the United States Secretary of Commerce and United States Trade Representative on international trade issues related to these sectors. From 2001 and 2003, Siddiqui was appointed as Senior Associate at the Center for Strategic and International Studies, where he focused on agricultural biotechnology and food security issues.

From 2001 to 2008, Siddiqui was a registered lobbyist with CropLife America, representing biotechnology companies including BASF, Bayer CropScience, Dow AgroSciences, DuPont, FMC Corp., Monsanto, Sumitomo, and Syngenta.

On April 2, 2010, President Barack Obama named Siddiqui to the post of Chief Agricultural Negotiator in a recess appointment. Siddiqui's previous nomination to the position remained on the Senate docket for more than a year and a half. His nomination was reported to the Senate floor from the United States Senate Committee on Finance on October 11, 2011, and senators finally voted to confirm Siddiqui as part of an en bloc group of nominations confirmed early in the morning hours of October 21, 2011. Siddiqui submitted his resignation December 12, 2013.

=== Position on genetically modified foods ===
Siddiqui is a supporter of genetically modified foods for human consumption, and repudiates their potential health risks. In 1999, he worked against the mandatory labeling of genetically modified foods in Japan, stating that such labeling "would suggest a health risk where there is none." In 2003, he criticized the European Union's precautionary rejection of the importation of genetically modified foods, stating that the ban was tantamount to "denying food to starving people." In 2009 he called for a "second green revolution" employing biotechnology and genetic engineering.

In 1998, as Under Secretary for Marketing and Regulatory Programs at the United States Department of Agriculture, Siddiqui oversaw the release of the National Organic Program's standards for organic food labeling. The standards permitted both irradiated and genetically modified foods to be labeled as organic. (The standards were subsequently revised in response to public opposition.)

In 2005, speaking on behalf of CropLife America, Siddiqui stated his satisfaction with the defeat of local propositions in California that would have banned cultivation of genetically modified crops.
