= White House Rural Council =

Rural development council established and later dissolved

The White House Rural Council was an entity within President Obama's Domestic Policy Council of the Executive Office of the President of the United States. The council was formed on June 14, 2012, and was intended to assist low-income residents residing in rural communities as an effort to build on the administrations rural economic strategy by promoting economic prosperity and quality of life. The Council was overseen by the Secretary of Agriculture and the members include the leaders of 25 executive agencies. President Trump dissolved the White House Rural Council on April 25, 2017 with Executive Order 13790.

White House Rural Council United States Secretary of Agriculture - Chairman
Committee Member	Committee Member	Committee Member	Committee Member	Committee Member
Department of Treasury	Department of Defense	Department of Justice	Department of the Interior	Department of Commerce
Department of Labor	Department of Health and Human Services	Department of Housing and Urban Development	Department of Transportation	Department of Energy
Department of Education	Department of Veterans Affairs	Department of Homeland Security	Environmental Protection Agency	Federal Communications Commission
Office of Management and Budget	Office of Science and Technology Policy	Office of National Drug Control Policy	Council of Economic Advisers	Domestic Policy Council
National Economic Council	Small Business Administration	Council on Environmental Quality	White House Office of Public Engagement and Intergovernmental Affairs	White House Office of Cabinet Affairs

== Objective ==
The council's primary objective is to work across government to ensure that food, fiber, and energy will be protected and managed by facilitating the flow of capital in the rural areas. This will be accomplished by identifying and facilitating regional economic opportunities associated with developing energy, outdoor recreation, and other conservation related activities while addressing the economic obstacles that prevent the rural areas from regenerating. The members of the committee are further responsible for establishing forums within those rural areas for the purpose of engaging “stakeholders, including farmers, ranchers, and local citizens, on issues in rural communities.” During such visits, the Rural Council members are expected to “promote and coordinate private-sector partnership” and “find new ways for the government to partner with organizations in solving shared problems, and develop new, innovative models of partnership.” The forum's and town hall meeting's also serve as a means to identify and increase "access to quality healthcare, education, and housing" while strengthening the infrastructure in place within that region.

== Basis for Action ==
According to the Population Reference Bureau, the “rural” region includes an autonomous suburban area with a population fewer than 50,000. While these areas have made significant contributions to the overall economy in the past, concerns that “many communities could shrink to virtual ghost towns as they shutter businesses and close down schools” poses a potential threat to the overall economy.

As many leaders begin to examine and analyze the extent of the effects of the rural decline, the growing consensus among legislators, scholars, and economists reveals that decelerating the impact will be difficult and may require “counties [to] let go of some of their provincial pride and consider consolidating resources, on economic development if nothing else. In other words, combining to form regional economic development agencies.”.

== Implementation ==
During Summer 2011, the council members along with administrative staff, travelled throughout the United States. During the travels, council members had an opportunity to meet rural residents residing within the 200 rural communities in 46 states that were identified for this initiative. Prior to the visit, council members and staff, carefully identified the key leaders specific for the community. The identified leaders, constituents, and other stakeholders were invited to partake in a community forum or town hall meeting to discuss the various areas of concern. The results of the visits were published in the "White House Rural Council: Feedback from Rural America" report.
