= Kevin Watkins =

Development academic and leader

Kevin Charles Watkins is at the London School of Economics as a visiting professor of development practice at the Firoz Lalji Institute for Africa. Recently the chief executive of Save the Children UK, from October 2016 until his resignation in July 2021. He was previously at the Overseas Development Institute as executive director in June 2013. His research focuses on education, globalization and human development. He is a former nonresident senior fellow at the Center for Universal Education at the Brookings Institution. He was previously the director and lead author of the UNESCO's Education for All Global Monitoring Report.

== Academic background ==
Kevin Watkins has a BA in politics and social science from Durham University (University College). He also has a doctorate from Oxford University. He spent one year in India doing research for his dissertation: "The economics and politics of Indian Nationalism from 1880–1947".

== Career ==
Kevin Watkins served as researcher for the House of Commons Foreign Affairs Committee (1983). He was then appointed as head of international development at the Catholic Institute for International Relations (1987–2001). He also became head of research in Oxfam (1991) where he covered issues such as debt relief, education, social policy and poverty.

In 2000, he was part of the drafting committee for the framework of action and the six Education For All goals during the World Education Forum.

From 2004 to 2008, he was director of the United Nations Development Program’s Human Development Report. During this time, he directed a total of three reports, from 2005 to 2008:

- Human Development Report 2007/8

Fighting climate change: Human solidarity in a divided world

- Human Development Report 2006

Beyond scarcity: Power, poverty and the global water crisis

- Human Development Report 2005

International cooperation at a crossroads: Aid, trade and security in an unequal world

As lead author of the Education for All Global Monitoring Report he produced the 2009, 2010 and 2011 reports:

- EFA Global Monitoring Report 2011

The hidden crisis: Armed conflict and education

- EFA Global Monitoring Report 2010

Reaching the marginalized

- EFA Global Monitoring Report 2009

Overcoming inequality: why governance matters

He was senior visiting research fellow at the Global Economic Governance Programme at University College of the University of Oxford. He has participated on the World Economic Forum as a discussion leader on the IdeasLab on the Global Redesign Initiative (Values and People) in 2010. In addition, he is a board member of the Center for Global Development, UNICEF’s Innocenti Research Centre and the Journal of International Development. He also has a blog on The Guardian.

== See also ==
- Education For All
- Human Development Report
