= Gregory M. Frazier =

American diplomat

Ambassador Gregory M. Frazier of Abilene, Kansas, is senior vice president for International and Regulatory Affairs for the International Dairy Foods Association (IDFA).

Prior to that he was the Chief Agricultural Negotiator and Special Negotiator for Agriculture and Food Policy in the Office of the United States Trade Representative from spring 2000 until the end of the Clinton Administration. Mr. Frazier had previously served as Chief of Staff of the U.S. Department of Agriculture from January 1995 to March 2000. Mr. Frazier also served as a professional staff member for the House of Representatives Permanent Select Committee on Intelligence and Staff Director for the House Subcommittee on Wheat, Soybeans and Feed Grains of the Agriculture Committee. From January 1977 until December 1986, Mr. Frazier served in several capacities for then-Congressman Dan Glickman.

Mr. Frazier received a B.A. from Kansas State University in 1975 and an M.A. from the University of Connecticut in 1976.

== See also ==
- Chief Agricultural Negotiator
