= John Judge (politician) =

American politician

Second Gentleman of Iowa
- In role January 12, 2007 – January 14, 2011
- Governor: Chet Culver
- Preceded by: Tom Zimmerman
- Succeeded by: Kevin Reynolds

Member of the Iowa Senate from the 46th district
- In office January 11, 1999 – January 8, 2001
- Preceded by: Patty Judge
- Succeeded by: Paul McKinley

Personal details
- Born: September 20, 1944 (age 82) Albia, Iowa, U.S.
- Party: Democratic
- Spouse: Patty Poole (m. 1969)
- Children: 3
- Education: Iowa State University
- Occupation: Farmer

Military service
- Allegiance: United States
- Branch/service: United States Marine Corps
- Years of service: 1967–1970
- Battles/wars: Vietnam War

John William Judge (born September 20, 1944) is an American politician.

Born in Albia, Iowa, to William P. and Mildred, Judge graduated from Albia Community High School and went to Iowa State University. He served in the United States Marine Corps and was stationed in Vietnam serving with the military police. Judge was a farmer and banker. He is married to Patty Judge, who served in the Iowa Senate, and then as Lieutenant Governor of Iowa. Judge has three sons; Douglas, W. Dien, and Joseph. Judge also served in the Iowa Senate from 1999 to 2003 and was a Democrat.

Judge was a member of the Farm Bureau, Knights of Columbus and American Legion.

Iowa Senate
Preceded by Patty Judge	46th district 1999–2001	Succeeded by Paul McKinley
