= Risk Management Agency =

Agency of the US Department of Agriculture

Agency overview
- Formed: 1996; 30 years ago
- Jurisdiction: United States Department of Agriculture
- Agency executive: Heather Manzano, Acting Administrator
- Website: www.rma.usda.gov

The Risk Management Agency (RMA) is an agency of the U.S. Department of Agriculture, which manages the Federal Crop Insurance Corporation (FCIC). The current Administrator is Heather Manzano in an acting capacity.

== History ==
The Risk Management Agency (RMA) was created in 1996 by the Federal Agriculture Improvement and Reform Act of 1996 to operate and manage the Federal Crop Insurance Corporation (FCIC).

The FCIC was created in 1938, during the Great Depression, to provide insurance for farmers to allow them to profit from crop production even under difficult agricultural and economic circumstances. Many American farmers were forced to leave their farms as a result of the Dust Bowl during this period.

== Programs, structure, staff, and budget ==
The Risk Management Agency (RMA) has three program areas: Insurance Services, which provides federal crop insurance to American farmers; Product Management, which develops and reviews crop insurance products to ensure actuarial soundness; and Compliance, which monitors federal crop insurance programs for fraud, waste, and abuse.

The RMA is managed by an Administrator appointed by the United States Secretary of Agriculture. The RMA Administrator serves as the non-voting manager of the Federal Crop Insurance Corporation Board.

The RMA employs Deputy Administrators to manage each of the three program areas, as well as a Chief Financial Officer, Chief Information Officer, a Director of the Office of Civil Rights, and a Director of the Office of External Affairs. There are ten RMA regional offices around the country. The RMA employs more than 450 people in offices around the country.

The RMA had an operating budget of $74.8 million during Fiscal Year 2016, and managed more than $102 billion in insurance liability during 2015.

== See also ==
- Risk management
