= Iowa Green Party =

- Membership (2026): ▲2,489
- Ideology: Green politics
- Political position: Left-wing
- National affiliation: Green Party of the United States
- Colors: Green

The Iowa Green Party is the Iowa-affiliate of the Green Party of the United States (GPUS). The 2013 Annual Meeting of the GPUS was held at the Iowa Memorial Union in Iowa City, Iowa.

== Candidates ==
The 2016 nominee for President of the United States was Jill Stein. In 2000, Ralph Nader was on the presidential ballot of the Iowa Green Party and received over 2% of the vote, qualifying the party for ballot access. Two years later, Jay Robinson ran as the Green Party nominee for Governor and received 1.43% and the party lost ballot access. In 2004, neither statewide candidate (David Cobb for President nor Daryl A. Northrop for U.S. Senate) received the minimum 2% of the vote. In 2006, Wendy Barth, a software developer and peace activist, ran for Governor as the Iowa Green Party nominee. She finished in third place of five ballot qualified candidates with 0.75% of the vote. Barth ran two years later for Iowa's second congressional district, again finishing third. She gained 2.18% of the vote.

National Green Party nominees for President Ralph Nader (2000), David Cobb (2004), Cynthia McKinney (2008) and Jill Stein (2012 and 2016) have all appeared on the ballot.

== Election Results ==
Presidential Election Results
2000	Ralph Nader	29,374	2.23%
2004	David Cobb	1,141	0.09%
2008	Cynthia McKinney	1,423	0.09%
2012	Jill Stein	3,769	0.24%
2016	Jill Stein	11,479	0.73%
2020	Howie Hawkins	3,075	0.18%
2024	Jill Stein	Not on Ballot	

== Related ==
- List of State Green Parties
- Iowa Libertarian Party
- Political party strength in Iowa
- Politics of Iowa
- Government of Iowa
- Elections in Iowa
- List of politics by U.S. state
