= Under Secretary of Agriculture for Farm and Foreign Agricultural Services =

United States Under Secretary of Agriculture for Farm and Foreign Agricultural Services

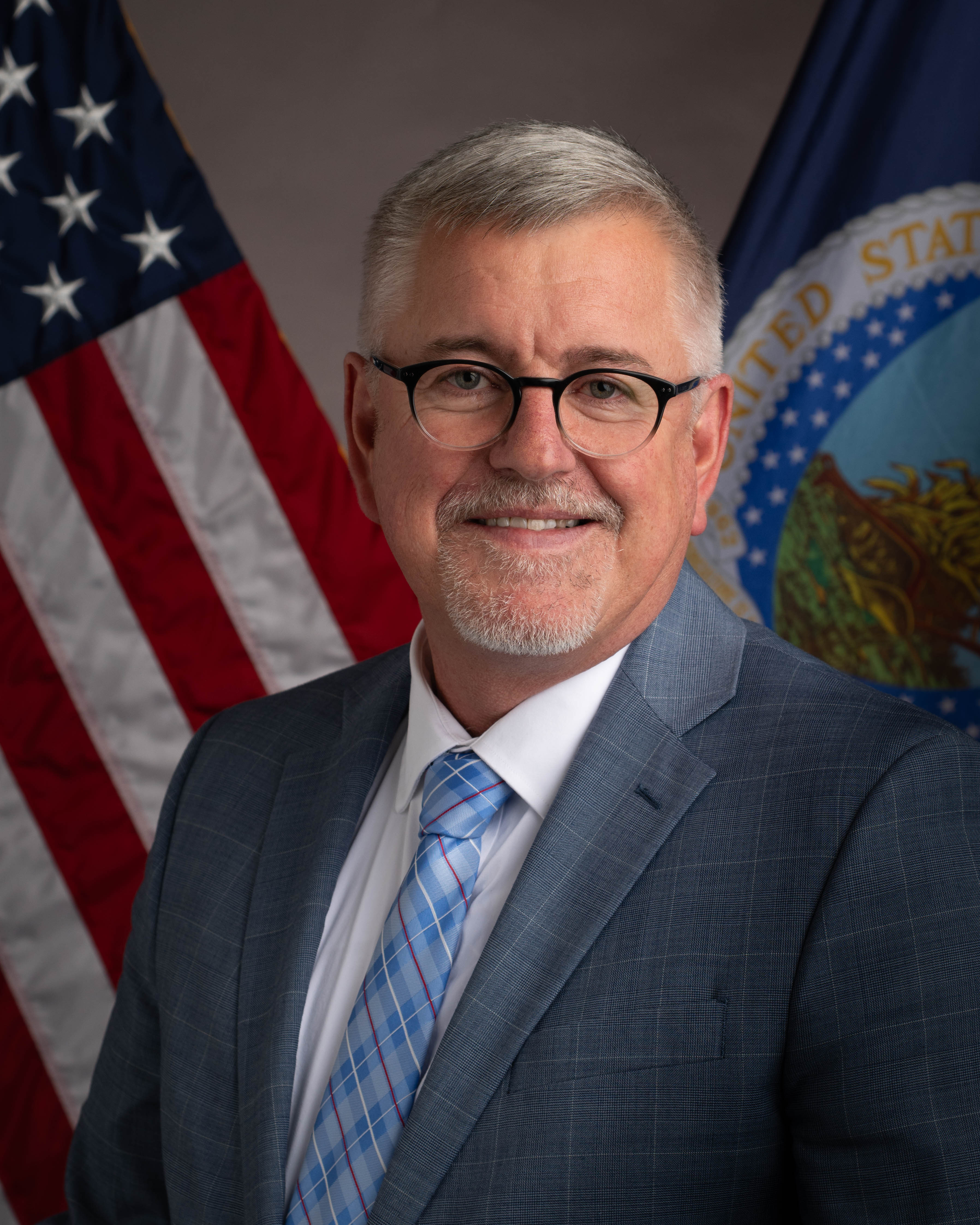
- Incumbent; Richard Fordyce since September 25, 2025
- Formation: 1969
- First holder: Clarence Palmby
- Website: Official website

The under secretary of agriculture for farm and foreign agricultural services was the third-ranking official in the United States Department of Agriculture prior to reorganization of several mission areas, announced on May 11, 2017. The mission area of USDA's purpose was to "help to keep America's farmers and ranchers in business as they face the uncertainties of weather and markets..." and that "...deliver[s] commodity, credit, conservation, disaster, and emergency assistance programs that help improve the stability and strength of the agricultural economy." The under secretary was traditionally appointed to serve as the president of the Commodity Credit Corporation.

The under secretary was appointed by the president of the United States with the consent of the United States Senate to serve at the pleasure of the president. The farm and foreign agricultural services mission area was divided into the mission areas of farm production and conservation (FPAC) and trade and foreign agricultural affairs, completing the creation of an undersecretary of agriculture for trade and foreign agricultural affairs which was mandated by the 2014 Farm Bill.

== Overview ==
The under secretary is the principal officer of the United States Department of Agriculture charged with administering programs and providing services which focus on supporting a sustainable and competitive American agricultural system. The under secretary administers agricultural commodity insurance, farm loans, conservation, environmental, emergency assistance, and domestic and international food assistance programs. These programs are intended to provide cost-effective means of managing risk for agricultural producers in order to improve the economic stability of agriculture. The under secretary's mission area also represents the diverse interests of the U.S. food and agricultural sector abroad by managing the department's international activities, addressing market access constraints, and working to expand markets for U.S. agricultural, fish and forest products overseas.

The under secretary provides leadership and oversight for the Farm Service Agency, the Risk Management Agency, and the Foreign Agricultural Service. The president normally appoints the under secretary as president of the Commodity Credit Corporation (CCC), though in the past this latter responsibility has sometimes been held by other USDA officials. The under secretary for FFAS also normally chairs the interagency Food Assistance Policy Council and is a member of the interagency Trade Policy Review Group (TPRG).

The under secretary is the third highest-ranking official within the Agriculture Department, ranking behind the secretary and deputy secretary, and holds a Level III position within the Executive Schedule. Since January 2010, the annual rate of pay for Level III is $165,300.

== History ==
The Department of Agriculture was made a Cabinet-level department in 1889. For many years, the secretary of agriculture supervised chiefs of bureaus of the department, as was the norm throughout the U.S. government. Subsequently, a single subcabinet position of assistant secretary was created. Over time, this position was upgraded to under secretary, under which in turn was a single assistant secretary.

In 1953, Secretary Ezra Taft Benson lobbied for the creation of additional assistant secretary positions, which Congress approved that summer. Two of these positions, the assistant secretary for the Foreign Agricultural Service and the assistant secretary for commodity marketing and adjustment, were merged in September 1953, and in December of that year the vacant position was designated as the assistant secretary for stabilization. Between 1953 and 1962, the responsibilities of today's under secretary for farm and foreign agricultural services were thus shared by two assistant secretaries, for "stabilization" and for "marketing and foreign agriculture". The former oversaw the Commodity Stabilization Service and its successors, including the Agricultural Stabilization and Conservation Service, while the latter oversaw the Agricultural Marketing Service and the Foreign Agricultural Service. In 1963, the positions were reshuffled, with foreign agriculture (oversight of the Foreign Agricultural Service and the newly created International Agricultural Development Service) assigned to an assistant secretary for international affairs, and marketing and stabilization combined under an assistant secretary for marketing and consumer services. In 1969, responsibility for both foreign affairs and farm support (stabilization) programs was consolidated into a single position entitled the assistant secretary for international affairs and commodity programs, with marketing remaining under its own, separate assistant secretary.

The Agricultural Trade Act of 1978 upgraded the assistant secretary for international affairs and commodity programs to under secretary. At the time, it was the only under secretary-level subcabinet position in USDA, as the official previously called under secretary had been retitled as deputy secretary, in keeping with common U.S. government practice. Subsequent USDA reorganizations, notably that of 1994, upgraded most USDA subcabinet officials to under secretary status, however.

Dorothy Jacobson, a longtime aide to Orville Freeman, was the first woman appointed to one of these positions, in 1964. This made her the first woman to serve in a subcabinet position in USDA.

Another former assistant secretary, James T. Ralph, was a figure in the Billie Sol Estes scandal and was forced to leave federal service. This scandal led directly to the 1963 shakeup of USDA, a reassignment of responsibilities for oversight of commodity programs, and investigation of allegations of corrupt activities by state-level employees of the Agricultural Stabilization and Conservation Service.

As trade in agricultural products continued to expand, and foreign markets became the primary destination for many U.S. grown commodities, there was increasing pressure to have a more visible member of USDA dedicated solely to expanding trade opportunities and resolving issues. Section 3208 of the Agricultural Act of 2014 mandated "The Secretary... shall propose a reorganization of international trade functions for imports and exports of the Department of Agriculture." Though enacted on February 7, 2014, the plan to formalize the reorganization was not announced until May 11, 2017. The plan put forth by USDA Secretary Sonny Perdue dissolved the farm and foreign agricultural services mission area and created a new mission area for trade and foreign agricultural affairs, which houses the Foreign Agricultural Service, and the farm production and conservation mission area, which contains the Farm Service Agency, Risk Management Agency, and Natural Resources Conservation Service (previously a part of the natural resources and environment (NRE) mission area).

== Reporting officials ==
Officials reporting to the Under Secretary include:

- Deputy Under Secretary of Agriculture for Farm and Foreign Agricultural Services
- Administrator, Foreign Agricultural Service
- Administrator, Farm Service Agency
- Administrator, Risk Management Agency

== Officeholders ==
=== Eisenhower administration ===
- Romeo Ennis Short, Assistant Secretary for the Foreign Agricultural Service, July 21, 1953 – September 28, 1953
- John H. Davis, Assistant Secretary for Commodity Marketing and Adjustment, February 1953 – July 31, 1954 (took over foreign agriculture in October 1953)
- Ross Rizley, Assistant Secretary, December 1953 – December 1954
- Earl Butz, Assistant Secretary for Marketing and Foreign Agriculture, July 31, 1954 – July 31, 1957
- James A. McConnell, Assistant Secretary for Stabilization, January 1955 – December 1955
- Don Paarlberg, Assistant Secretary for Marketing and Foreign Agriculture, July 31, 1957 – September 1958
- Marvin L. McLain, Assistant Secretary for Agricultural Stabilization, ?1956–1961?
- Clarence Ludlow Miller, Assistant Secretary for Marketing and Foreign Agriculture, February 1959 – January 1961

=== Kennedy–Johnson administrations ===
- James Tyree Ralph, Assistant Secretary for Agricultural Stabilization, January 1961 – March 1962 (fired for accepting gifts from Billie Sol Estes; Sec. Freeman subsequently shook up the USDA assistant secretary responsibilities)
- John Duncan, Jr., for Marketing and Foreign Agriculture, January 1961 – July 1963 (assumed Stabilization after Ralph was fired, effective July 18, 1962)
- Roland Renne, Assistant Secretary for International Affairs, March 1963 to March 1964
- George L. Mehren, Assistant Secretary for Marketing and Consumer Services, August 1963 – 1968 (this included responsibility for agricultural stabilization)
- Dorothy Houston Jacobson, Assistant Secretary for International Affairs, March 20, 1964 – 1969?

=== 1969 onwards ===
Foreign agriculture and agricultural stabilization merged under one assistant secretary.

No.	Portrait	Name	Office	Took office	Left office	President(s)
1		Clarence D. Palmby	Assistant Secretary for International Affairs and Commodity Programs	January 1969	June 1972	Richard Nixon (1969–1974)
2		Carroll G. Brunthaver	Assistant Secretary for International Affairs and Commodity Programs	June 1972	January 1974	Richard Nixon (1969–1974)
3		Clayton Keith Yeutter	Assistant Secretary for International Affairs and Commodity Programs	March 1974	1975	Richard Nixon (1969–1974); Gerald Ford (1974–1977)
4		Richard E. Bell	Assistant Secretary for International Affairs and Commodity Programs	July 1975	1977	Gerald Ford (1974–1977)
5		Dale E. Hathaway	Assistant Secretary for International Affairs and Commodity Programs	April 1977	1981	Jimmy Carter (1977–1981)
6		Seeley G. Lodwick	Under Secretary for International Affairs and Commodity Programs	1981	January 1983	Ronald Reagan (1981–1989)
7		Daniel Gordon Amstutz	Under Secretary for International Affairs and Commodity Programs	May 1983	August 1987	Ronald Reagan (1981–1989)
8		Richard T. Crowder	Under Secretary for International Affairs and Commodity Programs	April 1989	July 1992	George H. W. Bush (1989–1993)
9		Eugene Moos	Under Secretary for International Affairs and Commodity Programs	March 1993	1997	Bill Clinton (1993–2001)
10		August Schumacher, Jr.	Under Secretary for Farm and Foreign Agricultural Services	1997	2001	Bill Clinton (1993–2001)
11		J.B. Penn	Under Secretary for Farm and Foreign Agricultural Services	May 2001	August 21, 2006	George W. Bush (2001–2009)
12		Mark Everett Keenum	Under Secretary for Farm and Foreign Agricultural Services	2007	January 20, 2009	George W. Bush (2001–2009)
13		James W. Miller	Under Secretary for Farm and Foreign Agricultural Services	April 8, 2009	January 2011	Barack Obama (2009–2017)
14		Michael T. Scuse	Under Secretary for Farm and Foreign Agricultural Services	May 14, 2012	January 20, 2017	Barack Obama (2009–2017)
15		Bill Northey	Under Secretary for Farm Production and Conservation	March 6, 2018	January 20, 2021	Donald Trump (2017–2021)
16		Robert Bonnie	Under Secretary for Farm Production and Conservation	November 19, 2021	January 20, 2025	Joe Biden (2021–2025)
17		Richard Fordyce	Under Secretary for Farm and Foreign Agricultural Services	September 25, 2025	Present	Donald Trump (2025–present)

== See also ==
- Commodity Credit Corporation
- Farm Service Agency
- Federal Crop Insurance Corporation
- Foreign Agricultural Service
- Risk Management Agency
- Trade Policy Committee
