= Energy policy of China =

Most energy in China comes from coal

Development of carbon dioxide emissions in China

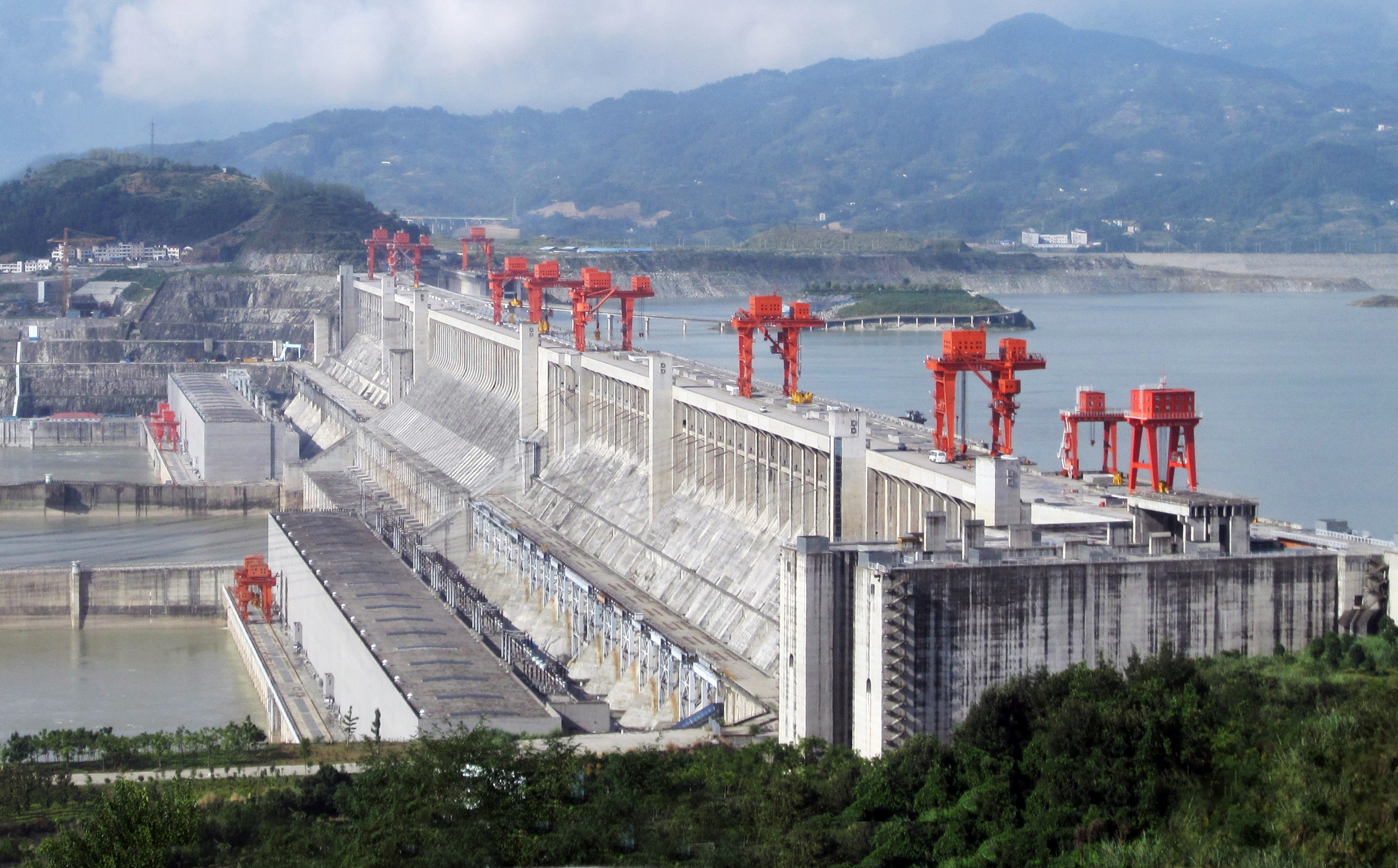
The 22,500 MW Three Gorges Dam hydroelectric power plant in China, the largest hydroelectric power station in the world.

The People's Republic of China is both the world's largest energy consumer and the largest industrial country. China is currently the world's largest emitter of greenhouse gases, and coal in China is a major cause of global warming. China is also the world's largest renewable energy producer, and the largest producer of hydroelectricity, solar power and wind power in the world. The energy policy of China is connected to its industrial policy, where the goals of China's industrial production dictate its energy demand management.

Being a country that depends heavily on foreign petroleum import for both domestic consumption and as raw materials for light industry manufacturing, electrification is a huge component of the Chinese national energy policy.

== Summary ==
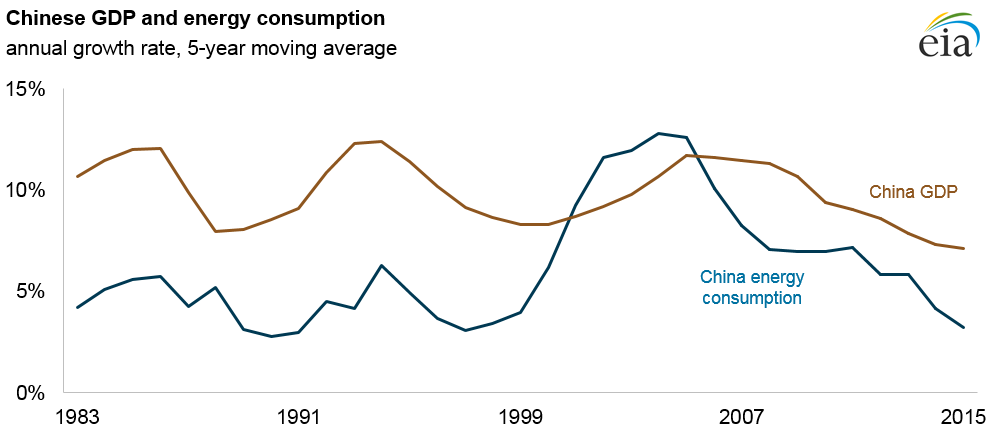
Growth in Chinese GDP and energy use since 1983

Energy in China
	Population (million)	Primary energy TWh	Production TWh	Import TWh	Electricity TWh	CO_{2} emissions Mt
2004	1,296	18,717	17,873	1,051	2,055	4,732
2007	1,320	22,746	21,097	1,939	3,073	6,028
2008	1,326	24,614	23,182	2,148	3,252	6,508
2009	1,331	26,250	24,248	3,197	3,503	6,832
2010	1,338	28,111	25,690	3,905	3,938	7,270
Change 2004–10	3.3%	50%	44%	272%	92%	54%
Mtoe = 11.63 TWh, excludes Hong Kong.

== Environment and greenhouse gas emissions ==
CO_{2} emission per year per country (2024 data)

Consumption-based CO_{2} emission per capita per year per country (2016 data)

Between 1980 and 2000, China's emissions density (its ratio of carbon dioxide equivalent emissions to gross domestic product) declined sharply. The country quadrupled its GDP while only doubling the energy it consumed. No other country at a similar stage of industrial development has matched this achievement.

On June 19, 2007, the Netherlands Environmental Assessment Agency announced that a preliminary study had indicated that China's greenhouse gas emissions for 2006 had exceeded those of the United States for the first time. The agency calculated that China's CO_{2} emissions from fossil fuels increased by 9% in 2006, while those of the United States fell by 1.4%, compared to 2005. The study used energy and cement production data from BP which they believed to be 'reasonably accurate', while warning that statistics for rapidly changing economies such as China are less reliable than data on OECD countries.

The Initial National Communication on Climate Change of the People's Republic of China calculated that carbon dioxide emissions in 2004 had risen to approximately 5.05 billion metric tons, with total greenhouse gas emissions reaching about 6.1 billion metric tons carbon dioxide equivalent.

In 2002, China ranked 2nd (after the United States) in the list of countries by carbon dioxide emissions, with emissions of 3.3 billion metric tons, representing 14.5% of the world total. In 2006, China overtook the US, producing 8% more emissions than the US to become the world's largest emitter of CO_{2} emissions. However per capita China was ranked 51st in CO_{2} emissions per capita in 2016, with emissions of 7.2 tonnes per person (compared to 15.5 tonnes per person in the United States). In addition, it has been estimated that around a third of China's carbon emissions in 2005 were due to manufacturing exported goods.

=== Energy use and carbon emissions by sector ===
In the industrial sector, six industries – electricity generation, steel, non-ferrous metals, construction materials, oil processing and chemicals – account for nearly 70% of energy use.

In the construction materials sector, China produced about 44% of the world's cement in 2006. Cement production produces more carbon emissions than any other industrial process, accounting for around 4% of global carbon emissions. By 2023 most of its installed electricity capacity came from renewable energy.

=== National Action Plan on Climate Change ===
China has been taking action on climate change for some years, with the publication on June 4, 2007, of China's first National Action Plan on Climate Change, and in that year China became the first developing country to publish a national strategy addressing global warming. The plan did not include targets for carbon dioxide emission reductions, but it has been estimated that, if fully implemented, China's annual emissions of greenhouse gases would be reduced by 1.5 billion tons of carbon dioxide equivalent by 2010. Other commentators, however, put the figure at 0.950 billion metric tons.

The publication of the strategy was officially announced during a meeting of the State Council, which called on governments and all sectors of the economy to implement the plan, and for the launch of a public environmental protection awareness campaign.

The National Action Plan includes increasing the proportion of electricity generation from renewable energy sources and from nuclear power, increasing the efficiency of coal-fired power stations, the use of cogeneration, and the development of coal-bed and coal-mine methane.

In 2007 China stated that the (now reversed) one-child policy prevented 300 million births, saving 1.3 billion tons of CO_{2} emissions based on average world per capita emissions of 4.2 tons at 2005 level.

=== 11th Five-Year Plan ===
Beginning with the 11th, each of China's five year plans have sought to move China away from energy-intensive manufacturing and into high-value sectors and have highlighted the importance of low-carbon technology as a strategic emerging industry, particularly in the areas of wind and solar power. The plan set a national energy intensity target. of a 20% reduction. It was identified as a "binding target" and focused on throughout the Plan's implementation.Policymakers viewed emissions reductions and energy conservation as the highest priority environmental matters under the 11th Five-Year Plan.

=== 12th Five-Year Plan ===
Successful achievement of emissions and energy conservation targets in the 11th Five-Year Plan shaped policymaker's approach for the 12th Five-Year Plan, prompting expanded use of binding targets to capitalize on successes in these areas.

In January 2012, as part of its 12th Five-year Plan, China published a report 12th Five-year Plan on Greenhouse Emission Control (guofa [2011] No. 41), which establishes goals of reducing carbon intensity by 17% by 2015, compared with 2010 levels and raising energy consumption intensity by 16%, relative to GDP. More demanding targets were set for the most developed regions and those with most heavy industry, including Guangdong, Shanghai, Jiangsu, Zhejiang and Tianjin. China also planned to meet 11.4% of its primary energy requirements from non-fossil sources by 2015.

The plan will also pilot the construction of a number of low-carbon Development Zones and low-carbon residential communities, which it hopes will result in a cluster effect among businesses and consumers.

To facilitate carbon trading and to more broadly help assess emissions targets and meet the transparency requirements of the Paris Agreement, the Plan improved the system for greenhouse gas emissions monitoring. This was the first time that carbon emissions trading had featured in one of China's Five-Year Plans.

The plan also provided for the development of an ultra-high-voltage (UHV) transmission corridor to increase the integration of renewable energy from the point of generation to its point of consumption.

In addition, the Government will in future include data on greenhouse emissions in its official statistics.

=== Carbon trading scheme ===
In a separate development, on January 13, 2012, the National Development and Reform Commission announced that the cities of Beijing, Tianjin, Shanghai, Chongqing and Shenzhen, and the provinces of Hubei and Guangdong would become the first to participate in a pilot carbon cap and trade scheme that would operate in a similar way to the European Union Emission Trading Scheme. The development follows an unsuccessful experiment with voluntary carbon exchanges that was set up in 2009 in Beijing, Shanghai and Tianjin.

== Fossil fuels ==
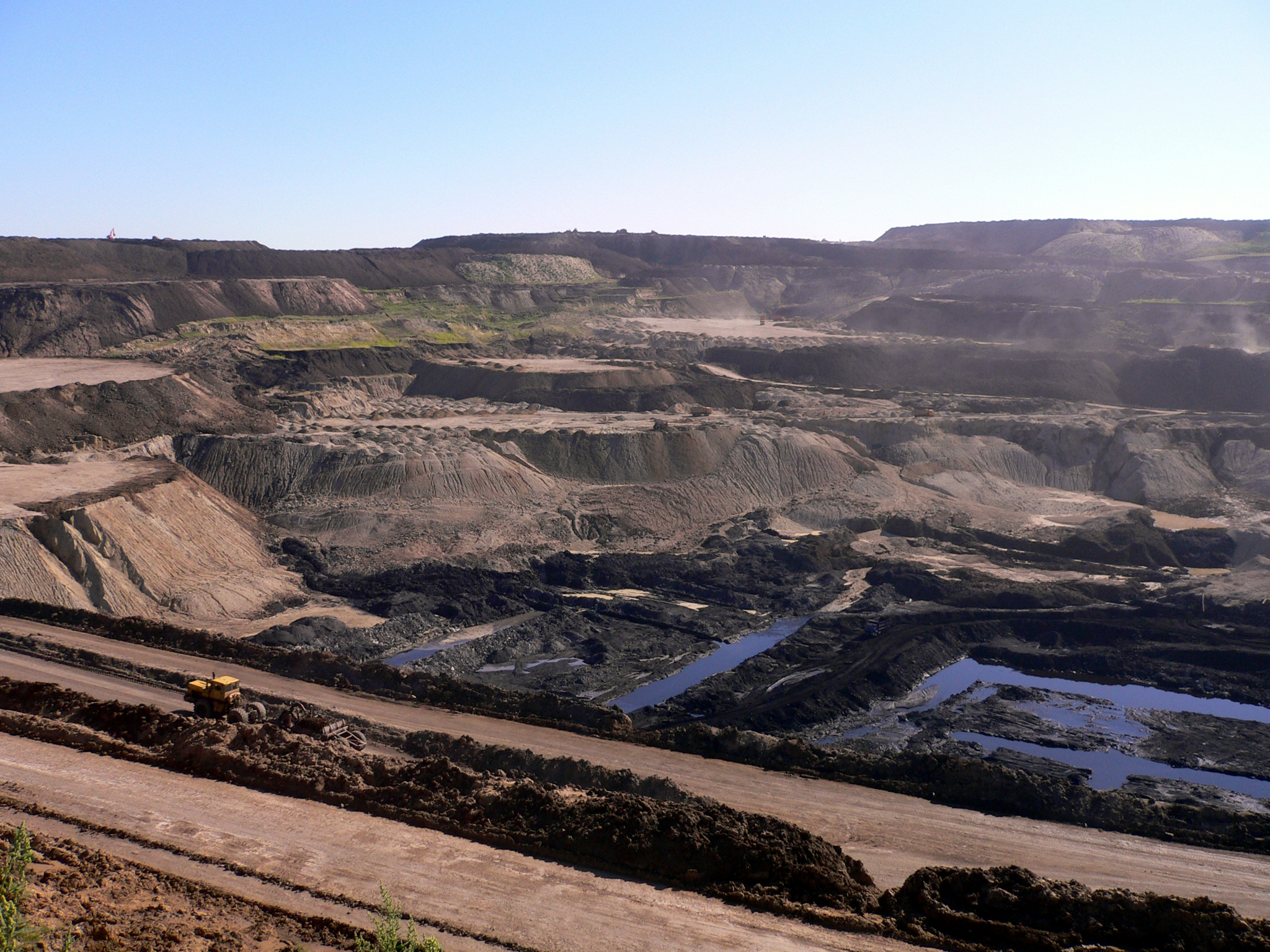
A coal mine near Hailar, Inner Mongolia

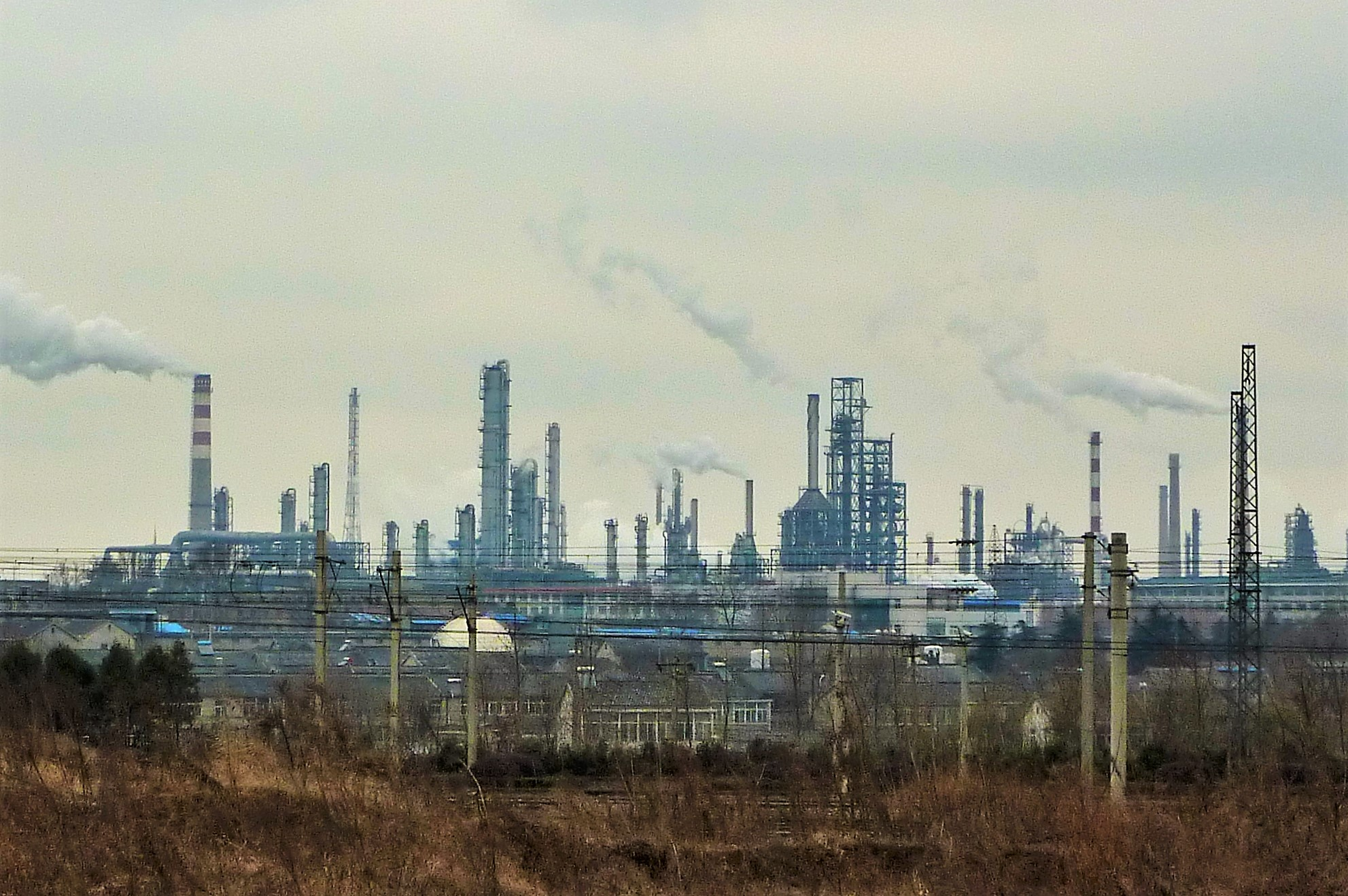
Jinling Oil Refinery, Qixia, Nanjing

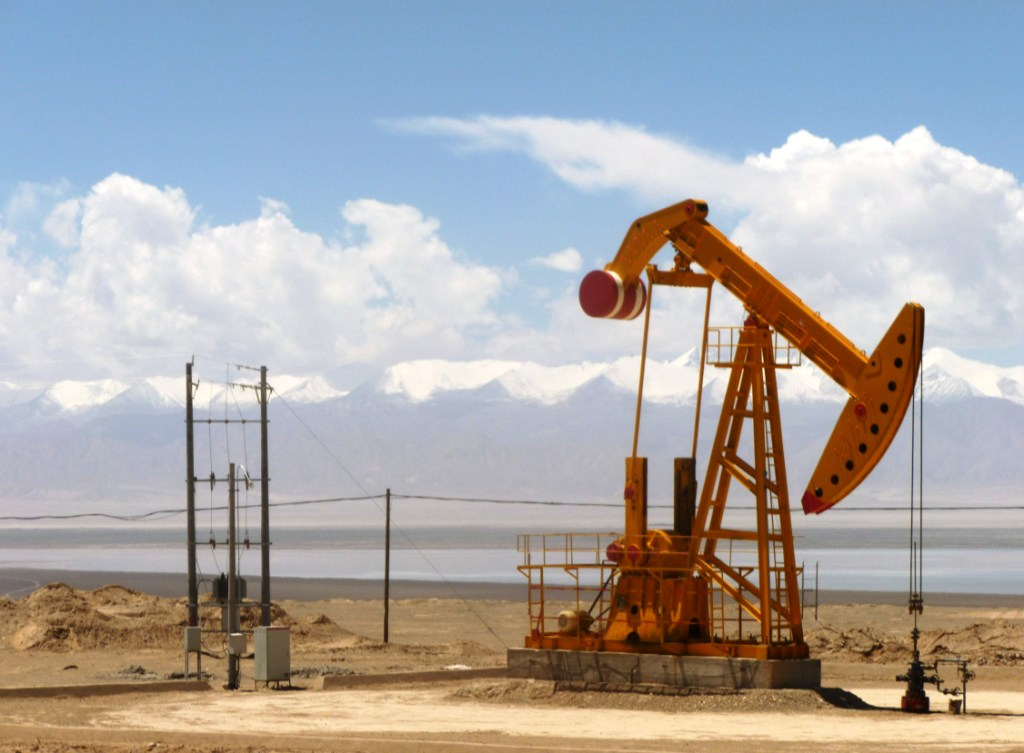
Oil well in Qaidam Basin, Qinghai

=== Coal ===
Coal in China (Mt)
	Production	Net import	Net available
2005	2,226	-47	2,179
2008	2,761	nd	2,761
2009	2,971	114	3,085
2010	3,162	157	3,319
2011	3,576	177	3,753
2015	3,527	199	3,726
Excludes Hong Kong

Coal remained China's largest source of energy in 2025, accounting for 51.4% of total energy consumption, down 1.8 percentage points from 2024. Clean energy sources, including natural gas, hydropower, nuclear, wind and solar, accounted for 30.4%. China produces and consumes more coal than any other country. Analysis in 2016 shows that China's coal consumption appears to have peaked in 2014. According to Global Energy Monitor, China's government has limited the hours of 40% of coal-fired power stations built in 2019, due to overcapacity in electricity generation.

As part of China's efforts to achieve its pledges of peak coal consumption by 2030 and carbon neutrality by 2060, a nationwide effort to reduce overcapacity resulted in the closure of many small and dirty coal mines. Major coal-producing regions like Shaanxi, Inner Mongolia, and Shanxi instituted administrative caps on coal output. These measures contributed to electricity outages in several northeastern provinces in September 2021 and a coal shortage elsewhere in China. The National Development and Reform Commission responded by relaxing some environmental standards and the government allowed coal-fired power plants to defer tax payments. Trade policy was adjusted to permit the importation of a small amount of coal from Australia. The energy problems abated in a few weeks.

In 2023, China accounted for about two-thirds of the global increase in coal capacity, commissioning 47.4 gigawatts (GW) of new coal plants. This level of expansion represents the largest annual increase in coal capacity initiated by any country since 2015.

=== Petroleum ===
China's oil supply was 4,855 TWh in 2009 which represented 10% of the world's supply.

Although China is still a major crude oil producer, it became an oil importer in the 1990s. China became dependent on imported oil for the first time in its history in 1993 due to demand rising faster than domestic production. In 2002, annual crude petroleum production was 1,298,000,000 barrels, and annual crude petroleum consumption was 1,670,000,000 barrels. In 2006, it imported 145 million tons of crude oil, accounting for 47% of its total oil consumption. By 2014 China was importing approximately 7 million barrels of oil per day. Three state-owned oil companies – Sinopec, CNPC, and CNOOC – dominate its domestic market.

China announced on June 20, 2008, plans to raise petrol, diesel and aviation kerosene prices. This decision appeared to reflect a need to reduce the unsustainably high level of subsidies these fuels attract, given the global trend in the price of oil.

=== Natural gas ===
Countries by natural gas proven reserves (2014), based on data from The World Factbook

China's natural gas supply was 1,015 TWh in 2009 that was 3% of the world supply.

CNPC, Sinopec, and CNOOC are all active in the upstream gas sector, as well as in LNG import, and in midstream pipelines. Branch pipelines and urban networks are run by city gas companies including China Gas Holdings, ENN Energy, Towngas China, Beijing Enterprises Holdings and Kunlun Energy.

China was top seventh in natural gas production in 2010.

Issued by China's State Council in September 2013, China's Action Plan for the Prevention and Control of Air Pollution illustrates government desire to increase the share of natural gas in China's energy mix. In May 2014 China signed a 30-year deal with Russia to deliver 38 billion cubic metres of natural gas each year. The Power of Siberia pipeline is designed to reduce China's dependence on coal, which is more carbon intensive and causes more pollution than natural gas. The proposed western gas route from Russia's West Siberian petroleum basin to North-Western China is known as Power of Siberia 2.

In November 2021, U.S. producer Venture Global LNG signed a twenty-year contract with China's state-owned Sinopec to supply liquefied natural gas (LNG). China's imports of U.S. natural gas would more than double.

== Electricity generation ==
By 2025, Asia is projected to account for half of the world's electricity consumption, with one-third of global electricity to be consumed in China.

China depends mainly on fossil fuels for its electricity

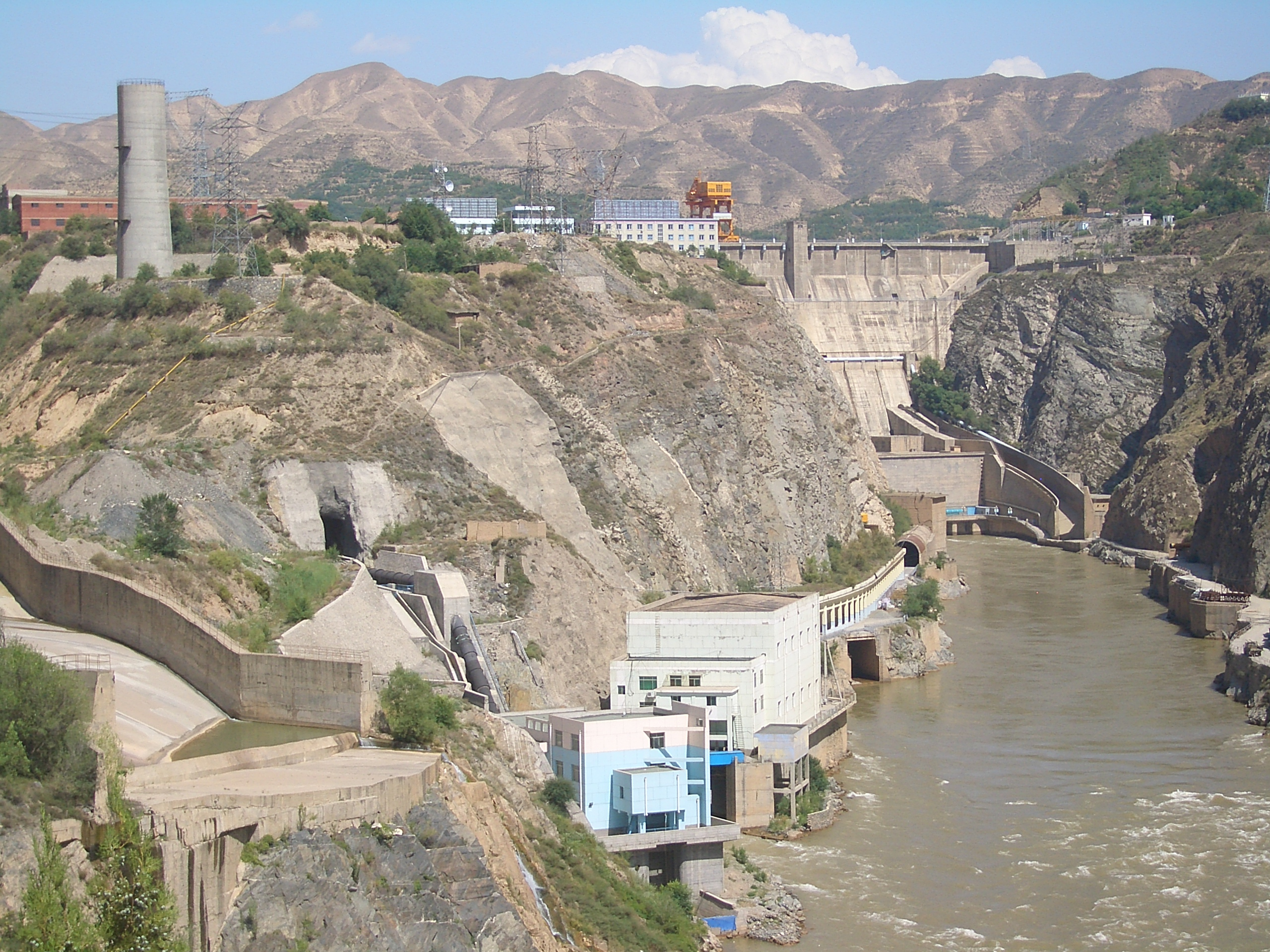
Liujiaxia Dam in Gansu, China.

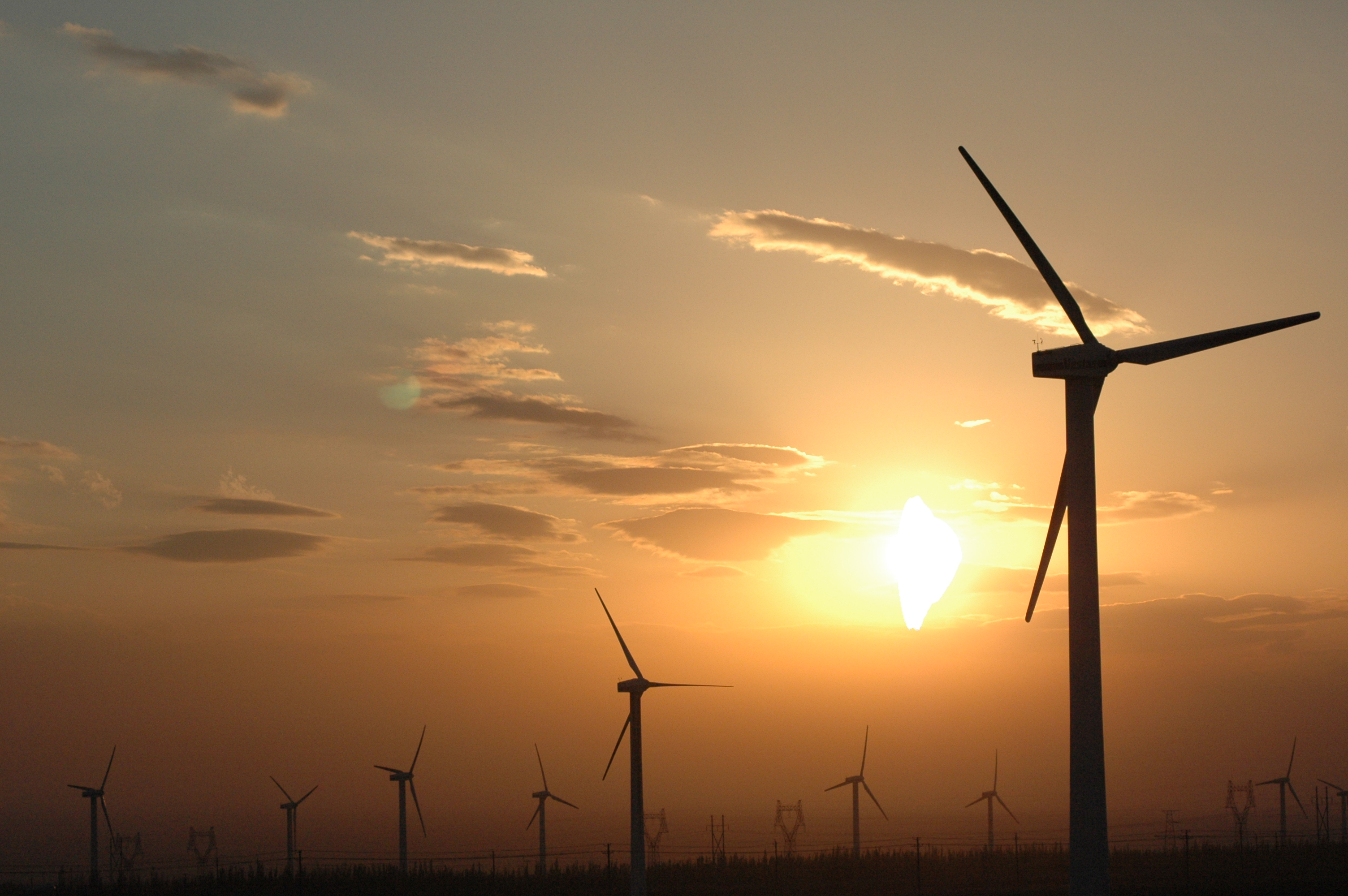
Wind farm in Xinjiang, China

In 2013, China's total annual electricity output was 5.398 trillion kWh and the annual consumption was 5.380 trillion kWh with an installed capacity of 1247 GW (all the largest in the world).

This is an increase from 2009, when China's total annual electricity output was 3.71465 trillion kWh, and the annual consumption was 3.6430 trillion kWh (second largest in the world). In the same year, the total installed electricity generating capacity was 874 GW. China is undertaking substantial long-distance transmission projects with record breaking capacities, and has the goal of achieving an integrated nationwide grid in the period between 2015 and 2020.

=== Coal ===
In 2015, China generated 73% of its electricity from coal-fired power stations, which has been dropping from a peak of 81% in 2007.

In recent years, China has increased its use of coal power and continued to build new coal power plants. The National Energy Administration's early warning risk rating for coal plants approved the establishment of new power plants in 2020. China shut down roughly 7 GW of power plants at the same time, continuing to decommission ageing coal-fired power reactors.

Coal electricity in China (TWh)
	From coal	Total	%
2004	1,713	2,200	78%
2007	2,656	3,279	81%
2008	2,733	3,457	79%
2009	2,913	3,696	79%
2010	3,273	4,208	78%
2011	3,724	4,715	79%
2012	3,850	4,937	78%
2013	4,200	5,398	78%
2014	4,354	5,583	78%
2015	4,115	5,666	73%

In 2024, global coal-power capacity reached a record 2,130 gigawatts, with China initiating 70 gigawatts of new coal plants—nearly 20 times more than the rest of the world combined. This expansion led to a 2% increase in the world's coal fleet, primarily to enhance China's energy security. Despite a global shift away from coal, this rise underscores potential conflicts with China's climate goals. Additionally, coal capacity also grew in Indonesia and India, marking the first global increase outside China since 2019.

=== Renewables ===
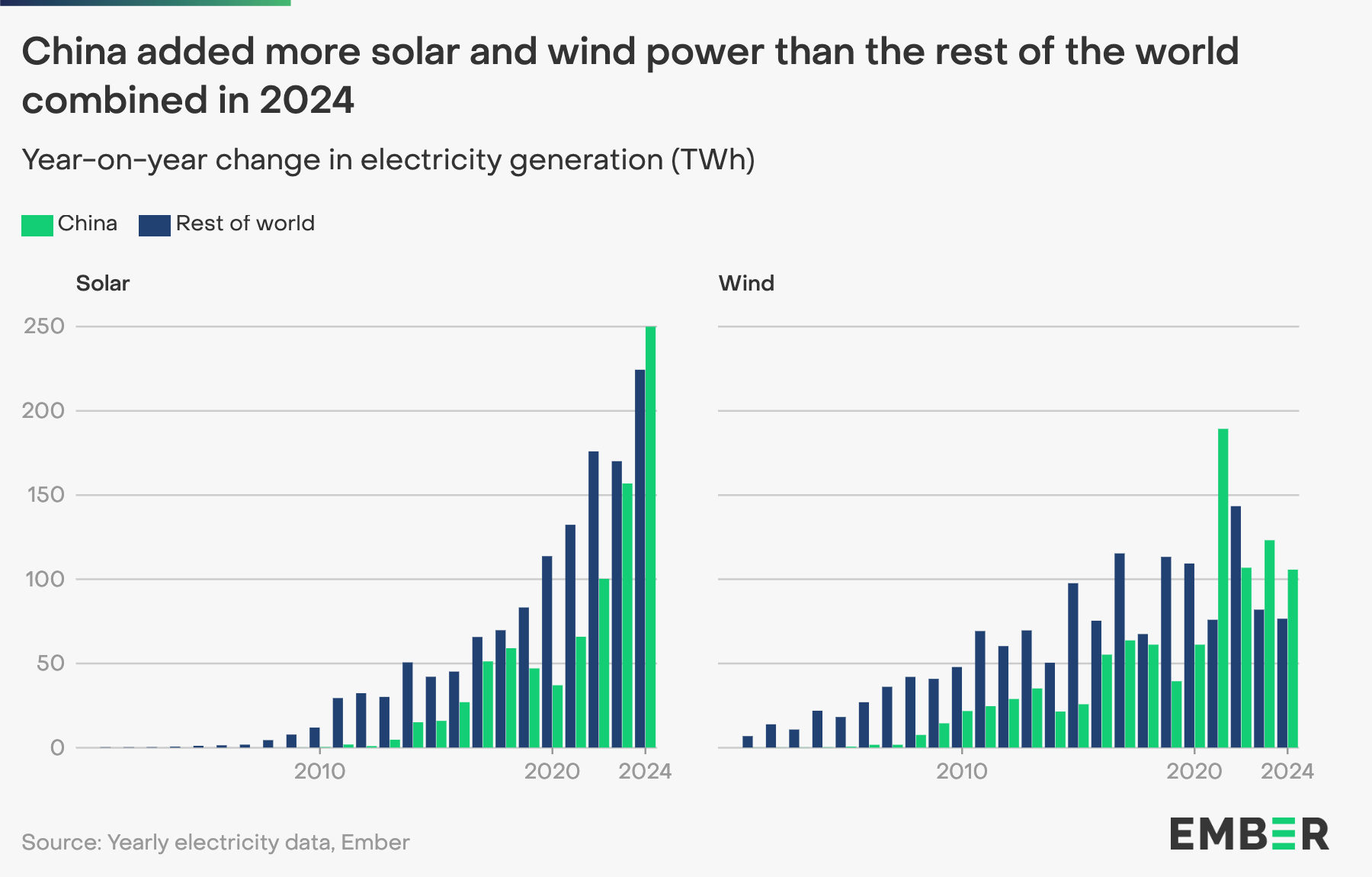
China added more solar and wind power than the rest of the world combined in 2024.

China is the world's leading renewable energy producer, with an installed capacity of 152 GW. China has been investing heavily in the renewable energy field in recent years. In 2007, the total renewable energy investment was US$12 billion, second only to Germany. In 2012, China invested US$65.1 billion in clean energy (20% more than in 2011), fully 30% of the total investment by the G-20, including 25% (US$31.2 billion) of global solar energy investment, 37% percent (US$27.2 billion) of global wind energy investment, and 47% (US$6.3 billion) of global investment in "other renewable energy" (small hydro, geothermal, marine, and biomass); 23 GW of clean generation capacity was installed.

Approximately 7% of China's energy was from renewable sources in 2006, a figure targeted to rise to 10% by 2010 and to 16% by 2020. The major renewable energy source in China is hydropower. Total hydro-electric output in China in 2009 was 615.64 TWh, constituting 16.6% of all electricity generated. The country already has the most hydro-electric capacity in the world, and the Three Gorges Dam is currently the largest hydro-electric power station in the world, with a total capacity of 22.5 GW. It has been in full operation since 2012.

China is the largest producer of wind turbines and solar panels.

=== Nuclear power ===
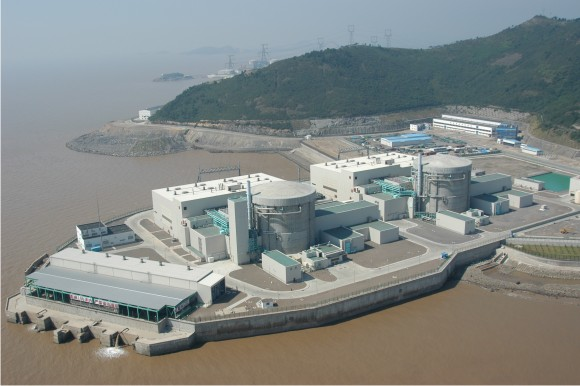
Qinshan Nuclear Power Plant, located in Zhejiang China

In 1991, China's first nuclear power plant became operational. As of 2020, it had 49 operational reactors, China, 41 additional nuclear reactors planned, and 168 proposed reactors under consideration.

As of at least 2023, China's goals for nuclear power expansion are the most ambitious of any country.

China's domestic market for uranium is highly concentrated because Chinese policy identifies uranium as a strategic resource and only select companies are authorized to mine it. The country's civilian nuclear industry and its mining are industry are largely concentrated in China General Nuclear Power Group and China National Nuclear Corporation, two state-owned enterprise that report to the State Council.

=== Rural electrification ===
Following the completion of the similar Township Electrification Program in 2005, the Village Electrification Program plans to provide renewable electricity to 3.5 million households in 10,000 villages by 2010. This is to be followed by full rural electrification using renewable energy by 2015.

=== Large-scale transmission projects ===
In 2015, State Grid Corporation of China proposed the Global Energy Interconnection, a long-term proposal to develop globally integrated smart grids and ultra high voltage transmission networks to connect over 80 countries. The idea is supported by CCP general secretary Xi Jinping and his administration in attempting to develop support in various internal forums, including UN bodies.

== Renewable energy sources ==
Although a majority of the renewable energy in China is from hydropower, other renewable energy sources are in rapid development. In 2006, a total of 10 billion US dollars had been invested in renewable energy, second only to Germany.

China is a major source of clean energy technology transfer to other developing countries. Approximately 54% of the Belt and Road Initiative's energy projects are in clean energy or alternative energy sectors.

China implemented its first renewable energy law over 2005-2006, expanding the market for renewable technology.

During 2009 and 2010, China adopted policy measures to stimulate demand for new energy vehicles in both the public and private sectors.

=== Bioenergy ===
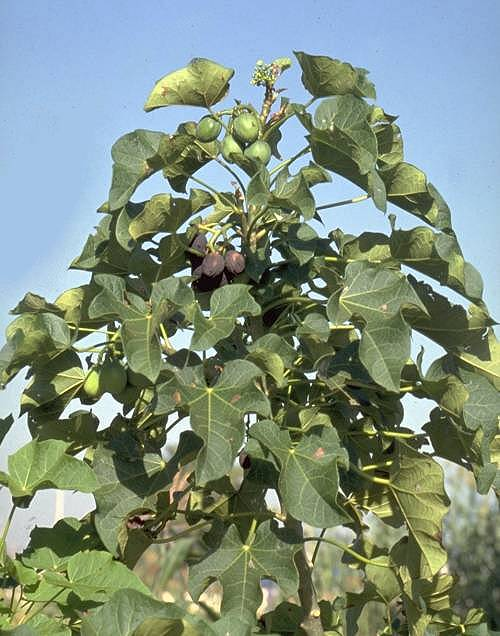
Jatropha curcas is to be grown for biofuel production

In 2006, 16 million tons of corn were used to produce a first generation biofuel (ethanol). However, because food prices in China rose sharply during 2007, China has decided to ban the further expansion of the corn ethanol industry.

On February 7, a spokesman for the State Forestry Administration announced that 130,000 square kilometres (50,000 sq mi) would be devoted to biofuel production. Under an agreement reached with PetroChina in January 2007, 400 square kilometres of Jatropha curcas is to be grown for biodiesel production. Local governments are also developing oilseed projects. There were concerns that such developments may lead to environmental damage.

In 2018, The Telegraph reported that the biofuel industry was further on the rise. There was also considerable interest in biofuels (for example biodiesel, green jet fuel) which use waste material as the input source (second generation biofuel).

=== Solar power ===
China has become the world's largest consumer of solar energy. It is the largest producer of solar water heaters, accounting for 60 percent of the world's solar water heating capacity, and the total installed heaters is estimated at 30 million households. Solar photovoltaic (solar PV) production in China is also in rapid development. In 2007, 0.82 GW of solar PV was produced, second only to Japan.

China's Sixth Five-Year Plan (1981–1985) was the first to address government policy support for solar PV panel manufacturing. Policy support for solar panel manufacturing has been a part of every Five-Year Plan since.

As part of the stimulus plan of "Golden Sun", announced by the government in 2009, several developments and projects became part of the milestones for the development of solar technology in China. These include the agreement signed by LDK for a 500 MW solar project, a new thin film solar plant developed by Anwell Technologies in Henan province using its own proprietary solar technology and the solar power plant project in a desert, headed by First Solar and Ordos City. The effort to drive the renewable energy use in China was further assured after the speech by the Chinese leader, given at the UN climate summit on 22 September 2009 in New York, pledging that China would plan to have 15% of its energy from renewable sources by 2019. China is using solar power in houses, buildings, and cars.

Because solar works well as a distributed power source, recent Chinese policies have focused on increasing the prevalence of distributed solar energy and for developing systems so that electricity from solar energy can be used at its point of generation instead of being transmitted over long distances.

=== Wind power ===
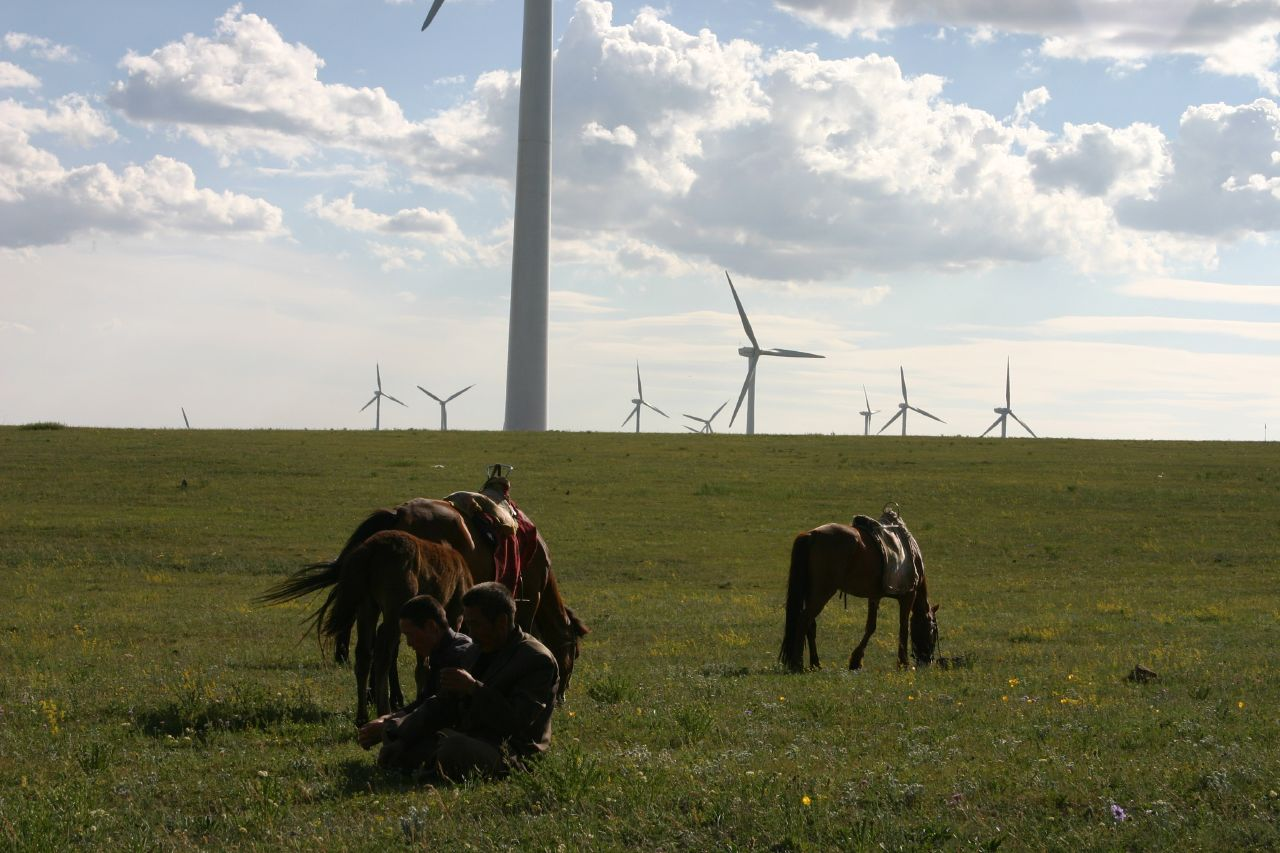
Huitengxile wind farm, Inner Mongolia, China

China's total wind power capacity reached 2.67 gigawatts (GW) in 2006 and 44.7 GW by 2010. This figure reached 281 GW in 2020, an increase of 71.6 GW on the previous year.

== Energy conservation ==
=== General work plan ===
Officials were warned that violating energy conservation and environmental protection laws would lead to criminal proceedings, while failure to achieve targets would be taken into account in the performance assessment of officials and business leaders.

After achieving less than half the 4% reduction in energy intensity targeted for 2006, all companies and local and national government were asked to submit detailed plans for compliance before June 30, 2007.

During the first four years of the plan, energy intensity improved by 14.4%, but dropped sharply in the first quarter of 2010. In August 2010, China announced the closing of 2,087 steel mills, cement works and other energy-intensive factories by September 30, 2010. The factory closings were made more palatable by a labor shortage in much of China making it easier for workers to find other jobs.

=== Space heating and air conditioning ===
A State Council circular issued on June 3, 2007, restricts the temperature of air conditioning in public buildings to no lower than 26 °C in summer (78.8 °F), and of heating to no higher than 20 °C (68 °F) in winter. The sale of inefficient air conditioning units has also been outlawed.

== Public opinion ==
The Chinese results from the 1st Annual World Environment Review, published on June 5, 2007, revealed that, in a sample of 1024 people (50% male):

- 88% are concerned about climate change.
- 97% think their government should do more to tackle global warming.
- 63% think that China is too dependent on fossil fuels.
- 56% think that China is too reliant on foreign oil.
- 91% think that a minimum 25% of electricity should be generated from renewable energy sources.
- 61% are concerned about nuclear power.
- 79% are concerned about carbon dioxide emissions from developing countries.
- 62% think it appropriate for developed countries to demand restrictions on carbon dioxide emissions from developing countries.

Another survey published in August 2007 by China Youth Daily and the British Council sampled 2,500 Chinese people with an average age of 30.1. It showed that 80% of young Chinese are concerned about global warming.

== See also ==
- Climate change in China
- China Energy Conservation Investment Corporation
- Environment of China
- Electricity sector in China
- List of power stations in China
- Pollution in China
- Renewable energy in China
  - Wind power in China
  - Solar power in China
- Nuclear power in China
- Economics of nuclear power plants
- List of countries by energy consumption and production
- World energy consumption
- World energy supply and consumption
- List of countries by total primary energy consumption and production
- List of countries by oil consumption
- List of countries by natural gas consumption
- List of countries by coal production
- List of countries by electricity production
- List of countries by electricity consumption
- Category:Energy by country
