= Field service center =

A Field service center is a centralized location for a variety of USDA agency field offices. These have been reduced in number from about 3,700 to about 2,600 through closures and consolidations initiated as part of a USDA reorganization and streamlining effort mandated by the Department of Agriculture Reorganization Act of 1994 (P.L. 103-354). The centers are intended to provide one-stop shopping for clients of the Farm Service Agency, the Natural Resources Conservation Service, and USDA’s rural development agencies.
