= China Township =

China Township may refer to the following places in the United States:

- China Township, Lee County, Illinois
- China Township, Michigan
- East China Township, Michigan

== See also ==
- China Township Electrification Program, a rural electrification program in several Chinese provinces
