= Noninsured Assistance Program =

In United States agricultural law, producers who grow a crop that is not eligible for crop insurance may be eligible for a direct payment under the Farm Service Agency’s Noninsured Crop Disaster Assistance Program (NAP). NAP has permanent authority under the Federal Crop Insurance Reform Act of 1994, (P.L. 103-354, as amended).

To be eligible for a NAP payment, a producer first must apply for coverage under the program by the application closing date, which varies by crop, but is generally about 30 days prior to the final planting date for an annual crop. Like catastrophic crop insurance, NAP applicants also must pay a $100 per crop service fee at the time of application. In order to receive a NAP payment, a producer must experience at least a 50% crop loss caused by a natural disaster, or be prevented from planting more than 35% of intended crop acreage. For any losses in excess of the minimum loss threshold, a producer can receive 55% of the average market price for the covered commodity. Hence, NAP is similar to catastrophic crop insurance coverage in that it pays 55% of the market price for losses in excess of 50% of normal historic production. A producer of a noninsured crop is subject to a payment limit of $100,000 per person and is ineligible for a payment if the producer's qualifying gross revenues exceed $2 million.

== See also ==
- Agriculture in the United States
