= Federal Crop Insurance Fund =

USDA insurance fund

The Federal Crop Insurance Fund is the fund within USDA through which all mandatory expenses of the federal crop insurance program (i.e., premium subsidy, program losses, and the reimbursement to participating private insurance companies for their administrative and operating expenses) are funded. Each budget cycle, USDA estimates the amount required to fund the program, but the fund receives an annual appropriation of “such sums as are necessary”, since program expenses particularly program losses are contingent on weather and other variables, thus making it difficult to budget in advance.
