= Group Risk Income Protection =

In United States agricultural policy, Group Risk Income Protection (GRIP) is a county-based revenue insurance program that is a variation of Group Risk Protection (GRP). GRIP pays a participating producer when the county revenue per acre for an insured crop falls below a trigger revenue selected by the insured producer, regardless of the actual revenue level of the individual producer. It is available on a limited basis where GRP is currently available.
