= MPCI =

MPCI can refer to:

- Patriotic Movement of Côte d'Ivoire
- Mini PCI
- MPCi, a Chinese venture capital firm
- Multi-peril crop insurance
