= Federal Crop Insurance Corporation =

United States government corporation

Agency overview
- Formed: February 16, 1938; 88 years ago
- Parent department: Risk Management Agency, United States Department of Agriculture
- Website: www.rma.usda.gov/about-rma/fcic

The Federal Crop Insurance Corporation (FCIC) is a wholly owned government corporation managed by the Risk Management Agency of the United States Department of Agriculture. FCIC manages the federal crop insurance program, which provides U.S. farmers and agricultural entities with crop insurance protection.

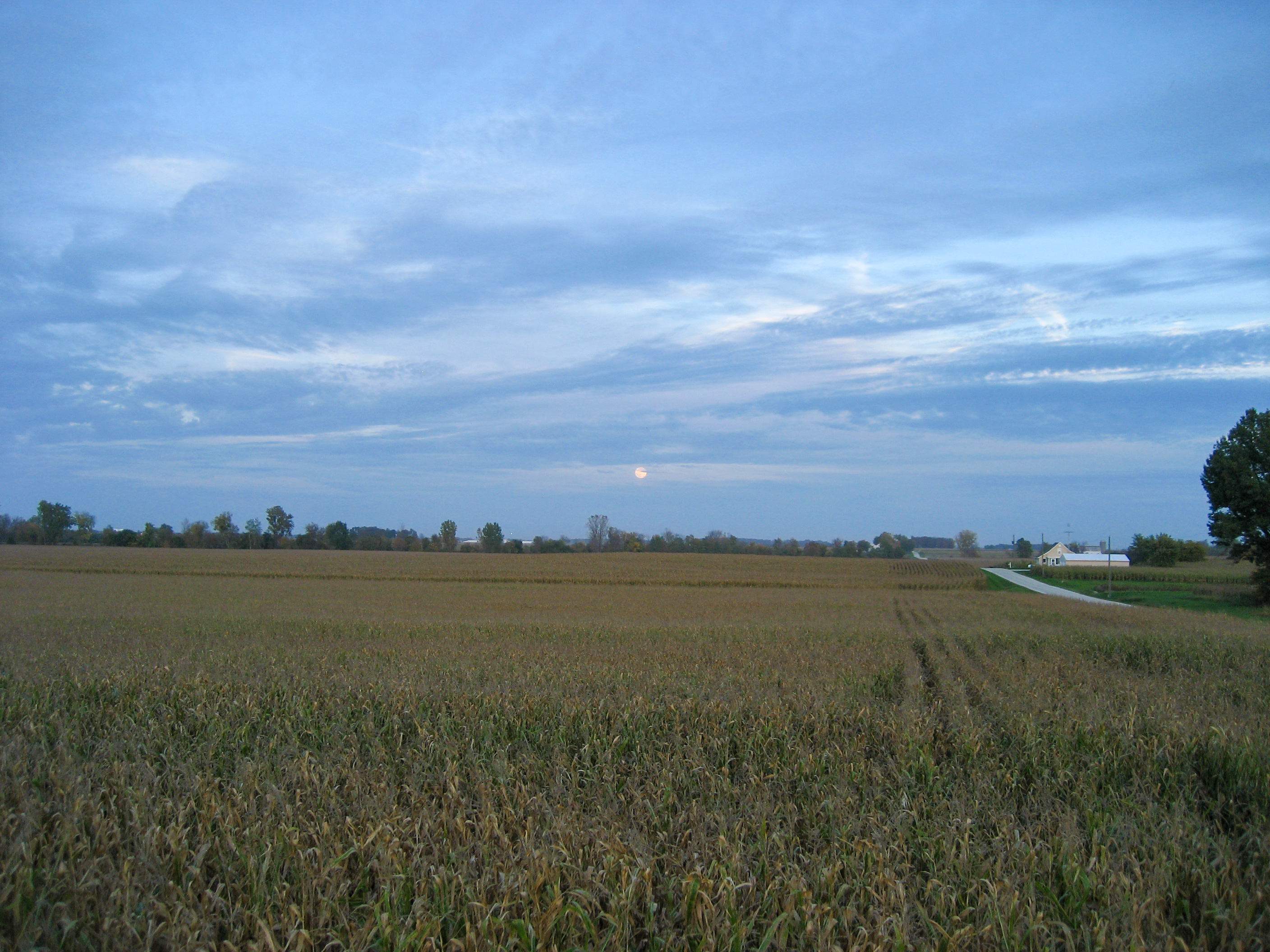
Corn crops bordering the Wabash River

== Background ==
During the 1930s, farmers thought they were safe during the Great Depression because they could provide food for themselves. That changed quickly when the Dust Bowl drought made it difficult for farmers to produce any crops during this time. By not being able to produce these essential crops, they lacked necessary food for themselves and were unable to make money off of the crops. In order to help America recover from the Great Depression, President Franklin D. Roosevelt started the New Deal, which was a plan compiled of federal programs, including several focused on farming.

== History ==
The Federal Crop Insurance Corporation was a program created to carry out the government initiative to provide insurance for farmers' produce, which means that farmers would receive compensation for crops, even if they were not sustained in that year.

On September 26, 1980, the program was expanded through Public Law 96-365.

Initially, participation in FCIC was voluntary. However, insurance premiums were subsidized by the U.S. government as a means of encouraging participation in the FCIC program. This changed with the Federal Crop Insurance Reform Act of 1994, which required farmers to participate in the program in order to be eligible for deficiency payments related to certain FCIC programs. During the mandatory participation Catastrophic coverage was created. "Catastrophic coverage compensated farmers for losses exceeding 50 percent of an average yield paid at 60 percent of the price established for the crop for that year." Mandatory participation was repealed in 1996, but for the farmers who had accepted other benefits it was mandatory to obtain crop insurance, or they would surrender the eligibility for any benefits that were caused by disaster.

An independent office designed to supervise and monitor FCIC activities was mandated in the Federal Agriculture Improvement and Reform Act of 1996 (P.L.104-127). The Agriculture Risk Protection Act of 2000 (ARPA) made amendments, providing for FCIC to offer a wider selection of insurance-related risk management tools to farmers and agricultural entities.

=== Financial claims ===
Between 1980 and 2005, FCIC recorded $43.6 billion in total claims, averaging approximately $1.7 billion in losses per year. Three-quarters of FCIC claims were the result of three weather-related disasters – drought, excess moisture, and hail – with the remaining claims divided among 27 different causes, including crop-damaging frost and tornados.

=== Biotech coverage expansion ===
In September 2008, the U.S. Department of Agriculture approved the expansion of the FCIC's risk management program to include agricultural producers involved in the planting and harvesting of certain biotech corn hybrid seeds that are designed to be resistant to damage from lepidoptera pests (including moths and their larvae) and below-ground corn rootworm damage. The biotech corn hybrid seeds must also show tolerance to certain herbicides. FCIC coverage for the biotech corn hybrid seeds went into effect in 2009.

== Standard Reinsurance Agreement ==
The United States Department of Agriculture allows private insurance companies that participate in the federal crop insurance program to transfer a portion of their risk to the federal government. The standard reinsurance agreement establishes the terms and conditions under which the United States federal government will provide subsidies and reinsurance on eligible crop insurance contracts sold or reinsured by the insurance company named on the agreement.

== See also ==
- Actual Production History
