= Group Risk Protection =

Group Risk Protection (GRP) is a form of crop insurance available in certain parts of the United States.

GRP makes an indemnity payment to all participating crop farmers when the entire county's crop production is a certain percentage below the normal production level of the county. This differs from the basic crop insurance program that makes payments to participating farmers when the individual farmer's own crop yield is less than the producer's normal yield.
