= Catastrophic crop insurance =

Catastrophic crop insurance (CAT) is a component of the U.S. federal crop insurance program, originally authorized by the Federal Crop Insurance Reform Act of 1994 (P.L. 103- 354). CAT coverage compensates farmers for crop yield losses exceeding 50% of their average historical yield at a payment rate of 55% of the projected season average market price. CAT coverage requires that a farmer realize a yield loss of more than 50% and only makes payments on losses exceeding the 50% threshold. Producers pay no premium for CAT coverage, but except for cases of financial hardship, must pay an administrative fee of $300 per crop. A producer has the ability to purchase additional insurance coverage (or buy-up coverage) beyond CAT coverage, but must pay a premium, partially subsidized by the government.
