= Grain yield monitor =

The combine grain yield monitor is a device coupled with other sensors to calculate and record the crop yield or grain yield as a modern-day combine harvester operates. Yield monitors are a part of the precision agriculture products available to producers today that provide producers with the tools to reduce costs, increase yields, and increase efficiency. The present day grain yield monitor is designed to measure the harvested grain mass flow, moisture content, and speed to determine total grain harvested. In most cases today this is coupled with global positioning system to record yield and other spatially variable information across a field. This allows for the creation of a grain yield map which provides information on spatial variability and supports management decisions for producers.

== Grain flow measurement ==
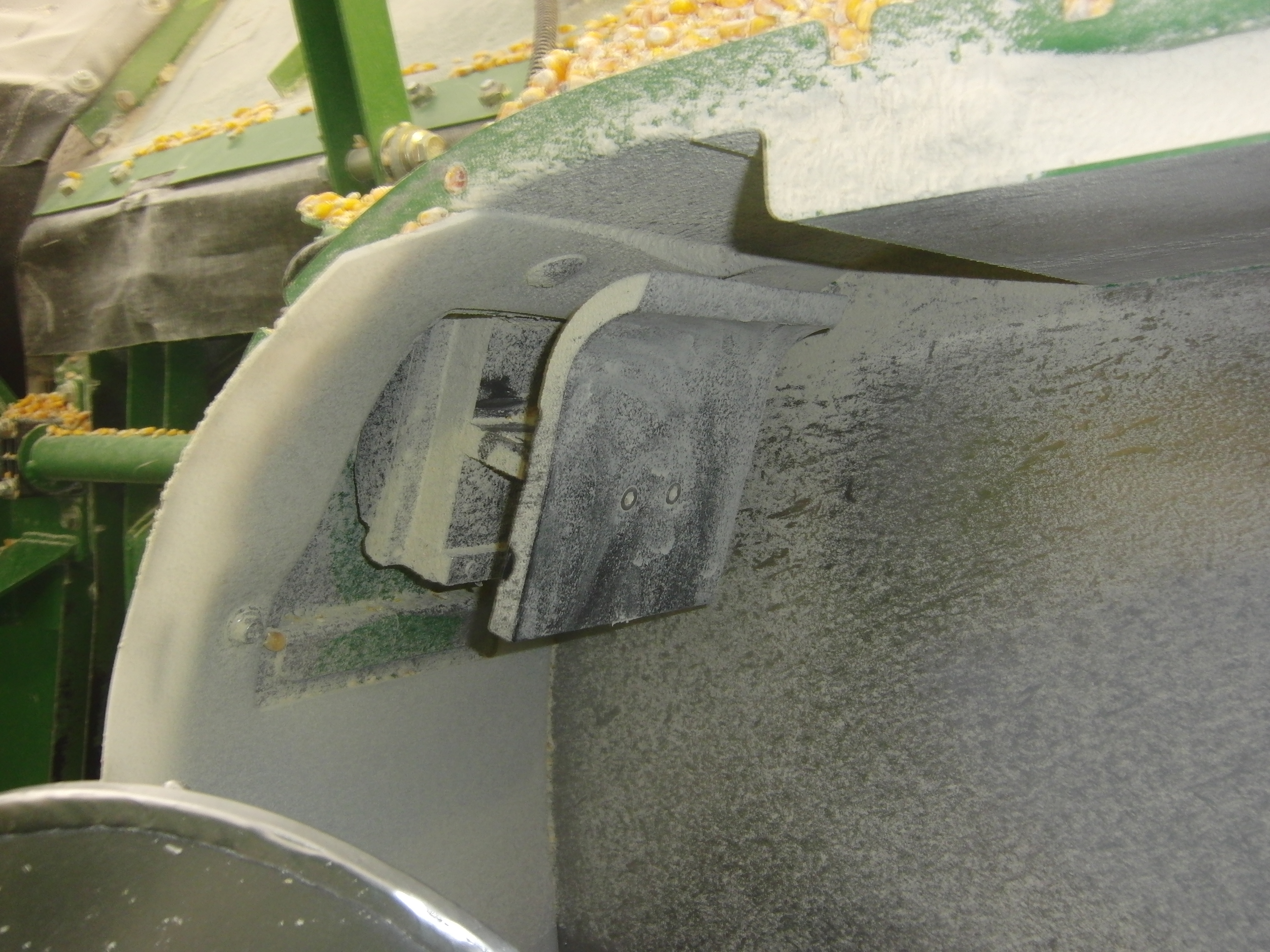
Impact based mass flow meter located at the top of the clean grain elevator

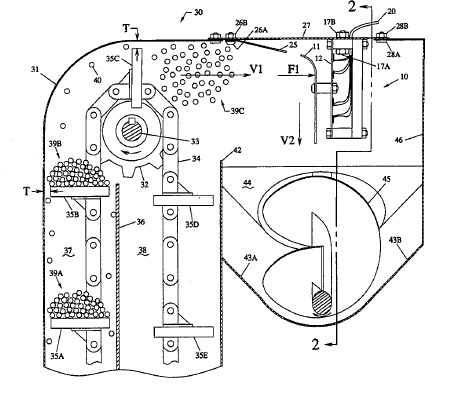
Ag Leader impact based mass flow sensor and clean grain elevator.

=== Impact based mass flow measurement ===
Grain mass flow is most commonly measured using a load cell with an impact plate attached to the load cell located at the top of the clean grain elevator. As the clean grain elevator paddles rotate around the top of the clean grain elevator, the grain is expelled from the elevator by centrifugal force and makes contact with the impact plate attached to the load cell. The force applied by the grain is converted to an electrical signal by the load cell that is used to estimate the mass flow of the grain. A calibration of the sensor to develop a relationship of the amplitude of the electrical signal to grain mass flow and is calibrated on a harvester specific basis with the grain mass reported on a wet basis. This technology was developed and first commercialized by Ag Leader Technology. The clean grain elevator speed is also measured and used in the calibration from electrical signal to mass flow as the elevator has a direct impact on the amount of force applied to the impact plate and load cell. This is the most common method for measuring grain flow in harvesters today and exists in different variations.

Impact based mass flow sensor operating in corn

==== Accuracy and calibration ====
The grain mass flow sensor must be calibrated to provide an accurate estimation of grain flow from the electrical signal produced by the load cell. Different models of the grain mass flow sensor use different methods of calibration, with some being as simple as a linear single point calibration. Improvements in this area have resulted in the use of multi-point calibration to provide a more accurate characterization of the load cell response.

The calibration process entails harvesting consistent crop at a constant speed to produce a consistent grain mass flow rate to the mass flow sensor. A calibration is started through the yield monitor installed on the harvester and the operator begins harvesting grain. Once the recommended amount of grain harvested per the manufacturer's recommendations has been harvested, the grain is offloaded into a grain holding device equipped with an accurate scale to measure the actual weight of the grain harvested. This grain weight is then entered back into the yield monitor and is used to adjust the calibration that relates the electrical signal of the load cell to grain mass flow.

Several factors affect the accuracy of the calibration beyond the calibration itself. Build up of material on the impact plate can cause the load cell response to be dampened to impacting grain, reducing the load cell response. Wear on the impact plate can also cause reduction in accuracy of a calibration. The chain tension of the clean grain elevator affects the velocity at which grain is expelled from the elevator which changes the force that is applied at the impact plate. Manufacturers often advise properly tensioning the clean grain elevator before calibrating the grain yield monitor. Excessive wear of the clean grain elevator paddles over time will also affect the mass flow calibration. Some harvesters use a solid plastic paddle over a rubber paddle for better consistency over time as worn paddles change the grain trajectory as it leaves the elevator changing the location the grain contacts the impact plate.

Harvesting on slopes decreases the accuracy of the mass flow sensing system in most cases. Due to different variations in impact plate placement by different manufacturers, the change in response from pitch and roll angles may differ slightly. In cases which the impact plate is located similar to that seen in the "Impact based mass flow sensor and clean grain elevator" image, if the machine is pitched forward the mass flow will increase as gravity will aid in applying additional force to the mass flow sensor. When the harvester is pitched aft, the sensor response is reduced as gravity reduces the amount of force applied to the mass flow sensor. Roll causes similar error but of a smaller magnitude to that of the pitch of the harvester.

=== Alternative measurements ===
==== Radiometric ====
Gamma ray transmission rates are measured through the grain flow at the top of the clean grain elevator with a detector on the opposite side of the grain flow. Radiation absorption is proportional to the grain flow. This sensing method provides high accuracy to within 2% when calibrated, but exposes operators to possible radiation exposure.

==== Photoelectric sensing ====
A light emission source coupled with a receptor is placed opposite of each other at the top of the clean grain elevator. The magnitude of signal of the light receptor is used to determine the flow rate of the grain. The measurements need to be timed with the clean grain elevator paddles so measurements are taken of the grain only. Difficulties of this system are lower accuracy at higher grain flow rates and uneven loading of the elevator paddles.

== Moisture measurement ==
Grain moisture content at harvesting is an important piece of the yield monitoring process. It is used in many cases, dependent upon manufacturer, in the grain mass flow sensor calibration and provides producers with additional information about spatial variability within a field. Grain moisture is sensed by measuring the capacitance of the grain by passing a known grain volume between two electrically conductive plates. Typically this sensor is mounted on the clean grain elevator and a sample metered into the sensor and back into the clean grain elevator after it has been processed. This sensor orientation allows for sampling grain moisture throughout a field during harvest operations.

== Grain yield measurement ==
Measurement of grain yield comes from the measured grain mass flow, the harvester speed, and header width. Grain moisture as determined by the moisture sensor or by operator input into the yield monitor can also be included to estimate dry grain mass. In the United States the grain yield is typically reported as bushels per acre. SI units for grain yield measurement are typically reported as tonnes per hectare or in few cases m^{3}. The harvester speed can be obtained by ground speed measurement from measuring the wheel speed of the harvester, radar mounted on the harvester, or by GPS. The head, as it is referred to is the device mounted on the front of the harvester by which the crop is gathered into the harvester. The width of the head is determined by the effective width of crop that can be harvested as the combine moves in the forward direction.

Variable	SI Units	Imperial	Description
$\dot{m}$	kg/s	lbs/s	Grain Mass Flow
$v$	$\tfrac{kilometer}{hr}$	$\tfrac{mile}{hr}$	Harvester Velocity
$w$	m	ft	Head width
Yield	$\tfrac{tonne}{ha}$	$\tfrac{bu}{acre}$	Grain yield as most commonly reported

Grain Yield as calculated for corn at 56 lb/bu in imperial units.

$Yield=\dfrac{\dot{m}*\dfrac{bu}{56 lb}*\dfrac{3600 s}{hr}}{w*v*\dfrac{5280 ft}{mi}*\dfrac{acre}{43560 ft^2}}$

Grain Yield as calculated in SI units.

$Yield=\dfrac{\dot{m}*\dfrac{tonne}{1,000 kg}*\dfrac{3600 s}{hr}}{w*v*\dfrac{1000 m}{km}*\dfrac{ha}{10,000 m^2}}$

== Yield monitor ==
The yield monitor is the device that records the data that determines the grain yield and the grain yield itself. Today's yield monitors provide operators with a user interface that displays the grain yield, grain moisture, and a color coded spatial map that displays the grain yield of the harvested portions of the field. The operator can enter additional information to separate and identify yield data from different fields and farms. Yield data can be downloaded from a yield monitor via the memory storage method used per the manufacturer and loaded into a spatial data management system. These software packages allow for viewing of the yield maps and completing other analysis of the data.

=== Yield map ===
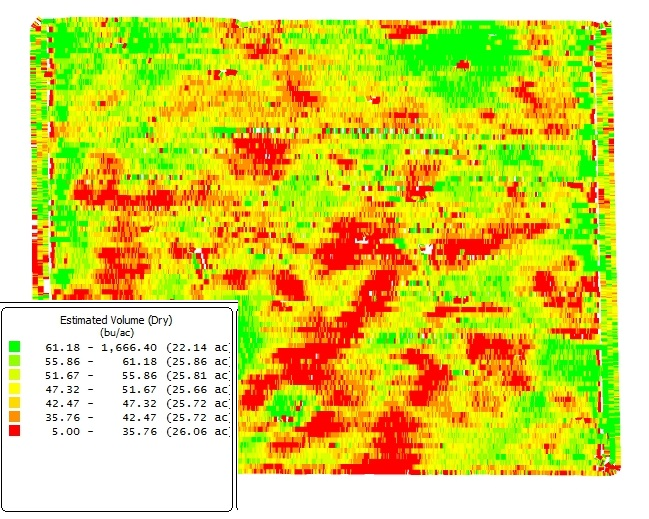
Soybean field yield map

Grain yield maps can be displayed on a yield monitor or via a spatial data management software such as SMS or Apex. Yield maps are used in management decisions such as fertilizer application rates and seeding population rates in support of site specific farming. Yield maps are also utilized for making decisions on best management practices in terms of comparing crop varieties, fertilizer types and application rates, and pesticide application. These other precision agriculture practices can be recorded as spatial maps and overlaid with grain yield maps for further analysis and decision making.

Grain yield monitors have been in production since yield monitors were introduced in the early 1990s and have been progressively updated with better hardware that provides the harvester operator with a better user interface and makes the logged data information more readily available. These monitors are typically referred to as displays in reference to their purpose in many cases is to display the yield information in a spatial color coded map.

== Variability of the grain yield monitor ==
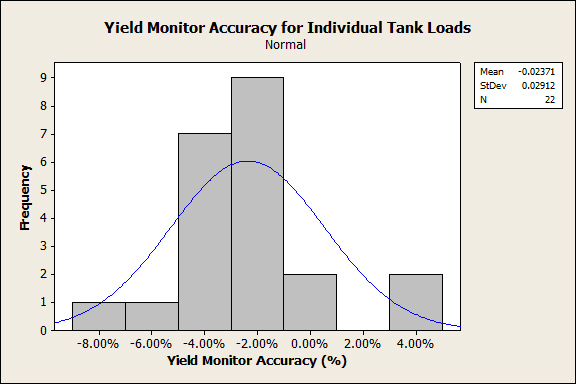
Distribution of grain yield monitor accuracy for multiple loads

The grain yield monitor is an excellent tool that provides producers an effective evaluation tool on a field and farm basis. The accuracy of the yield monitor is approximately 1-3% when properly calibrated, but is on an averaging basis for this accuracy. On a pass to pass basis the accuracy decreases significantly with a range of accuracy of 0-10% error in most studies. The average of multiple loads remains within the projected 1-3%, but individual loads have a much higher variability. These errors are present from issues listed in the "Impact Based Mass Flow Measurement" section of this page. The effects of individual load variability limits its ability to be used for smaller scale comparison such as test plot comparisons. Test plots are usually single planted strips of a single crop hybrid at approximately the width of the combine harvester head. Harvesting a test plot results in single harvested load and yield estimation for the single hybrid. Comparing one hybrid to another based on single loads can be difficult as the load is essentially a sub sample of a larger mean.
