= Buy-up coverage =

Aspect of crop insurance coverage

Buy-up coverage is the portion of crop insurance coverage for which a participating farmer in the US pays a premium. During the 2000s, the system offered catastrophic (CAT) crop insurance coverage without any premium payments required of the farmer. Any coverage purchased above the CAT level was referred to as buy-up coverage, and was partially subsidized by the US federal government.

The Agricultural Act of 2014 adjusted buy-up coverage limits and premium payments, along with buyers' costs, as part of a shift away from direct subsidies.
