= Beardslee Castle =

Coordinates: 43°0′26″N 74°44′42″W

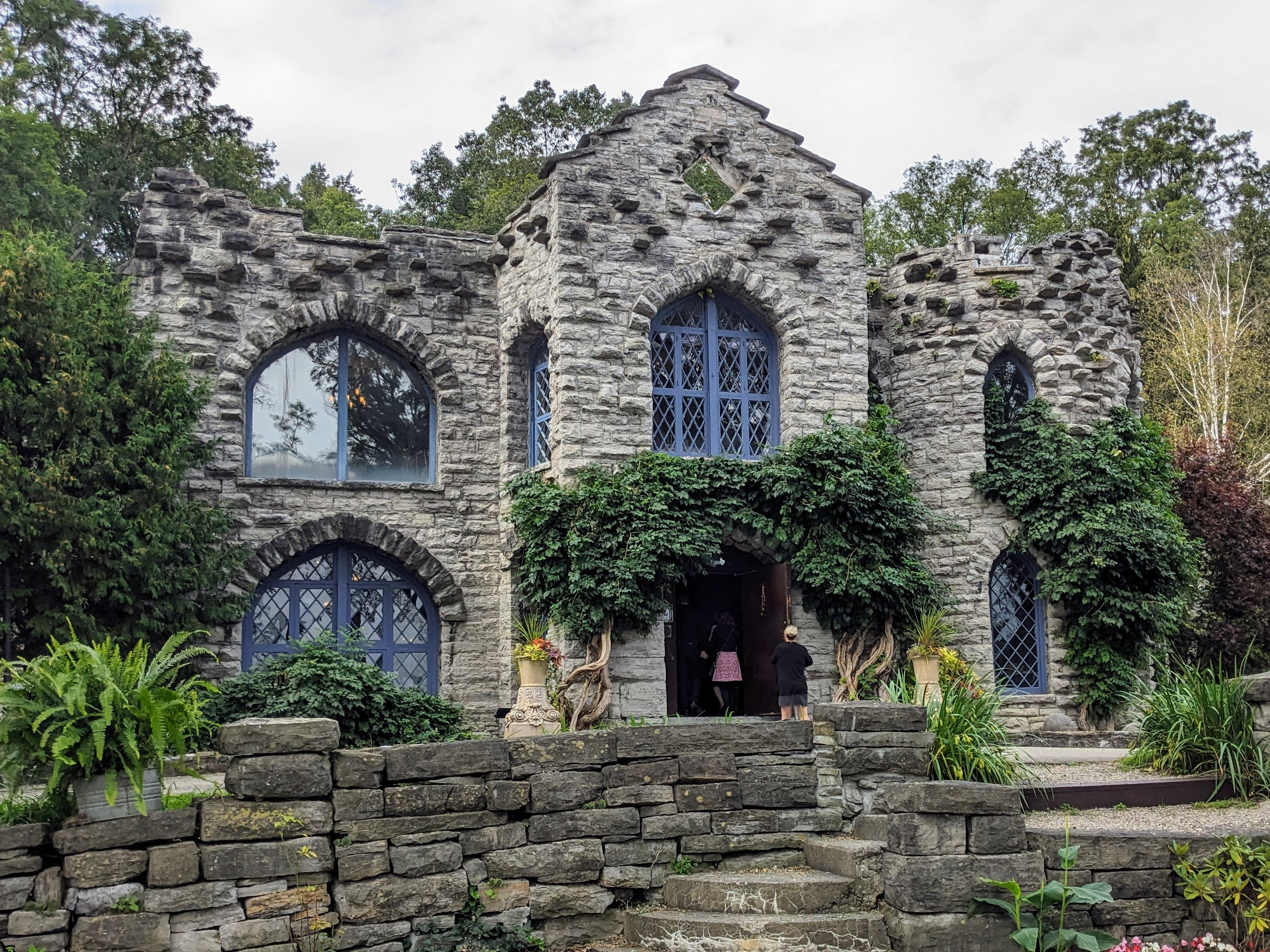
- Beardslee Castle seen from the front
- Interactive map of Beardslee Castle

Restaurant information
- Location: 123 Old State Road, Little Falls, New York, 13365, United States
- Website: www.beardsleecastle.com

Beardslee Castle is a three-story castle in Little Falls, New York, USA, constructed in 1860 as a replica of an Irish castle, and currently used as a restaurant and event venue.

== History ==
During the 1700s, the property was host to a fortified homestead. Tunnels nearby were used to store munitions and black powder during the French and Indian War. Local folklore claims that a group of Native American spies entered the tunnels with torches and accidentally set off an explosion.

In 1781, civil engineer John Beardslee left Connecticut, arriving in Whitestown, New York in 1787. He led a number of construction projects across the Mohawk Valley, and founded a settlement on the East Canada Creek, upriver of the future site of Beardslee Castle, called Beardslee Mills. Although it reached a population of 2,000 at one point, Beardslee Mills was bypassed by the Mohawk Turnpike and Erie Canal, and was eventually abandoned. John died in 1825.

John's son Augustus practiced law in Little Falls, and became wealthy through investments in the New York Central Railroad. He completed construction of the Castle in 1860. Augustus's son Guy Roosevelt Beardslee graduated last in the West Point Military Academy class of 1879 and resigned his commission a year later to return to Beardslee Castle. Guy built a hydroelectric generator to power the castle and its surrounding estate, claimed to be the first rural electrification project in the United States, and later sold the surplus power to nearby villages. In 1911 the generator was sold to a company that would later become part of the Niagara Mohawk Power Corporation.

Beardslee Castle suffered its first fire in February 1919, gutting the structure. Guy and his wife Ethel were on vacation in Florida at the time. They lost many possessions, including Native American artifacts from Guy's deployment to Nebraska. Arson was suspected, with the news reports mentioning a "mysterious man" seen near the building in the days before the fire, but was never proven. The main floor was rebuilt but the second floor was left windowless and roofless. Guy and Ethel had no children; after Guy's death in 1937 and Ethel's death in 1941, her sister sold the Castle to Anton "Pop" Christensen of St. Johnsville, who opened it to the public under the name of "The Manor".

Christensen committed suicide in the building after a lengthy terminal illness. His daughters sold the manor to a restaurateur from Herkimer: he sold it to a Richfield Springs businessman, Joe Casillo, in 1976. Casillo renamed it "Beardslee Manor", rebuilt the second floor and roof, and refinished the basement as a pub called the "Dungeon". Business gradually declined through the late '80s until a second fire broke out the morning of August 30, 1989, destroying the kitchen and closing the Castle.

After years of neglect and an eighteen-month restoration, the structure was reopened as "Beardslee Castle" in 1994. Renovations included restoring the original oak parquet floors and wood-panel ceilings, and washing the exterior stonework.

== Hauntings ==
Paranormal investigators and haunting fans hold that Beardslee Castle is a haunted house. Deaths that have occurred in the building, the two fires, and connections to Native American history have served as seeds for paranormal claims. The Castle's recent owners have encouraged this, finding it good for business; Casillo hired a professional ghost hunter in 1983, and staff often tell their personal ghost stories.
