= Crop yield =

Amount of farm product produced per unit area for a given time

Agricultural yields in key crops per hectare (1961 - 2023)

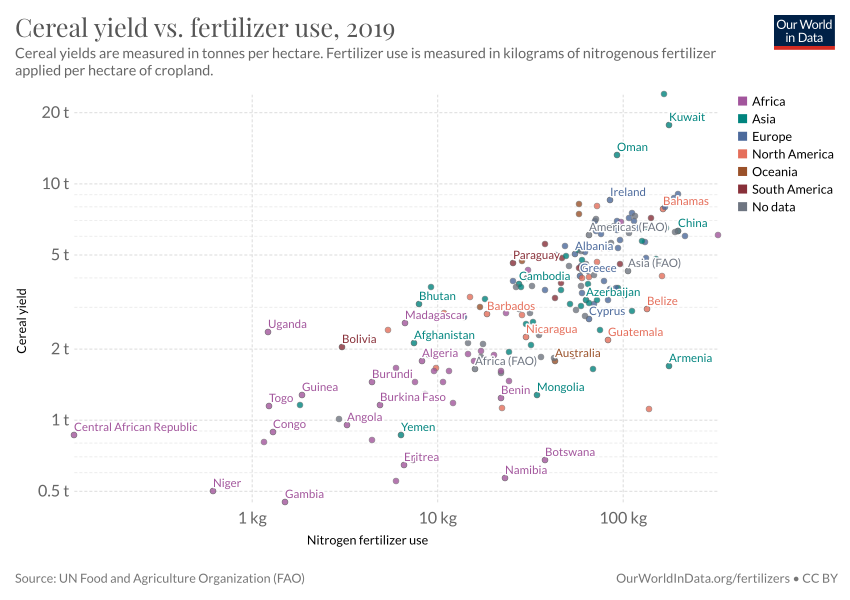
Cereal yield in tons per hectare and kilograms of nitrogenous fertilizer applied per hectare of cropland.

Long-term wheat yields per country in Europe

In agriculture, the yield is a measurement of the amount of a crop grown, or product such as wool, meat or milk produced, per unit area of land. The seed ratio is another way of calculating yields.

Innovations, such as the use of fertilizer, the creation of better farming tools, and new methods of farming and improved crop varieties have improved yields. The higher the yield and more intensive use of the farmland, the higher the productivity and profitability of a farm; this increases the well-being of farming families. Surplus crops beyond the needs of subsistence agriculture can be sold or bartered. The more grain or fodder a farmer can produce, the more draft animals such as horses and oxen could be supported and harnessed for labour and production of manure. Increased crop yields also means fewer hands are needed on farm, freeing them for industry and commerce. This, in turn, led to the formation and growth of cities, which then translated into an increased demand for foodstuffs or other agricultural products.

In 2025, around 1.7 billion people live in areas experiencing sizeable degradation-induced crop yield losses. Middle-income countries are the most affected, accounting for nearly 1 billion people, while in high-income countries, intensive input use sustains yields but masks degradation and increases environmental harm. Climate change is further compounding these pressures: a 2026 joint report by the FAO and the World Meteorological Organization (WMO) estimates that temperatures exceeding 25 °C trigger significant yield losses, with cascading effects on harvests and food prices that can persist for up to a year.

== Measurement ==
The units by which the yield of a crop is usually measured today are kilograms per hectare or bushels per acre. In Brazil, the customary unit of production of "sacks" is used, equivalent to 60 kilograms (132.277 pounds), and as a result production is measured in sacks per hectare. Long-term cereal yields in the United Kingdom were some 500 kg/ha in medieval times, jumping to 2000 kg/ha in the Industrial Revolution, and jumping again to 8000 kg/ha in the Green Revolution. Each technological advance increasing the crop yield also reduces the society's ecological footprint.

Yields are related to agricultural productivity, but are not synonymous. Agricultural productivity is measured in money produced per unit of land, but yields are measured in the weight of the crop produced per unit of land. A farmer can invest a large amount of money to increase his yields by a few percent, for example with an extremely expensive fertilizer, but if that cost is so high that it does not produce a comparative return on investment, his profits decline, and the higher yield can mean a lower agricultural productivity in this case. A yield is a 'partial measure of productivity', because it may fail to accurately measure the actual productivity of the farming operation by not including the totality of the inputs.

== Seed multiplication ratio ==
The seed multiplication ratio is the ratio between the investment in seed versus the yield. For example, if three grains are harvested for each grain seeded, the resulting multiplication ratio is 1:3, which is considered by some agronomists as the minimum required to sustain human life. One of the three seeds must be set aside for the next planting season, the remaining two either consumed by the grower, or for livestock feed. In parts of Europe the seed ratio during the 9th century was merely 1:2.5, in the Low Countries it improved to 1:14 with the introduction of the three-field system of crop rotation around the 14th century.

Seed multiplication ratio is variable, subject to several factors. Agricultural improvements can raise the ratio, and revisions were recommended in 2018 by the Indian Council of Agricultural Research.

== Law of physiological relations ==
Alexander Mitscherlich studied crop yields in 1909 and articulated a "law of physiological relations". It was compared to the law of diminishing returns in 1942, when Liebig's law of the minimum and the limiting factors of Frederick Blackman were also noted:

Liebig's Law of the Minimum was the formulation of an idea that yield of a crop was determined primarily by the amounts of plant food that were present in minimum quantities. His idea was discussed later as the Limiting Factor by BLACKMAN and again by MITSCHERLICH as the Law of Physiological Relations. The latter was expressed as a logarithmic function between yield and the quantity of plant food constituents, which is virtually the Law of Diminishing Returns.

The relation was reviewed by Hans Schneeberger in 2009.

== See also ==
- Actual Production History
- Agricultural productivity
- Grain yield monitor
- Green Revolution
- Yield (wine)

== Sources ==
This article incorporates text from a free content work. Licensed under CC BY 4.0 (license statement/permission). Text taken from The State of Food and Agriculture 2025, Food and Agriculture Organization of the United Nations.
