= Rural electrification =

Bringing electrical power to rural areas

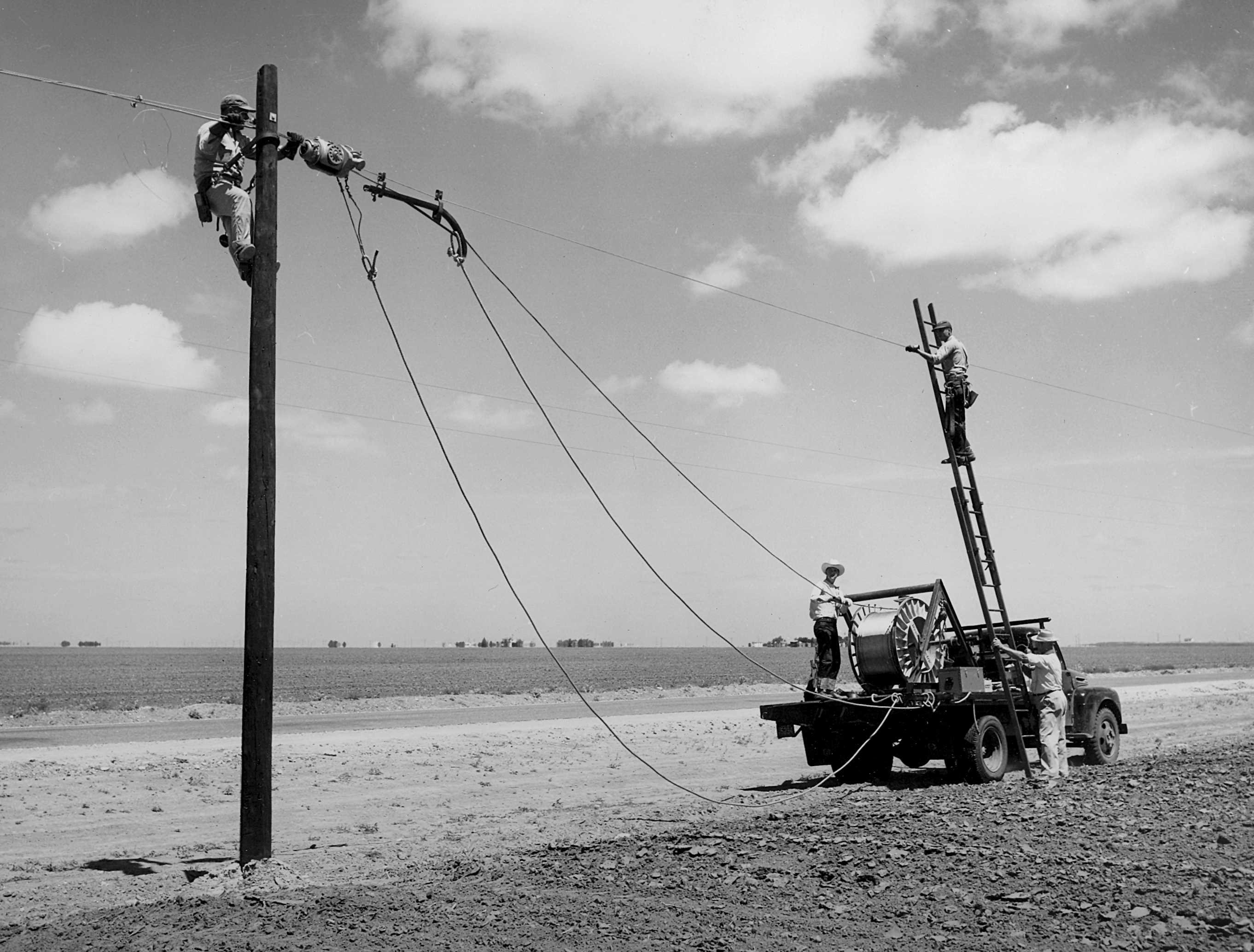
Construction of rural power distribution lines in the United States, funded by the Rural Electrification Administration

Share of the population with access to electricity

Rural electrification is the process of bringing electrical power to rural and remote areas. Rural communities are suffering from colossal market failures as the national grids fall short of their demand for electricity. As of 2019, 770 million people live without access to electricity – 10.2% of the global population. Electrification typically begins in cities and towns and gradually extends to rural areas, however, this process often runs into obstacles in developing nations. Expanding the national grid is expensive and countries consistently lack the capital to grow their current infrastructure. Additionally, amortizing capital costs to reduce the unit cost of each hook-up is harder to do in lightly populated areas (yielding higher per capita share of the expense). If countries are able to overcome these obstacles and reach nationwide electrification, rural communities will be able to reap considerable amounts of economic and social development.

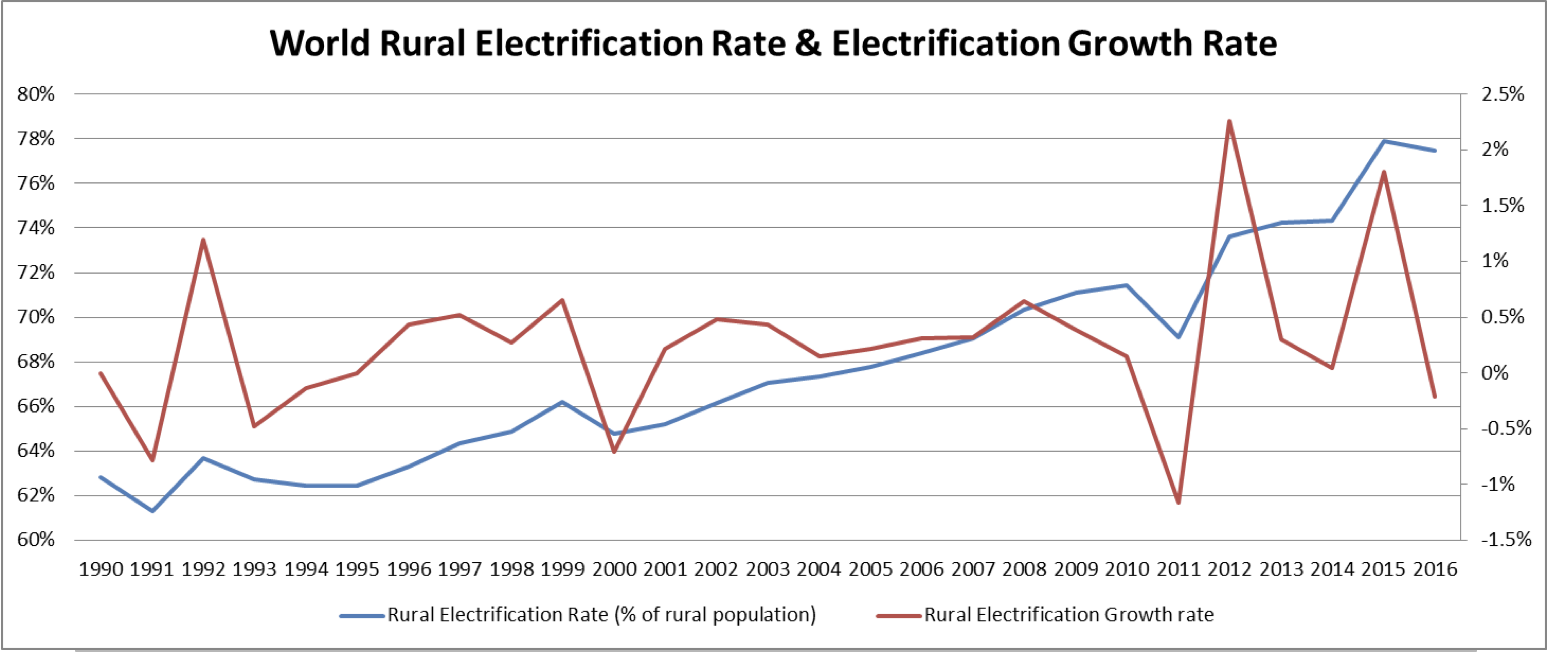
This graph shows the world rural electrification rate along with the electrification growth rate 1990–2016 and synthesizes data from the World Bank.

== Social and economic benefits ==
=== Education ===
Access to electricity facilitates sustainable economic and social growth. One of the most immediate gains is in enhanced educational attainment: students who once relied solely on daylight are able to study under LED lighting early in the morning or late into the night.

In Kenya for example, interviews with school teachers revealed that access to light has allowed for extra hours of teaching earlier and later in the day to cover material not adequately reviewed during normal hours. Additionally, schools with access to electricity are able to recruit higher quality teachers and have seen improvements on test scores and graduation rates, raising the human capital entering the labor force in the future.

=== Productivity and efficiency ===
In addition to improved education, rural electrification also allows for greater efficiency and productivity. Businesses will be able to keep their doors open for longer and generate additional revenues. Farmers will have access to streamlined modern techniques such as irrigation, crop processing, and food preservation. In 2014, rural communities in India gained more than US$21 million from increased economic activity driven by recent additions of electricity.

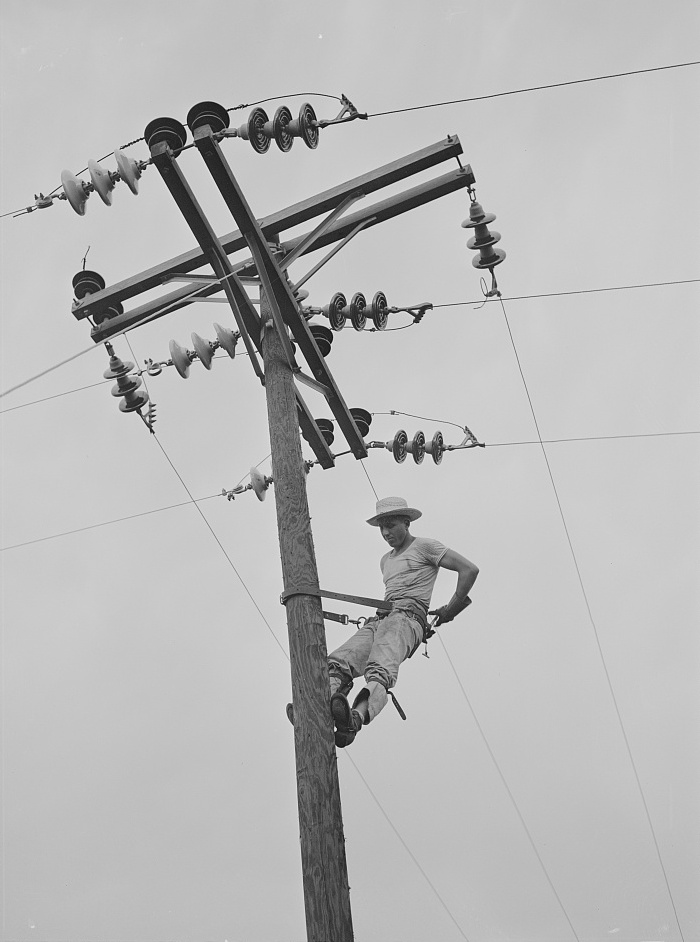
A Rural Electrification Administration lineman at work in Missouri, United States, in 1942

=== Job creation ===
When expanding the electrical grid, there is a demand for thousands of jobs ranging from business development to construction. Projects to spread electricity create a wealth of job opportunities and help to alleviate poverty. For example, India set a target of 175GW of clean energy to be installed by 2022 to increase electrification throughout the country. An estimated 300,000 jobs will need to be created in order to reach these lofty goals.

=== Healthcare improvements ===
The availability of electricity can drastically increase the quality of healthcare provided. Improved lighting increases the time patients can come and get treatment. Refrigerators can be used to conserve incredibly valuable vaccines and blood. Sterilization measures will be improved and the implementation of high tech machines such as x-rays or ultrasound scanners can provide doctors and nurses the tools they need to perform. In Diara Rhashalpool, a cluster of villages on the river Ganges, 140 households are without power. The locals are forced to travel 2–3 hours across the river for treatment or access to vaccines. With access to electricity, treatment would be far more accessible to the local population.

=== Additional benefits ===
- Reduce isolation and marginalization through telephone lines and Television
- Improve safety with the implementation of street lighting, lit road signs.
- Reduce expenses on expensive fossil fuel lamps i.e. kerosene

== Technology ==
Renewable off-grid enterprises have emerged in many areas to meet the demand for electricity in rural communities. Due to their geographical location and relatively low aggregate demand, expanding the nationwide grid to rural areas is expensive and challenging. Renewable energy based mini grids are less dependent on larger-scale infrastructure and can be implemented faster and cheaper. Where an electric power distribution grid can be set up single wire earth return is often used. The following technologies are used extensively:

- Photovoltaics
- Wind mechanical water pumps
- Small wind electric
- Diesel solar hybrid power systems: especially for telecommunications worldwide. Fully commercial and the preferred option for remote telecommunications, commercially evolving for village power.
- Bioenergy
- Micro hydro is very widely implemented in Nepal, Vietnam, and China.
- Hybrid power is also widely used where a number of different technologies are combined to provide a single power source.

== Challenges ==
Researchers pointed out that while many supportive policies have been put in place, cost for providing electricity to remote villages remains high. Furthermore, both energy resources and demand in these areas can be very volatile, making it difficult to plan appropriately. Another issue is that village location was determined historically based on soil, water, storage, etc., and might not be optimal for renewable energy generation.

To mitigate these issues, the Networked Rural Electrification Model has been proposed. In this model, villages in a selected area are linked up via an optimal network, which in turn connects to a few centralized generation facilities located at spots with better renewable energy resources. As such, each village is partially supplied by small local facility, and partially by the centralized facilities. This improves energy resources utilization as well as overall system flexibility and reliability. Viability of this model depends on the cost of building the optimal network. Based on multiplier-accelerated A* algorithm, the researchers have devised an effective method for evaluating all possible connections under complex geographical structure and hence practically optimize network design. Economic justification follows.

== National initiatives by continent ==
=== Africa ===
Ethiopia

Ethiopia rural electrification started in 1998 (although minor activities were there before 1995–1997 to electrify major cities called zone and woreda) then followed by the Millennium Development Goal 1998-2002 Universal Electric Access Program (UEAP) started and the program planned to electrify 6000 villages in 5 years. After lessons were taken from that the Growth and transformation plan (GTPI &2) were launched. The program is one of the successfully accomplished in increasing the rural access rate and transforming the rural community, creating jobs, local contractors and cooperatives. The program was financed by supporting funds, loans and government.

==== Kenya ====
Karanja describes the role that a coordinated approach to rural electrification can play in Kenya and the challenges that arise. One solution is the combine numerical electricity system modeling with geographical information to explore various mixes of grid extension, mini-grids, and standalone systems.

A 2024 study evaluating solar mini-grids in Kenya found significant improvements in household income, safety, and productivity. The median income in electrified Kenyan communities increased fourfold, indicating strong social and economic impacts of rural solar deployment.

==== Senegal ====
Senegal's electricity sector was reformed in 1998. Since then the country has implemented several electrification initiatives:

- A national Senegalese Rural Electrification Action Plan (Plan d'Action Sénégalais d'Électrification Rurale), designed to increase private sector participation in rural electrification (details below);
- Covenants and an Emergency Programme (Programme d'Urgence d'Électrification Rurale), both led and funded largely by the Government of Senegal;
- Individual projects led by NGOs and private companies.

The Senegalese Rural Electrification Action Plan was launched in 2002 with the aim of maximising investment from the private sector. It raised an average of 49% private finance over 2002–2012, more than double the 22% global average for energy access projects. However, during the same period it directly increased rural electrification levels by less than 1%. Analysis by Mawhood and Gross (2014) indicates that the Action Plan has faced considerable political and institutional barriers, notably institutional opposition, wavering ministerial support and lengthy stakeholder negotiations, as well as the inherent difficulties of implementing an innovative policy framework. Although the Action Plan has been very successful at attracting private finance, the political/institutional challenges it has faced reflect the experiences of reform-based electrification schemes across Sub-Saharan Africa. This highlights the importance of designing initiatives to fit the local policy environment.

=== Americas ===
==== Brazil ====
In 1981, 74.9% of Brazilian households were served by electric power, according to the IBGE's National Sample Survey of Households (PNAD). In 2000, the Federal government of Brazil, under the Fernando Henrique Cardoso administration, launched the Luz no Campo program to expand the distribution of electricity in Brazilian domiciles, with a focus on rural households. From 2003 on, the program was reinforced and renamed Luz para Todos by the Lula administration. The results were that, according to the PNAD, by 1996, 79.9% of all households had access to an electric power supply and that proportion rose to 90.8% in 2002 and 98.9% in 2009.

==== Haiti ====
Haiti remains the least electrified country in the Western Hemisphere, but several ambitious efforts have launched to address rural electrification in the country. Some have pointed out that because so much of rural Haiti currently lacks utility infrastructure, Haiti is well-positioned to leapfrog into modern, modular energy systems like microgrids (or "mini-grids") powered by renewable energy. The Haitian Government's energy regulator, along with the Energy Cell of the Ministry of Public Works and international partners are working to remove barriers and increase investment in renewable energy for both new, isolated mini-grids and regional grids.

Using 2020 data, the Inter-American Development Bank estimated that 45% of the Haitian population had access to electricity. But frequent fuel shortages and other service disruptions mean that the population's real access to reliable electricity service is much lower. For example, in 2021 and 2022 even the nation's most important hospitals were curtailing their services due to lack of fuel to power their own generators for on-site electricity.

==== Jamaica ====
The Rural Electrification Programme (REP) was incorporated in 1975 with the specific mandate to expand the reach of electricity supply to rural areas, where the provision of such services would not be economically viable for commercial providers of electricity. The REP extends the national grid through the construction of electrical distribution pole lines to un-electrified areas and provides house wiring assistance through a loan programme to householders.

In June 2012 Energy Minister Phillip Paulwell disclosed that, approximately 16,000 homes in remote parts of the island which do not have electricity are to be supplied with solar or wind electricity through the Rural Electrification Programme (REP). At a USAID-funded Analysis and Investigation for Low Emission (AILEG) project symposium, held at the Jamaica Pegasus Hotel, on Tuesday, July 9, 2013, Energy Minister Phillip Paulwell stated that the REP has also been mandated to complete its target of providing electricity to 100 per cent of rural areas. "Those three per cent that now remain are in areas that are so far from the grid, it is too expensive (to provide), and we are going to be deploying photovoltaic systems in these areas," he explained. In March 2015 he told a newspaper that, by 2017, "we should no longer have REP in the way we do now", adding that if the Government finds it too challenging to run power lines into communities, it will use solar."

See Also Solar Power in Jamaica

==== United States ====
In 1892, Guy Beardslee, the original owner of Beardslee Castle, was paid $40,000 to provide hydroelectric power to East Creek in New York. Despite widespread electricity in cities, by the 1920s electricity was not delivered by power companies to rural areas because of the general belief that the infrastructure costs would not be recouped. In sparsely-populated farmland, there were far fewer houses per mile of installed electric lines.

A Minnesota state committee was organized to carry out a study of the costs and benefits of rural electrification. The University of Minnesota Department of Biosystems and Agricultural Engineering, working jointly with Northern States Power Company (NSP, now Xcel Energy), conducted an experiment, providing electricity to nine farms in the Red Wing area. Electricity was first delivered on December 24, 1923. The "Red Wing Project" was successful – the power company and the university concluded that rural electrification was economically feasible. The results of the report were influential in the National government's decision to support rural electrification.

Before 1936, a small but growing number of farms installed small wind-electric plants. These generally used a 40V DC generator to charge batteries in the barn or the basement of the farmhouse. This was enough to provide lighting, washing machines and some limited well-pumping or refrigeration. Wind-electric plants were used mostly on the Great Plains, which have usable winds on most days.

In 1933, the Tennessee Valley Authority was created, in part, to provide rural electrification in the Tennessee Valley and surrounding areas. TVA created the generation and wholesale transmission capabilities that enabled rural distribution systems through electric cooperatives. Of the 6.3 million farms in the United States in January 1925, only 205,000 were receiving centralized electric services.

The Rural Electrification Administration (REA) was created by executive order as an independent federal bureau in 1935, authorized by the United States Congress in the 1936 Rural Electrification Act, and later in 1939, reorganized as a division of the U.S. Dept. of Agriculture. It was charged with administering loan programs for electrification and telephone service in rural areas. Between 1935 and 1939 – or the first 4½ years after REA's establishment, the number of farms using electric services more than doubled.

The REA undertook to provide farms with inexpensive electric lighting and power. To implement those goals the administration made long-term, self-liquidating loans to state and local governments, to farmers' cooperatives, and to nonprofit organizations; no loans were made directly to consumers. In 1949 the REA was authorized to make loans for telephone improvements; in 1988, REA was permitted to give interest-free loans for job creation and rural electric systems. By the early 1970s about 98% of all farms in the United States had electric service, a demonstration of REA's success. In 1994 the administration was reorganized into the Rural Utilities Service by the Federal Crop Insurance Reform Act of 1994 and the Department of Agriculture Reorganization Act of 1994.

In September 2018, the U.S. Department of Agriculture said it would spend $398.5 million in infrastructure projects, by way of loans, that seek to improve electricity service in rural areas. The program is called the Electric Infrastructure Loan Program. Of the $398.5 million, $43 million will be to invest in smart grid technology. According to Smart Cities Dive, "The largest loan will send $68.5 million to back a solar farm run by NextEra Energy Resources in Arkansas, which could meet the needs of 21,000 homes." The loans will go to projects in 13 states: Arkansas, Colorado, Indiana, Iowa, Minnesota, Missouri, New Mexico, North Carolina, Ohio, Oklahoma, South Carolina, Texas and Virginia.

=== Asia ===
==== China ====
By the 1970s, household electrification had become commonplace in urban centres across China, however, it remained rare in the countryside and in smaller, outlying centres.

Even in the early 1990s rural areas of China still suffered from extreme energy poverty; more than 40 percent of rural Chinese had no access to power or electric lighting at all, depending instead on kerosene lamps for lighting. In the early 1990s the average use of power in the countryside amounted to the equivalent of a 60W light bulb switched on for less than 30 minutes a day.

Deng Xiaoping, who became China's leader in 1978, initiated a rural electrification drive as part of a broader modernization effort, aimed at bridging the divide that had opened between the city and the country. This initiative steadily gained traction over the next two decades, and by 2000 electricity had become virtually universal across regional China, with only the most remote areas still lacking access.

China launched the China Township Electrification Program in 2001 to provide renewable electricity to 1,000 townships, one of the largest of such programs in the world. This was followed by the China Village Electrification Program, also using renewable energy, aimed at the electrification of a further 3.5 million households in 10,000 villages by 2010, to be followed by full rural electrification by 2015.

In December 2015, China brought the last 39,800 Chinese onto the national electric grid by spending $324 million and using over 5,000 workers to wire 2 extremely remote villages in Quighai province located at altitudes of 13,100 ft.

==== India ====
All villages in India had been electrified by April 2018, however, household electrification was still not universal in the late 2010s. By India's own set standards, only 10% of households in a village must have electricity for it to be considered electrified. By August 2018, 91% of the total households had been electrified in India. In the early 21st century, rural areas in India were electrified non-uniformly, with richer states were able to provide a majority of the villages with power while poorer states still struggled to do so.

The Rural Electrification Corporation Limited was formed to specifically address the issue of providing electricity in all the villages across the country. Poverty, lack of resources, lack of political will, poor planning, and electricity theft are some of the major causes which have left many villages in India without electricity, while urban areas have enjoyed growth in electricity consumption and capacity. In order to drastically increase electrification rates, the Indian Government has set the target of 175GW of installed renewable energy by 2022 and mandated the electrification of over 18,000 villages. At the end of 2016, India had around 45.6GW of installed renewable energy with a vast amount of work and investment required to meet their lofty targets. The central government is increasingly trying to improve the dire conditions by investing heavily in biogas, solar as well as wind energy. Programs such as The JNN solar mission, and Pradhan Mantri Gram Vidyut Yojana is also known as the Saubhagya Scheme have been announced to fasten the pace of electrification and diversify the procedure. The work is also on-going for reducing wastage, providing better equipment and improving the overall infrastructure for electrical transmissions in villages.

The Saubhagya scheme was successfully in ensuring rapid expansion of the electricity infrastructure in India. Electricity infrastructure is now available within 50 meters of consumers' premises. The Government of India announced 100% electrification of all willing households in India in 2018. A deeper look into electrification rates across the country suggest that about 13% of household consumers still don't have electricity connections due to questions of affordability of grid electricity and poor quality of service. The majority of household consumers with a grid-based electricity connection have a low sanctioned load of 0–1 kW or 1–2 kW. Besides, disparity has also been noted in grid electricity access rate among agricultural and institutional consumers.

=== Europe ===
==== Ireland ====
During the 1930s most towns in Ireland were connected to the national grid. The outbreak of World War II in Europe lead to shortages of fuel and materials and the electrification process was brought to a virtual halt. In the early 1950s the Rural Electrification scheme gradually brought electric power to the countryside, a process that was completed on the mainland in 1973 (although it wasn't until 2003 that the last of the inhabited offshore islands were fully connected). Currently the Rural Electrification scheme continues, but is primarily concerned with upgrading the quality of the network (voltage fluctuations are still a problem in parts of Ireland – particularly in rural areas) and making three phase supplies available to larger farms and rural businesses requiring it.

== Successful examples ==
=== Gram Oorja ===
Like many other microgrid companies, Gram Oorja has set out to provide electricity to the millions who lack access to power in rural India. Gram Oorja created a model based upon “corporate-social partnership” and gains funding from corporate charity funds. Their first project was in Darewadi, a rural village with 39 households. Gram Oorja raised funding from Bosch Solar Energy and received consultation and guidance from the Shakti Foundation. They installed a solar power plant capable of producing 9.4 kilowatts of power with a backup biogas unit to produce energy when sunlight is not available. Local ownership of the project is one of the key tenets of Gram Oorja's business model, so they encouraged participation in the set up and management of the mini-grid. A village trust collects bills every month and deposits the revenue into a corpus fund. This hybrid model proved to be successful and has been implemented in over 10 villages. Gram Oorja currently has an installed capacity of 45.7 kW and serves 230 households. They have also partnered with Bank of America to continue to implement these projects across India.

=== G.R.I.D. (Grassroots and Rural Innovative Development) ===
GRID is an Indian start-up aimed at facilitating sustainable economic and social development through low-cost energy solutions in rural areas. Outside of microgrid systems, GRID has utilized solar energy to solve a myriad of issues that plague rural communities. For example, GRID has set up solar-powered reverse osmosis filtration plants in rural India to help eliminate water insecurity. Only 18% of India's rural population have access to treated tap water, forcing locals to rely on unsafe groundwater. GRID's filtration plant is able to provide 20,000 to 30,000 liters of clean water per day, which helps to alleviate this issue and reduce the spread of water-borne illness. Additionally, the ease of distribution has reduced the amount of time spent collecting water, allowing for more time on productive tasks and a reduction in time poverty. Finally, GRID employs locals in the community to run the plant's day-to-day operations. From the ground up, GRID's business model fosters the development of rural communities and they plan to scale their operations across India.

== See also ==
- Distributed generation
- Category:Energy by country
- Indoor air pollution in developing nations
- List of energy storage projects
- Microgeneration
- Off-the-grid
- Power line communications
- Renewable energy in Africa
- Stand-alone power system
- Universal Service Fund
