= Crop Revenue Coverage =

Crop Revenue Coverage (CRC) is a form of revenue insurance that protects a producer's revenue for an insurable crop whenever low prices, low yields, or a combination of both causes revenue to fall below a guaranteed level selected by the producer. It differs from other revenue insurance programs by allowing producers to use the higher of the planting price or the market price in determining a target level of revenue.
