= Failed acreage =

Failed acreage refers to tracts of properly-planted and managed crops that did not grow or were destroyed due to a natural disaster. In the United States of America, failed acreage is eligible for indemnification if covered by the federal crop insurance program.
