= China Village Electrification Program =

Chinese renewable energy scheme

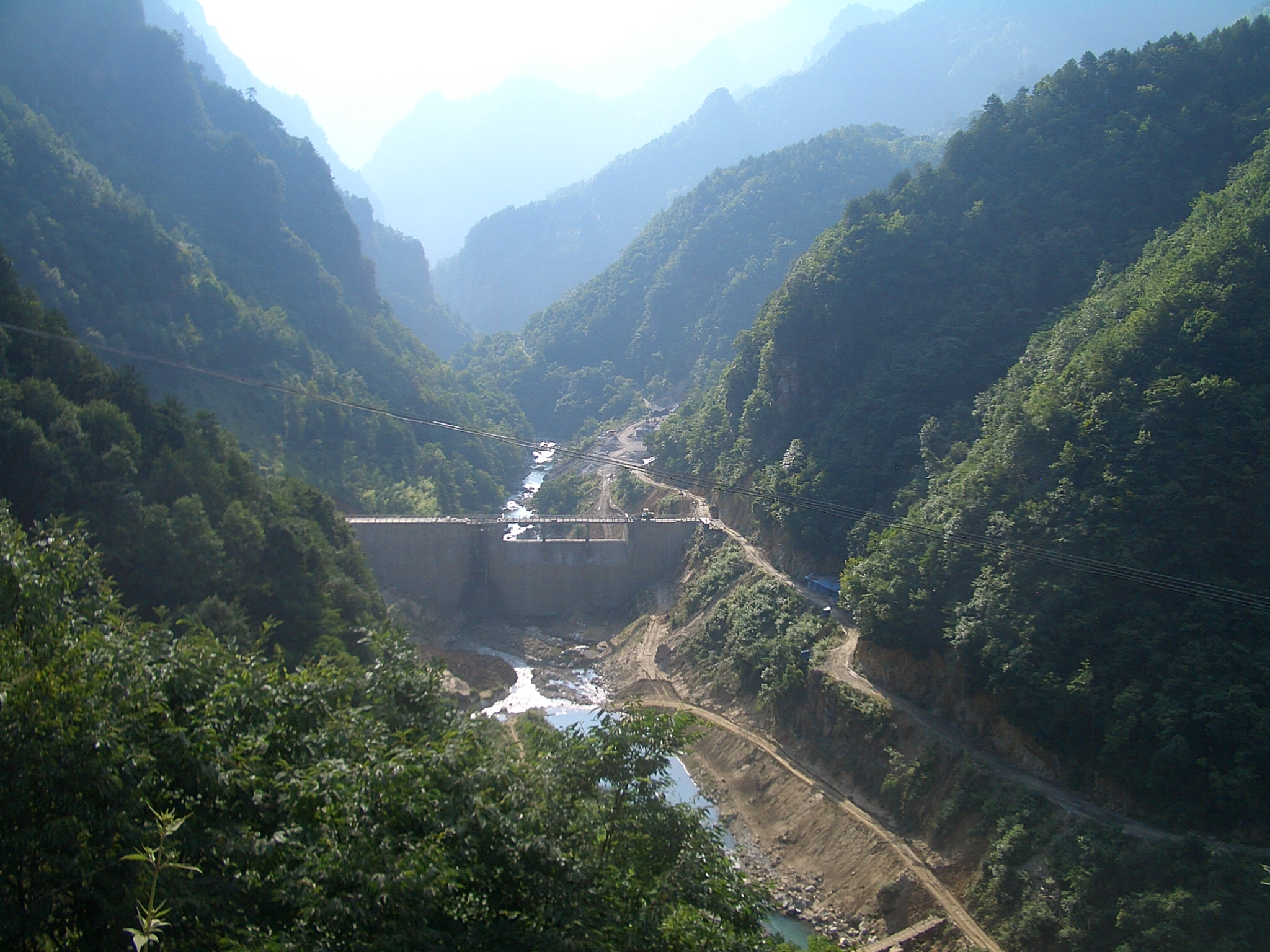
A hydro power plant under construction in Shennongjia Forest District, Hubei

The China Village Electrification Program (Song Dian Dao Cun) was a scheme to provide renewable electricity to 3.5 million households in 10,000 villages by 2010. This was to be followed by full rural electrification using renewable energy by 2015.

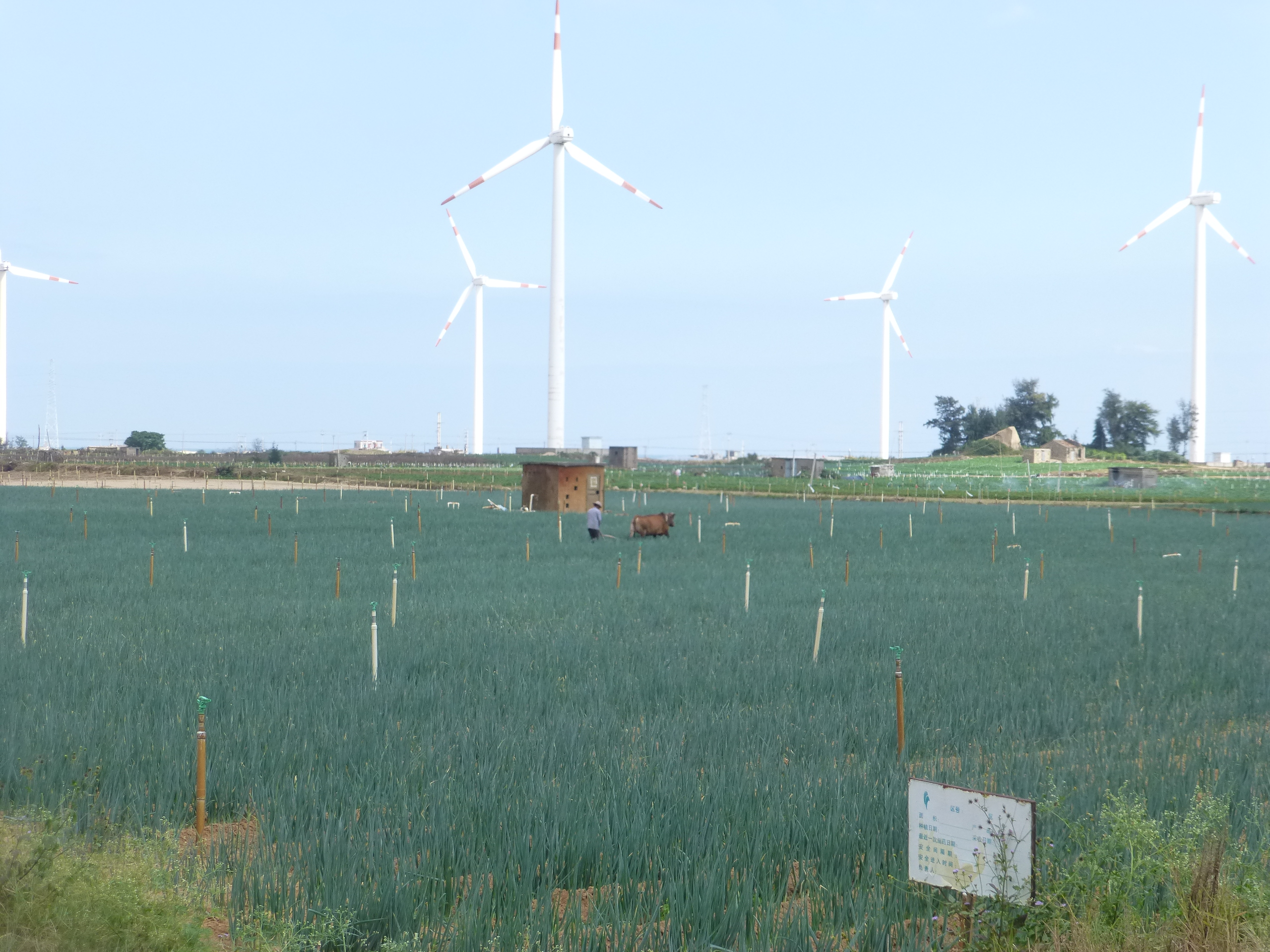
Wind turbines above a field of onions in Liu'ao, Fuijian

The total program was expected to cost in the region of US$5 billion, and solar generated electricity were expected to play a major role. China produces around 20% of the world's total solar cells, and production is growing at over 50% each year. Small hydro and wind power were also likely to be employed. The Program followed on from the smaller China Township Electrification Program which ended in 2005. China was committed to generating 10% of its electricity from renewables by 2010.
