= China Gas =

China Gas Holdings Ltd
- Traded as: SEHK: 384
- Industry: Natural gas
- Products: Natural gas
- Revenue: HK$31,686,028,000 (FY ending March 2015)
- Number of employees: 38,500
- Website: chinagasholdings.com.hk

China Gas Holdings Limited is a Chinese natural gas company principally engaged in the distribution of natural gas in 273 Chinese cities.
