= China Township Electrification Program =

The China Township Electrification Program (Song Dian Dao Xiang) was a scheme to provide renewable electricity to 1.3 million people (around 200,000 households) in 1,000 townships in the Chinese provinces of Gansu, Hunan, Inner Mongolia, Shaanxi, Sichuan, Yunnan, Xinjiang, Qinghai and Tibet.

The program, one of the world's largest renewable energy rural electrification programs, used a mixture of small hydro, photovoltaics and wind power. It was launched in 2001 by the State Development Planning Commission (now the National Development and Reform Commission) and was completed in 2005.

The program is being succeeded by a similar but larger China Village Electrification Program which will bring renewable electricity to 3.5 million households in 10,000 villages by 2010, to be followed by full rural electrification by 2015. China committed to generating 10% of its electricity from renewables by 2010.
