= Multi-peril crop insurance =

Multi-peril crop insurance (MPCI) is the oldest and most common form of the federal crop insurance programme in the United States of America. MPCI protects against crop yield losses by allowing participating producers to insure a certain percentage of historical crop production. A single policy protects crops against all natural perils including adverse weather, fire, insects, disease, wildlife, earthquake, volcanic eruption and failure of irrigation water due to unavoidable causes. It is delivered by private companies and reinsured by the federal government.
