= Federal Crop Insurance Reform and Department of Agriculture Reorganization Act of 1994 =

- Long title: An Act to reform the Federal crop insurance program, and for other purposes.
- Enacted by: the 103rd United States Congress
- Effective: October 13, 1994

Citations
- Public law: 103-354
- Statutes at Large: 108 Stat. 3178

Legislative history
- Introduced in the House as H.R. 4217 by Kika de la Garza (D-TX) on April 14, 1994; Committee consideration by House Agriculture; Signed into law by President Bill Clinton on October 13, 1994

The Federal Crop Insurance Reform and Department of Agriculture Reorganization Act of 1994, Pub. L. 103–354, 108 Stat. 3178, was introduced on April 14, 1994 by Kika de la Garza (D-TX) and was signed into law on October 13, 1994 by President Bill Clinton. It consisted of two titles:

== Federal Crop Insurance Reform Act of 1994 ==
The Federal Crop Insurance Reform Act of 1994, Title I, modified the federal crop insurance program, beginning with the 1995 crops. It authorized a new catastrophic (CAT) coverage level available to farmers. The premium on this level of coverage (crop losses in excess of 50% receiving a payment of 60% (now, 55%) of the market price of the insured crop) is 100% subsidized by the government, but requires a farmer to pay a $50 per crop per county administrative fee (since raised to $100 per crop). The Act allows farmers to purchase additional insurance coverage providing higher yield or price protection levels, with the premium on this buy-up coverage partially subsidized by the government. The Act also created the Noninsured Assistance Program (NAP), a permanent disaster payments program for crops not covered by crop insurance. The 1994 Act amended and in many cases suppressed major portions of the Federal Crop Insurance Act of 1980 (P.L. 96-365) which serves as the authorizing statute for the federal crop insurance program. The 1980 Act expanded the scope of the crop insurance program and permitted USDA to subsidize farmer premium payments. The Agriculture Risk Protection Act of 2000 (P.L. 106-224) made subsequent enhancements and reforms to the crop insurance program.

== Department of Agriculture Reorganization Act of 1994 ==
The Department of Agriculture Reorganization Act of 1994, Title II, gave the Secretary of Agriculture broad authority to reorganize the United States Department of Agriculture (USDA) to achieve greater efficiency, effectiveness, and economy. The law called for consolidation of agencies and offices, as well as a reduction in personnel of 7,500 by the end of FY 1999.

The Act created an Undersecretary of Research in charge of USDA's Research, Education and Economics division, which includes the National Agricultural Statistics Service and the Economic Research Service. In 2008 the position was also given the title of Chief Scientist, and has generally been held by scientists and public health professionals.
