= 1861 Iowa Senate election =

- 1861

25 out of 49 seats in the Iowa State Senate 25 seats needed for a majority
	Majority party	Minority party
Party	Republican	Democratic
Last election	22	21
Seats before	22 (Note: Following the 1859 Iowa Senate election, Republicans held 22 seats to Democrats' 21. However, four changes occurred during the eighth general assembly. In the ninth district, Republican Senator Alvin Saunders resigned on May 14, 1861, causing a vacancy in his seat. Republican Leroy G. Palmer succeeded Senator Saunders, holding the seat for the Republicans. In the tenth district, Republican Senator Wilson resigned on October 7, 1861, causing a vacancy in his seat. The tenth district seat was left vacant until a special election in 1861. In the fourteenth district, Democratic Senator Andrew Oliphant Patterson resigned on May 14, 1861, causing a vacancy in his seat. Republican Joseph A. Green succeeded Senator Patterson, flipping the seat to Republican control. In the thirty-fifth district, Republican Senator Thomas Drummond resigned on May 14, 1861, causing a vacancy in his seat. Republican Joseph Dysart succeeded Senator Drummond, holding the seat for the Republicans. Therefore, by election day in 1861, the Republicans held 22 seats, the Democrats held 20 seats, and one seat was vacant (the seat that had been held by Republican Senator James F. Wilson).)	20
Seats after	33 (Note: The Iowa Senate expanded from 43 seats to 49 seats following the 1861 general election.)	16
Seat change	▲11	▼4
President of the Iowa Senate (Note: Article IV, section 18, of the Constitution of Iowa at that time established that the Lieutenant Governor of Iowa shall perform the duties of the President of the Senate. The Lieutenant Governor performed the duties of President of the Senate from January 11, 1858 through January 14, 1991. As of 1991, duties of Iowa's Lieutenant Governor no longer include presiding over the state Senate.) before election
Nicholas J. Rusch (Note: As Lieutenant Governor, Nicholas J. Rusch was the ninth President of the Iowa Senate. He served during the eighth Iowa General Assembly, succeeding Republican Oran Faville in that leadership position.)
Republican
Elected President of the Iowa Senate
John R. Needham (Note: As the next Lieutenant Governor, John R. Needham was the tenth President of the Iowa Senate. He served during the ninth Iowa General Assembly, succeeding Republican Nicholas J. Rusch in that leadership position.)
Republican

In the 1861 Iowa State Senate elections, Iowa voters elected state senators to serve in the ninth Iowa General Assembly. Following the expansion of the Iowa Senate from 43 to 49 seats in 1861, elections were held for 25 of the state senate's 49 seats. (Note: At the time, the Iowa Senate had several multi-member districts.) State senators serve four-year terms in the Iowa State Senate.

The general election took place in 1861.

Following the previous election in 1859, Republicans had control of the Iowa Senate with 22 seats to Democrats' 21 seats. However, four changes occurred during the eighth general assembly. In the ninth district, Republican Senator Alvin Saunders resigned on May 14, 1861, causing a vacancy in his seat. Republican Leroy G. Palmer succeeded Senator Saunders, holding the seat for the Republicans. In the tenth district, Republican Senator James Falconer Wilson resigned on October 7, 1861, causing a vacancy in his seat. The tenth district seat was left vacant until a special election in 1861. In the fourteenth district, Democratic Senator Andrew Oliphant Patterson resigned on May 14, 1861, causing a vacancy in his seat. Republican Joseph A. Green succeeded Senator Patterson, flipping the seat to Republican control. In the thirty-fifth district, Republican Senator Thomas Drummond resigned on May 14, 1861, causing a vacancy in his seat. Republican Joseph Dysart succeeded Senator Drummond, holding the seat for the Republicans. Therefore, by election day in 1861, the Republicans held 22 seats, the Democrats held 20 seats, and one seat was vacant (the seat that had been held by Republican Senator James F. Wilson).

To claim control of the chamber from Republicans, the Democrats needed to net five Senate seats.

Republicans maintained control of the Iowa State Senate following the election with the balance of power shifting to Republicans holding 33 seats and Democrats having 16 seats (a net gain of 11 seats for Republicans).

== Summary of results ==
- Note: The holdover Senators not up for re-election are not listed on this table.

Senate District	Incumbent	Party	Elected Senator	Party	Outcome
1st (Note: The first was a 2-member district at the time.)	Valentine Buechel	Dem	Frederick Hesser	Dem	Dem Hold
1st	John Walker Rankin	Rep	George Washington McCrary	Rep	Rep Hold
2nd (Note: The second district was a 1-member district at the time.)	Gideon Smith Bailey	Dem	Abner Harrison McCrary	Rep	Rep Gain
5th (Note: The fifth district transitioned from a 1- to 2-member district at the time. Senator Taylor was a holdover incumbent not up for re-election.)	Newly created subdistrict		Elijah F. Esteb	Dem	Dem Gain
8th (Note: The eighth district was a 1-member district at the time.)	William Findlay Coolbaugh	Dem	John G. Foote	Rep	Rep Gain
9th (Note: The ninth district was a 1-member district at the time.)	Alvin Saunders (Note: In the ninth district, Republican Senator Alvin Saunders resigned on May 14, 1861, causing a vacancy in his seat. Republican Leroy G. Palmer succeeded Senator Saunders.)	Rep	Theron Webb Woolson	Rep	Rep Hold
9th	Leroy G. Palmer (Note: Republican Leroy G. Palmer succeeded Senator Saunders, holding the seat for the Republicans.)	Rep	Theron Webb Woolson	Rep	Rep Hold
10th (Note: The tenth district was a 1-member district at the time.)	James Falconer Wilson (Note: Senator Wilson resigned on October 7, 1861, causing a vacancy in his seat.)	Rep	Joshua Monroe Shaffer	Rep	Rep Hold
10th	Vacancy upon Senator Wilson's resignation.		Joshua Monroe Shaffer	Rep	Rep Hold
11th (Note: The eleventh district was a 1-member district at the time.)	John A. Johnson	Dem	Jacob W. Dixon	Rep	Rep Gain
12th (Note: The twelfth district was a 1-member district at the time.)	Daniel A. Anderson	Rep	Warren S. Dungan	Rep	Rep Hold
13th (Note: The thirteenth district was a 1-member district at the time.)	Samuel Reiner	Rep	James Simpson Hurley	Rep	Rep Hold
14th (Note: The fourteenth district was a 1-member district at the time.)	Andrew Oliphant Patterson (Note: In the fourteenth district, Democratic Senator Andrew Oliphant Patterson resigned on May 14, 1861, causing a vacancy in his seat.)	Dem	William G. Woodward	Rep	Rep Hold
14th	Joseph A. Green (Note: Republican Joseph A. Green succeeded Senator Patterson, flipping the seat to Republican control.)	Rep	William G. Woodward	Rep	Rep Hold
15th (Note: The fifteenth district was a 1-member district at the time.) (Note: There was not an election in this district. Instead, the incumbent switched political parties.)	William B. Lewis (Note: Senator Lewis was an incumbent holdover senator not up for re-election. Instead, he switched parties from Democrat to Republican.)	Dem	William B. Lewis	Rep	Rep Gain
16th (Note: The sixteenth district was a 1-member district at the time.)	Oliver P. Sherraden	Rep	Isaac Pearl Teter	Rep	Rep Hold
18th (Note: The eighteenth district was a 1-member district at the time.)	Jairus Edward Neal	Dem	Jairus Edward Neal	Dem	Dem Hold
19th (Note: The nineteenth district transitioned from a 1- to 2-member district at the time.)	John W. Thompson	Rep	Benjamin F. Gue	Rep	Rep Hold
19th	Newly created subdistrict		Joseph B. Leake	Rep	Rep Gain
20th (Note: The twentieth district was a 1-member district at the time.)	George M. Davis	Rep	Norman Boardman	Rep	Rep Hold
23rd (Note: The twenty-third district was a 1-member district at the time.)	William P. Davis	Rep	Joshua H. Hatch	Rep	Rep Hold
25th (Note: The twenty-fifth district was a 1-member district at the time.)	Joseph Mann	Dem	William H. Holmes	Rep	Rep Gain
27th (Note: The twenty-seventh district was a 2-member district at the time. Senator Trumbull was a holdover incumbent not up for re-election.)	David S. Wilson	Dem	John D. Jennings	Dem	Dem Hold
29th (Note: The twenty-ninth district transitioned from a 1- to 2-member district at the time. Senator Henderson was a holdover incumbent not up for re-election.)	Newly created subdistrict		John Kern	Dem	Dem Gain
30th (Note: The thirtieth district was a 1-member district at the time.)	Marquis Lafayette McPherson	Rep	Marquis Lafayette McPherson	Rep	Rep Hold
31st (Note: The thirty-first district was a 1-member district at the time.)	William H.M. Pusey	Dem	James Redfield	Rep	Rep Gain
35th (Note: The thirty-fifth district was a 1-member district at the time.)	Thomas Drummond (Note: In the thirty-fifth district, Republican Senator Thomas Drummond resigned on May 14, 1861, causing a vacancy in his seat.)	Rep	Joseph Dysart (Note: Republican Joseph Dysart succeeded Senator Drummond, holding the seat for the Republicans.)	Rep	Rep Hold
35th	Vacancy upon Senator Drummond's resignation.		Joseph Dysart	Rep	Rep Hold
40th (Note: The fortieth district transitioned from a 1- to 2-member district at the time. Senator Powers was a holdover incumbent not up for re-election.)	Newly created subdistrict		George W. Howard	Rep	Rep Gain
42nd (Note: The forty-second district was a newly created 1-member district at the time.)	Newly created district		Martin V. Burdick	Rep	Rep Gain
43rd (Note: The forty-third district was a newly created 1-member district at the time.)	Newly created district		Sherman Griswold Smith	Rep	Rep Gain

== Detailed results ==
- NOTE: The Iowa General Assembly does not provide detailed vote totals for Iowa State Senate elections in 1861.

== See also ==
- Elections in Iowa
