= 1863 Iowa Senate election =

- 1863

34 out of 46 seats in the Iowa State Senate 24 seats needed for a majority
| | Majority party | Minority party |
|---|---|---|
| Party | Republican | Democratic |
| Last election | 33 | 16 |
| Seats before | 31 (Note: Following the 1861 Iowa Senate election, Republicans held 33 seats to Democrats' 16. However, three changes occurred during the ninth general assembly. In the third district, Democratic Senator Cyrus Bussey resigned on January 18, 1862, causing a vacancy in his seat. Democrat James Pollard succeeded Senator Bussey, holding the seat for the Democrats. In the sixth district, Republican Senator James Conrad Hagans died on September 7, 1863, causing a vacancy in his seat. The sixth district seat was left vacant until the next election. In the forty-first district, Republican Senator John Scott resigned on January 18, 1862, causing a vacancy in his seat. Democrat Edwin B. Potter succeeded Senator Scott, flipping the seat to Democratic control. Therefore, by election day in 1863, the Republicans held 31 seats, the Democrats held 17 seats, and one seat was vacant (the seat that had been held by Republican Senator Hagans).) | 17 |
| Seats after | 41 (Note: The Iowa Senate decreased from 49 seats to 46 seats following the 1863 general election.) | 5 |
| Seat change | ▲10 | ▼12 |
President of the Iowa Senate (Note: Article IV, section 18, of the Constitution of Iowa at that time established that the Lieutenant Governor of Iowa shall perform the duties of the President of the Senate. The Lieutenant Governor performed the duties of President of the Senate from January 11, 1858 through January 14, 1991. As of 1991, duties of Iowa's Lieutenant Governor no longer include presiding over the state Senate.) before election
John R. Needham (Note: As Lieutenant Governor, John R. Needham was the tenth President of the Iowa Senate. He served during the ninth Iowa General Assembly, succeeding Republican Nicholas J. Rusch in that leadership position.)
Republican
Elected President of the Iowa Senate
Enoch W. Eastman (Note: As the next Lieutenant Governor, Enoch W. Eastman was the eleventh President of the Iowa Senate. He served during the tenth Iowa General Assembly, succeeding Republican John R. Needham in that leadership position.)
Republican

In the 1863 Iowa State Senate elections, Iowa voters elected state senators to serve in the tenth Iowa General Assembly. Following the downsizing of the Iowa Senate from 49 to 46 seats in 1863, elections were held for 34 of the state senate's 46 seats. (Note: At the time, the Iowa Senate had several multi-member districts.) State senators serve four-year terms in the Iowa State Senate.

The general election took place in 1863.

Following the previous election in 1861, Republicans had control of the Iowa Senate with 33 seats to Democrats' 16 seats. However, three changes occurred during the ninth general assembly. In the third district, Democratic Senator Cyrus Bussey resigned on January 18, 1862, causing a vacancy in his seat. Democrat James Pollard succeeded Senator Bussey, holding the seat for the Democrats. In the sixth district, Republican Senator James Conrad Hagans died on September 7, 1863, causing a vacancy in his seat. The sixth district seat was left vacant until the next election. In the forty-first district, Republican Senator John Scott resigned on January 18, 1862, causing a vacancy in his seat. Democrat Edwin B. Potter succeeded Senator Scott, flipping the seat to Democratic control. Therefore, by election day in 1863, the Republicans held 31 seats, the Democrats held 17 seats, and one seat was vacant (the seat that had been held by Republican Senator Hagans).

To claim control of the chamber from Republicans, the Democrats needed to net seven Senate seats.

Republicans maintained control of the Iowa State Senate following the election with the balance of power shifting to Republicans holding 41 seats and Democrats having five seats (a net gain of 10 seats for Republicans).

== Summary of Results ==
- Note: The holdover Senators not up for re-election are not listed on this table.

| Senate District | Incumbent | Party | Elected Senator | Party | Outcome |
|---|---|---|---|---|---|
| 3rd (Note: The third district was a 1-member district at the time.) | Cyrus Bussey (Note: In the third district, Democratic Senator Cyrus Bussey resigned on January 18, 1862, causing a vacancy in his seat.) | Dem | Samuel Alphonso Moore | Rep | Rep Gain |
| 3rd | James Pollard (Note: Democrat James Pollard succeeded Senator Bussey, holding the seat for the Democrats.) | Dem | Samuel Alphonso Moore | Rep | Rep Gain |
| 4th (Note: The fourth district was a 1-member district at the time.) | Nathan Udell | Dem | Nathan Udell | Dem | Dem Hold |
| 5th (Note: The fifth district transitioned from a 2- to 1-member district.) | Elijah F. Esteb | Dem | Ziba Brown | Rep | Rep Gain |
| 5th | William E. Taylor (Note: Senator William E. Taylor was an incumbent who was up for re-election. He was redistricted from district 5 to 6.) | Dem | Obsolete subdistrict | | |
| 6th (Note: The sixth district was a 1-member district at the time.) | James Conrad Hagans (Note: In the sixth district, Republican Senator James Conrad Hagans died on September 7, 1863, causing a vacancy in his seat. The sixth district seat was left vacant until the next election.) | Rep | C. G. Bridges | Rep | Rep Hold |
| 6th | Vacancy upon Senator Hagans' death. | | C. G. Bridges | Rep | Rep Hold |
| 7th (Note: The seventh district was a 1-member district at the time.) | Harvey W. English | Dem | L. W. Hillyer | Rep | Rep Gain |
| 8th (Note: The eighth district was a 1-member district at the time.) | John G. Foote (Note: Senator Foote was an incumbent holdover senator not up for re-election. Instead, he was redistricted from district 8 to 9.) | Rep | Lewis Williams Ross | Rep | Rep Hold |
| 9th (Note: The ninth district was a 1-member district at the time.) | Theron Webb Woolson (Note: Senator Woolson was an incumbent holdover senator not up for re-election. Instead, he was redistricted from district 9 to 10.) | Rep | John G. Foote | Rep | Rep Hold |
| 10th (Note: The tenth district was a 1-member district at the time.) | Joshua Monroe Shaffer | Rep | Theron Webb Woolson | Rep | Rep Hold |
| 11th (Note: The eleventh district was a 1-member district at the time.) | Jacob W. Dixon (Note: Senator Dixon was an incumbent holdover senator not up for re-election. Instead, he was redistricted from district 11 to 12.) | Rep | Daniel P. Stubbs | Rep | Rep Hold |
| 12th (Note: The twelfth district was a 1-member district at the time.) | Warren S. Dungan | Rep | Jacob W. Dixon | Rep | Rep Hold |
| 13th (Note: The thirteenth district was a 1-member district at the time.) | James Simpson Hurley (Note: Senator Hurley was an incumbent holdover senator not up for re-election. Instead, he was redistricted from district 13 to 14.) | Rep | William Castlebury Shippen | Rep | Rep Hold |
| 14th (Note: The fourteenth district was a 1-member district at the time.) | William G. Woodward | Rep | James Simpson Hurley | Rep | Rep Hold |
| 15th (Note: The fifteenth district was a 1-member district at the time.) | William B. Lewis | Rep | John Abbott Parvin | Rep | Rep Hold |
| 16th (Note: The sixteenth district was a 1-member district at the time.) | Isaac Pearl Teter | Rep | John Ferguson McJunkin | Rep | Rep Hold |
| 17th (Note: The seventeenth district was a 1-member district at the time.) | Henry H. Williams | Dem | John Chrisfield Hogin | Rep | Rep Gain |
| 18th (Note: The eighteenth district was a 1-member district at the time.) | Jairus Edward Neal | Dem | J. A. L. Crookham | Rep | Rep Gain |
| 19th (Note: The nineteenth district transitioned from a 2- to 1-member district.) | Joseph B. Leake (Note: Senator Leake was an incumbent who was up for re-election. He was redistricted from district 19 to 22.) | Rep | Thomas McMillan | Rep | Rep Hold |
| 19th | Benjamin F. Gue (Note: Senator Gue was an incumbent holdover senator not up for re-election. Instead, he was redistricted from district 19 to 22.) | Rep | Obsolete subdistrict | | |
| 20th (Note: The twentieth district was a 1-member district at the time.) | Norman Boardman (Note: Senator Boardman was an incumbent holdover senator not up for re-election. Instead, he was redistricted from district 20 to 23.) | Rep | Philo Gould Camp Merrill | Rep | Rep Hold |
| 21st (Note: The twenty-first district was a 1-member district at the time.) | John M. Kent | Rep | Benjamin F. Roberts | Rep | Rep Hold |
| 22nd (Note: The twenty-second district transitioned from a 1- to 2-member district at the time.) | Jesse Bowen | Rep | Benjamin F. Gue | Rep | Rep Hold |
| 22nd | Newly created subdistrict | | Thomas Jefferson Saunders | Rep | Rep Gain |
| 23rd (Note: The twenty-third district was a 1-member district at the time.) | Joshua H. Hatch (Note: Senator Hatch was an incumbent holdover senator not up for re-election. Instead, he was redistricted from district 23 to 28.) | Rep | Norman Boardman | Rep | Rep Hold |
| 24th (Note: The twenty-fourth district was a 1-member district at the time.) | George F. Green | Dem | Henry Wharton | Rep | Rep Gain |
| 25th (Note: The twenty-fifth district was a 1-member district at the time.) | William H. Holmes | Rep | Ezekiel Clark | Rep | Rep Hold |
| 26th (Note: The twenty-sixth district was a 1-member district at the time.) | H. Gates Angle | Rep | Marsena Edgar Cutts | Rep | Rep Hold |
| 27th (Note: The twenty-seventh district transitioned from a 2- to 1-member district.) | George W. Trumbull (Note: Senator Trumbull was an incumbent who was up for re-election. He was redistricted from district 27 to 34.) | Dem | Elisha Flaugh | Rep | Rep Gain |
| 27th | John D. Jennings (Note: Senator Jennings was an incumbent holdover senator not up for re-election. Instead, he was redistricted from district 27 to 34.) | Dem | Obsolete subdistrict | | |
| 28th (Note: The twenty-eighth district was a 1-member district at the time.) | David Hammer | Dem | Joshua H. Hatch | Rep | Rep Gain |
| 29th (Note: The twenty-ninth district transitioned from a 2- to 1-member district.) | John Kern (Note: Senator Kern was an incumbent who was up for re-election. He was redistricted from district 29 to 20.) | Dem | John Hilsinger | Rep | Rep Gain |
| 29th | Paris Perrin Henderson (Note: Senator Henderson was an incumbent who was up for re-election. He was redistricted from district 29 to 20.) | Rep | Obsolete subdistrict | | |
| 30th (Note: The thirtieth district was a 1-member district at the time.) | Marquis Lafayette McPherson | Rep | Ezekiel Cutler | Rep | Rep Hold |
| 31st (Note: The thirty-first district was a 1-member district at the time.) | James Redfield | Rep | Joseph Barris Young | Rep | Rep Hold |
| 32nd (Note: The thirty-second district was a 1-member district at the time.) | John F. Duncombe | Dem | William B. King | Rep | Rep Gain |
| 33rd (Note: The thirty-third district was a 1-member district at the time.) | Joseph J. Watson | Rep | Henry Clay Henderson | Rep | Rep Hold |
| 34th (Note: The thirty-fourth district transitioned from a 1- to 2-member district at the time.) | Andrew Mateer Pattison | Rep | John D. Jennings | Dem | Dem Gain |
| 34th | Newly created subdistrict | | Frederick M. Knoll | Dem | Dem Gain |
| 35th (Note: The thirty-fifth district was a 1-member district at the time.) | Joseph Dysart | Rep | John M. Brayton | Rep | Rep Hold |
| 36th (Note: The thirty-sixth district was a 1-member district at the time.) | Alfred Francis Brown | Rep | Leonard Wells Hart | Rep | Rep Hold |
| 37th (Note: The thirty-seventh district was a 1-member district at the time.) | David C. Hastings | Rep | Benjamin T. Hunt | Rep | Rep Hold |
| 38th (Note: The thirty-eighth district was a 1-member district at the time.) | Lucien Lester Ainsworth | Dem | Harvey Southmit Brunson | Rep | Rep Gain |
| 39th (Note: The thirty-ninth district was a 1-member district at the time.) | George W. Gray (Note: Senator Gray was an incumbent who was up for re-election. He was redistricted from district 39 to 40.) | Dem | Coker F. Clarkson | Rep | Rep Gain |
| 40th (Note: The fortieth district transitioned from a 2- to 1-member district.) | George W. Howard | Rep | George W. Gray | Dem | Dem Gain |
| 40th | Julius Henry Powers | Rep | Obsolete subdistrict | | |
| 41st (Note: The forty-first district was a 1-member district at the time.) | John Scott (Note: In the forty-first district, Republican Senator John Scott resigned on January 18, 1862, causing a vacancy in his seat.) | Rep | Martin V. Burdick (Note: Senator Burdick was an incumbent holdover senator not up for re-election. Instead, he was redistricted from district 42 to 41.) | Rep | Rep Gain |
| 41st | Edwin B. Potter (Note: Democrat Edwin B. Potter succeeded Senator Scott, flipping the seat to Democratic control.) | Dem | Martin V. Burdick | Rep | Rep Gain |
| 42nd (Note: The forty-second district was a 1-member district at the time.) | Martin V. Burdick | Rep | John G. Patterson | Rep | Rep Hold |
| 43rd (Note: The forty-third district was a 1-member district at the time.) | Sherman Griswold Smith | Rep | George W. Bassett | Rep | Rep Hold |

== Detailed Results ==
- NOTE: The Iowa General Assembly does not provide detailed vote totals for Iowa State Senate elections in 1863.

== See also ==
- Elections in Iowa
