= 1859 Iowa Senate election =

- 1859

27 out of 43 seats in the Iowa State Senate 22 seats needed for a majority
	Majority party	Minority party
Party	Republican	Democratic
Last election	22	14
Seats after	22 (Note: The Iowa Senate expanded from 36 seats to 43 seats following the 1859 general election.)	21
Seat change	Steady	▲7
President of the Iowa Senate (Note: Article IV, section 18, of the Constitution of Iowa at that time established that the Lieutenant Governor of Iowa shall perform the duties of the President of the Senate. The Lieutenant Governor performed the duties of President of the Senate from January 11, 1858 through January 14, 1991. As of 1991, duties of Iowa's Lieutenant Governor no longer include presiding over the state Senate.) before election
Oran Faville (Note: As Lieutenant Governor, Oran Faville was the eighth President of the Iowa Senate. He served during the seventh Iowa General Assembly, succeeding Republican Senator William W. Hamilton in that leadership position.)
Republican
Elected President of the Iowa Senate
Nicholas J. Rusch (Note: As the next Lieutenant Governor, Nicholas J. Rusch was the ninth President of the Iowa Senate. He served during the eighth Iowa General Assembly, succeeding Republican Oran Faville in that leadership position.)
Republican

In the 1859 Iowa State Senate elections, Iowa voters elected state senators to serve in the eighth Iowa General Assembly. Following the expansion of the Iowa Senate from 36 to 43 seats in 1859, elections were held for 27 of the state senate's 43 seats. (Note: At the time, the Iowa Senate had several multi-member districts.) State senators serve four-year terms in the Iowa State Senate.

The general election took place in 1859.

Following the previous election in 1857, Republicans had control of the Iowa Senate with 22 seats to Democrats' 14 seats.

To claim control of the chamber from Republicans, the Democrats needed to net eight Senate seats.

Republicans maintained control of the Iowa State Senate following the election with the balance of power shifting to Republicans holding 22 seats and Democrats having 21 seats (a net gain of 7 seats for Democrats).

== Summary of Results ==
- Note: The holdover Senators not up for re-election are not listed on this table.

Senate District	Incumbent	Party	Elected Senator	Party	Outcome
1st (Note: The first was a 2-member district at the time. However, only one of the seats in the district was contested in the election. The other was held by a holdover senator not up for re-election.)	John R. Allen	Dem	Valentine Buechel	Dem	Dem Hold
2nd (Note: The second district was a 1-member district at the time.)	David Trowbridge Brigham	Dem	Gideon Smith Bailey (Note: Senator Bailey was an incumbent holdover senator not up for re-election. Instead, he was redistricted from district 3 to 2.)	Dem	Dem Hold
3rd (Note: The third district was a 1-member district at the time.)	Gideon Smith Bailey	Dem	Cyrus Bussey	Dem	Dem Hold
4th (Note: The fourth district transitioned from a 2- to 1-member district.)	Lyman Cook	Rep	Nathan Udell	Dem	Dem Gain
4th	William Findlay Coolbaugh (Note: Senator Coolbaugh was an incumbent holdover senator not up for re-election. Instead, he was redistricted from district 4 to 8.)	Dem	Obsolete subdistrict		
5th (Note: The fifth district was a 1-member district at the time.)	Henry Hoffman Trimble	Dem	William E. Taylor	Dem	Dem Hold
6th (Note: The sixth district was a 1-member district at the time.)	William M. Reed	Rep	James Conrad Hagans	Rep	Rep Hold
7th (Note: The seventh district was a 1-member district at the time.)	Alvin Saunders (Note: Senator Saunders was an incumbent holdover senator not up for re-election. Instead, he was redistricted from district 7 to 9. During the next term, Senator Saunders resigned on May 14, 1861, causing a vacancy in his seat.)	Rep	Harvey W. English	Dem	Dem Gain
8th (Note: The eighth district was a 1-member district at the time.)	John A. Johnson (Note: Senator Johnson was an incumbent holdover senator not up for re-election. Instead, he was redistricted from district 8 to 11.)	Dem	William Findlay Coolbaugh	Dem	Dem Hold
9th (Note: The ninth district was a 1-member district at the time.)	Daniel A. Anderson (Note: Senator Anderson was an incumbent holdover senator not up for re-election. Instead, he was redistricted from district 9 to 12.)	Rep	Alvin Saunders	Rep	Rep Hold
10th (Note: The tenth district was a 1-member district at the time.)	John Wesley Warner	Dem	James Falconer Wilson (Note: During the next term, Senator Wilson resigned on October 7, 1861, causing a vacancy in his seat.)	Rep	Rep Gain
11th (Note: The eleventh district was a 1-member district at the time.)	Samuel Dale	Dem	John A. Johnson	Dem	Dem Hold
12th (Note: The twelfth district was a 1-member district at the time.)	William H. M. Pusey (Note: Senator Pusey was an incumbent holdover senator not up for re-election. Instead, he was redistricted from district 12 to 31.)	Dem	Daniel A. Anderson	Rep	Rep Gain
14th (Note: The fourteenth district was a 1-member district at the time.)	Charles Foster	Rep	Andrew Oliphant Patterson (Note: Senator Patterson was an incumbent holdover senator not up for re-election. Instead, he was redistricted from district 19 to 14. During the next term, Senator Patterson resigned on May 14, 1861, causing a vacancy in his seat.)	Dem	Dem Gain
15th (Note: The fifteenth district was a 1-member district at the time.)	Oliver P. Sherraden (Note: Senator Sherraden was an incumbent holdover senator not up for re-election. Instead, he was redistricted from district 15 to 16.)	Rep	William B. Lewis	Dem	Dem Gain
16th (Note: The sixteenth district was a 1-member district at the time.)	William A. Loughridge	Rep	Oliver P. Sherraden	Rep	Rep Hold
17th (Note: The seventeenth district was a 1-member district at the time.)	Jairus Edward Neal (Note: Senator Neal was an incumbent holdover senator not up for re-election. Instead, he was redistricted from district 17 to 18.)	Dem	Henry H. Williams	Dem	Dem Hold
18th (Note: The eighteenth district was a 1-member district at the time.)	Marquis Lafayette McPherson (Note: Senator McPherson was an incumbent holdover senator not up for re-election. Instead, he was redistricted from district 18 to 30.)	Rep	Jairus Edward Neal	Dem	Dem Gain
19th (Note: The nineteenth district was a 1-member district at the time.)	Andrew Oliphant Patterson	Dem	John W. Thompson	Rep	Rep Gain
20th (Note: The twentieth district was a 1-member district at the time.)	Samuel Jordan Kirkwood	Rep	George M. Davis (Note: Senator Davis was an incumbent holdover senator not up for re-election. Instead, he was redistricted from district 23 to 20.)	Rep	Rep Hold
21st (Note: The twenty-first district was a 1-member district at the time.)	Nicholas John Rusch	Rep	John M. Kent	Rep	Rep Hold
22nd (Note: The twenty-second district was a 1-member district at the time.)	Jonathan Wright Cattell	Rep	Jesse Bowen	Rep	Rep Hold
23rd (Note: The twenty-third district was a 1-member district at the time.)	George M. Davis	Rep	William P. Davis (Note: Senator Davis was an incumbent holdover senator not up for re-election. Instead, he was redistricted from district 27 to 23.)	Rep	Rep Hold
24th (Note: The twenty-fourth district was a 1-member district at the time.)	William George Thompson	Rep	George F. Green	Dem	Dem Gain
25th (Note: The twenty-fifth district was a 1-member district at the time.)	George McCoy	Rep	Joseph Mann (Note: Senator Mann was an incumbent holdover senator not up for re-election. Instead, he was redistricted from district 29 to 25.)	Dem	Dem Gain
26th (Note: The twenty-sixth district was a 1-member district at the time.)	Josiah Bushnell Grinnell	Rep	H. Gates Angle	Rep	Rep Hold
27th (Note: The twenty-seventh district transitioned from a 1- to 2-member district.)	William P. Davis	Rep	David S. Wilson (Note: Senator Wilson was an incumbent holdover senator not up for re-election. Instead, he was redistricted from district 31 to 27.)	Dem	Dem Gain
27th	Newly created subdistrict		George W. Trumbull	Dem	Dem Gain
28th (Note: The twenty-eighth district was a 1-member district at the time.)	Jeremiah W. Jenkins	Rep	David Hammer	Dem	Dem Gain
29th (Note: The twenty-ninth district was a 1-member district at the time.)	Joseph Mann	Dem	Paris Perrin Henderson	Rep	Rep Gain
30th (Note: The thirtieth district was a 1-member district at the time.)	William G. Stewart	Dem	Marquis Lafayette McPherson	Rep	Rep Gain
31st (Note: The thirty-first district was a 1-member district at the time.)	David S. Wilson	Dem	William H.M. Pusey	Dem	Dem Hold
32nd (Note: The thirty-second district was a 1-member district at the time.)	Henry B. Carter	Rep	John F. Duncombe	Dem	Dem Gain
33rd (Note: The thirty-third district was a 1-member district at the time.)	Aaron Brown	Rep	Joseph J. Watson	Rep	Rep Hold
34th (Note: The thirty-fourth district was a 1-member district at the time.)	Jeremiah T. Atkins	Rep	Andrew Mateer Pattison	Rep	Rep Hold
35th (Note: The thirty-fifth district was a newly created 1-member district at the time.)	Newly created district		Thomas Drummond (Note: During the next term, Senator Drummond resigned on May 14, 1861, causing a vacancy in his seat.)	Rep	Rep Gain
36th (Note: The thirty-sixth district was a newly created 1-member district at the time.)	Newly created district		Alfred Francis Brown	Rep	Rep Gain
37th (Note: The thirty-seventh district was a newly created 1-member district at the time.)	Newly created district		David C. Hastings	Rep	Rep Gain
38th (Note: The thirty-eighth district was a newly created 1-member district at the time.)	Newly created district		Lucien Lester Ainsworth	Dem	Dem Gain
39th (Note: The thirty-ninth district was a newly created 1-member district at the time.)	Newly created district		George W. Gray	Dem	Dem Gain
40th (Note: The fortieth district was a newly created 1-member district at the time.)	Newly created district		Julius Henry Powers	Rep	Rep Gain
41st (Note: The forty-first district was a newly created 1-member district at the time.)	Newly created district		John Scott	Rep	Rep Gain

== Detailed Results ==
- NOTE: The Iowa General Assembly does not provide detailed vote totals for Iowa State Senate elections in 1859.

== See also ==
- Elections in Iowa
