= 1865 Iowa Senate election =

- 1865

23 out of 48 seats in the Iowa State Senate 25 seats needed for a majority
	Majority party	Minority party
Party	Republican	Democratic
Last election	41	5
Seats after	42 (Note: The Iowa Senate expanded from 46 seats to 48 seats following the 1865 general election.)	6
Seat change	▲1	▲1
President of the Iowa Senate (Note: Article IV, section 18, of the Constitution of Iowa at that time established that the Lieutenant Governor of Iowa shall perform the duties of the President of the Senate. The Lieutenant Governor performed the duties of President of the Senate from January 11, 1858 through January 14, 1991. As of 1991, duties of Iowa's Lieutenant Governor no longer include presiding over the state Senate.) before election
Enoch W. Eastman (Note: As Lieutenant Governor, Enoch W. Eastman was the eleventh President of the Iowa Senate. He served during the tenth Iowa General Assembly, succeeding Republican John R. Needham in that leadership position.)
Republican
Elected President of the Iowa Senate
Benjamin F. Gue (Note: As the next Lieutenant Governor, Benjamin F. Gue was the twelfth President of the Iowa Senate. He served during the eleventh Iowa General Assembly, succeeding Republican Enoch W. Eastman in that leadership position.)
Republican

In the 1865 Iowa State Senate elections, Iowa voters elected state senators to serve in the eleventh Iowa General Assembly. Following the expansion of the Iowa Senate from 46 to 48 seats in 1865, elections were held for 23 of the state senate's 48 seats. (Note: At the time, the Iowa Senate had several multi-member districts.) State senators serve four-year terms in the Iowa State Senate.

The general election took place in 1865.

Following the previous election in 1863, Republicans had control of the Iowa Senate with 41 seats to Democrats' five seats.

To claim control of the chamber from Republicans, the Democrats needed to net 20 Senate seats.

Republicans maintained control of the Iowa State Senate following the election with the balance of power shifting to Republicans holding 42 seats and Democrats having six seats (a net gain of 1 seat each for Republicans and Democrats).

== Summary of Results ==
- Note: The holdover Senators not up for re-election are not listed on this table.

Senate District	Incumbent	Party	Elected Senator	Party	Outcome
1st (Note: The first was a 2-member district at the time.)	Frederick Hesser	Dem	Nathaniel Gates Hedges	Dem	Dem Hold
1st	George Washington McCrary	Rep	Joseph Hollman	Dem	Dem Gain
2nd (Note: The second district was a 1-member district at the time.)	Abner Harrison McCrary	Rep	Eliab Doud	Rep	Rep Hold
5th (Note: The fifth district was a 1-member district at the time.)	Ziba Brown	Rep	Eugene Edgar Edwards	Rep	Rep Hold
9th (Note: The ninth district was a 1-member district at the time.)	John G. Foote	Rep	Fitz Henry Warren	Rep	Rep Hold
10th (Note: The tenth district was a 1-member district at the time.)	Theron Webb Woolson	Rep	Theron Webb Woolson	Rep	Rep Hold
12th (Note: The twelfth district was a 1-member district at the time.)	Jacob W. Dixon	Rep	Edward Holcomb Stiles	Rep	Rep Hold
14th (Note: The fourteenth district was a 1-member district at the time.)	James Simpson Hurley	Rep	James M. Robertson	Rep	Rep Hold
17th (Note: The seventeenth district was a 1-member district at the time.)	John Chrisfield Hogin	Rep	Ezekiel Silas Sampson	Rep	Rep Hold
20th (Note: The twentieth district was a 1-member district at the time.)	Philo Gould Camp Merrill	Rep	William McMarshman	Rep	Rep Hold
21st (Note: The twenty-first district was a 1-member district at the time.)	Benjamin F. Roberts	Rep	Joseph Rea Reed	Rep	Rep Hold
22nd (Note: The twenty-second district was a 2-member district at the time.)	Benjamin F. Gue	Rep	Andrew McCune Larimer	Rep	Rep Hold
22nd	Thomas Jefferson Saunders	Rep	Joseph B. Leake	Rep	Rep Hold
23rd (Note: The twenty-third district was a 1-member district at the time.)	Norman Boardman	Rep	John Henry Smith	Rep	Rep Hold
27th (Note: The twenty-seventh district was a 1-member district at the time.)	Elisha Flaugh	Rep	John Meyer	Rep	Rep Hold
28th (Note: The twenty-eighth district was a 1-member district at the time.)	Joshua H. Hatch	Rep	Jonathan Wright Cattell	Rep	Rep Hold
30th (Note: The thirtieth district was a 1-member district at the time.)	Ezekiel Cutler	Rep	Sewall Spaulding Farwell	Rep	Rep Hold
34th (Note: The thirty-fourth district was a 2-member district at the time. However, Senator Knoll was a holdover incumbent and not up for re-election.)	John D. Jennings	Dem	Benjamin Billings Richards	Dem	Dem Hold
38th (Note: The thirty-eighth district was a 1-member district at the time.)	Harvey Southmit Brunson	Rep	William Benjamin Lakin	Rep	Rep Hold
40th (Note: The fortieth district was a 1-member district at the time.)	George W. Gray	Dem	James B. Powers	Rep	Rep Gain
41st (Note: The forty-first district was a 1-member district at the time.)	Martin V. Burdick	Rep	Charles Paulk	Dem	Dem Gain
42nd (Note: The forty-second district was a 1-member district at the time.)	John G. Patterson (Note: Senator Patterson was an incumbent holdover senator not up for re-election. Instead, he was redistricted from district 42 to 43.)	Rep	Henry Clay Bulis	Rep	Rep Hold
43rd (Note: The forty-third district was a 1-member district at the time.)	George W. Bassett (Note: Senator Bassett was an incumbent holdover senator not up for re-election. Instead, he was redistricted from district 43 to 44.)	Rep	John G. Patterson	Rep	Rep Hold
44th (Note: The forty-fourth district was a newly created 1-member district at the time.)	Newly created district		George W. Bassett	Rep	Rep Gain
45th (Note: The forty-fifth district was a newly created 1-member district at the time.)	Newly created district		Addison Oliver	Rep	Rep Gain

== Detailed Results ==
- NOTE: The Iowa General Assembly does not provide detailed vote totals for Iowa State Senate elections in 1865.

== See also ==
- Elections in Iowa
