= Senator Kern (disambiguation) =

John W. Kern (1849–1917) was a U.S. Senator from Indiana from 1911 to 1917. Senator Kern may also refer to:

- Charles B. Kern (1867–1942), Iowa State Senate, son of John Kern
- John Kern (Iowa politician) (1833–1889), Iowa State Senate
- Spencer Kern (fl. 2020s), Oklahoma State Senate

== See also ==
- Senator Kernan (disambiguation)
- Hiram O. Kerns (1853–1931), Virginia State Senate
