= Faville =

Faville is a surname of English origin. Notable people with the surname include:

- Frederick F. Faville (1865–1954), American judge and lawyer
- Oran Faville (1817–1872), American politician
- Roy Faville (1908–1980), British Royal Air Force officer
- William Baker Faville (1866–1946), American architect

== See also ==
- Favilli, another surname
