= John Kern =

John Kern may refer to:

- John Kern (Iowa politician) (1833–1889), member of the Iowa Senate
- John W. Kern (1849–1917), American Democratic politician from Indiana
- John W. Kern Jr. (1900–1971), mayor of the city of Indianapolis, Indiana
- John W. Kern III (1928–2018), judge of the District of Columbia Court of Appeals
- John Kern (chef), Dutch Michelin starred chef of De Hooge Heerlijkheid
