= Daniel P. Stubbs =

American newspaper editor, educator, politician, and lawyer (1829–1905)

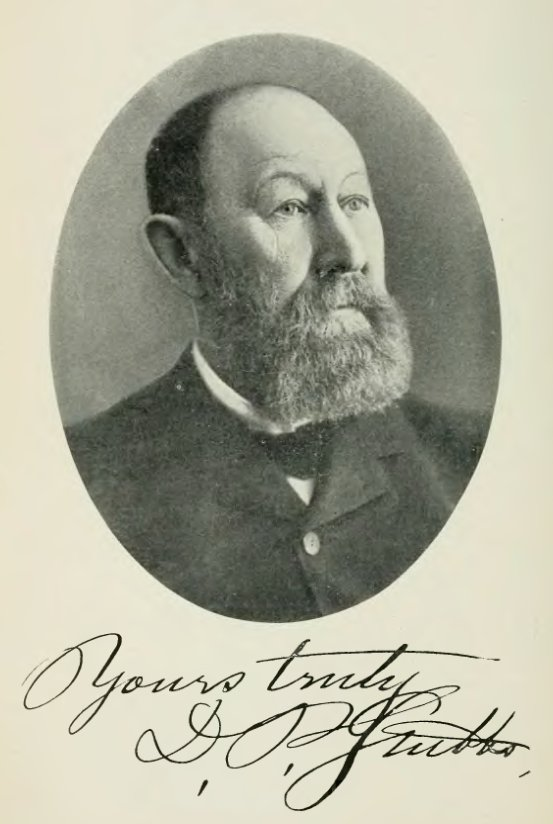
- Portrait of Stubbs published in the History of Iowa From the Earliest Times to the Beginning of the Twentieth Century

Member of the Iowa Senate from the 11th district
- In office January 11, 1864 – January 12, 1868
- Preceded by: Jacob W. Dixon
- Succeeded by: Theron Webb Woolson

Personal details
- Born: Daniel Parham Stubbs; July 7, 1829 Preble County, Ohio, U.S.
- Died: May 2, 1905 (aged 75) Wells-Stubbs House, Fairfield, Iowa, U.S.
- Party: Liberty (before 1865); Republican (1865–early 1870s); Greenback (late 1870s–early 1880s)
- Spouse: Carrie Hollingsworth (m. 1855)
- Children: 4
- Occupation: Lawyer; politician; educator; newspaper editor

Daniel Parham Stubbs (July 7, 1829 – May 2, 1905) was an American politician.

== Family and personal life ==
The Stubbs and Parham families were of English descent, and both lived in Georgia until the Stubbses, Quakers opposed to slavery, relocated to Ohio in 1805. William Stubbs and his future wife Delilah Parham were both born in Appling County, Georgia. Parham's father served in the American Revolutionary War, and was present at the Siege of Yorktown.

Daniel Parham Stubbs was born on July 7, 1829, and raised on the family farm in Preble County, Ohio. He attended local schools, as well as Union County Academy in the neighboring Union County, Indiana. He began teaching in 1853, and was named principal of the academy for 1854, serving through 1855. During his teaching career, Stubbs read law, and completed his legal education at Asbury University in 1856. He then began practicing law and concurrently served as editor of the Union County Herald. He moved to Fairfield, Iowa, in 1857, and practiced law in partnership with James F. Wilson for five years, then alone thereafter. The Wells-Stubbs House was built in Fairfield in 1874, and Stubbs lived there from 1877 until his death on May 2, 1905. Stubbs and his wife Carrie Hollingsworth married in 1855. The couple raised four children, three of whom survived him.

== Political career ==
Stubbs left the Liberty Party in 1856 to join the Republican Party. He won his first political office, the mayoralty of Fairfield, in 1859, and won a second term the following year. Stubbs was then elected to the Iowa Senate in 1863 as a Republican. Stubbs represented District 11 from January 11, 1864, to January 12, 1868, and attended the 1864 National Union National Convention. During the 1872 presidential election, Stubbs supported Liberal Republican Party candidate Horace Greeley. Stubbs was nominated by the Greenback Party to run in the 1877 Iowa gubernatorial election, finishing third of four candidates. He also received the Greenback nomination for the 1880 United States House of Representatives election in Iowa's 1st congressional district, and the 1882 United States Senate elections in Iowa.
