= Senator Drummond =

Senator Drummond may refer to:

- John W. Drummond (1919–2016), South Carolina State Senate
- Josiah Hayden Drummond (1827–1902), Maine State Senate
- Thomas Drummond (politician) (1833–1865), Iowa State Senate
