= Favilli =

Favilli is a surname. Notable people with the surname include:

- Andrea Favilli (sculptor) (born 1963), American sculptor
- Andrea Favilli (footballer) (born 1997), Italian footballer
- Elena Favilli (born 1982), Italian-American author, speaker, and media entrepreneur
- Elia Favilli (born 1989), Italian road bicycle racer

== See also ==
- Faville, another surname
