= Wells-Stubbs House =

Historic house in Iowa, United States

- U.S. National Register of Historic Places
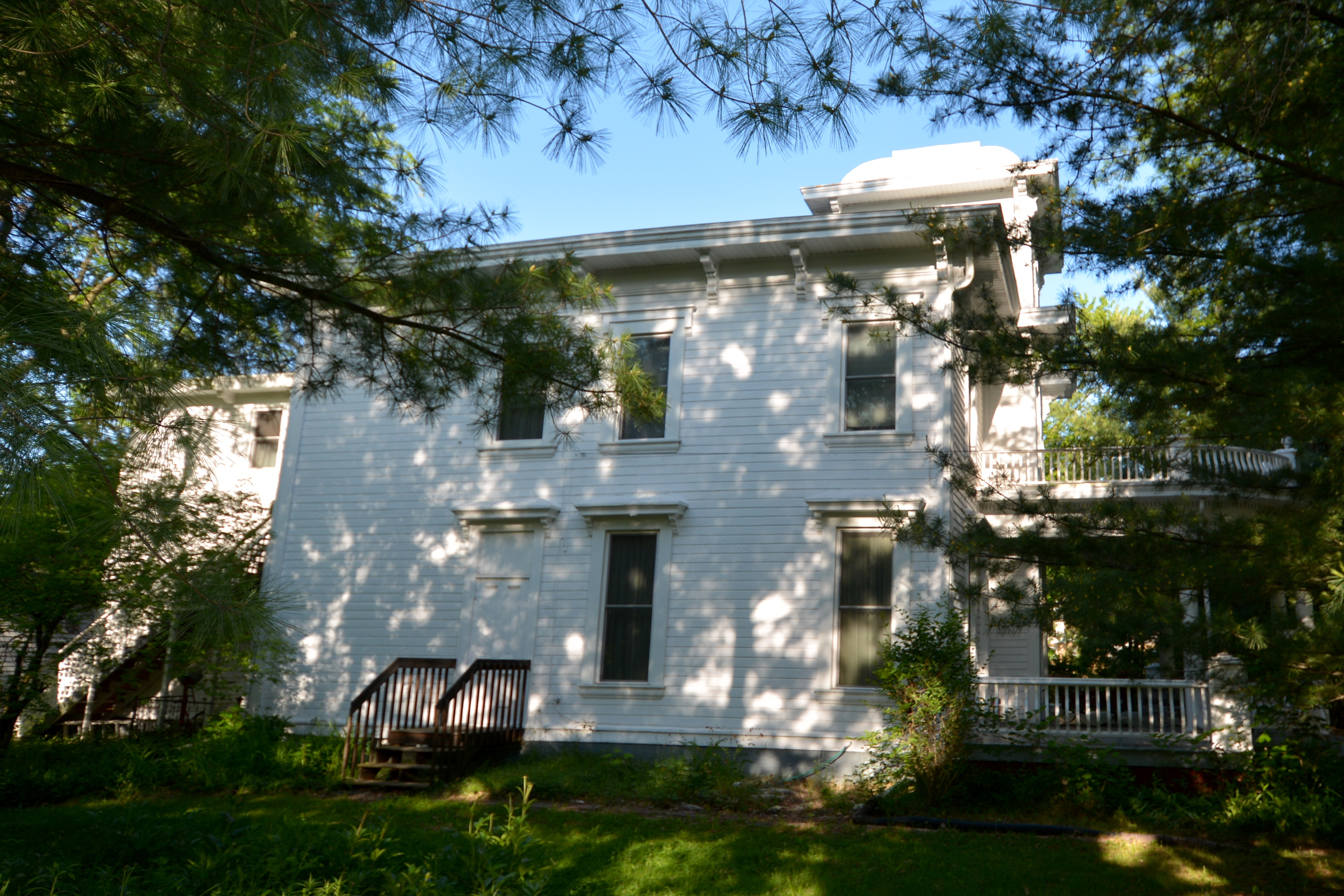

- Location within Iowa Location within the United States
- Location: 508 E. Burlington Ave. Fairfield, Iowa
- Coordinates: 41°0′22″N 91°57′20″W
- Area: less than one acre
- Built: 1874
- Architectural style: Italianate
- NRHP reference No.: 85003000
- Added to NRHP: October 10, 1985

The Wells-Stubbs House is a historic residence located in Fairfield, Iowa, United States. This house was built for George and Priscilla Wells in 1874. Its notoriety is derived from the residency of Daniel P. Stubbs, who lived here from 1877 to 1905. Stubbs was a leader in the Greenback Party in Iowa, and he served as their candidate for state and national offices. Early in his law career he was a partner with future congressman and Senator from Iowa, James F. Wilson. Stubbs was a successful defense attorney, as well as an attorney for the railroads. While still a Republican, he was elected mayor of Fairfield and to the Iowa Senate. He did not hold office as a Greenbacker.

The two-story, frame house was built in a vernacular form of the Italianate style. Stubbs added the Neoclassical details in a 1900 renovation. The bracketed eaves and the main entry in the center of the facade are original to the house, but the central location is an unusual feature for the vernacular forms in Fairfield where the entry is off-center. The prominent entry tower and porch were added in the 1900 renovation. The significance of the additions are increased by their association with Stubbs who wanted his house to have a stature equal to his own. In addition to the house the historic designation includes two outbuildings: a shed/summer kitchen near the rear porch and a barn near the rear property line. Both date from Stubb's time, and may predate his living here. They were all listed on the National Register of Historic Places in 1985.
