= 32nd Iowa Infantry Regiment =

- Iowa state flag
- Active: 6 October 1862 to 24 August 1865
- Country: United States
- Allegiance: Union
- Branch: Infantry
- Engagements: American Civil War: Red River Campaign; Battle of Pleasant Hill; Battle of Nashville

The 32nd Iowa Infantry Regiment was an infantry regiment that served in the Union Army during the American Civil War.

== Service ==
The 32nd Iowa Infantry was organized at Camp Franklin, Dubuque, Iowa and mustered in for three years of Federal service on 6 October 1862.

The regiment was mustered out on 24 August 1865.

== Total strength and casualties ==
A total of 1292 men served in the 32nd Iowa at one time or another during its existence. It suffered 6 officers and 101 enlisted men who were killed in action or who died of their wounds and 2 officers and 213 enlisted men who died of disease, for a total of 322 fatalities.

== Commanders ==
- Colonel John Scott
- Lieutenant Colonel Gustavus A. Eberhart

== Brief history in dates ==
Organized at Dubuque and mustered on 6 October 1862. Moved to Davenport, Iowa, 15–16 October; thence to St. Louis, Missouri, 21–23 November. Attached to District of Columbus, 13th Army Corps (Old), Dept. of Tennessee, to January, 1863. District of Columbus, 6th Division, 16th Army Corps, Dept. of Tennessee, to January, 1864. 2nd Brigade, 3rd Division, 16th Corps, to March, 1864. 2nd Brigade, 3rd Division, 16th Corps, Dept. of the Gulf, to June, 1864. 2nd Brigade, 3rd Division, 16th Corps, Dept. of Tennessee, to December, 1864. 2nd Brigade, 2nd Division (Detachment), Army of Tennessee, Dept. of the Cumberland, to February, 1865. 2nd Brigade, 2nd Division, 16th Corps, Military Division West Mississippi, to August, 1865.

SERVICE.---Companies "B," "C," "E," "H", "I" and "K" moved from St. Louis, Mo., to New Madrid, Mo., 25–28 November 1862, and duty there until 28 December. Expedition to Clarkston, Mo., 17–21 December (Cos. "C" and "I"). Evacuation of New Madrid 28 December, and moved to Fort Pillow, Tenn., 28–29 December. Duty there until 20 June 1863. (Co. "F" at Fulton 1 April to June.) Ordered to Columbus, Ky., 20 June, and duty there until 20 January 1864. Expedition to Rickman, Ky., 1 August 1863 (Cos. "B" and "I"). (Co. "C" mounted 1 July 1863, and attached to 4th Missouri Cavalry until 15 January 1864, when rejoined Regiment.) Companies "H," and "I" ordered to Island No. 10 1 September 1863. Action at Island No. 10 16 October (Cos. "H" and "I"). Expedition to Tiptonville 21 November (Co. "H"). All Companies moved to Vicksburg, Miss., 20–26 January 1864. Meridian Campaign 3 February-2 March. Meridian 16 February. Near Canton 27–28 February. Canton 28 February. Cos. "A," "D," "F" and "G" detached from Regiment and moved to Cape Girardeau, Mo., 25–28 November 1862. Attached to District of Southeast Missouri to July, 1863. Reserve Brigade, 1st Cavalry Division, Army of Southeast Missouri, to August, 1863. Reserve Brigade, 1st Cavalry Division, Arkansas Expedition, to December, 1863. 1st Brigade, 1st Cavalry Division, Dept. of Arkansas, to January, 1864.

SERVICE.--Garrison duty at Cape Girardeau, Mo., until 14 March 1863. Moved to Bloomfield 14 March and return to Cape Girardeau 21 April. Action at Cape Girardeau 28 April. Pursuit of Marmaduke to Castor 28 April-5 May. At Cape Girardeau until July. Moved to Bloomington 10 July, thence march to Clarendon, Ark., 19 July-8 August. Steele's Expedition to Little Rock 8 August-10 September. Expedition up White and Little Red Rivers 13–16 August. West Point, White River, 14 August. Harrison's Landing 16 August. Reed's Bridge, Bayou Metoe, 27 August. Shallow Ford, Bayou Metoe, 30 August. Bayou LaFourche and capture of Little Rock 10 September. Duty at Little Rock until January, 1864. Expedition to Mt. Ida 10–18 November 1863. Moved to Memphis, Tenn., 31 January-5 February 1864; thence to Vicksburg, Miss., 7–9 February, and duty there until March, when rejoined Regiment. (Red River Campaign 10 March-22 May 1864. Fort DeRussy 14 March. Battle of Pleasant Hill 9 April. Cane River Crossing 22–24 April. At Alexandria 26 April-13 May. Alexandria 2–9 May. Retreat to Morganza 13–20 April. Mansura 15–16 May. Mellow Bayou 18 May. Moved to Vicksburg, Miss., thence to Memphis, Tenn., 20 May-10 June. Lake Chicot, Ark., 6–7 June. Smith's Expedition to Tupelo, 5–21 July. Harrisburg 13 July. Tupelo 14–15 July. Old Town Creek 15 July. Smith's Expedition to Oxford, Miss., 1–30 August. Tallahatchie River 7–9 August. Abbeville 23 August. Moved to St. Louis, Mo., 16 September; thence to Desota, Mo., 25 September. March through Missouri in pursuit of Price 25 September-19 November. Moved to Nashville, Tenn., 21 November-1 December. Battles of Nashville, Tenn., 15–16 December. Pursuit of Hood 17–28 December. At Eastport, Miss., until February, 1865. Expedition from Eastport to Iuka 9 January 1865. Moved to New Orleans, La., 9–22 February; thence to Dauphin Island, Ala. Campaign against Mobile and its Defenses 8 March-12 April. Siege of Spanish Fort and Fort Blakely 26 March-18 April. Assault and capture of Fort Blakely 9 April. Occupation of Mobile 12 April. March to Montgomery 13–25 April, and duty there and in District of Alabama until August. Mustered out 24 August 1865.

== Reenactments ==
The 32nd has a reenactment regiment in Iowa. They portray themselves as the Co B 32nd. Their home reenactment is in Mason City, IA though they operate all over Iowa, Wisconsin, and Minnesota. They can be contacted through Facebook.

== See also ==
- List of Iowa Civil War Units
- Iowa in the American Civil War
