= David Burbank =

American dentist and investor (1821–1895)

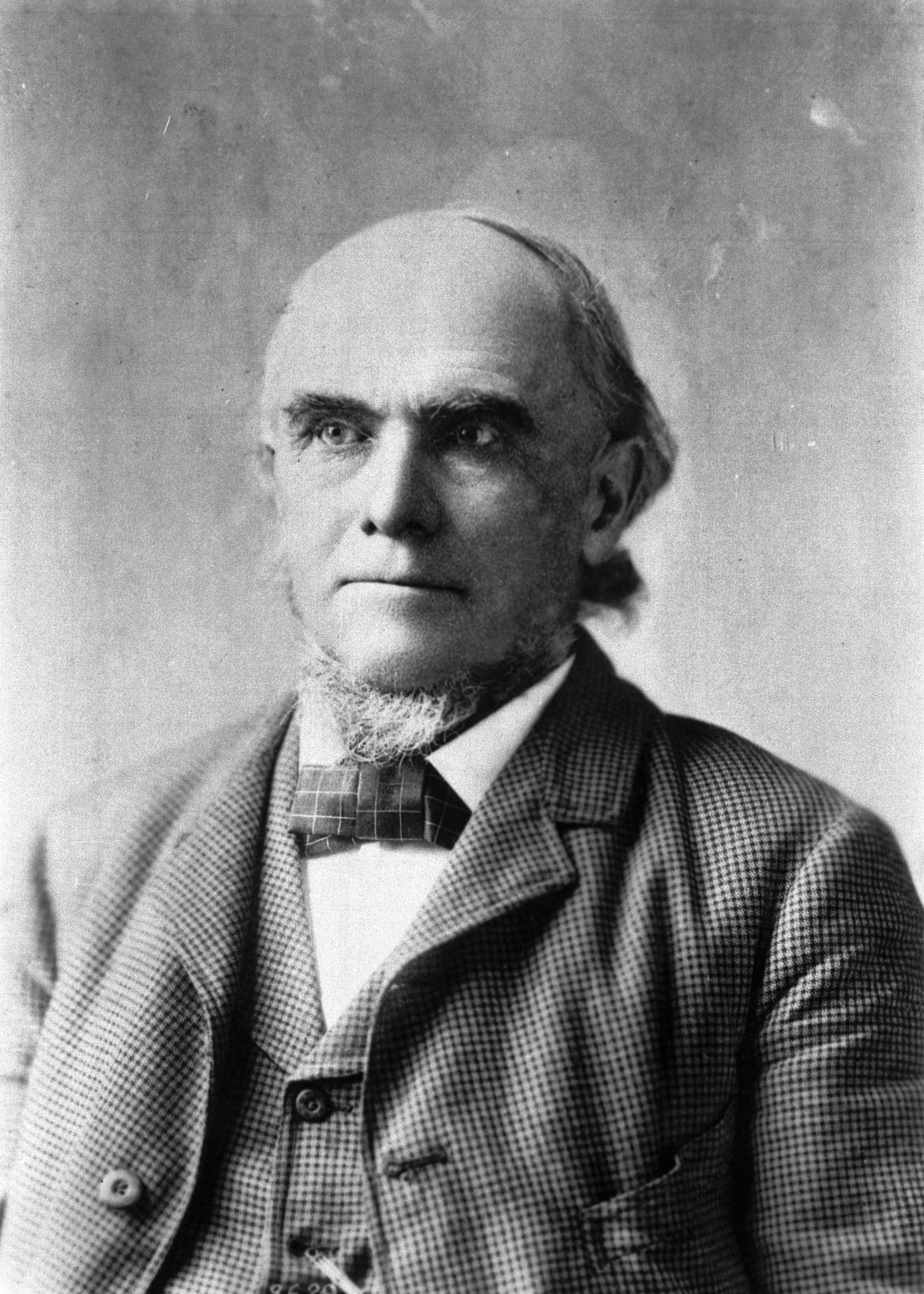
- Born: December 17, 1821; Effingham, New Hampshire, U.S.
- Died: January 21, 1895 (aged 73); Los Angeles, California, U.S.
- Known for: Founder of Burbank, California

David Burbank (December 17, 1821 – January 21, 1895) was an American dentist and real estate investor. He became a founder and the namesake of Burbank, California.

== Early life ==
Burbank was born on December 17, 1821, in Effingham, New Hampshire. He had one brother, Franklin Burbank. His family moved to Waterville, Maine, when he was a child. He studied dentistry, and entered the practice. Burbank moved to San Francisco, California, in 1853, and practiced dentistry there until 1866.

== Burbank, California ==
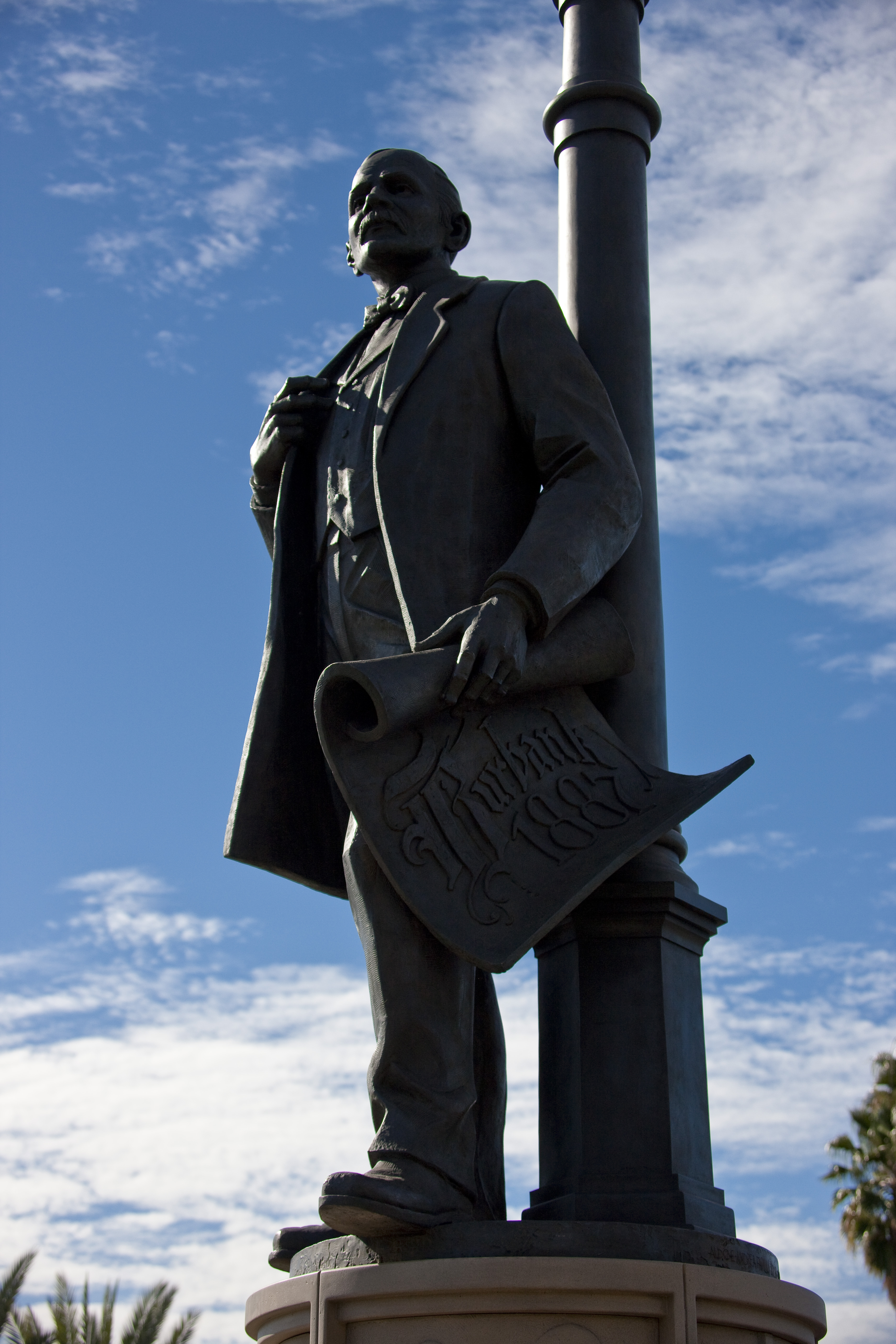
Statue of David Burbank

Burbank moved to Los Angeles in 1866. He bought 4,600 acres (1,900 ha) of Rancho Providencia on March 20, 1867, from David W. Alexander and Alexander Bell. Burbank also bought about 4,000 acres (1,600 ha) of Rancho San Rafael from Jonathan R. Scott that year. He united the two tracts and operated them as a sheep ranch.

In 1873, Burbank sold the right-of-way through the property to the Southern Pacific Railroad. He donated 1 acre (0.40 ha) of land to build a school in 1879, establishing the Providencia School District. In the early 1880s, he stopped raising sheep and rented out the land for farming.

In 1886, Burbank sold both tracts to Providencia Land, Water, and Development Co., of which he was a member, for $150,000 (equivalent to $5,400,000 in 2025). The corporation filed paperwork establishing the "Town of Burbank" on May 1, 1887.

Burbank built a hotel in the town in 1887. He also commissioned the construction of the Burbank Theatre on Main Street in 1888, which was completed in 1893.

== Later life and legacy ==
Burbank and his wife, Clara, had a daughter, named Flora. He continued to practice dentistry until 1872.

Burbank fell ill on January 5, 1895. He died at his home on January 21. He was interred at Angelus-Rosedale Cemetery.

The city of Burbank commissioned a 12-foot (3.7 m) bronze statue of Burbank from Andrea Favilli. It was dedicated at 1075 West Burbank Boulevard in 2010.

== See also ==
- History of the San Fernando Valley
