= Pine Hill Cemetery (Davenport, Iowa) =

Cemetery in Scott County, Iowa

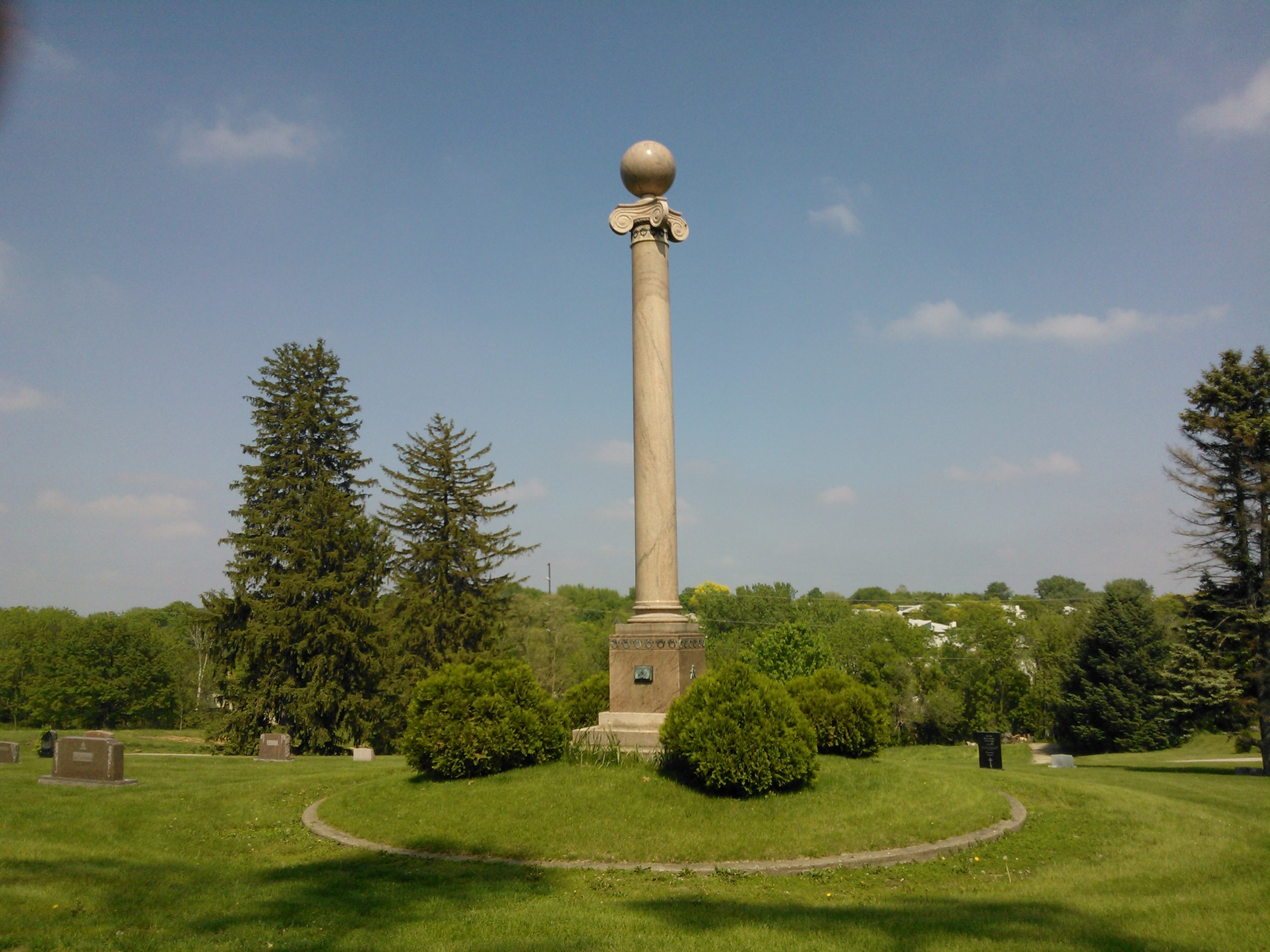
- Masonic Memorial
- Interactive map of Pine Hill Cemetery

Details
- Established: 1855
- Location: 1530 E. 39th St. Davenport, Iowa
- Country: United States
- Coordinates: 41.56220°N 90.55580°W
- Type: Independent
- Owned by: Pine Hill Cemetery Association
- Size: 72 acres (29 ha)
- Website: www.pinehillcemeterydavenport.com
- Find a Grave: Pine Hill Cemetery
- The Political Graveyard: Pine Hill Cemetery

Pine Hill Cemetery is located in north-central Davenport, Iowa, United States. It is in a section of the city that includes three other cemeteries: Mount Calvary, Davenport Memorial Park and Mount Nebo, which is in the back of Pine Hill. One of the cemetery's more prominent markers is a memorial to the Masons, which was erected in 1928 at a cost of $10,000.

A.C. Fulton bought 75 acres (30 ha) of prairieland that was two miles outside the city of Davenport at the time. He had 500 evergreens planted on the property and called the area Pine Hill. The property was laid out in lots for a cemetery and the first burial was in 1855. Seven area churches maintained a section in the cemetery for their membership. Mount Nebo Cemetery was created in 1861 for B’nai Ameth and Temple Emanuel. The sections maintained by the individual churches were unified in 1920 and the cemetery was governed by a board of directors and maintained a sales office at the Kahl Building. A house for the caretaker was built on the property in 1931 and the sales office was moved there at that time.

The cemetery was the site of the last native prairie plants in Scott County. They were moved to Scott County Park in 1972. The Pine Hill Cemetery Memorial Chapel was added to the property in 2003.

== Notable Burials ==
- Theodore Nevin Morrison (1850–1929), third bishop of the Episcopal Diocese of Iowa, 1899–1929
- Nicholas J. Rusch (1822–1864), Lieutenant Governor of Iowa, 1860–62
