= Nathaniel Gates Hedges =

American politician

Nathaniel Gates Hedges was an American politician.

Nathaniel Gates Hedges was a native of Massachusetts, born to parents Matthew and Abigail Oak Hedges on 23 April 1811, in the area of the state that was split off in 1820 to create Maine. He settled in Sioux City, Iowa, where he was involved in farming and real estate, before moving to Lee County, Iowa. While a resident of Lee County, Hedges was director of National Bank in Des Moines, and Lee County sheriff. Between 1860 and 1862, Hedges was a Democratic member of the Iowa House of Representatives from District 1. Hedges contested the 1865 Iowa Senate election, and was elected to serve District 1 of the Iowa Senate until 1870.
