= Emily Calkins Stebbins =

American lawyer

Emily Calkins Stebbins (January 22, 1843 - May 29, 1933) was an American notary public. Stebbins was the first woman to become a notary public in the United States.

== Early life and career ==
Stebbins was born on January 22, 1843, in Longmeadow, Massachusetts. She attended a village school there while also taking a course at an academy in Peacham, Vermont. She moved to New Hampton, Iowa, on July 13, 1861, and lived with her sister. When the deputy county recorder and treasurer of Chickasaw County, Iowa, joined the 38th Iowa Volunteer Infantry Regiment, Stebbins took his place from September 1, 1862, to January 1864. She was an abstractor at a law office in 1865. On February 2, 1866, Iowa governor William M. Stone commissioned her as a notary public, the first such position to be held by a woman in the United States. She was also an insurance agent and pension attorney. Stebbins recalled that "some people would not be waited upon by her because they believed that a woman could not do business correctly". She stopped working in 1929 due to poor health.

== Death ==
Stebbins died on May 29, 1933, at her home when she was 90 years old. By the time of her death, she was an abstractor for 64 years.
