= Beit Shalom Jewish Community =

Reform synagogue in Davenport, Iowa, US

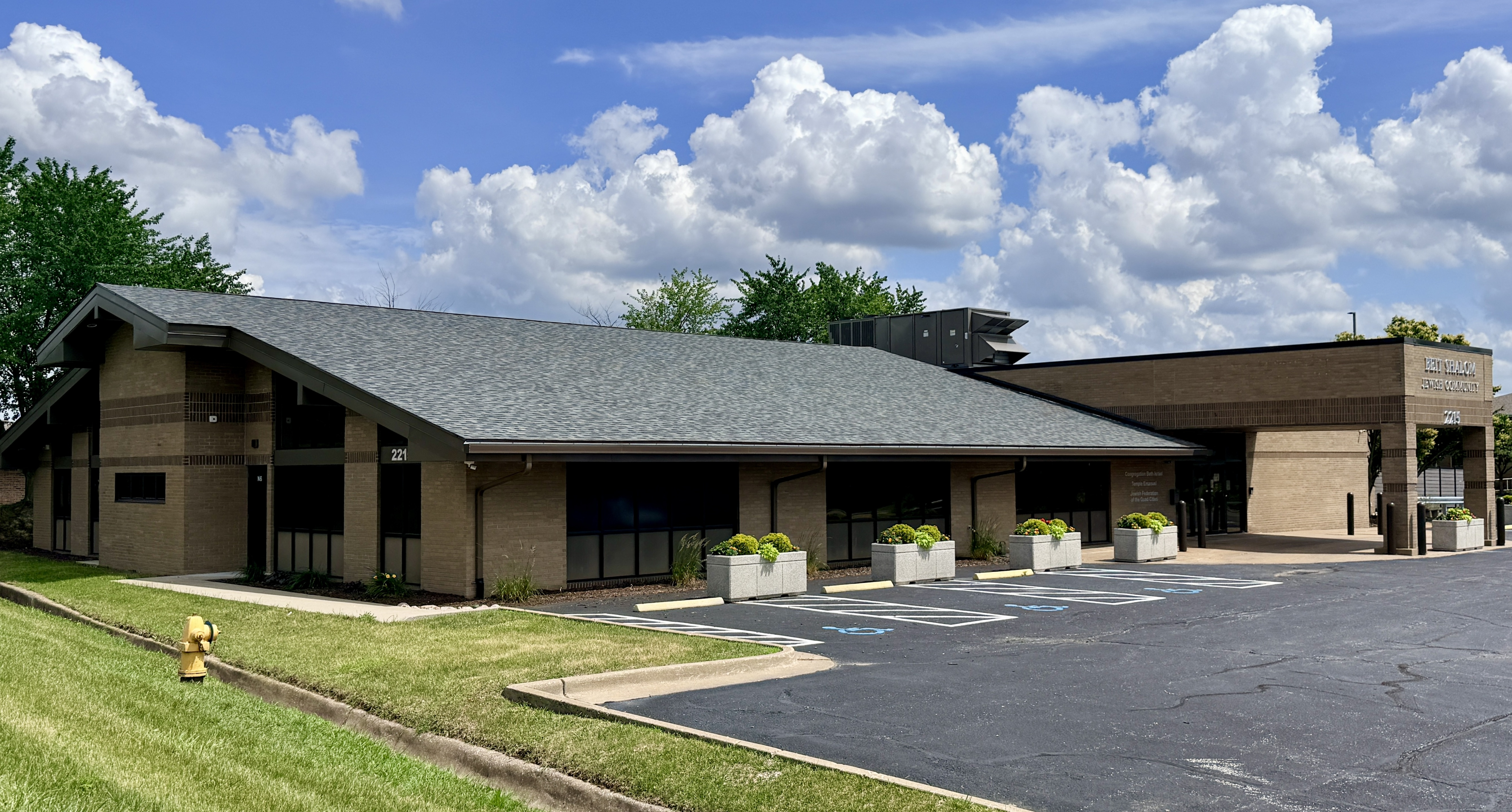
- Beit Shalom Jewish Community in 2026

- Location in Iowa

Religion
- Affiliation: Reform Judaism
- Ecclesiastical or organisational status: Synagogue
- Leadership: Rabbi Linda Bertenthal; Rabbi Henry Jay Karp (Emeritus)
- Status: Active

Location
- Location: 2215 East Kimberly Road, Davenport, Iowa
- Country: United States
- Coordinates: 41°33′12″N 90°31′36″W

Architecture
- Architect: Percival Goodman (1953)
- Type: Synagogue
- Style: Modernist (1953)
- Established: 2019 (as a joint facility): 1861 (Temple Emanuel); 1936 (Beth Israel)
- Completed: 2019 (E. Kimberly Rd.); Previous facilities: 1953 (Mississippi Ave); year unknown (Tri-City Center)
- Materials: Brick; concrete

Website
- qctemple.org

Beit Shalom Jewish Community is a Reform Jewish shared synagogue located at 2215 East Kimberly Road, on the east side of Davenport, Iowa, in the United States. The shared community facility was established in 2019 and is home to two congregations, Temple Emanuel, established in 1861, and Congregation Beth Israel, established in 1936. Temple Emanuel is the oldest Jewish congregation in Iowa and both congregations are affiliated with the Union for Reform Judaism.

== History ==
=== Temple Emanuel ===
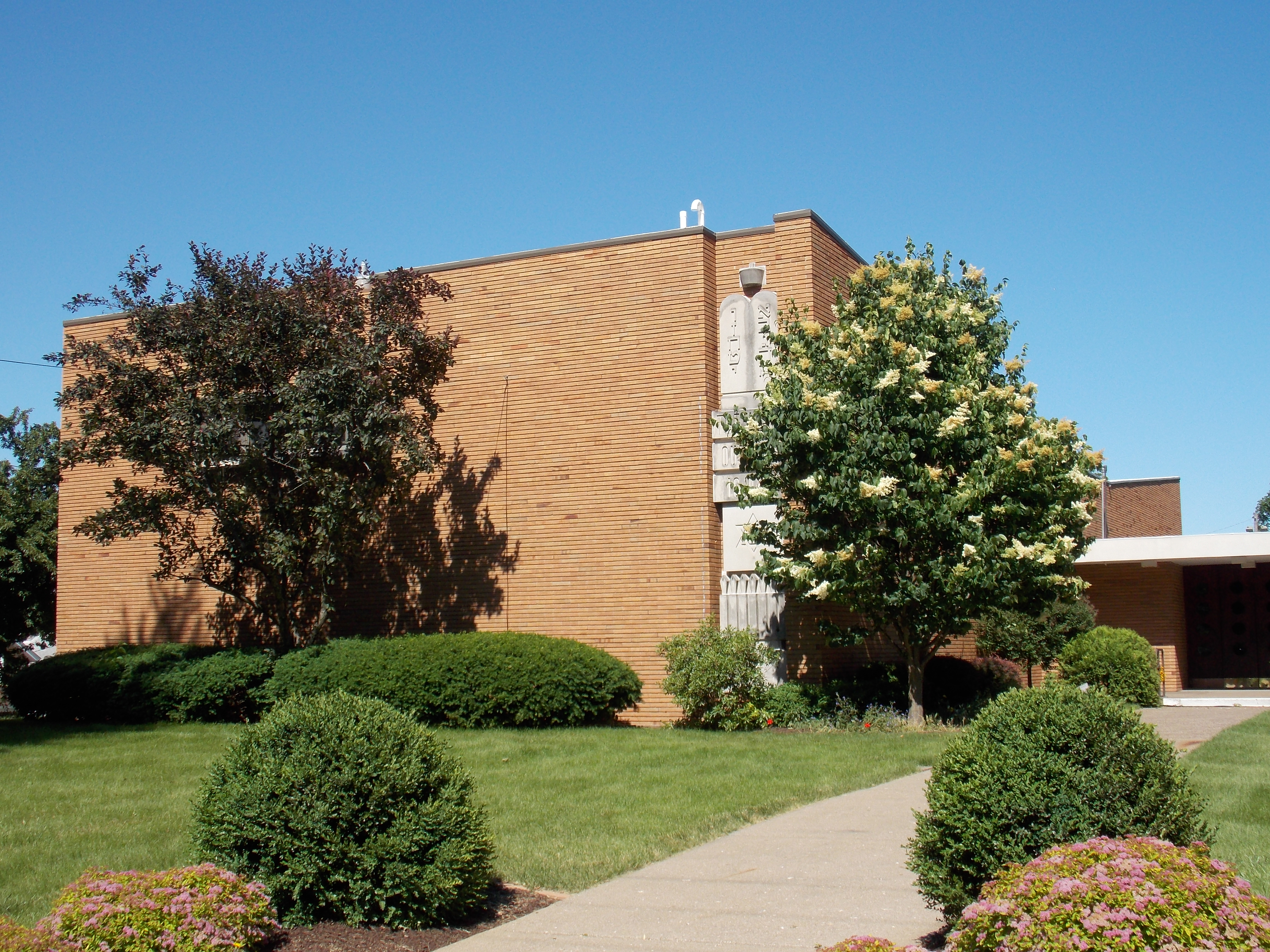
The former Temple Emanuel on Mississippi Avenue

Among the first 500 residents of Davenport in the late 1830s and early 1840s were 12 people who were Jewish. There was no attempt to organize a congregation until more substantial numbers immigrated from Germany in the 1850s. Mount Nebo Cemetery, adjacent to Pine Hill Cemetery, was organized at that time. By 1860 there were eleven Jewish families in town. On October 21, 1861 they organized the B'nai Israel congregation, the first Jewish congregation to organize in the state of Iowa. In 1862, they rented the third floor of the building where the Forrest Block now stands for use as a synagogue. The constitutions and by-laws were accepted and approved on December 6, 1862. The congregation floundered somewhat in its early years until it was more fully organized in 1874.

Rabbi Isaac Fall, who was Orthodox, led the community for 15 years in the late 19th century. It was during this time that the congregation began to embrace the Reform movement. Women were accepted on an equal basis with men and men did not have to cover their heads during worship. Dissention was also caused when services were held in English rather than German. The congregation officially affiliated with the Union of American Hebrew Congregations (UAHC) in 1879, just six years after it formed. The first synagogue was built under Rabbi Fall's leadership in 1885 on Ripley Street, across the street from the Scott County Courthouse. It was named Temple Emanuel. The Orthodox formed their own congregation, B'nai Ameth, in 1894. They did not, however, have a regular rabbi until 1907, nor a synagogue of their own until 1909. With the death of its lay leader, Harry Lipsman, the Orthodox congregation closed in 1963. By 1900, there were about 50 Jewish families in Davenport.

A second Temple Emanuel was built at Brady and Eleventh Streets in 1906. Newspaper publisher E. P. Adler helped the congregation through the Great Depression years. In 1944, the city block at Twelfth Street and Mississippi Avenue was purchased by the congregation. The third synagogue was built from 1952-1953 for $375,000 ($4.51 million in present-day terms). New York City architect Percival Goodman, a leading theorist of modern synagogue design, designed the building in the Modernist style. When they celebrated their 150th anniversary in 2011, Temple Emanuel counted 150 families in its congregation.

=== Congregation Beth Israel ===
Beth Israel was founded as a Conservative congregation in Rock Island, Illinois in 1936 and incorporated two Orthodox congregations into theirs in 1950 and 1968.

== 2019 shared facilities ==
For more than 20 years, members from Temple Emanuel and Beth Israel discussed uniting as their numbers decreased. Over the years the two congregations shared schooling and holiday celebrations. In 2019, Beth Israel decided to sell their synagogue, the Tri-City Jewish Center, and approached Temple Emanuel with a proposal that the two congregations share space. That same year, property was acquired on East Kimberly Road in Davenport. It was built in 1992 to house a restaurant and then was used by a local realtor for offices.

Following acquisition, the building was renovated for religious purposes and named Beit Shalom Jewish Community. Elements from the old synagogues were incorporated into the new space, including two Trees of Life from both congregations, three ner tamids, oversized doors and Ten Commandments from the Tri-City Jewish Center, and stained glass windows and the Torah ark from Temple Emanuel. In early 2021, the two congregations "reached a sharing agreement in which they each will maintain their own identity, board of trustees and prayer books and services, but will share space and a rabbi." Members from both Temple Emanuel and Beth Israel walked from their former synagogues with their respective Torah scrolls to Beit Shalom on September 2, 2021. Together, the two congregations number 180 families.

The former Tri-City Jewish Center was sold to Two Rivers YMCA of Moline, Illinois. The 30,000-square-foot (2,800 m^{2}) facility will be renovated into a combination Rock Island YMCA and a branch of the Rock Island Public Library. The former Temple Emanuel building was acquired by the YWCA of the Quad Cities in 2023 for their new Iowa Empowerment Center.
