= Senator Kernan =

Senator Kernan may refer to:

- Francis Kernan (1816–1892), U.S. Senator from New York from 1875 to 1881
- Gay Kernan (born 1947), New Mexico State Senate
- Michael J. Kernan (1884–1953), New York State Senate
