= Andrea Favilli (sculptor) =

Andrea Goffredo Favilli
- Born: March 8, 1963 (age 63); Rome, Italy
- Occupations: Sculptor, designer
- Spouse: Camille Favilli (1994–present)

Andrea Favilli is an Italian-born fine arts sculptor, creative venturist, and co-founder of Favilli Studio – a premier, entertainment design company based in South Pasadena, California.

== Biography ==
Andrea Favilli was born in Rome, Italy March 8, 1963. His early art education was with his father Riccardo Aldo Favilli, who worked as an art director at the famed Cinecittà Studios. When Andrea was 7 years old, his family moved from Italy to Redondo Beach, California. He graduated from Bishop Montgomery High School in 1981 and from the Art Center College of Design in 1986.

Favilli created the Disney Legends Award, The American Teacher Award, and the Frank G. Wells Award; The Cameraman in front of the Warner Brothers Studio in Burbank, California, The Transpacific Yacht Race New Course Record Trophy; the Tree of Life, Stough Canyon, Burbank, CA; Monumental Disney Legends Trophies at Disneyland, Paris and Walt Disney Studios, Burbank, CA; the Roy O. & Edna Disney at St. Joseph's Hospital in Burbank, CA; and Dr. David Burbank at Five Points in Burbank, CA.

=== Works ===
- 1989: Disney Legends Award, commissioned by the Walt Disney Company.
- 1990: American Teacher Award, commissioned by the Walt Disney Company for the Disney Channel.
- 1992: The Cameraman, commissioned by Roy E. Disney. A 10-foot bronze sculpture of the mythical Motion Picture Cameraman and Henry King (director). Installed at the center of the Media District in front of Warner Brothers Studio in LA, California.
- 1993: The Cameraman, second edition, commissioned by the Walt Disney Company. Installed in 1994 in the hub (central area) of the Disney/MGM Studios at Walt Disney World, in Orlando Florida.
- 1994: Frank G. Wells Award, commissioned by Michael Eisner in memory of company president Frank Wells.
- 1997: Disney Legends Sculpture, commissioned by the Walt Disney Company, a 14-foot monumental bronze sculpture of the Disney Legends Award at the main entry of Disneyland Paris, France.
- 1989: The Transpacific Yacht Race New Course Record Trophy, commissioned by Roy E. Disney for the Transpacific Yacht Race.
- 1999: Disney Legends Sculpture, second edition, installed and inaugurated at the historic Walt Disney Studios (Burbank), a second edition 14-foot monumental bronze sculpture of the Disney Legends Award for the company’s 75th Anniversary celebration.
- 2003: The Tree of Life, commissioned by the city of Burbank, California. A 7-foot bronze and water sculpture for the Stough Canyon Nature Center.
- 2004: Roy O. and Edna Disney, commissioned by the St. Joseph Providence Hospital in Burbank, California.
- 2007–2008: Dr. David Burbank — The Five Points Project, commissioned by the city of Burbank, California via the Burbank Art in Places Program

== Gallery ==
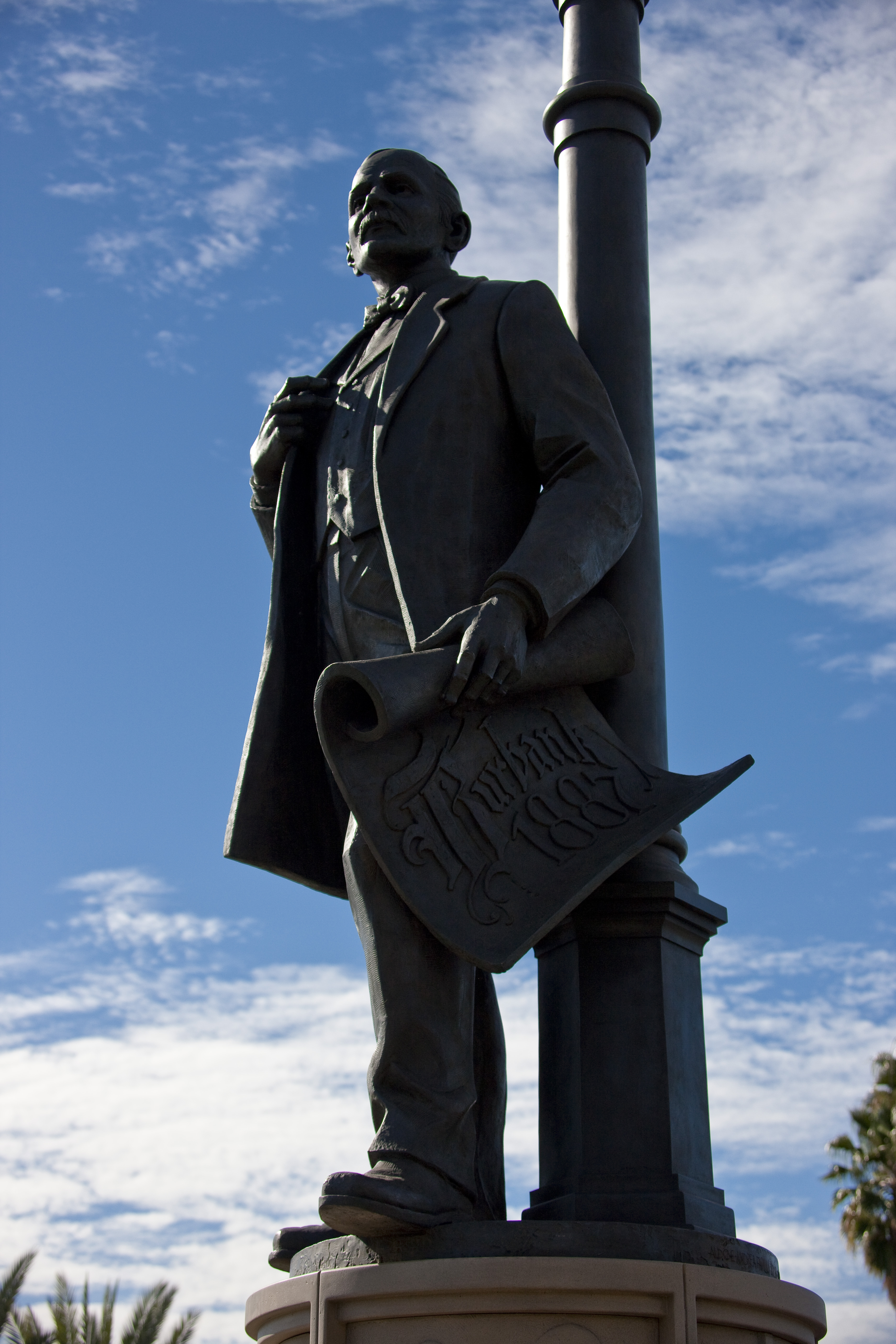
5 Points Art Monument, by Aldo & Andrea Favilli

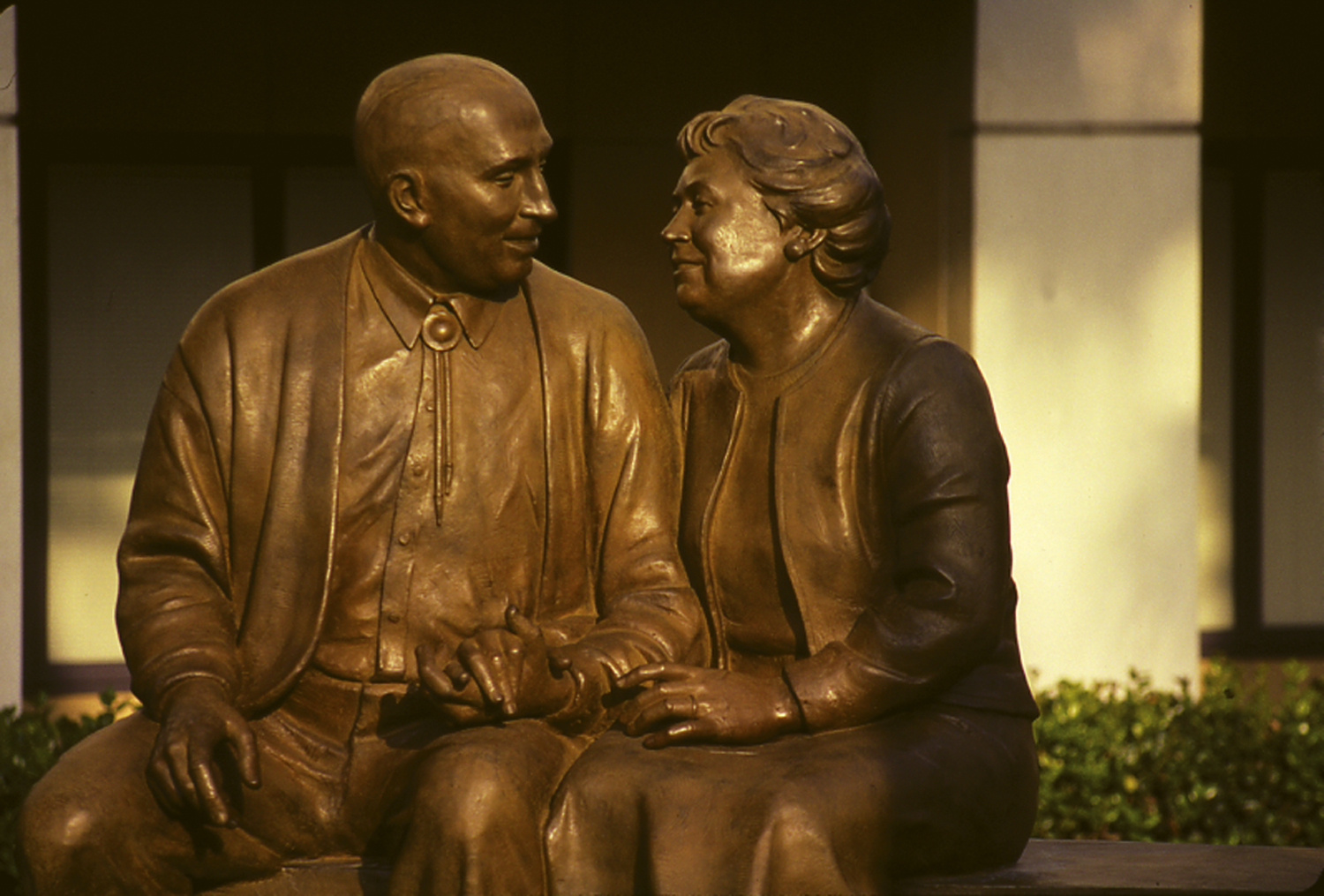
Roy O. & Edna Disney, by Aldo & Andrea Favilli

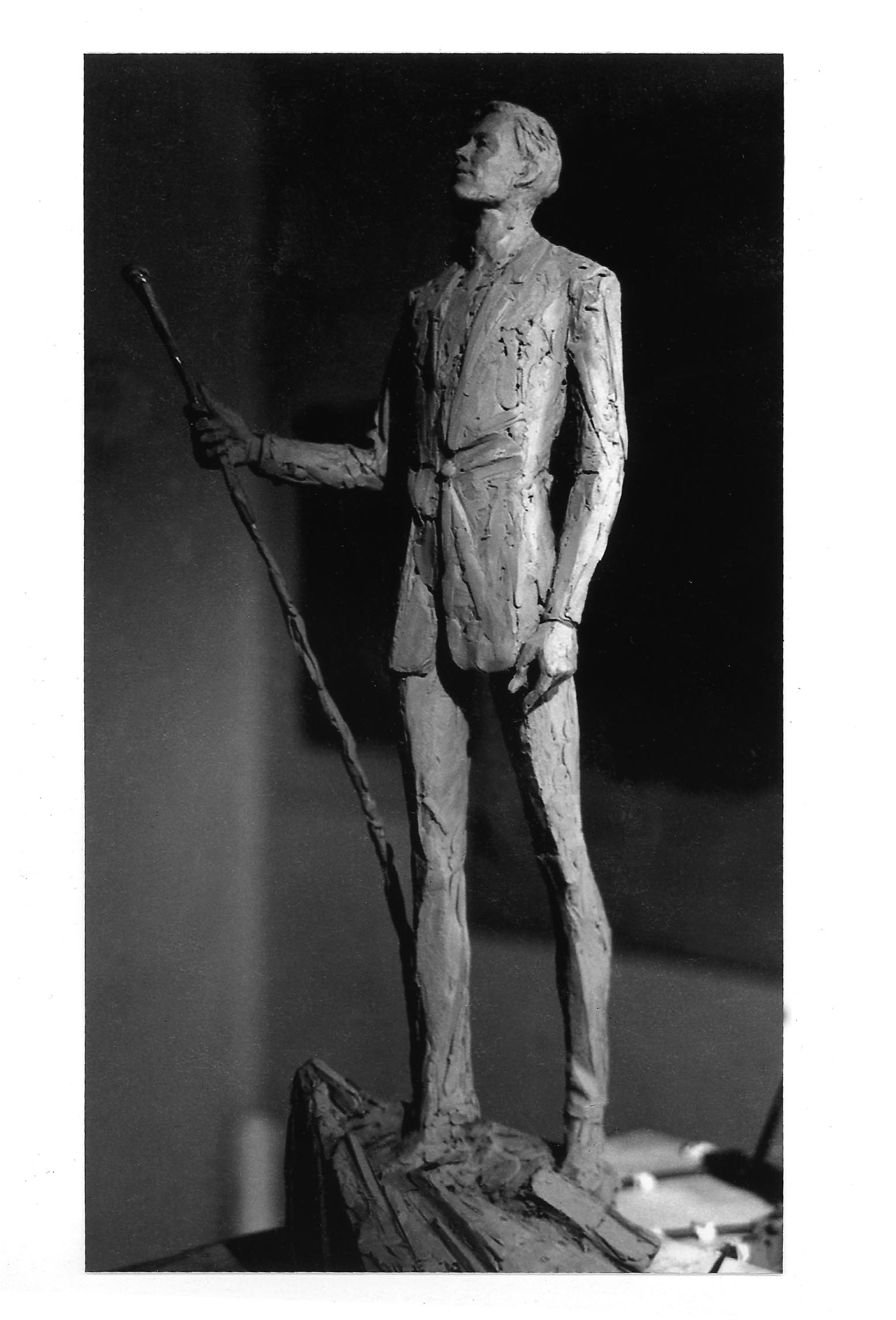
The Frank G. Wells Award, by Aldo & Andrea Favilli

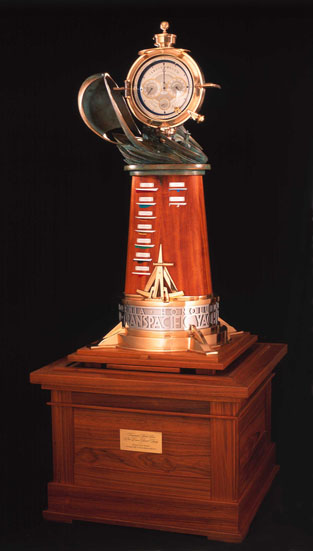
The Transpac Honolulu Race Elapsed Time Trophy, by Aldo & Andrea Favilli

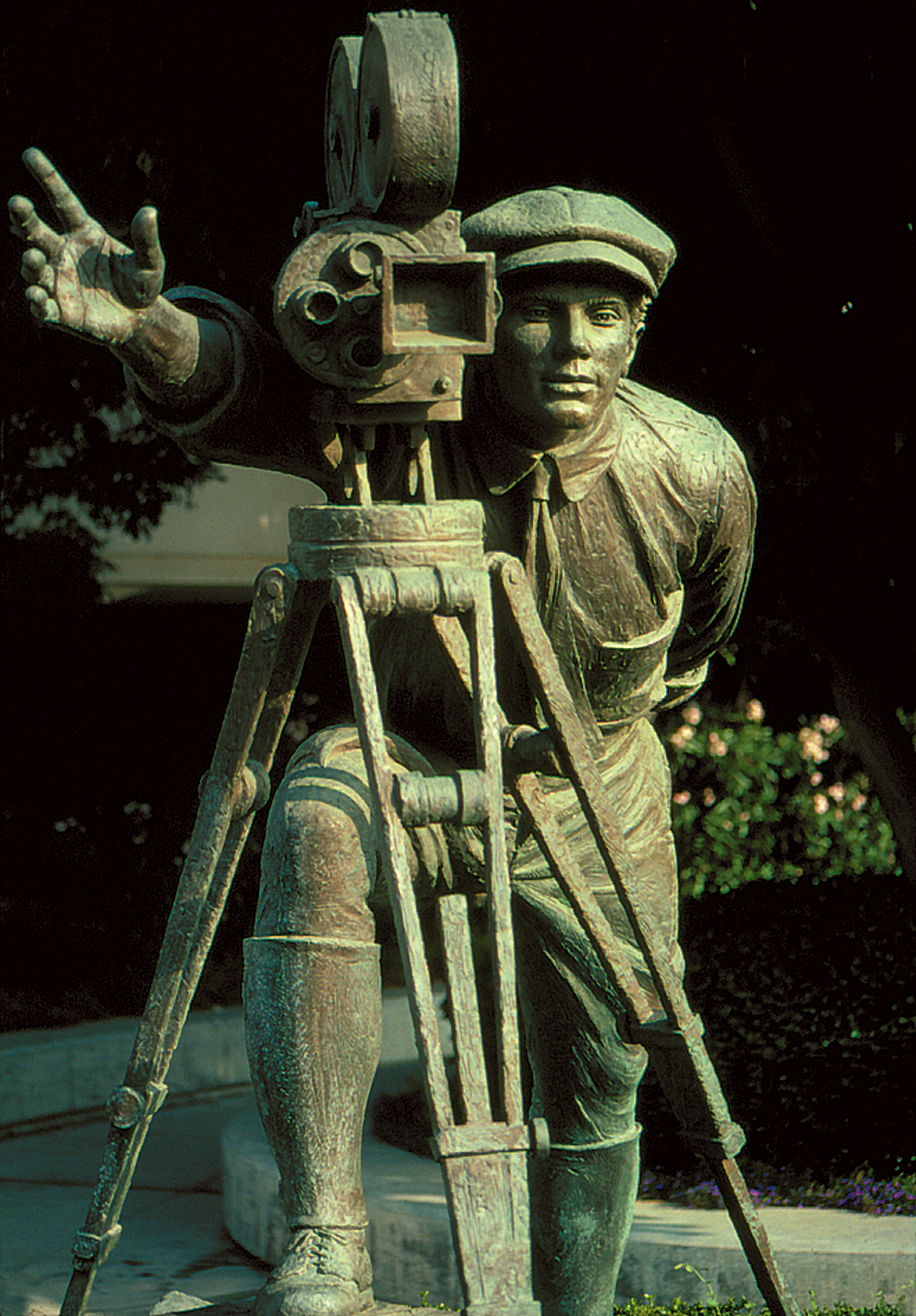
The Cameraman, by Aldo & Andrea Favilli
