= De Hooge Heerlijkheid =

Coordinates: 51°45′31.15″N 4°9′55.44″E

- Interactive map of De Hooge Heerlijkheid

Restaurant information
- Established: 1969
- Head chef: J Kern
- Food type: French, Fusion, Fish
- Location: Voorstraat 19- 23, Middelharnis, 3241 EE, Netherlands
- Seating capacity: 80
- Website: Official website

De Hooge Heerlijkheid is a restaurant in Middelharnis, Netherlands. It was a fine dining restaurant that was awarded one Michelin star in the periods 1975-1992 and 1995-1996.

Owner and then head chef John Kern was one of the founders of Les Patrons Cuisiniers.

John and Wieke Kern founded the restaurant in 1969. They developed the restaurant from a pancake-restaurant to a Michelin starred restaurant. Later his son Mark Kern took over the restaurant. In 2011, Mark Kern handed over the kitchen of De Hooge Heerlijkheid to Maurice Montero Lowes and started a fish shop and wholesale under the name "Poisson & Cuisine". The restaurant is now only open to groups.

== See also ==
- List of Michelin starred restaurants in the Netherlands
