= Charles B. Kern =

American politician (1867–1942)

Charles B. Kern (1 February 1867 – 18 July 1942) was an American politician.

Charles B. Kern was born in Norwalk, Iowa, on 1 February 1867 to parents John and Miriam Black Kern. Kern lived on the family farm, attended school in Indianola, and graduated from Simpson College. He married Mary Frances Spring in August 1893, with whom he raised four children. Kern was a member of the Republican Party who represented District 27 in the Iowa House of Representatives between 1917 and 1921, and was subsequently elected to the Iowa Senate from 1925 to 1929 for District 11. He died on 18 July 1942 of a heart attack in Norwalk.
