= Charles Paulk =

American politician (1809–1885)

Charles Paulk (19 July 1809 – 15 June 1885) was an American politician.

Paulk was born on 19 July 1809 in Vermont, and raised in St. Lawrence County, New York. He was a student at Middlebury College from 1830 to 1834, then taught school at Geneva and in Monroe County. Between 1847 and 1850, Paulk was a lawyer. He ended his legal practice to travel westward during the California gold rush, and remained in California until 1852. Paulk settled in Allamakee County, Iowa, upon leaving California. He was first elected to the Iowa House of Representatives in 1859, as a Democrat from District 56. Between 1864 and 1866, Paulk served his second term as a state representative, this time for District 50. He was subsequently elected to the Iowa Senate from District 41 and remained in office until 1868. He died on 15 June 1885.
