= William M. Stone =

American politician and 6th Governor of Iowa

William Milo Stone
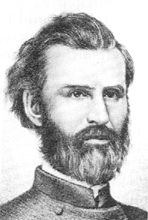

6th Governor of Iowa
- In office January 14, 1864 – January 16, 1868
- Lieutenant: Enoch W. Eastman
- Preceded by: Samuel J. Kirkwood
- Succeeded by: Samuel Merrill

Member of the Iowa House of Representatives
- In office 1877–1878

Judge of Iowa's 11th Judicial District
- In office April 1857 – May 1861

Personal details
- Born: October 14, 1827 Jefferson County, New York, U.S.
- Died: July 18, 1893 (aged 65) Oklahoma City, Oklahoma Territory, U.S.
- Resting place: Graceland Cemetery, Knoxville, Iowa
- Party: Republican
- Spouse: Caroline Mathews (m.1857)
- Children: 1

Military service
- Allegiance: Union Army
- Years of service: May 1861-August 1863
- Rank: Colonel
- Unit: 3rd Iowa Volunteer Infantry Regiment, Company B; 22nd Iowa Volunteer Infantry Regiment
- Battles/wars: American Civil War; Battle of Blue Hill; Battle of Liberty; Battle of Shiloh; Vicksburg Campaign; Siege of Vicksburg

William Milo Stone (October 14, 1827 – July 18, 1893) was the sixth governor of Iowa (1864–68).

== Early life and education ==
Stone was born in Jefferson County, New York, and moved with his family to Coshocton, Ohio in 1834. He read law there and was admitted to the bar in 1851.

== Career ==
In 1854, he moved to Knoxville, Iowa, where he opened a law practice and bought the local newspaper. In 1856, he was a delegate to the convention that formed the Republican Party, and he was an elector for 1856 Republican presidential nominee John C. Frémont. He was an enthusiastic supporter of Abraham Lincoln at the 1860 Republican convention, and was so again in 1864. From 1857 to 1861, he served as a state district court judge. He married Caroline Mathews in 1857; they had one child, William A. Stone.

After the attack on Fort Sumter in 1861, Stone enlisted as a private in the Union Army. He was quickly promoted to captain, and then major, of Company B, 3rd Iowa Volunteer Infantry Regiment. He fought and was wounded at the Battle of Liberty, but returned to fight at the Battle of Shiloh, where he was taken prisoner. Stone was paroled by Jefferson Davis and sent to Washington, D.C. to negotiate an exchange of prisoners; after initially failing to reach an agreement, he returned to Confederate captivity, was again paroled, and was released after an exchange agreement was reached. In 1862, Stone was promoted to colonel of the 22nd Iowa Volunteer Infantry Regiment. He led that unit in the Vicksburg Campaign, and was again wounded on May 22, 1863, during a major Union assault undertaken as part of the Siege of Vicksburg.

Stone was named the Republican nominee for governor in June 1863, and resigned from the Union Army in August. He was elected by a large margin in the general election, defeating Union general James M. Tuttle. He was reelected in 1865. During his tenure, he dealt with several difficult issues, including making sure Iowa met its 1864 draft quotas, and supporting voting rights for black Iowa citizens. It is reputed by some sources that Stone was present in April 1865 when Lincoln was assassinated at Ford's Theatre, and that Stone helped carry the wounded Lincoln across the street. However, no known primary or contemporaneous accounts describe that happening, and in fact, it is otherwise known that four members of a Pennsylvania artillery regiment actually handled the President. On February 22, 1866, Stone appointed Emily Calkins Stebbins as a notary public which made Stebbins the first such woman to hold that position in the United States.

After leaving the governor's office in 1868, Stone served one term in the Iowa House of Representatives (1877–78), and was appointed Assistant Commissioner and Commissioner of the United States General Land Office.

== Death ==
He died of pneumonia in 1893 in Oklahoma, where he had moved to practice law and live with his son. He is buried at Graceland Cemetery in Knoxville, Iowa.

Party political offices
Preceded by Samuel J. Kirkwood	Republican nominee Governor of Iowa; 1863, 1865	Succeeded by Samuel Merrill
Political offices
Preceded by Samuel J. Kirkwood	Governor of Iowa; 1864–1868	Succeeded by Samuel Merrill
Preceded by Thomas Henry Carter	Commissioner of the General Land Office; November 18, 1892 – March 28, 1893	Succeeded by Silas W. Lamoreaux
