= Joseph A. Green (politician) =

American politician (1814–1876)

Joseph A. Green (February 24, 1814 – November 10, 1876) was an American politician.

Green was a native of Rutland County, Vermont born on February 24, 1814. He drove cattle to Detroit, Michigan in 1831, aged 17, then found work at a Castleton, Vermont, general store. Soon, Green traveled westward again and was hired by a store owner in Milwaukee, Wisconsin. After leaving Milwaukee, Green worked for a shoe store in St. Louis, Missouri, then settled in Muscatine, Iowa, by 1844. Green explored a business partnership with a man surnamed Enders, then pivoted to working alongside George C. Stone, on the Green and Stone general store.

Green defeated A. M. Hare in a special election to the Iowa Senate, necessitated by the relocation of Andrew Oliphant Patterson, and served District 14 as a Republican from May 20, 1861, to January 12, 1862. During this period, a special session of the Iowa General Assembly considered actions to take in regards to the American Civil War.

Joseph Green was married to Buckfield, Maine, native Cyrena Bisbee, whose parents were Martin and Lucy (Cushman) Bisbee, and whose grandfather, John Bisbee, served in the American Revolutionary War. Green died in Muscatine on November 10, 1876.
