= Frederick F. Faville =

American judge (1865–1954)

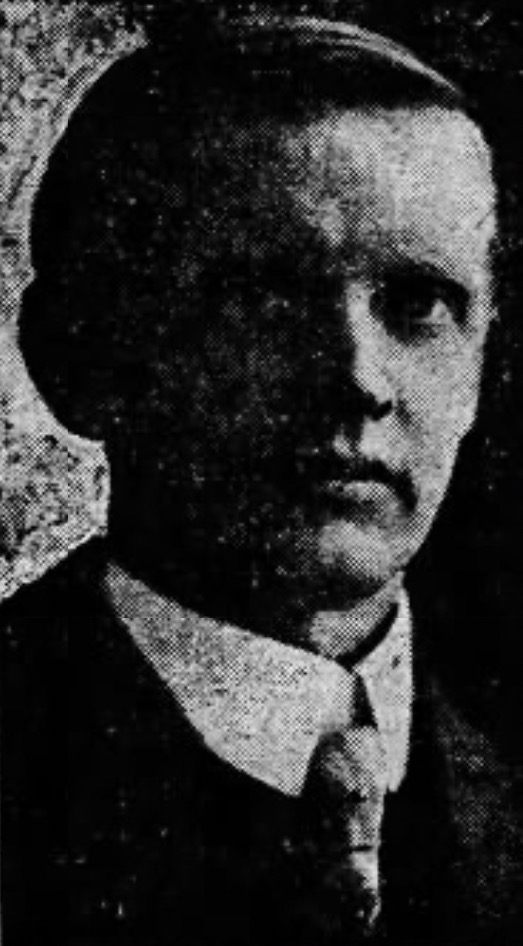
- Faville in 1925

Chief Justice of the Iowa Supreme Court
- In office 1925 – December 31, 1932

Associate Justice of the Iowa Supreme Court
- In office January 1, 1921 – December 31, 1932

United States District Attorney for the Northern District of Iowa
- In office March 15, 1907 – 1913
- President: Theodore Roosevelt; William Howard Taft

County Attorney of Buena Vista County
- In office 1895–1899

Personal details
- Born: June 5, 1865 Mitchell County, Iowa, US
- Died: February 19, 1954 (aged 88) Des Moines, Iowa, US
- Spouse(s): Cora Thornburg (m. 1891; died 1919) Josephine Creelman (m. 1925)
- Children: 3
- Relatives: Oran Faville (uncle)
- Education: Iowa State University (BS); University of Maryland (no degree); University of Iowa (LLB); Buena Vista College (LLD)

Frederick F. Faville (June 5, 1865 – February 19, 1954) was an American judge and lawyer. He was chief justice of the Iowa Supreme Court.

== Early life and education ==
Faville was born on a farm in Michell County, Iowa, on June 5, 1865. He was the third of the five children of Judge Amos S. Faville (1823–1900) and Esther D. Crary, who were originally from New York. Faville's paternal uncle was politician Oran Faville.

Faville attended Cedar Valley Seminary in Osage, Iowa. He then attended Iowa State University, graduating with a Bachelor's in political science in 1888. He attended the University of Maryland Law School in 1889 and 1890 but received no degree. In 1891, he went to the University of Iowa College of Law and received a law degree. He received a Doctorate of Laws from Buena Vista College in 1933.

== Career ==
Amos served in the Iowa House in the 13th General Assembly from Howard and Mitchell from 1870 to 1872. In 1895, Faville became County Attorney in Buena Vista County, Iowa. He served there until 1899. He was a presidential elector in the 1904.

On March 15, 1907, Faville was appointed by President Theodore Roosevelt to be United States District Attorney for the Northern District of Iowa, where he served until 1913. He was elected to the Iowa Supreme Court in 1920, serving from January 1, 1921 to December 21, 1932. He was chief justice of the Iowa Supreme Court from 1925 to December 21, 1932.

The United States Supreme Court nominated Faville to be Special Master to determine the official border of Wisconsin and Michigan. On March 1, 1942, he was appointed Editor of the Code. He was also appointed Reporter of the Iowa Supreme Court. He served in both positions until 1946.

== Personal life ==
Faville married Cora Thornburg in December 1891. She was born in 1866 in Orchard, Iowa and died in March 14, 1919. They had two children. He later married Josephine Creelman in 1925 in Cedar Rapids, Iowa.

Faville died on February 19, 1954, in Des Moines, from a stroke. He was interred in Oak Grove Cemetery in Mitchell, Iowa.

Political offices
Preceded by	Justice of the Iowa Supreme Court; 1921–1932	Succeeded by
