= John W. Thompson (Iowa politician) =

American politician (1823–1883)

John W. Thompson (October 14, 1823 – August 11, 1883) was an American politician.

Thompson was born on October 14, 1823, in Huntingdon County, Pennsylvania. He began his two-year teaching career at the age of nineteen, and thereafter studied law with Thomas P. Campbell in the borough of Huntingdon for an additional two-year period. Thereafter, from 1847, Thompson began his own legal practice in Williamsburg and Hollidaysburg.

In the 1844 United States presidential election, Thompson cast his vote for Whig Party candidate Henry Clay. Thompson began traveling westward in 1854, settled in Davenport, Iowa, by 1855, and formed a law firm with partner H. G. Barber (or Horatio B. Barner). Between 1861 and 1866, Thompson maintained his own legal practice, then joined forces with J. D. Campbell until 1870. Thompson continued to be politically active in Iowa, and joined the emerging Republican Party. He served twice as a delegate of the Republican National Convention, in 1860 and 1880. Thompson was a member of the Iowa General Assembly from January 11, 1858, to January 12, 1862, first as a legislator for District 28 of the Iowa House of Representatives until 1860, and thereafter for District 19 of the Iowa Senate. In 1878, Thompson was elected mayor of Davenport. He served a one-year term, and was subsequently named city attorney under mayor John E. Henry in 1881. Thompson returned to the mayoralty in April 1883, and died in office on August 11, 1883.

John W. Thompson married Westmoreland County, Pennsylvania, native Margaret A. Wallace on May 12, 1874. She died on March 12, 1875.
