= Enoch W. Eastman =

American politician (1810–1885)

Enoch Eastman
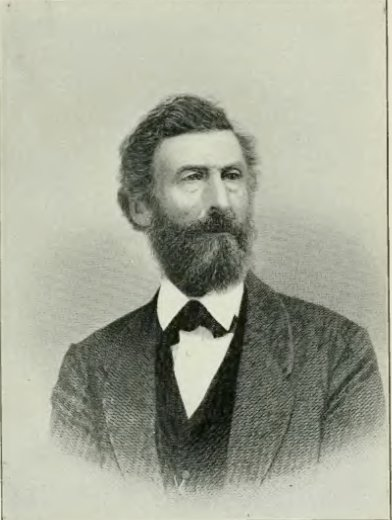

Member of the Iowa Senate
- In office January 14, 1884 – January 9, 1885

4th Lieutenant Governor of Iowa
- In office 1864–1866
- Governor: William M. Stone
- Preceded by: John R. Needham
- Succeeded by: Benjamin F. Gue

Personal details
- Born: April 30, 1810 Deerfield, New Hampshire
- Died: January 9, 1885 (aged 74)
- Spouse(s): Sarah Carolina Greenough (m. 1845; died 1861) Amanda Hall (m. 1865)
- Children: 5

Enoch Worthen Eastman (April 30, 1810 – January 9, 1885) was the 4th Lieutenant Governor of Iowa from 1864 to 1866.

== Early life ==
Enoch Eastman's grandfather Ephraim Eastman was present at the Battle of Bunker Hill in the American Revolutionary War, and his father John served as a Lieutenant in the War of 1812.

Eastman was born in Deerfield, New Hampshire in 1810, the third of seven children of John Eastman and Mary Worthen James. He worked on his father's farm until he was 21. Eastman studied law in New Hampshire. He was admitted to the bar in June 1840 at Concord. He practiced in New Hampshire from 1840 to 1844.

He then moved to Burlington, Iowa in the summer of 1844. Eastman moved to Oskaloosa in 1847 and to Eldora in 1857.

== Political career ==
Although a Democrat, he distinguished himself the first year of his residence in Iowa by taking the stump against the adoption of the Constitution recently framed by his party and helped to defeat it at the election. Under this Constitution the boundaries of the State would have extended north taking in a large portion of southeastern Minnesota and would have excluded all of the Missouri slope west of a line running north and south from near the west side of Kossuth and Ringgold counties. Enoch W. Eastman, Theodore S. Parvin and Frederick D. Mills, all Democrats and young men, warmly opposed the adoption of such boundaries and influenced enough of their Democratic associates to unite with the Whigs to defeat the Constitution. This was one of the most important public services ever rendered the State.

Eastman created the inscription for the Washington Monument in 1850 of “Iowa—Her affections like the rivers of her borders, flow to an inseparable Union.”, when Iowa was asked to help build it. When the Civil War began, he left the Democratic party and united with the Republicans.

Eastman was elected Lieutenant Governor of Iowa serving under Governor William M. Stone.

In 1883, Eastman was elected to the Iowa Senate and died in office after less than a year.

== Personal life ==
On January 8, 1845, he married Sarah Caroline Greenough. Together they had 3 daughters and a son. She died of a fever in 1861. Eastman remarried in 1865 to Amanda Hall. Together they had a son.

He was a member of the Unitarian Church.

Political offices
Preceded by John R. Needham	Lieutenant Governor of Iowa; 1864–1866	Succeeded by Benjamin F. Gue
