= Oliver Sherraden =

American politician (1814–1881)

Oliver P. Sherraden (November 14, 1814 – November 13, 1881) was an American politician.

Born in Ohio on November 14, 1814, Sherraden worked on his father's farm before moving to Canton, Illinois. While a Canton resident, Sherraden met and married Lydia M. Johnson, who was originally from Vermont. Sherraden and Johnson later relocated to Princeton, where Sherraden started his own store. They later settled in Richland, Iowa, and Sherraden and won election to the Iowa Senate, serving as a Republican legislator for District 15 from 1858 to 1860, and District 16 from 1860 to 1862.

In 1860, Sherraden moved to Council Bluffs. He died at his home in Council Bluffs on November 13, 1881.
