= Benjamin F. Gue =

American politician (1828–1904)

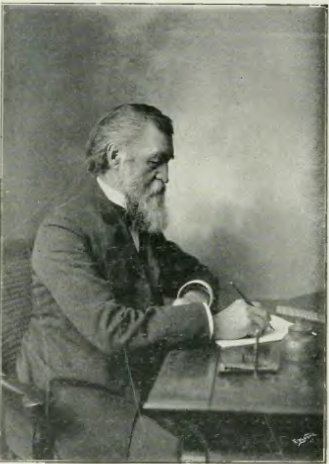
- Portrait in History of Iowa From the Earliest Times to the Beginning of the Twentieth Century

5th Lieutenant Governor of Iowa
- In office 1866–1868
- Governor: William M. Stone
- Preceded by: Enoch W. Eastman
- Succeeded by: John Scott

Member of the Iowa Senate
- In office 1862–1866

Member of the Iowa House of Representatives
- In office 1858–1862

Personal details
- Born: Greene County, New York, US
- Party: Republican

Benjamin F. Gue (December 25, 1828 – June 1, 1904) was an American newspaper editor, writer and politician in Iowa. He served as a member of Iowa House of Representatives (1858–1862); member of Iowa Senate (1862–1866), and as the Lieutenant Governor of Iowa (1866–1868). He wrote the four-volume History of Iowa From the Earliest Times to the Beginning of the Twentieth Century.

== Early life ==
Gue was born on December 25, 1828, on a farm near Coxsackie, New York, to abolitionist Quakers John and Catherine Gurney Gue. He had five younger brothers. Gue had to help his mother raise his siblings after their father died when he was 10 years old. The six children helped manage the farm. He was against slavery ever since he was a child and his family's home was a part of the Underground Railroad. He was educated at an academy in Canandaigua, New York, and West Bloomfield, New York. In the spring of 1852 when Gue was 24 years old, Gue and one of his brothers traveled to Iowa for land near Rock Creek in Scott County. The two brothers lived in a log cabin while preparing a farm and home for their family.

He married Elizabeth Parker on November 12, 1855, and they had four children. Elizabeth died on July 3, 1888. Gue died on June 1, 1904, and the funeral took place at his home.

== Career ==
Gue helped organize the Iowa Republican Party in February 1856 in Iowa City as a State Convention delegate. Gue co-wrote a bill written to start a state agricultural college and helped lead the bill's successful passage in 1857. He became a representative in 1858 to 1862 and he was a senator from 1862 to 1866. In the Senate, Gue participated in an act that prohibited foreign bank bills from being circulated in Iowa. Gue co-founded and helped fund Iowa State University in 1858, then known as Iowa Agricultural College. He became the editor and publisher of the Iowa Republican newspaper titled Iowa North West. He was elected president of the board of trustees of Iowa Agricultural College in 1866. Gue served as Lieutenant Governor from 1866 to 1868.

Despite much opposition, Gue advocated for and allowed women to attend Iowa State University. He helped select Adonijah Welch as President of the college. Gue moved from Fort Dodge to Des Moines to be the editor of the Iowa Homestead. Ulysses S. Grant appointed Gue as Pension Agent of Iowa and Nebraska and Gue had that role for eight years. Gue and his son bought The Homestead in 1880. He founded the Pioneer Law-Makers Association of Iowa. Gue co-founded the First Unitarian Church of Des Moines and the Iowa Unitarian Association. He worked on the four-volume History of Iowa for over 17 years. In 1881, Gue continued as editor of Iowa Homestead and published Origin and Early History of Iowa State College.

Political offices
Preceded by Enoch W. Eastman	Lieutenant Governor of Iowa; 1866–1868	Succeeded by John Scott
