= Jacob Dixon =

American politician (1832-1899)

Jacob W. Dixon (December 25, 1832 – January 1, 1899) was an American politician.

Portrait in History of Iowa From the Earliest Times to the Beginning of the Twentieth Century

Jacob Dixon was born in New Castle County, Delaware, on December 25, 1832, to James Dixon and his wife, née Heald. Jacob Dixon's mother could trace her ancestry to a family who settled the Province of Pennsylvania alongside William Penn. Dixon completed primary education in Pennsylvania public schools and was also taught by Milton Durnal of Uniontown, Pennsylvania. After leaving Durnal's academy, Dixon taught school for one term, then enrolled at the State and National Law School in Poughkeepsie, New York, for two years. Dixon moved to Ottumwa, Iowa, in 1855, where he started practicing law. The following year, he married Sarah Ann Vernon, who was also descended from Quaker settlers of the province of Pennsylvania.

Dixon was elected to the Iowa Senate in 1861 as a Republican for District 12. He was the first Republican elected to the state senate from Wapello County, and served from January 13, 1862, to January 7, 1866. Dixon served the latter half of his state senate term for District 13, as a result of redistricting prior to the 1863 Iowa Senate election. Dixon contested the 1873 Iowa House of Representatives election on the Anti-Monopoly Party ticket, and was elected to the District 6 seat by a coalition of political independents and Democrats. He took office on January 12, 1874, and, supported by the same coalition, faced legislative colleague John H. Gear for the speakership, to whom he lost. Dixon was reelected to the state house during the following election cycle on the Democratic Party ticket, serving until January 13, 1878. He subsequently retired from politics.

Dixon died in Ottumwa on January 1, 1899.
