= Andrew Oliphant Patterson =

American politician (1825–1887)

Andrew Oliphant Patterson (1825–1887) was an American politician.

Patterson was a Washington County, Pennsylvania, native born in 1825, who attended Jefferson College. After passing the bar in Uniontown, Pennsylvania, Patterson moved to Muscatine, Iowa, to practice law. He also served as president of the First National Bank of Muscatine. In 1855, Patterson married Mary Ann Elliott.

Patterson was a member of the Iowa Senate from January 11, 1858, to May 14, 1861, representing District 19 until January 8, 1860, and District 14 thereafter, as a Democrat. He began moving to Golden, Colorado, in 1859, and his family joined him in 1861. Patterson subsequently vacated his Iowa Senate seat, and was replaced by Joseph A. Green. In Colorado, Patterson was elected to represent Larimer and Weld counties in the first Colorado Territorial Legislature of 1864, but he did not assume the office. The following year, he was elected to the fourth Colorado Territorial Legislature by Jefferson County residents. In 1870, Patterson was secretary of the Legislative Council, and in 1876, served as justice of the peace for Clear Creek County.

Patterson died in Golden on March 6, 1887.
