= John Scott (Iowa politician) =

American politician (1824–1903)

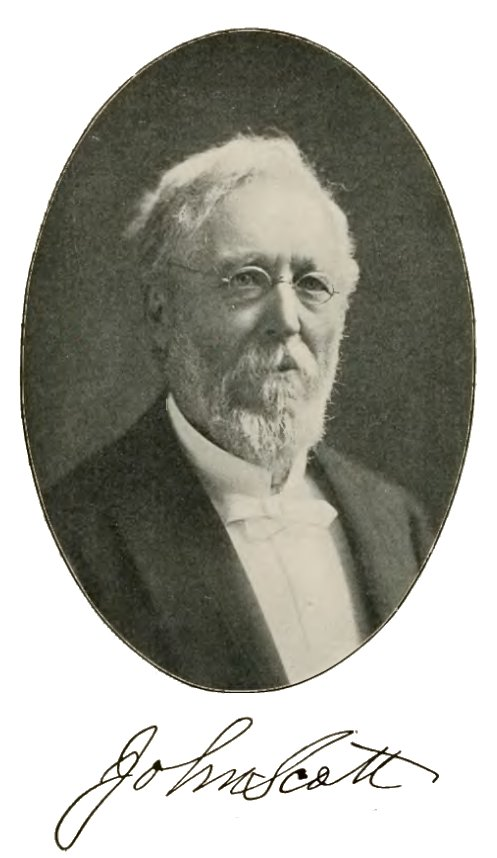

6th Lieutenant Governor of Iowa
- In office 1868–1870
- Governor: Samuel Merrill
- Preceded by: Benjamin F. Gue
- Succeeded by: Madison Miner Walden

Member of the Iowa State Senate
- In office January 9, 1860 – January 18, 1862
- In office January 11, 1886 – January 8, 1888

Personal details
- Born: April 14, 1811 Jefferson County, Ohio
- Died: September 23, 1903 (aged 92) Des Moines, Iowa
- Resting place: Nevada Municipal Cemetery

Military service
- Allegiance: United States Army; Union Army
- Years of service: 1846-1848; 1861-1865
- Rank: Colonel
- Unit: 3rd Iowa Infantry Regiment; 32nd Iowa Infantry Regiment
- Battles/wars: Mexican-American War; American Civil War

John Scott (April 14, 1811 – September 23, 1903) was an American politician, businessman, lawyer, and soldier.

Born in Jefferson County, Ohio, Scott taught school in Ohio and Kentucky. He studied law in Ohio and was admitted to the Ohio bar. While in Kentucky, he enlisted in the army and took part in the Mexican–American War. During his time in Mexico he was taken prisoner for several months. In 1854, Scott settled in Nevada, Iowa, where he practiced law and was in real estate. He was elected to the Iowa State Senate. During the American Civil War, Scott was a colonel in the 32nd Iowa Volunteer Infantry Regiment. After the Civil War, Scott was elected Lieutenant Governor of Iowa. Scott wrote books about the Scott family and the 32nd Infantry Regiment. He died in Des Moines, Iowa.

The 1880 census records his domestic servant/farm hand Billy Sunday.

Political offices
Preceded by Benjamin F. Gue	Lieutenant Governor of Iowa; 1868–1870	Succeeded by Madison Miner Walden
