= John R. Needham =

American politician (1824–1868)

John R. Needman

3rd Lieutenant Governor of Iowa
- In office January 19, 1862 – January 14, 1864
- Governor: Samuel Kirkwood
- Preceded by: Nicholas J. Rusch
- Succeeded by: Enoch W. Eastman

Member of the Iowa Senate
- In office December 6, 1852- November 30, 1856
- In office January 13, 1868- July 9, 1868

Personal details
- Born: December 18, 1824 Washington Court House, Ohio
- Died: July 9, 1868 (aged 43) Oskaloosa, Iowa

John R. Needham (December 18, 1824 – July 9, 1868) was an American Republican politician, lawyer, and newspaper editor who served as the 3rd Lieutenant Governor of Iowa from 1862 to 1864.

== Biography ==
He was born in Washington Court House, Ohio in 1824.

Needham studied law and was admitted to the bar in Cambridge, Ohio.

In 1849 he moved to Oskaloosa, Mahaska County, Iowa. On July 2, 1850 he founded The Oskaloosa Herald, originally called the Iowa Herald.

He was a member of the Methodist Episcopal Church.

== Political career ==
He served in the Iowa State Senate beginning in 1852, with the Whig Party, serving until 1856.

In 1857 Needham was nominated, but refused, to be a member of the convention to frame a new Constitution. He was then elected Lieutenant Governor between 1862 and 1864, serving under Governor Samuel J. Kirkwood.

In 1867, Needham was again re-elected to the Iowa Senate but died in 6 months into his four year term of office.

Political offices
Preceded by Nicholas J. Rusch	Lieutenant Governor of Iowa; 1862–1864	Succeeded by Enoch W. Eastman
