= Jairus Edward Neal =

American politician (1818–1882)

Jairus Edward Neal (18 August 1818 – 3 August 1882) was an American politician.

Neal was born on 18 August 1818 in Onondaga County, New York. From the age of 18, he taught at a country school. He settled in West Point, Iowa, in 1839 and later moved to Fort Madison to read law. In 1851, Neal married Catherine Brees. The family settled in Knoxville. Their daughter Emily later married Edward R. Cassatt. From May 1856, Neal was eligible to practice law before the United States District Court of Iowa, headquartered in Burlington.

Between 1854 and 1856, Neal was a member of the Iowa House of Representatives, elected from District 35 as a Democrat. Neal then served two four-year terms on the Iowa Senate, representing District 17 until 1860, and District 18 thereafter. While serving as a state senator, Neal contested the October 1861 House of Representatives election in Iowa, losing to James F. Wilson.

Neal moved from Knoxville to Keokuk in 1868, then to Staten Island in 1870. He returned to Knoxville by 1872 and established the Marion County National Bank. By June 1873, Neal relocated to Newton, Kansas, and became the president of the Harvey County Savings Bank. He divested from the Harvey County Savings Bank in 1879, and opened another bank later that year in Wellington, followed by another in Caldwell in 1882. Neal died on 3 August 1882. His residence in Newton, the Jairus Neal House, is listed on the National Register of Historic Places in Harvey County, Kansas.
