= Nicholas J. Rusch =

American politician (1822–1864)

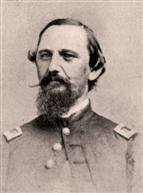

2nd Lieutenant Governor of Iowa
- In office January 11, 1860 – January 19, 1862
- Governor: Samuel J. Kirkwood
- Preceded by: Oran Faville
- Succeeded by: John R. Needham

Iowa's Commissioner of Immigration
- In office May 1860-1862
- Appointed by: Samuel J. Kirkwood

Member of the Iowa Senate
- In office December 1, 1856 - January 8, 1860

Personal details
- Born: February 16, 1822 Sankt Michaelisdonn, Holstein
- Died: September 22, 1864 (aged 42) Vicksburg, Mississippi
- Resting place: Pine Hill Cemetery (Davenport, Iowa); 41.56220°N 90.55580°W
- Party: Republican
- Children: 3
- Education: University of Kiel

Military service
- Branch/service: Union Army
- Years of service: September 28, 1862-September 22, 1864
- Rank: Captain

Nicholas J. Rusch (February 16, 1822 – September 22, 1864) was an American tutor, farmer, member of the Iowa Senate (1858–1860), the Lieutenant Governor of Iowa (1860–1862), Iowa's Commissioner of Immigration, and a captain in the Union Army during the American Civil War.

== Biography ==
Nicholas Johann Rusch was born on February 16, 1822, in Sankt Michaelisdonn, Holstein. He attended elementary school at Marne, the gymnasium at Meldorf, the Segeberg Seminary and the University of Kiel. He immigrated to the United States in 1847 and while en route he tutored the children in a family. He settled on a farm in Scott County, Iowa near the city of Davenport. He was part of the first wave of immigrants who settled in the area from Schleswig-Holstein.

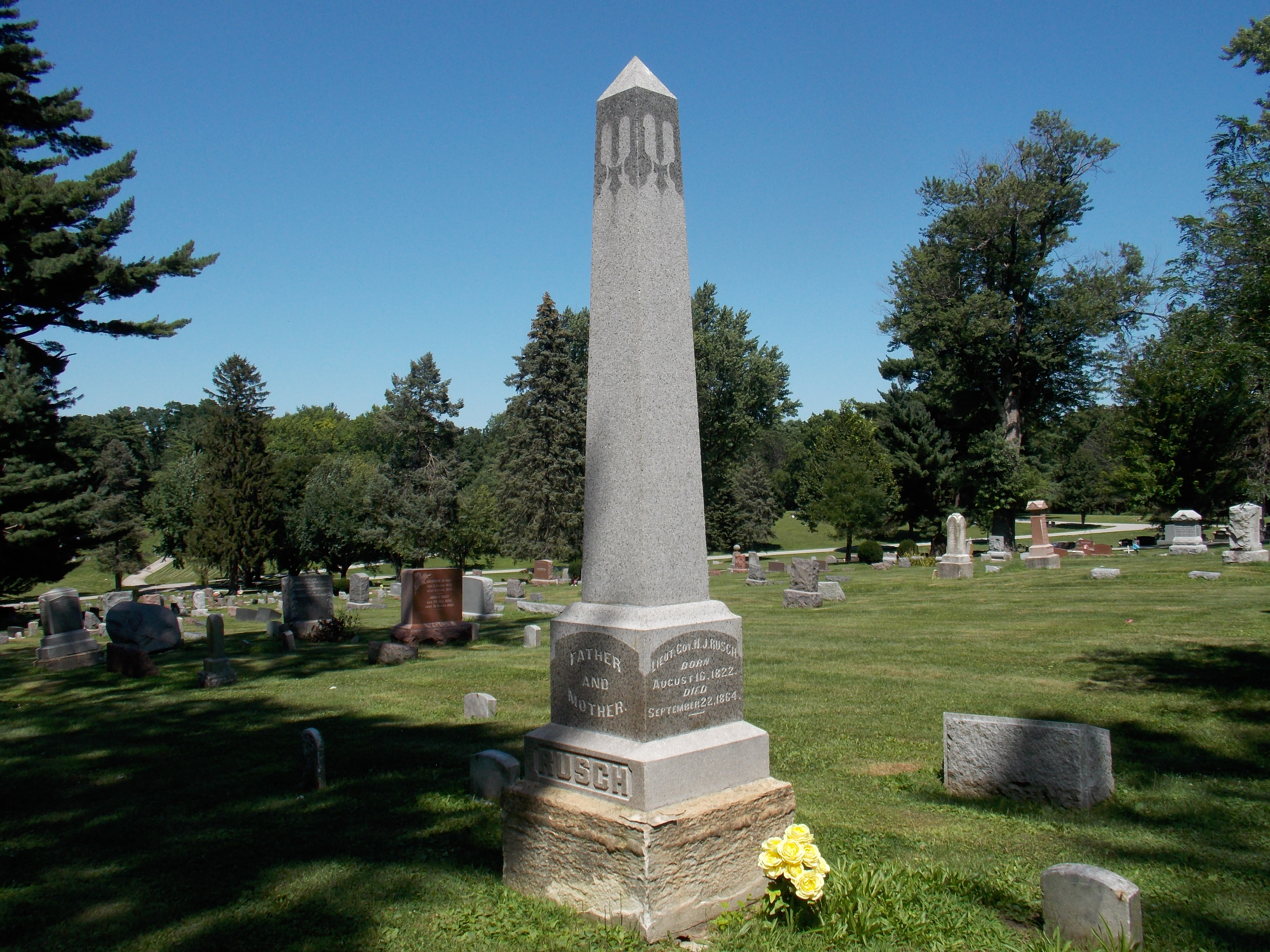
Rusch grave in Pine Hill Cemetery

Rusch soon acquired knowledge of the language, laws, and institutions of his adopted country. He was a member of the Republican Party and was nominated by Scott County Republicans to serve in the Iowa Senate in 1857. He won the general election and while in the Senate he focused his attention on alcohol laws, land ownership of foreign-born Iowans, and German language usage in official documents. He became an influential leader among German-Americans and within the Republican Party. In 1859 he was nominated by the Republican State Convention for Lieutenant Governor on the ticket with Samuel J. Kirkwood. As Lieutenant Governor, Rusch presided over the Iowa Senate for two years.

After serving his term, Rusch was appointed by Governor Kirkwood to be Iowa's Commissioner of Immigration. He spent his time in New York where he distributed promotional information about the state. He returned to Iowa ten months later as immigration nearly came to a halt during the Civil War. Rusch joined the Union Army when Kirkwood appointed him to the Commissary Department with the rank of captain. In Vicksburg, Mississippi, he developed a plan to protect Union steamboats on the Mississippi River from guerilla attacks by positioning lumberjacks along the river to provide steamboats with fuel and to interfere in case the boats were attacked. The plan was approved by General Ulysses S. Grant and Rusch left for New York where he recruited immigrants for his lumberjack army. Before he could be put his plan into action, however, Rusch died suddenly after his return to Vicksburg on September 22, 1864. He was buried in Pine Hill Cemetery in Davenport.

Political offices
Preceded by Oran Faville	Lieutenant Governor of Iowa; 1860–1862	Succeeded by John R. Needham
