= Thomas Drummond (politician) =

American politician

Thomas Drummond (c. 1833 – April 1865) was an American politician.

Drummond was a native of Virginia, born in about 1833. Aged about 22, he moved to Vinton, Iowa, and became the editor of the Vinton Eagle. The following year, Drummond was a delegate at the Republican National Convention. In 1857, Drummond was elected to the Iowa House of Representatives from District 10, which included Benton County at the time. In 1860, Drummond won election to the Iowa Senate as a representative of District 35. When the American Civil War broke out, he organized a volunteer corps and was commissioned as a lieutenant-colonel of the 4th Iowa Cavalry Regiment. Months later, Drummond was assigned a commission with the 5th U.S. Cavalry Regiment. He died of injuries sustained during the Battle of Five Forks.
