= Oran Faville =

American politician (1817–1872)

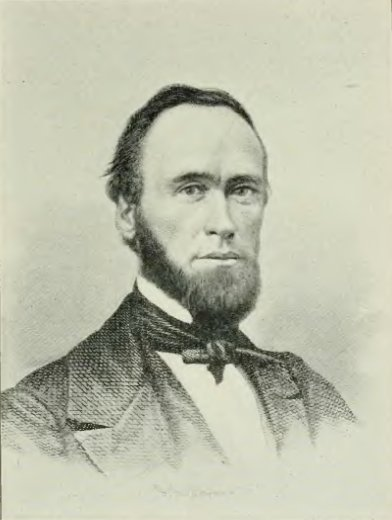

1st Lieutenant Governor of Iowa
- In office 1858–1860
- Governor: Ralph P. Lowe
- Preceded by: Office established
- Succeeded by: Nicholas J. Rusch

Mitchell County Judge
- In office 1860–1862
- Preceded by: Office established
- Succeeded by: Nicholas J. Rusch

Personal details
- Born: October 13, 1817 Manheim, New York, US
- Died: November 2, 1872 (aged 55) Waverly, Iowa, US
- Spouse: Maria Peck (m. 1845)
- Relatives: Chief Justice Frederick Faville (nephew)

Oran Faville (October 13, 1817 – November 2, 1872) was an American politician from Iowa.

== Early life ==
Faville was born on October 13, 1817, in Mannheim, New York, to Thomas Faville and Elizabeth 'Betsy' (née West) Faville. He was a great-grandson of Captain John Faville, shown on the Continental rolls as in command at Fishkill, New York, during the American Revolution. Faville graduated from Wesleyan University in 1844.

=== Teaching career ===
Faville became an ancient languages teacher at the Oneida Conference Seminary in Cazenovia, New York. He met a modern languages teacher at the Seminary named Maria Peck. He married Maria on July 24, 1845 in DeWitt, New York and they had no children.

Faville then taught school in New York and Vermont. In 1852, he was at McKendree College as an ancient languages professor. From 1853 to 1855 he was president of the Ohio Wesleyan Female College.

== Political career ==
In 1855, Faville moved to Mitchell County, Iowa, due to his failing health.

Faville was also the first county judge of Mitchell County, Iowa in 1859. Despite its title, the office was predominantly an executive one; the county judge ran the county much in the manner that the modern Board of Supervisors does today.

Faville, a Republican, served as the first Lieutenant Governor of Iowa from 1858 to 1860, under Governor Ralph P. Lowe. During his tenure he helped to get a free tuition law passed as well as abolishing the Office of Superindent of Public Instruction and moved the duties of that office to the Office the Secretary of the Board of Education.

From 1863 to 1867, Faville was an editor of the Iowa State Journal. He was later the first Iowa Superintendent of Public Instruction from 1864 until 1867 after he was the last secretary of the state board of education before the title of the office was changed to "superintendent of public instruction".

Faville was also the uncle of Chief Justice of the Iowa Supreme Court Frederick F. Faville, through his brother Judge and State Representative Amos S. Faville.

== Death ==
Faville died on November 2, 1872, aged 55, in Waverly, Iowa.

Political offices
Preceded by Office established	Lieutenant Governor of Iowa; 1858–1860	Succeeded by Nicholas J. Rusch
