= Marquis Lafayette McPherson =

American politician and lawyer (1822–1871)

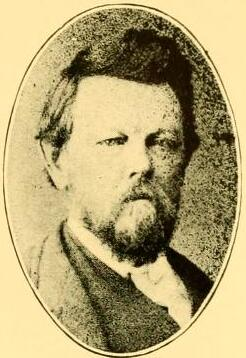
- Portrait of McPherson in a 1908 publication

Member of the Iowa Senate
- In office 1856–1862

Personal details
- Born: May 29, 1822
- Died: December 29, 1871 (aged 49) St. Louis, Missouri, U.S.
- Resting place: Fairview Cemetery; Council Bluffs, Iowa, U.S.
- Party: Republican
- Spouse: Mary Elizabeth Tibbles
- Children: 3
- Relatives: Smith McPherson (nephew)
- Education: Indiana Asbury College
- Occupation: Lawyer; politician

Marquis Lafayette McPherson (May 29, 1822 – December 29, 1871), sometimes known as Marcus L. McPherson, was an American politician and lawyer from Iowa. He served in the Iowa Senate from 1856 to 1862.

== Early life ==
Marquis Lafayette McPherson was born on May 29, 1822, in the Carolinas as one of four sons to Mary and William McPherson. His father was a farmer and harness maker. Around 1830, the family moved to Morgan County, Indiana. He was educated at Preston's country school. He attended Indiana Asbury College in Greencastle, Indiana, from 1846 to 1847. He then studied law in a law firm for a year under Algernon Sidney Griggs of Martinsville. He was a member of Beta Theta Pi. He went by Marcus L. McPherson since it was hard to explain how to pronounce his first name.

== Career ==
McPherson moved to Arkansas to practice law and returned to Indiana in two years. He taught at a schoolhouse in Indiana for about a year. He then went to be with his brother near Carthage, Illinois. He walked to Winterset, Iowa, and settled there in the spring of 1850. He taught one term of school at a log courthouse in Winterset. He also did manual labor, including cutting cordwood and splitting rails. He practiced law in Iowa. His law partner from 1859 to 1862 was G. N. Elliott. He served in the American Civil War. He was commissioned as a captain of commissary subsistence on March 6, 1862. He was later appointed as paymaster with the rank of major. He was brevetted as a lieutenant colonel and resigned on June 12, 1865. He served with the armies in Kentucky and Tennessee. In October 1866, he organized a Grand Army of the Republic post in Winterset and served as its first commander. Following the war, he started a law practice with B. F. Murray. He was involved in both civil and criminal trials.

McPherson was a Republican and gave temperance speeches in Madison County and surrounding counties. In 1856, he supported John C. Frémont for president. In 1857, he held an unofficial anti-slavery convention in Madison County where he was the principal speaker. He was a delegate-at-large at the 1860 Republican National Convention. He supported Abraham Lincoln for the nomination and was a presidential elector on the Republican ticket. He was elected to the Iowa Senate twice and served for eight years from 1856 to 1862. He was a member of the railroad and judiciary committees. He led the legislation to give women rights of property in Iowa, including the right to own property and to make contracts. In 1860, his name was mentioned for the role of Iowa Secretary of State. In 1861, he was named as a potential candidate for the U.S. Congress. In 1866, he was named as a candidate for nomination to the U.S. Congress, but later withdrew his name.

In the spring of 1869, McPherson moved to Council Bluffs and practiced law with D. W. Price. In 1870, he was elected as district attorney for the 3rd Iowa district and remained in that role until his death.

== Personal life ==
McPherson married Mary Elizabeth Tibbles of Illinois. They had three daughters, Ada, Ida, and Mary "Mamie". He lived in Winterset, Iowa, and later moved to Council Bluffs. His nephew was judge Smith McPherson.

In 1871, McPherson became ill and tried to recover his health in New York and St. Louis, Missouri. He died on December 29, 1871, at the Everett House in St. Louis. He was buried in Fairview Cemetery in Council Bluffs.
