= John Kern (Iowa politician) =

American politician (1833–1889)

John Kern (1833–1889) was an American politician.

John Kern and his wife Miriam Black moved from Ohio to Linn Township, Warren County, Iowa in 1857. He served in the American Civil War and attained the rank of major. After ending his military service, Kern and his wife moved to Norwalk in 1864, where their son Charles was born in 1867. Though John Kern lived in a heavily Republican area, he was elected to two terms as treasurer of Warren County and served on the Iowa Senate for District 29 from 1862 to 1864 as a Democrat.

Outside of politics, Kern was a Freemason and Methodist. He died on 17 June 1889 in Norwalk, aged 56.
