= 1871 Iowa Senate election =

- October 10, 1871

34 out of 50 seats in the Iowa State Senate 26 seats needed for a majority
	Majority party	Minority party
Party	Republican	Democratic
Last election	43	7
Seats after	42	8
Seat change	▼1	▲1

In the 1871 Iowa State Senate elections, Iowa voters elected state senators to serve in the fourteenth Iowa General Assembly. Elections were held in 34 of the state senate's 49 districts. (Note: At the time, the Iowa Senate had several multi-member districts.) State senators serve four-year terms in the Iowa State Senate.

The general election took place on October 10, 1871.

Following the previous election, Republicans had control of the Iowa Senate with 43 seats to Democrats' seven seats.

To claim control of the chamber from Republicans, the Democrats needed to net 19 Senate seats.

Republicans maintained control of the Iowa State Senate following the 1871 general election with the balance of power shifting to Republicans holding 42 seats and Democrats having eight seats (a net gain of 1 seat for Democrats).

== Summary of Results ==
- Note: The holdover Senators not up for re-election are not listed on this table.

Senate District	Incumbent	Party	Elected Senator	Party	Outcome
3rd	Henry Clay Traverse	Rep	Horatio A. Wonn	Dem	Dem Gain
4th	William Fields Vermillion	Rep	Edward J. Gault	Dem	Dem Gain
5th	Edward M. Bill	Rep	Martin Read (Note: Senator Read resigned during the next term, causing a vacancy.)	Rep	Rep Hold
6th	James D. Wright	Rep	Robert A. Dague	Rep	Rep Hold
7th	Isaac W. Keller	Rep	Elisha Todd Smith	Rep	Rep Hold
8th	Napoleon Bonaparte Moore	Rep	James Stormant McIntyre	Rep	Rep Hold
9th	Jefferson P. Casady	Dem	John Young Stone	Rep	Rep Gain
12th	Abial Richmond Pierce	Rep	Moses Ayres McCoid	Rep	Rep Hold
13th (Note: Election was held to fill a vacancy.)	Augustus Harvey Hamilton (Note: Senator Hamilton resigned, causing a vacancy.)	Rep	Joseph Henry Merrill	Rep	Rep Hold
15th	Granville Gaylord Bennett	Rep	Joseph Decker Miles	Rep	Rep Hold
18th	John Nicholas Dixon	Rep	James Addison Young (Note: On March 9, 1875, Senator Young died during the next term, causing a vacancy.)	Rep	Rep Hold
19th	John M. Cathcart	Rep	John L. McCormack	Dem	Dem Gain
20th	George E. Griffith	Rep	Mark Antony Dashiell	Rep	Rep Hold
24th	William Penn Wolf (Note: On December 5, 1870, Senator Wolf resigned from the Iowa Senate to take his seat in the United States House of Representatives, causing a vacancy.)	Rep	John C. Chambers	Rep	Rep Hold
25th	Samuel Husband Fairall	Dem	Samuel Husband Fairall	Dem	Dem Hold
26th	Matthew Long	Rep	James P. Ketcham (Note: On April 24, 1872, Senator Ketcham resigned during the next term, causing a vacancy.)	Rep	Rep Hold
30th	Lewis Brigham Dunham	Dem	Lewis W. Stuart	Dem	Dem Hold
32nd	Robert Smyth	Rep	Ezekiel Boring Kephart	Rep	Rep Hold
33rd	James Chapin	Rep	John Shane	Rep	Rep Hold
34th	Wells Sylvanus Rice	Rep	Robert Howe Taylor	Rep	Rep Hold
35th (Note: The 35th transitioned from a 2- to 1-member district.)	Frederick M. Knoll	Dem	Benjamin Billings Richards	Dem	Dem Hold
35th	Michael B. Mulkern (Note: On February 8, 1871, Senator Mulkern died, causing a vacancy.)	Dem	Benjamin Billings Richards	Dem	Dem Hold
36th	Joseph Grimes	Rep	Albert Boomer	Rep	Rep Hold
37th	William G. Donnan (Note: On March 3, 1871, Senator Donnan resigned from the Iowa Senate to take his seat in the United States House of Representatives, causing a vacancy.)	Rep	George Washington Bemis	Rep	Rep Hold
38th	George William Couch (Note: Senator Couch resigned, causing a vacancy.)	Rep	John Hooker Leavitt	Rep	Rep Hold
39th	Homer E. Newell	Rep	Oliver Wolcott Crary	Rep	Rep Hold
40th	William Larrabee	Rep	William Larrabee	Rep	Rep Hold
41st	Liberty E. Fellows	Dem	Samuel Horace Kinne	Dem	Dem Hold
42nd	Henry Clay Bulis (Note: On March 3, 1871, Senator Bulis resigned from the Iowa Senate to serve as the Lieutenant Governor of Iowa, causing a vacancy.)	Rep	George R. Willett	Rep	Rep Hold
43rd	John G. Patterson	Rep	Alonzo Converse	Rep	Rep Hold
44th	Emmons Johnson (Note: Senator Johnson resigned, causing a vacancy.)	Rep	John E. Burke	Rep	Rep Hold
45th	Isaac J. Mitchell	Rep	George M. Maxwell	Rep	Rep Hold
46th	Marcus Tuttle	Rep	Elisha A. Howland	Rep	Rep Hold
47th	Theodore Hawley	Rep	William H. Fitch	Rep	Rep Hold
49th (Note: The 49th district was newly created following redistricting.)	Newly created district		John J. Russell	Rep	Rep Gain

== Detailed Results ==
- NOTE: The Iowa Official Register does not contain detailed vote totals for state senate elections in 1871.

== See also ==
- Elections in Iowa
