= 1867 Iowa Senate election =

- October 8, 1867

34 out of 49 seats in the Iowa State Senate 25 seats needed for a majority
	Majority party	Minority party	Third party
Party	Republican	Democratic	Populist
Last election	42	6	0
Seats after	40 (Note: The Iowa Senate expanded from 48 seats to 49 seats following the 1867 general election.)	8	1
Seat change	▼2	▲2	▲1
President of the Iowa Senate (Note: Article IV, section 18, of the Constitution of Iowa at that time established that the Lieutenant Governor of Iowa shall perform the duties of the President of the Senate. The Lieutenant Governor performed the duties of President of the Senate from January 11, 1858 through January 14, 1991. As of 1991, duties of Iowa's Lieutenant Governor no longer include presiding over the state Senate.) before election
Benjamin F. Gue (Note: As Lieutenant Governor, Benjamin F. Gue was the twelfth President of the Iowa Senate. He served during the eleventh Iowa General Assembly, succeeding Republican Enoch W. Eastman in that leadership position.)
Republican
Elected President of the Iowa Senate
John Scott (Note: As the next Lieutenant Governor, John Scott was the thirteenth President of the Iowa Senate. He served during the twelfth Iowa General Assembly, succeeding Republican Benjamin F. Gue in that leadership position.)
Republican

In the 1867 Iowa State Senate elections, Iowa voters elected state senators to serve in the twelfth Iowa General Assembly. Following the expansion of the Iowa Senate from 48 to 49 seats in 1867, elections were held for 34 of the state senate's 49 seats. (Note: At the time, the Iowa Senate had several multi-member districts.) State senators serve four-year terms in the Iowa State Senate.

The general election took place on October 8, 1867.

Following the previous election in 1865, Republicans had control of the Iowa Senate with 42 seats to Democrats' six seats.

To claim control of the chamber from Republicans, the Democrats needed to net 19 Senate seats.

Republicans maintained control of the Iowa State Senate following the election with the balance of power shifting to Republicans holding 40 seats, Democrats having eight seats, and a lone seat for the People's Party (a net gain of 2 seats for Democrats and 1 seat for the People's Party).

== Summary of Results ==
- Note: The holdover Senators not up for re-election are not listed on this table.

Senate District	Incumbent	Party	Elected Senator	Party	Outcome
3rd (Note: The third district was a 1-member district at the time.)	Samuel Alphonso Moore	Rep	Henry Clay Traverse	Rep	Rep Hold
4th (Note: The fourth district was a 1-member district at the time.)	Nathan Udell	Dem	Madison Miner Walden	Rep	Rep Gain
5th (Note: The fifth district was a 1-member district at the time.)	Eugene Edgar Edwards	Rep	James D. Wright	Rep	Rep Hold
6th (Note: The sixth district was a 1-member district at the time.)	C. G. Bridges	Rep	Edward M. Bill	Rep	Rep Hold
7th (Note: The seventh district was a 1-member district at the time.)	L. W. Hillyer	Rep	Isaac W. Keller	Rep	Rep Hold
8th (Note: The eighth district was a 1-member district at the time.)	Lewis Williams Ross	Rep	Napoleon Bonaparte Moore	Rep	Rep Hold
9th (Note: The ninth district was a 1-member district at the time.)	Fitz Henry Warren	Rep	Jefferson P. Casady	Dem	Dem Gain
10th (Note: The tenth district was a 1-member district at the time.)	Theron Webb Woolson (Note: Senator Woolson was an incumbent holdover senator not up for re-election. Instead, he was redistricted from district 10 to 11.)	Rep	Charles Leopold Matthies (Note: During the next term, Senator Matties died on October 16, 1868, causing a vacancy in his seat.)	Rep	Rep Hold
11th (Note: The eleventh district was a 1-member district at the time.)	Daniel P. Stubbs	Rep	Theron Webb Woolson	Rep	Rep Hold
12th (Note: The twelfth district was a 1-member district at the time.)	Edward Holcomb Stiles	Rep	Abial Richmond Pierce	Rep	Rep Hold
13th (Note: The thirteenth district was a 1-member district at the time.)	William Castlebury Shippen	Rep	Augustus Harvey Hamilton	Rep	Rep Hold
15th (Note: The fifteenth district was a 1-member district at the time.)	John Abbott Parvin (Note: Senator Parvin was an incumbent senator. However, he was up for re-election. He was redistricted from district 15 to 16.)	Rep	Granville Gaylord Bennett	Rep	Rep Hold
16th (Note: The sixteenth district was a 1-member district at the time.)	John Ferguson McJunkin	Rep	John Abbott Parvin	Rep	Rep Hold
17th (Note: The seventeenth district was a 1-member district at the time.)	Ezekiel Silas Sampson	Rep	John C. Johnson	Rep	Rep Hold
18th (Note: The eighteenth district was a 1-member district at the time.)	J. A. L. Crookham	Rep	John R. Needham (Note: During the next term, Senator Needham died on July 9, 1868, causing a vacancy in his seat.)	Rep	Rep Hold
19th (Note: The nineteenth district was a 1-member district at the time.)	Thomas McMillan	Rep	Thomas McMillan	Rep	Rep Hold
20th (Note: The twentieth district was a 1-member district at the time.)	William McMarshman	Rep	George E. Griffith	Rep	Rep Hold
22nd (Note: The twenty-second district was a 2-member district at the time. However, Senator Larimer was a holdover incumbent and not up for re-election.)	Joseph B. Leake	Rep	W. W. Cones	People's	People's Gain
24th (Note: The twenty-fourth district was a 1-member district at the time.)	Henry Wharton	Rep	William Penn Wolf (Note: During the next term, Senator Wolf resigned on March 3, 1869, causing a vacancy in his seat.)	Rep	Rep Hold
25th (Note: The twenty-fifth district was a 1-member district at the time.)	Ezekiel Clark	Rep	Samuel Husband Fairall	Dem	Dem Gain
26th (Note: The twenty-sixth district was a 1-member district at the time.)	Marsena Edgar Cutts	Rep	Matthew Long	Rep	Rep Hold
29th (Note: The twenty-ninth district was a 1-member district at the time.)	John Hilsinger	Rep	Lewis Brigham Dunham	Dem	Dem Gain
31st (Note: The thirty-first district was a 1-member district at the time.)	Joseph Barris Young	Rep	Robert Smyth	Rep	Rep Hold
32nd (Note: The thirty-second district was a 1-member district at the time.)	William B. King	Rep	James Chapin	Rep	Rep Hold
33rd (Note: The thirty-third district was a 1-member district at the time.)	Henry Clay Henderson	Rep	Wells Sylvanus Rice	Rep	Rep Hold
34th (Note: The thirty-fourth district was a 2-member district at the time. However, Senator Richards was a holdover incumbent and not up for re-election.)	Frederick M. Knoll	Dem	Frederick M. Knoll	Dem	Dem Hold
35th (Note: The thirty-fifth district was a 1-member district at the time.)	John M. Brayton	Rep	Joseph Grimes	Rep	Rep Hold
36th (Note: The thirty-sixth district was a 1-member district at the time.)	Leonard Wells Hart	Rep	William G. Donnan	Rep	Rep Hold
37th (Note: The thirty-seventh district was a 1-member district at the time.)	Benjamin T. Hunt	Rep	Homer E. Newell	Rep	Rep Hold
38th (Note: The thirty-eighth district was a 1-member district at the time.)	William Benjamin Lakin	Rep	William Larrabee	Rep	Rep Hold
39th (Note: The thirty-ninth district was a 1-member district at the time.)	Coker F. Clarkson	Rep	Marcus Tuttle	Rep	Rep Hold
41st (Note: The forty-first district was a 1-member district at the time.)	Charles Paulk	Dem	Liberty E. Fellows	Dem	Dem Hold
43rd (Note: The forty-third district was a 1-member district at the time.)	John G. Patterson	Rep	John G. Patterson	Rep	Rep Hold
44th (Note: The forty-fourth district was a 1-member district at the time.)	George W. Bassett (Note: Senator Bassett was an incumbent senator. However, he was up for re-election. He was redistricted from district 44 to 45.)	Rep	Isaac J. Mitchell	Rep	Rep Hold
45th (Note: The forty-fifth district was a 1-member district at the time.)	Addison Oliver (Note: Senator Oliver was an incumbent holdover senator not up for re-election. Instead, he was redistricted from district 45 to 46.)	Rep	Theodore Hawley	Rep	Rep Hold
46th (Note: The forty-sixth district was a newly created 1-member district at the time.)	Newly created district		Addison Oliver	Rep	Rep Gain

== Detailed Results ==
- NOTE: The Iowa General Assembly does not provide detailed vote totals for Iowa State Senate elections in 1867.

== See also ==
- Elections in Iowa
