= 1869 Iowa Senate election =

- October 12, 1869

21 out of 50 seats in the Iowa State Senate 26 seats needed for a majority
	Majority party	Minority party	Third party
Party	Republican	Democratic	Populist
Last election	40	8	1
Seats before	37 (Note: Following the 1867 Iowa Senate election, Republicans held 40 seats to Democrats' 8 and a lone seat held by a People's Party member. However, three changes occurred during the twelfth general assembly. In the tenth district, Republican Senator Charles Leopold Matthies died on October 16, 1868, causing a vacancy in his seat. In the eighteenth district, Republican Senator John R. Needham died on July 9, 1868, causing a vacancy in his seat. In the twenty-fourth district, Republican Senator William Penn Wolf resigned on March 3, 1869, causing a vacancy in his seat. All three seats were left vacant until the next election. Therefore, by election day in 1869, the Republicans held 37 seats, the Democrats held 8 seats, there was a lone People's Party member, and three seats were vacant (all the vacancies had been held by Republicans).)	8	1
Seats after	43 (Note: The Iowa Senate expanded from 49 seats to 50 seats following the 1869 general election.)	7	0
Seat change	▲6	▼1	▼1
President of the Iowa Senate (Note: Article IV, section 18, of the Constitution of Iowa at that time established that the Lieutenant Governor of Iowa shall perform the duties of the President of the Senate. The Lieutenant Governor performed the duties of President of the Senate from January 11, 1858 through January 14, 1991. As of 1991, duties of Iowa's Lieutenant Governor no longer include presiding over the state Senate.) before election
John Scott (Note: As Lieutenant Governor, John Scott was the thirteenth President of the Iowa Senate. He served during the twelfth Iowa General Assembly, succeeding Republican Benjamin F. Gue in that leadership position.)
Republican
Elected President of the Iowa Senate
Henry Clay Bulis (Note: As the next Lieutenant Governor, Henry Clay Bulis was the fourteenth President of the Iowa Senate. He served during the thirteenth Iowa General Assembly, succeeding Republican John Scott in that leadership position.)
Republican

In the 1869 Iowa State Senate elections, Iowa voters elected state senators to serve in the thirteenth Iowa General Assembly. Following the expansion of the Iowa Senate from 49 to 50 seats in 1869, elections were held for 21 of the state senate's 50 seats. (Note: At the time, the Iowa Senate had several multi-member districts.) State senators serve four-year terms in the Iowa State Senate.

The general election took place on October 12, 1869.

Following the previous election in 1867, Republicans had control of the Iowa Senate with 40 seats to Democrats' eight seats and a lone member from the People's Party. However, three changes occurred during the twelfth general assembly. In the tenth district, Republican Senator Charles Leopold Matthies died on October 16, 1868, causing a vacancy in his seat. In the eighteenth district, Republican Senator John R. Needham died on July 9, 1868, causing a vacancy in his seat. In the twenty-fourth district, Republican Senator William Penn Wolf resigned on March 3, 1869, causing a vacancy in his seat. All three seats were left vacant until the next election. Therefore, by election day in 1869, the Republicans held 37 seats, the Democrats held 8 seats, there was a lone People's Party member, and three seats were vacant (all the vacancies had been held by Republicans).

To claim control of the chamber from Republicans, the Democrats needed to net 18 Senate seats.

Republicans maintained control of the Iowa State Senate following the election with the balance of power shifting to Republicans holding 43 seats and Democrats having seven seats (a net gain of 6 seats for Republicans).

== Summary of Results ==
- Note: The holdover Senators not up for re-election are not listed on this table.

Senate District	Incumbent	Party	Elected Senator	Party	Outcome
1st (Note: The first district transitioned from a 2- to 1-member district.)	Nathaniel Hedges	Dem	Exum Sumner McCulloch	Dem	Dem Hold
1st	Joseph Hollman	Dem	Obsolete subdistrict		
2nd (Note: The second district was a 1-member district at the time.)	Eliab Doud	Rep	Jacob Garretson Vale	Rep	Rep Hold
4th (Note: The fourth district was a 1-member district at the time.)	Madison Miner Walden	Rep	William Fields Vermillion	Rep	Rep Hold
5th (Note: The fifth district was a 1-member district at the time.)	James D. Wright (Note: Senator Wright was an incumbent holdover senator not up for re-election. Instead, he was redistricted from district 5 to 6.)	Rep	Edward M. Bill (Note: Senator Bill was an incumbent holdover senator not up for re-election. Instead, he was redistricted from district 6 to 5.)	Rep	Rep Hold
6th (Note: The sixth district was a 1-member district at the time.)	Edward M. Bill	Rep	James D. Wright	Rep	Rep Hold
10th (Note: The tenth district was a 1-member district at the time.)	Charles Leopold Matthies (Note: In the tenth district, Republican Senator Charles Leopold Matthies died on October 16, 1868, causing a vacancy in his seat.)	Rep	Charles Beardsley	Rep	Rep Hold
11th (Note: The eleventh district was a 1-member district at the time.)	Theron Webb Woolson	Rep	John Patterson West	Rep	Rep Hold
14th (Note: The fourteenth district was a 1-member district at the time.)	James M. Robertson	Rep	James Simpson Hurley	Rep	Rep Hold
16th (Note: The sixteenth district was a 1-member district at the time.)	John Abbott Parvin	Rep	Samuel McNutt	Rep	Rep Hold
17th (Note: The seventeenth district was a 1-member district at the time.)	John C. Johnson	Rep	Joseph W. Havens	Rep	Rep Hold
18th (Note: The eighteenth district was a 1-member district at the time.)	John R. Needham (Note: Senator Needham died on July 9, 1868, causing a vacancy in his seat.)	Rep	John Nicholas Dixon	Rep	Rep Hold
19th (Note: The nineteenth district was a 1-member district at the time.)	Thomas McMillan	Rep	John M. Cathcart	Rep	Rep Hold
21st (Note: The twenty-first district was a 1-member district at the time.)	Joseph Rea Reed	Rep	Benjamin Franklin Murray	Rep	Rep Hold
22nd (Note: The twenty-second district was a 2-member district at the time.)	Andrew McCune Larimer	Rep	Hans Reimer Claussen	Rep	Rep Hold
22nd	W. W. Cones	People's	Robert Lowry	Rep	Rep Gain
23rd (Note: The twenty-third district was a 1-member district at the time.)	John Henry Smith	Rep	Alexander Baird Ireland	Rep	Rep Hold
27th (Note: The twenty-seventh district was a 1-member district at the time.)	John Meyer	Rep	Joseph Dysart	Rep	Rep Hold
28th (Note: The twenty-eighth district was a 1-member district at the time.)	Jonathan Wright Cattell	Rep	Frank T. Campbell	Rep	Rep Hold
29th (Note: The twenty-ninth district was a 1-member district at the time.)	Lewis Brigham Dunham (Note: Senator Dunham was an incumbent holdover senator not up for re-election. Instead, he was redistricted from district 29 to 30.)	Dem	Benjamin Franklin Allen	Rep	Rep Gain
30th (Note: The thirtieth district was a 1-member district at the time.)	Sewall Spaulding Farwell	Rep	Lewis Brigham Dunham	Dem	Dem Gain
31st (Note: The thirty-first district was a 1-member district at the time.)	Robert Smyth (Note: Senator Smyth was an incumbent holdover senator not up for re-election. Instead, he was redistricted from district 31 to 32.)	Rep	John McKean	Rep	Rep Hold
32nd (Note: The thirty-second district was a 1-member district at the time.)	James Chapin (Note: Senator Chapin was an incumbent holdover senator not up for re-election. Instead, he was redistricted from district 32 to 33.)	Rep	Robert Smyth	Rep	Rep Hold
33rd (Note: The thirty-third district was a 1-member district at the time.)	Wells Sylvanus Rice (Note: Senator Rice was an incumbent holdover senator not up for re-election. Instead, he was redistricted from district 33 to 34.)	Rep	James Chapin	Rep	Rep Hold
34th (Note: The thirty-fourth district transitioned from a 2- to 1-member district.)	Frederick M. Knoll (Note: Senator Knoll was an incumbent holdover senator not up for re-election. Instead, he was redistricted from district 34 to 35.)	Dem	Wells Sylvanus Rice	Rep	Rep Gain
34th	Benjamin Billings Richards (Note: Senator Richards was an incumbent who was up for re-election. He was redistricted from district 34 to 35.)	Dem	Obsolete subdistrict		
35th (Note: The thirty-fifth district transitioned from a 1- to 2-member district at the time.)	Joseph Grimes (Note: Senator Grimes was an incumbent holdover senator not up for re-election. Instead, he was redistricted from district 35 to 36.)	Rep	Frederick M. Knoll	Dem	Dem Gain
35th	Newly created subdistrict		Michael B. Mulkern (Note: On February 8, 1871, Senator Mulkern died, causing a vacancy.)	Dem	Dem Gain
36th (Note: The thirty-sixth district was a 1-member district at the time.)	William G. Donnan (Note: Senator Donnan was an incumbent holdover senator not up for re-election. Instead, he was redistricted from district 36 to 37.)	Rep	Joseph Grimes	Rep	Rep Hold
37th (Note: The thirty-seventh district was a 1-member district at the time.)	Homer E. Newell (Note: Senator Newell was an incumbent holdover senator not up for re-election. Instead, he was redistricted from district 37 to 39.)	Rep	William G. Donnan	Rep	Rep Hold
38th (Note: The thirty-eighth district was a 1-member district at the time.)	William Larrabee (Note: Senator Larrabee was an incumbent holdover senator not up for re-election. Instead, he was redistricted from district 38 to 40.)	Rep	George William Couch	Rep	Rep Hold
39th (Note: The thirty-ninth district was a 1-member district at the time.)	Marcus Tuttle (Note: Senator Tuttle was an incumbent holdover senator not up for re-election. Instead, he was redistricted from district 39 to 46.)	Rep	Homer E. Newell	Rep	Rep Hold
40th (Note: The fortieth district was a 1-member district at the time.)	James B. Powers	Rep	William Larrabee	Rep	Rep Hold
44th (Note: The forty-fourth district was a 1-member district at the time.)	Isaac J. Mitchell (Note: Senator Mitchell was an incumbent holdover senator not up for re-election. Instead, he was redistricted from district 44 to 45.)	Rep	Emmons Johnson	Rep	Rep Hold
45th (Note: The forty-fifth district was a 1-member district at the time.)	Theodore Hawley (Note: Senator Hawley was an incumbent holdover senator not up for re-election. Instead, he was redistricted from district 45 to 47.)	Rep	Isaac J. Mitchell	Rep	Rep Hold
46th (Note: The forty-sixth district was a 1-member district at the time.)	Addison Oliver	Rep	Marcus Tuttle	Rep	Rep Hold
47th (Note: The forty-seventh district was a newly created 1-member district at the time.)	Newly created district		Theodore Hawley	Rep	Rep Gain
48th (Note: The forty-eighth district was a newly created 1-member district at the time.)	Newly created district		Charles Atkins	Rep	Rep Gain

== Detailed Results ==
- NOTE: The Iowa General Assembly does not provide detailed vote totals for Iowa State Senate elections in 1869.

== See also ==
- Elections in Iowa
