= 1960 Iowa Senate election =

- November 8, 1960

29 out of 50 seats in the Iowa State Senate 26 seats needed for a majority
	Majority party	Minority party
Leader	Jack Schroeder	George E. O'Malley
Party	Republican	Democratic
Leader's seat	21st	30th
Last election	33	17
Seats after	35	15
Seat change	▲2	▼2
Majority Leader before election
Jack Schroeder
Republican
Elected Majority Leader
J. Kendall Lynes
Republican

The 1960 Iowa State Senate elections took place as part of the biennial 1960 United States elections. Iowa voters elected state senators in 29 of the state senate's 50 districts. State senators serve four-year terms in the Iowa State Senate.

A statewide map of the 50 state Senate districts in the year 1960 is provided by the Iowa General Assembly here.

The primary election on June 6, 1960, determined which candidates appeared on the November 8, 1960 general election ballot.

Following the previous election, Republicans had control of the Iowa state Senate with 33 seats to Democrats' 17 seats.

To claim control of the chamber from Republicans, the Democrats needed to net 9 Senate seats.

Republicans maintained control of the Iowa State Senate following the 1960 general election with the balance of power shifting to Republicans holding 35 seats and Democrats having 15 seats (a net gain of 2 seats for Republicans).

== Summary of Results ==
- Note: The 21 holdover Senators not up for re-election are not listed on this table.

State Senate District	Incumbent	Party	Incoming Senator	Party
2nd	Norval Evans	Rep	Dewey Blake Phelps	Rep
3rd	Gene L. Hoffman	Dem	Joe N. Wilson	Rep
4th	William C. Stuart	Rep	William C. Stuart	Rep
5th	Xavier Thomas Prentis	Rep	Xavier Thomas Prentis	Rep
6th	Francis Austin Turner	Rep	Orval C. Walter	Dem
8th	William H. Harbor	Rep	Edward Anderson Wearin	Rep
11th	J. Louis Fisher	Rep	J. Louis Fisher	Rep
14th	Carroll F. McCurdy	Dem	John Gray	Rep
15th	Carroll Price	Rep	Carroll Price	Rep
16th	Raymond R. Gillespie	Dem	Joseph B. Flatt	Rep
17th	Gerald William Prince	Rep	Harry L. Cowden	Rep
19th	Jim O. Henry	Rep	Richard C. Turner	Rep
23rd	David Earl Elijah	Rep	David Earl Elijah	Rep
24th	Jans T. "J. T." Dykhouse	Rep	Jans T. "J. T." Dykhouse	Rep
25th	Daniel Clifford "D. C." Nolan	Rep	Daniel Clifford "D. C." Nolan	Rep
26th	Frank C. Byers	Rep	Martin Wiley	Rep
27th	C. Joseph Coleman	Dem	C. Joseph Coleman	Dem
28th	Howard C. Buck	Rep	Howard C. Buck	Rep
31st	Carl H. Ringgenberg	Rep	Clifford N. Nystrom	Rep
32nd	Jack Richard Miller	Rep	Charles S. Van Eaton	Rep
33rd	Irving D. Long	Rep	Irving D. Long	Rep
36th	John J. O'Connor	Dem	Adolph W. Elvers	Dem
39th	J. Kendall Lynes	Rep	J. Kendall Lynes	Rep
40th	George Lindsey Scott	Rep	George Lindsey Scott	Rep
41st	Jacob Grimstead	Rep	Jacob Grimstead	Rep
43rd	Walter E. Edelen	Dem	Leigh Raymond Curran	Rep
46th	Laurence M. Boothby	Rep	J. Henry Lucken	Rep
47th	LeRoy Getting	Rep	LeRoy Getting	Rep
49th	Duane E. Dewel	Rep	John J. Brown	Dem

== Detailed Results ==
- NOTE: The 21 districts that did not hold elections in 1960 are not listed here.
- Note: The Iowa Secretary of State's website does not document any competitive intra-party primaries for state Senate races in 1960.

=== District 2 ===
Iowa Senate, District 2 General Election, 1960
Party	Candidate	Votes	%
Republican	Dewey B. Phelps	7,233	61.2
Democratic	Melvin D. Crist	4,582	38.8
Total votes		11,815	100.0
Republican hold			

=== District 3 ===
Iowa Senate, District 3 General Election, 1960
Party	Candidate	Votes	%
Republican	Joe N. Wilson	6,657	51.6
Democratic	Gene L. Hoffman (incumbent)	6,241	48.4
Total votes		12,898	100.0
Republican gain from Democratic			

=== District 4 ===
Iowa Senate, District 4 General Election, 1960
Party	Candidate	Votes	%
Republican	W. C. Stuart (incumbent)	6,311	56.2
Democratic	B. D. Hellyer	4,924	43.8
Total votes		11,235	100.0
Republican hold			

=== District 5 ===
Iowa Senate, District 5 General Election, 1960
Party	Candidate	Votes	%
Republican	X. T. Prentis (incumbent)	8,810	54.1
Democratic	Herman Fenema	7,487	45.9
Total votes		16,297	100.0
Republican hold			

=== District 6 ===
Iowa Senate, District 6 General Election, 1960
Party	Candidate	Votes	%
Democratic	Orval C. Walter	4,958	54.9
Republican	Henry G. Bycroft	4,067	45.1
Total votes		9,025	100.0
Democratic gain from Republican			

=== District 8 ===
Iowa Senate, District 8 General Election, 1960
Party	Candidate	Votes	%
Republican	Edward A. Wearin	8,003	65.1
Democratic	Arleigh E. Odem	4,289	34.9
Total votes		12,292	100.0
Republican hold			

=== District 11 ===
Iowa Senate, District 11 General Election, 1960
Party	Candidate	Votes	%
Republican	J. Louis Fisher (incumbent)	7,446	52.8
Democratic	James E. Hatcher	6,657	47.2
Total votes		14,103	100.0
Republican hold			

=== District 14 ===
Iowa Senate, District 14 General Election, 1960
Party	Candidate	Votes	%
Republican	John Gray	5,468	53.5
Democratic	Carroll F. McCurdy (incumbent)	4,761	46.5
Total votes		10,229	100.0
Republican gain from Democratic			

=== District 15 ===
Iowa Senate, District 15 General Election, 1960
Party	Candidate	Votes	%
Republican	Carroll L. Price (incumbent)	9,148	55.2
Democratic	Edward G. Doughman	7,411	44.8
Total votes		16,559	100.0
Republican hold			

=== District 16 ===
Iowa Senate, District 16 General Election, 1960
Party	Candidate	Votes	%
Republican	Joseph B. Flatt	6,483	55.4
Democratic	Merlyn Sulgrove	5,224	44.6
Total votes		11,707	100.0
Republican gain from Democratic			

=== District 17 ===
Iowa Senate, District 17 General Election, 1960
Party	Candidate	Votes	%
Republican	Harry L. Cowden	12,262	52.6
Democratic	Robert C. Dailey	11,035	47.4
Total votes		23,297	100.0
Republican hold			

=== District 19 ===
Iowa Senate, District 19 General Election, 1960
Party	Candidate	Votes	%
Republican	Richard C. Turner	17,913	55.6
Democratic	Gilbert C. Klefstad	14,301	44.4
Total votes		32,214	100.0
Republican hold			

=== District 23 ===
Iowa Senate, District 23 General Election, 1960
Party	Candidate	Votes	%
Republican	Earl Elijah (incumbent)	13,877	54.5
Democratic	Richard C. Benischek	11,571	45.5
Total votes		25,448	100.0
Republican hold			

=== District 24 ===
Iowa Senate, District 24 General Election, 1960
Party	Candidate	Votes	%
Republican	J. T. Dykhouse (incumbent)	17,503	100.0
Total votes		17,503	100.0
Republican hold			

=== District 25 ===
Iowa Senate, District 25 General Election, 1960
Party	Candidate	Votes	%
Republican	D. C. Nolan (incumbent)	15,071	54.4
Democratic	Carl J. Goetz, Jr.	12,613	45.6
Total votes		27,684	100.0
Republican hold			

=== District 26 ===
Iowa Senate, District 26 General Election, 1960
Party	Candidate	Votes	%
Republican	Martin Wiley	31,729	52.6
Democratic	Robert F. Wilson	28,606	47.4
Total votes		60,335	100.0
Republican hold			

=== District 27 ===
Iowa Senate, District 27 General Election, 1960
Party	Candidate	Votes	%
Democratic	C. Joseph Coleman (incumbent)	14,327	54.2
Republican	Forrest D. Bailey	12,098	45.8
Total votes		26,425	100.0
Democratic hold			

=== District 28 ===
Iowa Senate, District 28 General Election, 1960
Party	Candidate	Votes	%
Republican	Howard C. Buck (incumbent)	9,394	59.8
Democratic	Max M. Brewster	6,328	40.2
Total votes		15,722	100.0
Republican hold			

=== District 31 ===
Iowa Senate, District 31 General Election, 1960
Party	Candidate	Votes	%
Republican	Clifford Nystrom	17,556	57.1
Democratic	Eldon Dean Hastie	13,204	42.9
Total votes		30,760	100.0
Republican hold			

=== District 32 ===
Iowa Senate, District 32 General Election, 1960
Party	Candidate	Votes	%
Republican	Charles S. Van Eaton	24,055	51.4
Democratic	Donald V. Doyle	22,765	48.6
Total votes		46,820	100.0
Republican hold			

=== District 33 ===
Iowa Senate, District 33 General Election, 1960
Party	Candidate	Votes	%
Republican	Irving D. Long (incumbent)	9,577	56.1
Democratic	Edward B. Fitzpatrick	7,494	43.9
Total votes		17,071	100.0
Republican hold			

=== District 36 ===
Iowa Senate, District 36 General Election, 1960
Party	Candidate	Votes	%
Democratic	Adolph Elvers	5,483	51.4
Republican	F. E. Sharp	5,185	48.6
Total votes		10,668	100.0
Democratic hold			

=== District 39 ===
Iowa Senate, District 39 General Election, 1960
Party	Candidate	Votes	%
Republican	J. Kendall Lynes (incumbent)	14,859	65.5
Democratic	Chris Hansen	7,810	34.5
Total votes		22,669	100.0
Republican hold			

=== District 40 ===
Iowa Senate, District 40 General Election, 1960
Party	Candidate	Votes	%
Republican	George L. Scott (incumbent)	12,314	59.2
Democratic	Joseph F. Leehy	8,490	40.8
Total votes		20,804	100.0
Republican hold			

=== District 41 ===
Iowa Senate, District 41 General Election, 1960
Party	Candidate	Votes	%
Republican	Jacob Grimstead (incumbent)	9,666	55.8
Democratic	William H. Biedermann	7,657	44.2
Total votes		17,323	100.0
Republican hold			

=== District 43 ===
Iowa Senate, District 43 General Election, 1960
Party	Candidate	Votes	%
Republican	Leigh R. Curran	15,500	53.4
Democratic	Walter E. Edelen (incumbent)	13,513	46.6
Total votes		29,013	100.0
Republican gain from Democratic			

=== District 46 ===
Iowa Senate, District 46 General Election, 1960
Party	Candidate	Votes	%
Republican	J. Henry Lucken	14,182	62.4
Democratic	R. A. Boatman	8,539	37.6
Total votes		22,721	100.0
Republican hold			

=== District 47 ===
Iowa Senate, District 47 General Election, 1960
Party	Candidate	Votes	%
Republican	LeRoy Getting (incumbent)	12,640	57.5
Democratic	A. M. Schoenewe	9,348	42.5
Total votes		21,988	100.0
Republican hold			

=== District 49 ===
Iowa Senate, District 49 General Election, 1960
Party	Candidate	Votes	%
Democratic	John J. Brown	12,534	52.0
Republican	Max M. Soeth	11,547	48.0
Total votes		24,081	100.0
Democratic gain from Republican			

== See also ==
- United States elections, 1960
- United States House of Representatives elections in Iowa, 1960
- Elections in Iowa
