= 1956 Iowa Senate election =

- November 6, 1956

29 out of 50 seats in the Iowa State Senate 26 seats needed for a majority
	Majority party	Minority party
Leader	Duane E. Dewel	George E. O'Malley
Party	Republican	Democratic
Leader's seat	49th	30th
Last election	44	6
Seats after	40	10
Seat change	▼4	▲4
Majority Leader before election
Duane E. Dewel
Republican
Elected Majority Leader
D. C. Nolan
Republican

The 1956 Iowa State Senate elections took place as part of the biennial 1956 United States elections. Iowa voters elected state senators in 29 of the state senate's 50 districts. State senators serve four-year terms in the Iowa State Senate.

A statewide map of the 50 state Senate districts in the year 1956 is provided by the Iowa General Assembly here.

The primary election on June 4, 1956, determined which candidates appeared on the November 6, 1956 general election ballot.

Following the previous election, Republicans had control of the Iowa state Senate with 44 seats to Democrats' 6 seats.

To claim control of the chamber from Republicans, the Democrats needed to net 20 Senate seats.

Republicans maintained control of the Iowa State Senate following the 1956 general election with the balance of power shifting to Republicans holding 40 seats and Democrats having 10 seats (a net gain of 4 seats for Democrats).

== Summary of Results ==
- Note: The 21 holdover Senators not up for re-election are not listed on this table.

State Senate District	Incumbent	Party	Elected Senator	Party
2nd	Charles W. Nelson	Rep	Norval Evans	Rep
3rd	Ted D. Clark	Rep	Gene L. Hoffman	Dem
4th	William C. Stuart	Rep	William C. Stuart	Rep
5th	Xavier Thomas Prentis	Rep	Xavier Thomas Prentis	Rep
6th	Thomas C. Larson	Rep	Francis Austin Turner	Rep
8th	Henry W. Washburn	Rep	William H. Harbor	Rep
11th	George Donald Bellman	Rep	J. Louis Fisher	Rep
14th	Charles Emory Stewart	Rep	Carroll F. McCurdy	Dem
15th	Leon N. Miller	Dem	Carroll Price	Rep
16th	Lorin B. Sayre	Rep	Raymond R. Gillespie	Dem
17th	Glenn Edwin Whitehead	Rep	Gerald William Prince	Rep
19th	De Vere Watson	Rep	Jim O. Henry	Rep
23rd	David Earl Elijah	Rep	David Earl Elijah	Rep
24th	Jans T. "J. T." Dykhouse	Rep	Jans T. "J. T." Dykhouse	Rep
25th	Daniel Clifford "D. C." Nolan	Rep	Daniel Clifford "D. C." Nolan	Rep
26th	Frank C. Byers	Rep	Frank C. Byers	Rep
27th	Henry Emil Heideman	Rep	C. Joseph Coleman	Dem
28th	Warren Eldon Walter	Rep	Howard C. Buck	Rep
31st	Janious G. Lucas	Rep	Carl H. Ringgenberg	Rep
32nd	Charles S. Van Eaton	Rep	Jack Richard Miller	Rep
33rd	Donald Alexander Risk	Rep	Irving D. Long	Rep
36th	Art J. Johnson	Rep	John J. O'Connor	Dem
39th	J. Kendall Lynes	Rep	J. Kendall Lynes	Rep
40th	George Lindsey Scott	Rep	George Lindsey Scott	Rep
41st	Jacob Grimstead	Rep	Jacob Grimstead	Rep
43rd	Herman M. Knudson	Rep	William H. Tate	Rep
46th	Laurence M. Boothby	Rep	Laurence M. Boothby	Rep
47th	Harry E. Watson	Rep	Harry E. Watson	Rep
49th	Duane E. Dewel	Rep	Duane E. Dewel	Rep

== Detailed Results ==
- NOTE: The 21 districts that did not hold elections in 1956 are not listed here.
- Note: The Iowa Secretary of State's website does not document any competitive intra-party primaries for state Senate races in 1956.

=== District 2 ===
Iowa Senate, District 2 General Election, 1956
Party	Candidate	Votes	%
Republican	Norval Evans	7,359	62.5
Democratic	Joseph A. Frakes	4,424	37.5
Total votes		11,783	100.0
Republican hold			

=== District 3 ===
Iowa Senate, District 3 General Election, 1956
Party	Candidate	Votes	%
Democratic	Gene L. Hoffman	7,148	52.3
Republican	Ted D. Clark (incumbent)	6,509	47.7
Total votes		13,657	100.0
Democratic gain from Republican			

=== District 4 ===
Iowa Senate, District 4 General Election, 1956
Party	Candidate	Votes	%
Republican	W. C. Stuart (incumbent)	6,341	56.0
Democratic	Catherine A. Murray	4,974	44.0
Total votes		11,315	100.0
Republican hold			

=== District 5 ===
Iowa Senate, District 5 General Election, 1956
Party	Candidate	Votes	%
Republican	X. T. Prentis (incumbent)	8,900	52.7
Democratic	William L. Hawks	7,982	47.3
Total votes		16,882	100.0
Republican hold			

=== District 6 ===
Iowa Senate, District 6 General Election, 1956
Party	Candidate	Votes	%
Republican	Francis A. Turner	5,002	52.2
Democratic	Leonard Morris	4,580	47.8
Total votes		9,582	100.0
Republican hold			

=== District 8 ===
Iowa Senate, District 8 General Election, 1956
Party	Candidate	Votes	%
Republican	William H. Harbor	8,124	65.4
Democratic	Bonnie E. Boll	4,298	34.6
Total votes		12,422	100.0
Republican hold			

=== District 11 ===
Iowa Senate, District 11 General Election, 1956
Party	Candidate	Votes	%
Republican	J. Louis Fisher	6,806	52.7
Democratic	Earl Godwin	6,111	47.3
Total votes		12,917	100.0
Republican hold			

=== District 14 ===
Iowa Senate, District 14 General Election, 1956
Party	Candidate	Votes	%
Democratic	Carroll F. McCurdy	5,504	54.4
Republican	Royd McCurdy	4,609	45.6
Total votes		10,113	100.0
Democratic gain from Republican			

=== District 15 ===
Iowa Senate, District 15 General Election, 1956
Party	Candidate	Votes	%
Republican	Carroll Price	8,625	51.3
Democratic	Albert DeGeus	8,178	48.7
Total votes		16,803	100.0
Republican gain from Democratic			

=== District 16 ===
Iowa Senate, District 16 General Election, 1956
Party	Candidate	Votes	%
Democratic	Raymond R. Gillespie	6,048	51.3
Republican	Fay L. Harris	5,736	48.7
Total votes		11,784	100.0
Democratic gain from Republican			

=== District 17 ===
Iowa Senate, District 17 General Election, 1956
Party	Candidate	Votes	%
Republican	G. W. Prince	12,093	50.6
Democratic	E. Paul Wilson	11,800	49.4
Total votes		23,893	100.0
Republican hold			

=== District 19 ===
Iowa Senate, District 19 General Election, 1956
Party	Candidate	Votes	%
Republican	Jim O. Henry	16,664	56.7
Democratic	Ethel M. T. Johnson	12,742	43.3
Total votes		29,406	100.0
Republican hold			

=== District 23 ===
Iowa Senate, District 23 General Election, 1956
Party	Candidate	Votes	%
Republican	Earl Elijah (incumbent)	13,198	55.2
Democratic	Richard Benischek	10,733	44.8
Total votes		23,931	100.0
Republican hold			

=== District 24 ===
Iowa Senate, District 24 General Election, 1956
Party	Candidate	Votes	%
Republican	J. T. Dykhouse (incumbent)	14,754	69.1
Democratic	Don Truckenmiller	6,600	30.9
Total votes		21,354	100.0
Republican hold			

=== District 25 ===
Iowa Senate, District 25 General Election, 1956
Party	Candidate	Votes	%
Republican	D. C. Nolan (incumbent)	13,988	53.8
Democratic	Jack C. White	12,008	46.2
Total votes		25,996	100.0
Republican hold			

=== District 26 ===
Iowa Senate, District 26 General Election, 1956
Party	Candidate	Votes	%
Republican	Frank C. Byers (incumbent)	28,073	53.0
Democratic	Loren M. Hullinger, Jr.	24,861	47.0
Total votes		52,934	100.0
Republican hold			

=== District 27 ===
Iowa Senate, District 27 General Election, 1956
Party	Candidate	Votes	%
Democratic	Joe Coleman	14,197	55.0
Republican	Henry E. Heideman (incumbent)	11,613	45.0
Total votes		25,810	100.0
Democratic gain from Republican			

=== District 28 ===
Iowa Senate, District 28 General Election, 1956
Party	Candidate	Votes	%
Republican	Howard C. Buck	10,145	100.0
Total votes		10,145	100.0
Republican hold			

=== District 31 ===
Iowa Senate, District 31 General Election, 1956
Party	Candidate	Votes	%
Republican	Carl H. Ringgenberg	16,258	55.9
Democratic	Charles F. Barr	12,815	44.1
Total votes		29,073	100.0
Republican hold			

=== District 32 ===
Iowa Senate, District 32 General Election, 1956
Party	Candidate	Votes	%
Republican	Jack Miller	24,176	55.2
Democratic	Emlin L. Bergeson	19,612	44.8
Total votes		43,788	100.0
Republican hold			

=== District 33 ===
Iowa Senate, District 33 General Election, 1956
Party	Candidate	Votes	%
Republican	Irving D. Long	9,500	58.3
Democratic	John Q. Swift	6,784	41.7
Total votes		16,284	100.0
Republican hold			

=== District 36 ===
Iowa Senate, District 36 General Election, 1956
Party	Candidate	Votes	%
Democratic	John J. O'Connor	5,593	53.3
Republican	A. J. Johnson (incumbent)	4,891	46.7
Total votes		10,484	100.0
Democratic gain from Republican			

=== District 39 ===
Iowa Senate, District 39 General Election, 1956
Party	Candidate	Votes	%
Republican	J. Kendall Lynes (incumbent)	13,866	63.9
Democratic	Joe Roose	7,838	36.1
Total votes		21,704	100.0
Republican hold			

=== District 40 ===
Iowa Senate, District 40 General Election, 1956
Party	Candidate	Votes	%
Republican	George L. Scott (incumbent)	11,322	56.5
Democratic	Miles L. Connor	8,705	43.5
Total votes		20,027	100.0
Republican hold			

=== District 41 ===
Iowa Senate, District 41 General Election, 1956
Party	Candidate	Votes	%
Republican	Jacob Grimstead (incumbent)	9,479	56.1
Democratic	William H. Biedermann	7,432	43.9
Total votes		16,911	100.0
Republican hold			

=== District 43 ===
Iowa Senate, District 43 General Election, 1956
Party	Candidate	Votes	%
Republican	W. H. Tate	14,157	51.3
Democratic	William McArthur	13,444	48.7
Total votes		27,601	100.0
Republican hold			

=== District 46 ===
Iowa Senate, District 46 General Election, 1956
Party	Candidate	Votes	%
Republican	Laurence M. Boothby (incumbent)	12,063	55.1
Democratic	Albert M. Wiltgen	9,828	44.9
Total votes		21,891	100.0
Republican hold			

=== District 47 ===
Iowa Senate, District 47 General Election, 1956
Party	Candidate	Votes	%
Republican	Harry E. Watson (incumbent)	11,453	55.6
Democratic	A. W. Noehren	9,152	44.4
Total votes		20,605	100.0
Republican hold			

=== District 49 ===
Iowa Senate, District 49 General Election, 1956
Party	Candidate	Votes	%
Republican	Duane E. Dewel (incumbent)	12,240	50.9
Democratic	Burl N. Ridout	11,804	49.1
Total votes		24,044	100.0
Republican hold			

== See also ==
- United States elections, 1956
- United States House of Representatives elections in Iowa, 1956
- Elections in Iowa
