= Senator Turner =

Senator Turner may refer to:

== Members of the Northern Irish Senate ==
- William George Turner (1872–1937), Northern Irish Senator from 1923 to 1929

== Members of the United States Senate ==
- George Turner (American politician) (1850–1932), U.S. Senator from Washington from 1897 to 1903
- James Turner (North Carolina politician) (1766–1824), U.S. Senator from North Carolina from 1805 to 1816

== United States state senate members ==
- Angela Turner-Ford (born 1971), Mississippi State Senate
- Bennie Turner (1948–2012), Mississippi State Senate
- Clarence W. Turner (1866–1939), Tennessee State Senate
- Dan W. Turner (1877–1969), Iowa State Senate
- Doris Turner (politician) (fl. 2020s), Illinois State Senate
- Harvey G. Turner (1822–1893), Wisconsin State Senate
- Henry E. Turner (New York politician) (1832–1911), New York State Senate
- Francis A. Turner (1900–1962), Iowa State Senate
- Henry E. Turner (New York politician) (1833–1911), New York State Senate
- James M. Turner (New Jersey politician) (1928–1981), New Jersey State Senate
- James Turner (Maryland politician) (1783–1861), Maryland State Senate
- Jim Turner (politician) (born 1946), Texas State Senate
- John F. Turner (born 1942), Wyoming State Senate
- Johnnie Turner (Kentucky politician) (1947–2024), Kentucky State Senate
- Johnny Ray Turner (born 1949), Kentucky State Senate
- Joseph Turner (Wisconsin politician) (died 1874), Wisconsin State Senate
- Josiah Turner (1821–1901), North Carolina State Senate
- Karl Turner (American politician) (1942–2025), Maine State Senate
- Loyce W. Turner (1927–2021), Georgia State Senate
- Nina Turner (born 1967), Ohio State Senate
- Oscar Turner (1825–1896), Kentucky State Senate
- Peter H. Turner (1813–1885), Wisconsin State Senate
- Richard C. Turner (1927–1986), Iowa State Senate
- Ross Turner (born 1964), South Carolina State Senate
- Sally Turner (fl. 2020s), Illinois State Senate
- Shirley Turner (born 1941), New Jersey State Senate
- Sparrel T. Turner (1846–1927), Virginia State Senate
- Wilfred D. Turner (1855–1933), North Carolina State Senate
- William H. Turner (politician) (1931–2002), Florida State Senate

== See also ==
- Senator Turney (disambiguation)
