= Charles Atkins =

Charles Atkins may refer to:

- Charles Atkins (American politician) (1831–1898), American politician
- Charles Atkins (Australian politician) (1885–1960), Australian politician
- Charles Atkins was a 15-year-old boy lynched on May 18, 1922
- Speedy Atkins (Charles Henry Atkins, 1875–1928), American tobacco worker displayed as a mummy
- Cholly Atkins (Charles Atkins, 1913–2003), American dancer and vaudeville performer
