= Dague =

Dague is a surname. Notable people with the surname include:

- Bill Dague (1885–1963), American football player and coach
- Jean-Claude Dague (born 1937), French film director
- Paul B. Dague (1898–1974), American politician in Pennsylvania
- Robert Dague (1841–1918), American politician in Iowa
