= Senator Sampson =

Senator Sampson may refer to:

- Ezekiel S. Sampson (1831–1896), Iowa State Senate
- John L. Sampson (born 1965), New York State Senate
