= Senator Fellows =

Senator Fellows may refer to:

- Albert Fellows (1864–1932), Iowa State Senate
- John R. Fellows (1832–1896), Arkansas state Senate
- Liberty Fellows (1834–1912), Iowa State Senate
