= Iowa's 11th House of Representatives district =

American legislative district

House District 11
- Type: District of the Lower house
- Location: Iowa
- Representative: Craig Williams
- Parent organization: Iowa General Assembly

The 11th District of the Iowa House of Representatives in the state of Iowa. It is currently composed of Carroll and Audubon Counties, as well as part of Shelby and Pottawattamie Counties.

== Current elected officials ==
Craig Williams is the representative currently representing the district.

== Past representatives ==
The district has previously been represented by:

- Michael K. Kennedy, 1971–1973
- Alvin V. Miller, 1973–1977
- Betty Jean Clark, 1977–1983
- Daniel P. Fogarty, 1983–1993
- James A. Meyer, 1993–1999
- Steve Kettering, 1999–2003
- Henry Rayhons, 2003–2013
- Gary Worthan, 2013–2023
- Brian Best, 2023–2025
- Craig Williams, 2025–Present
