= Alvin Miller =

Alvin Miller may refer to:

- Alvin V. Miller (1921–1993), state legislator in Iowa, US
- Alvin Miller, fictional character in The Tales of Alvin Maker
