= Craig Williams (Iowa politician) =

American politician

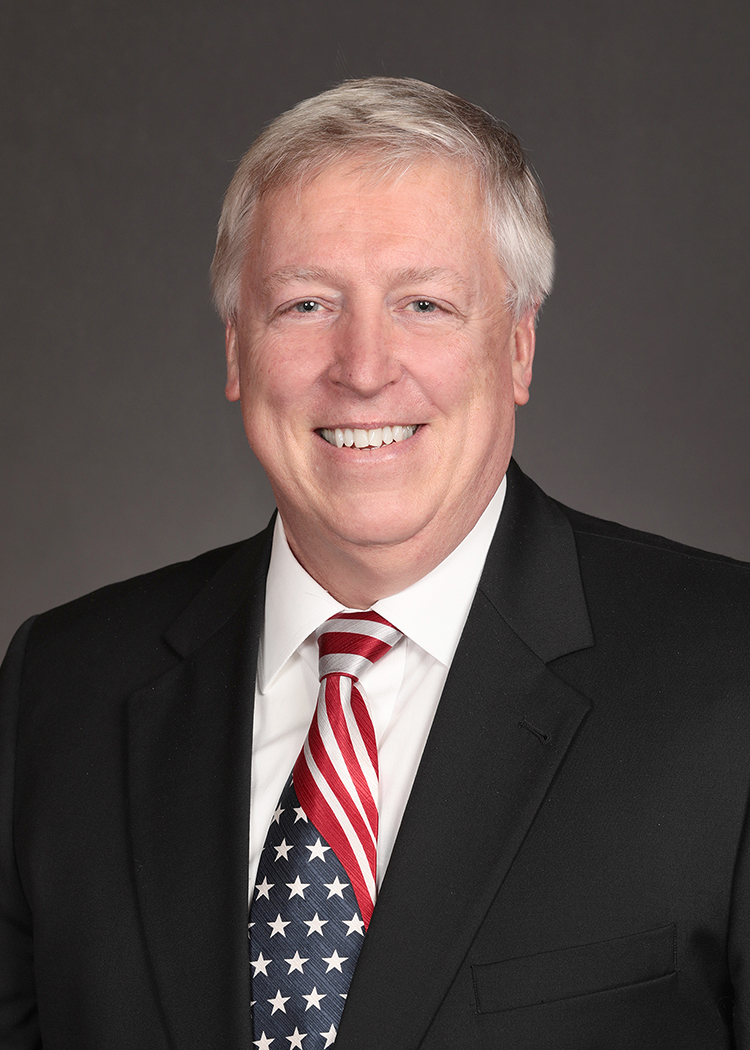

Member of the Iowa House of Representatives from the 11th district
- Incumbent
- Assumed office January 13, 2025
- Preceded by: Brian Best

Member of the Iowa Senate from the 6th district
- In office January 11, 2021 – January 9, 2023
- Preceded by: Mark Segebart
- Succeeded by: Jason Schultz

Personal details
- Party: Republican
- Spouse: Cindy Williams (m. 1985)
- Children: 2
- Education: Bradley University (BS)

Craig Williams is an American politician serving as a member of the Iowa House of Representatives from the 11th district since 2025. He previously served in Iowa Senate representing the 6th district from 2021 to 2023.

== Early life and education ==
Williams is a native of Rockford, Illinois. He earned a Bachelor of Science degree in operations management and information systems from Bradley University in 1984. Williams learned assembly language as a college student.

== Career ==
=== Business ===
After graduating from college, Williams moved to Chicago and became a software developer for Arthur Andersen. After marrying his wife in 1985, Williams left Chicago and worked as a software developer for Thermos LLC. He later moved with his wife and two children to Manning, Iowa, where he worked in the IT department of Garst Seed Company. He also worked as an accountant for the company before joining Midwest Seed Genetics in 1998. In 2001, he became the director of operations for Channel Bio LLC. In 2004, he joined Stauffer Seed Company and later managed the sale of Renze Seed Company to Dow AgroSciences. Williams later left the seed industry and founded an independent consulting business.

=== Politics ===
In 2008, Williams was elected chair of the Carroll County Republican Central Committee. He later served as treasurer of the Republican Party of Iowa. Williams was elected to the Iowa Senate in November 2020 and assumed office on January 11, 2021. He served as vice chair of the Senate Government Oversight Committee.

Due to Iowa's redistricting, Williams opted not to run for re-election in 2022. In 2024, he ran for Iowa's 11th District House seat and was elected on November 5th, 2024. Williams was named Vice Chair to the Local Government Committee.

=== Committee assignments ===
- Local Government (vice chair)
- Environmental Protection
- Judiciary
- Transportation
- Agriculture and Natural Resources Appropriations Subcommittee
