= Betty Jean Clark =

American politician (1920–2005)

Member of the Iowa House of Representatives from the 29th district
- In office January 10, 1983 – January 13, 1991
- Preceded by: Hurley Hall
- Succeeded by: Scott L. Krebsbach

Member of the Iowa House of Representatives from the 11th district
- In office January 10, 1977 – January 9, 1983
- Preceded by: Alvin V. Miller
- Succeeded by: Daniel P. Fogarty

Personal details
- Born: April 18, 1920 Kansas City, Kansas, U.S.
- Died: April 10, 2005 (aged 84) Mason City, Iowa, U.S.
- Party: Republican
- Spouse: Homer O. Clark (m. 1950)
- Children: 3
- Education: Fort Hays State College; University of Utah; University of the Pacific
- Occupation: Politician

Betty Jean Clark (April 18, 1920 – April 10, 2005) was a state legislator in Iowa serving in the Iowa House of Representatives 1977–1990.

== Biography ==
Clark was born April 18, 1920 in Kansas City, Kansas to Reverend Raymond and Mary Walker. She was educated at school in Fort Hays then studied for her degree in religious education first in Fort Hays State College, then the University of Utah and finally at the University of the Pacific in Stockton.

She was a writer and editor for both churches and newspapers and in 1956 she wrote a book of meditation with her sister.

Clark stood for election to the Iowa House of Representatives to represent the 11th district in 1976 to take the seat being vacated by Alvin V. Miller, who was running for the state senate. She won the election and served from 1977 until 1991. During her service she was a member of many committees including many years on the Judiciary Committee and the Human Resources Committee, which she chaired for four years. Clark served her first three terms as a representative for District 11, then held the District 29 seat for her final four terms.

In 1990 she was badly injured in a car accident that left her in a wheelchair due to crushed vertebra.

Clark died April 10, 2005 in a Mason City hospital.
