= Senator Turney (disambiguation) =

Hopkins L. Turney (1797–1857) was a U.S. Senator from Tennessee from 1845 to 1851. Senator Turney may also refer to:

- Jacob Turney (1825–1891), Pennsylvania State Senate
- William Ward Turney (1861–1939), Texas State Senate

== See also ==
- Senator Turner (disambiguation)
