= Francis A. and Rose M. Turner House =

Historic house in Iowa, United States

- U.S. National Register of Historic Places
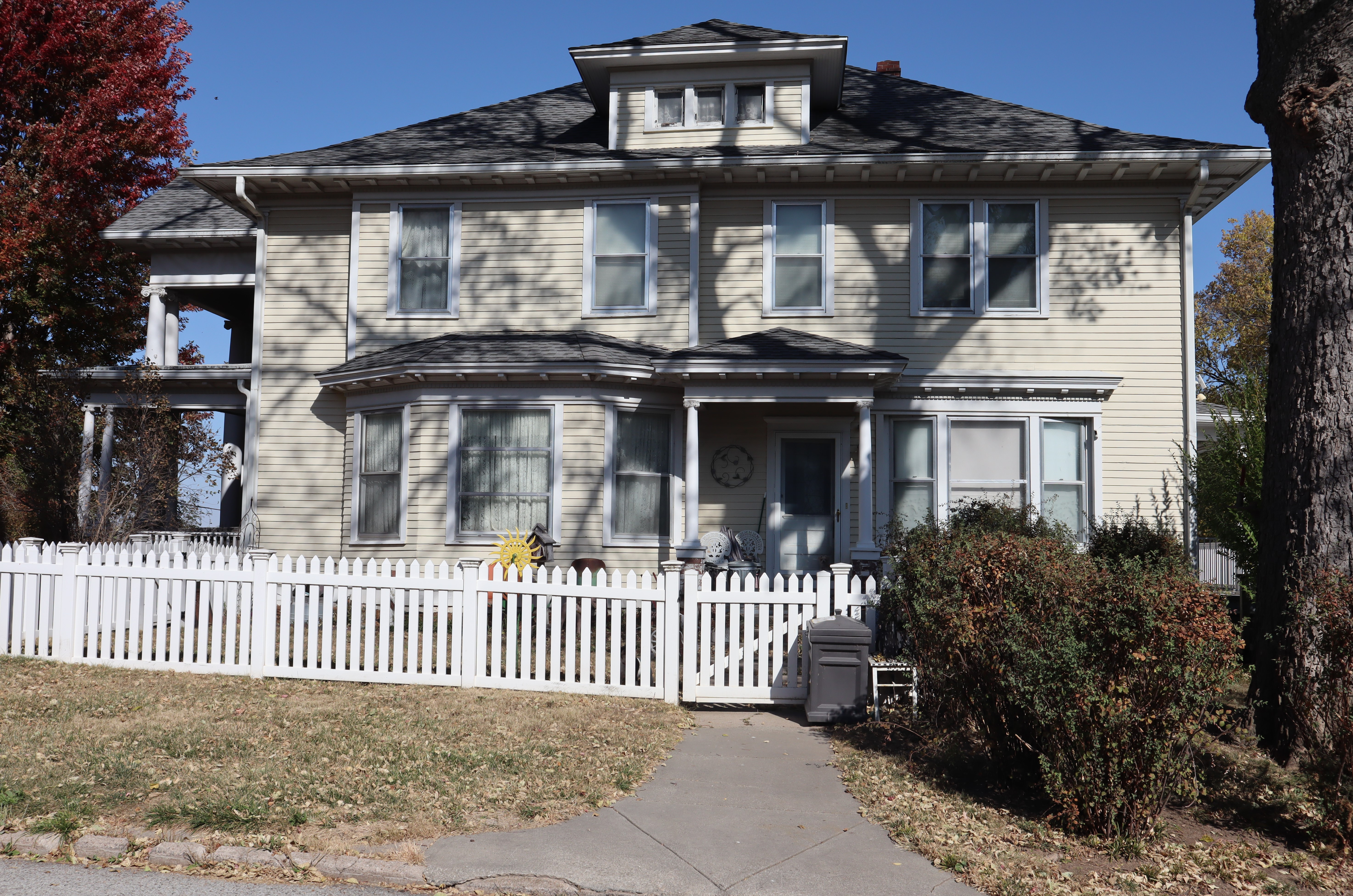

- Location within Iowa Location within the United States
- Location: 1004 Cherry St. Avoca, Iowa
- Coordinates: 41°29′0.2″N 95°20′04.8″W
- Area: less than one acre
- Built: 1905
- Built by: Fred Thiessen
- Architectural style: Classical Revival
- NRHP reference No.: 96001583
- Added to NRHP: January 31, 1997

The Francis A. and Rose M. Turner House is a historic building located in Avoca, Iowa, near U.S. Highway 59. Francis A. Turner was born in Des Moines County, Iowa, and the family moved to Pottawattamie County the following year where they farmed. After spending a period of time teaching, he studied law and settled in Avoca after passing the bar. Rose M. Woodward was a local school teacher. Their son, Joe, was mayor of Avoca from 1934-1950. Their grandson Richard, also an attorney, entered politics and became Attorney General of Iowa and the U.S. Attorney for the Southern District of Iowa.

This two-story frame Neoclassical house was built in 1905, probably by local builder Fred Thiessen. After Francis' death in 1935, the house passed to their son Joe and his wife Elizabeth. It was listed on the National Register of Historic Places in 1997.
