= James Addison Young =

American politician (1815–1875)

Member of the Iowa Senate from the 18th district
- In office January 8, 1872 – March 9, 1875
- Preceded by: John M. Cathcart
- Succeeded by: Thomas R. Gilmore

Personal details
- Born: January 21, 1815 Rockbridge County, Virginia, U.S.
- Died: March 9, 1875 (aged 60)
- Party: Republican
- Spouse(s): Elizabeth Hatfield (m. 1841; died 1846) Elizabeth McNeell (m. 1848)
- Occupation: Politician

James Addison Young (21 January 1815 – 9 March 1875) was an American politician.

Young was born on 21 January 1815 in Rockbridge County, Virginia, to a family of Scots-Irish descent. He was the seventh of eight siblings. Young worked on a farm as a child, and later learned to make saddles and harnesses from John A. Wolfley in Circleville, Ohio. Young moved through Ohio, Indiana, Illinois, and Kentucky, before settling in Oskaloosa, Iowa, in October 1849. Between 1850 and 1858, he ran a store.

Young supported the Whig Party until its dissolution, when he joined the Republican Party. Between 1861 and January 1872, Young served as Mahaska County treasurer. He won the District 18 seat in the Iowa Senate in the 1871 election and remained in office until his death on 9 March 1875.
