= Alvin V. Miller =

American politician (1921–1993)

Member of the Iowa Senate from the 10th district
- In office January 10, 1983 – January 10, 1993
- Preceded by: Robert Carr
- Succeeded by: Merlin Bartz

Member of the Iowa Senate from the 6th district
- In office January 10, 1977 – January 9, 1983
- Preceded by: Kenneth D. Scott
- Succeeded by: Lee Holt

Member of the Iowa House of Representatives from the 11th district
- In office January 8, 1973 – January 9, 1977
- Preceded by: Michael K. Kennedy
- Succeeded by: Betty Jean Clark

Personal details
- Born: February 2, 1921 Clear Lake, Iowa, U.S.
- Died: February 9, 1993 (aged 72)
- Party: Democratic
- Spouse: Frances Sorenson (m. 1943)
- Children: 3
- Education: Clear Lake High School
- Occupation: Politician, farmer

Alvin V. Miller (February 2, 1921 – February 9, 1993) was a state legislator in Iowa.

Miller was born in Clear Lake, Iowa, and graduated from Clear Lake High School in 1939. He farmed from 1940 to 1964, and later took over his father's insurance company. Miller was a Democrat. He served in the Iowa House of Representatives from 1973 to 1975 and in the Iowa Senate from 1977 to 1991.
