= 5th Iowa Infantry Regiment =

- Active: July 15, 1861, to August 8, 1864
- Country: United States
- Allegiance: Union
- Branch: Infantry
- Engagements: Battle of Island Number Ten; Siege of Corinth; Battle of Iuka; Battle of Port Gibson; Battle of Champion Hill; Siege of Vicksburg; Battle of Chattanooga; Battle of Lookout Mountain; Battle of Missionary Ridge

The 5th Iowa Infantry Regiment was an infantry regiment that served in the Union Army during the American Civil War.

== History ==
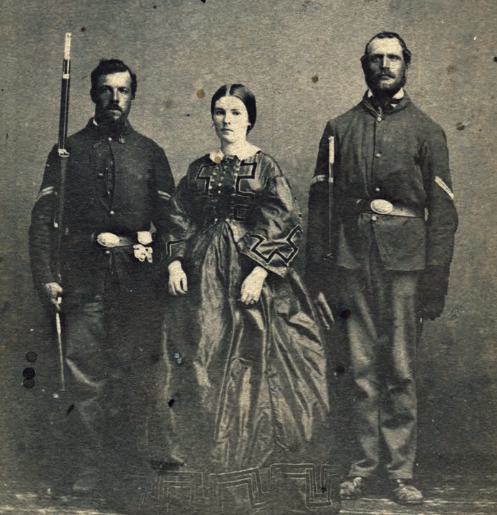
Emma Kline of Vicksburg, Mississippi, arrested for smuggling and guarded by soldiers of the 5th Iowa Infantry, 1864.

The ten companies that formed the 5th Iowa were ordered into quarters by Governor of Iowa Samuel Kirkwood at different dates between June 24 and July 3, 1861. The companies rendezvoused at Burlington, Iowa, where they mustered into Federal service between July 15 and July 17.

Before dawn on November 24, 1863, the regiment crossed the Tennessee River south of South Chickamauga Creek by pontoon boat along with its brigade. The 5th Iowa served with Matthies' Brigade at the Battle of Missionary Ridge on November 25. Advancing at the foot of the ridge, it was ordered by Matthies to occupy the Glass house and its surroundings to the west of Tunnel Hill on the northern end of the ridge. When the brigade advanced up the hill, the regiment deployed in a skirmish line on the right flank of the brigade. Struck from the left and rear by the countercharge of Granbury's Texas Brigade that routed the brigade, the regiment collapsed and precipitately retreated from the slopes of the hill under heavy fire. Stragglers from the 5th Iowa fled towards the Glass house, preventing the remnants of the 73rd Pennsylvania there from changing front against the Texans. At Missionary Ridge, the regiment suffered 106 casualties, including 82 captured, out of 248 officers and men present at the beginning of the battle. Among those captured was the entire color company, and with them, the regimental colors.

The regiment was amalgamated with the 5th Regiment Iowa Volunteer Cavalry on August 8, 1864.

A soldier from the Fifth Iowa Infantry is highlighted near the end of Chapter III of MacKinlay Kantor's Pulitzer Prize-winning novel "Andersonville" (1955). The soldier's story is more thoroughly described in Chapter IX of the same book.

== Total strength and casualties ==
Unit strength was 1067. The regiment suffered 9 officers and 108 enlisted men who were killed in action or who died of their wounds and 2 officers and 131 enlisted men who died of disease, for a total of 250 fatalities. 299 were wounded.

== Commanders ==
- Colonel William H. Worthington
- Colonel Charles L. Matthies
- Lieutenant Colonel Ezekiel S. Sampson
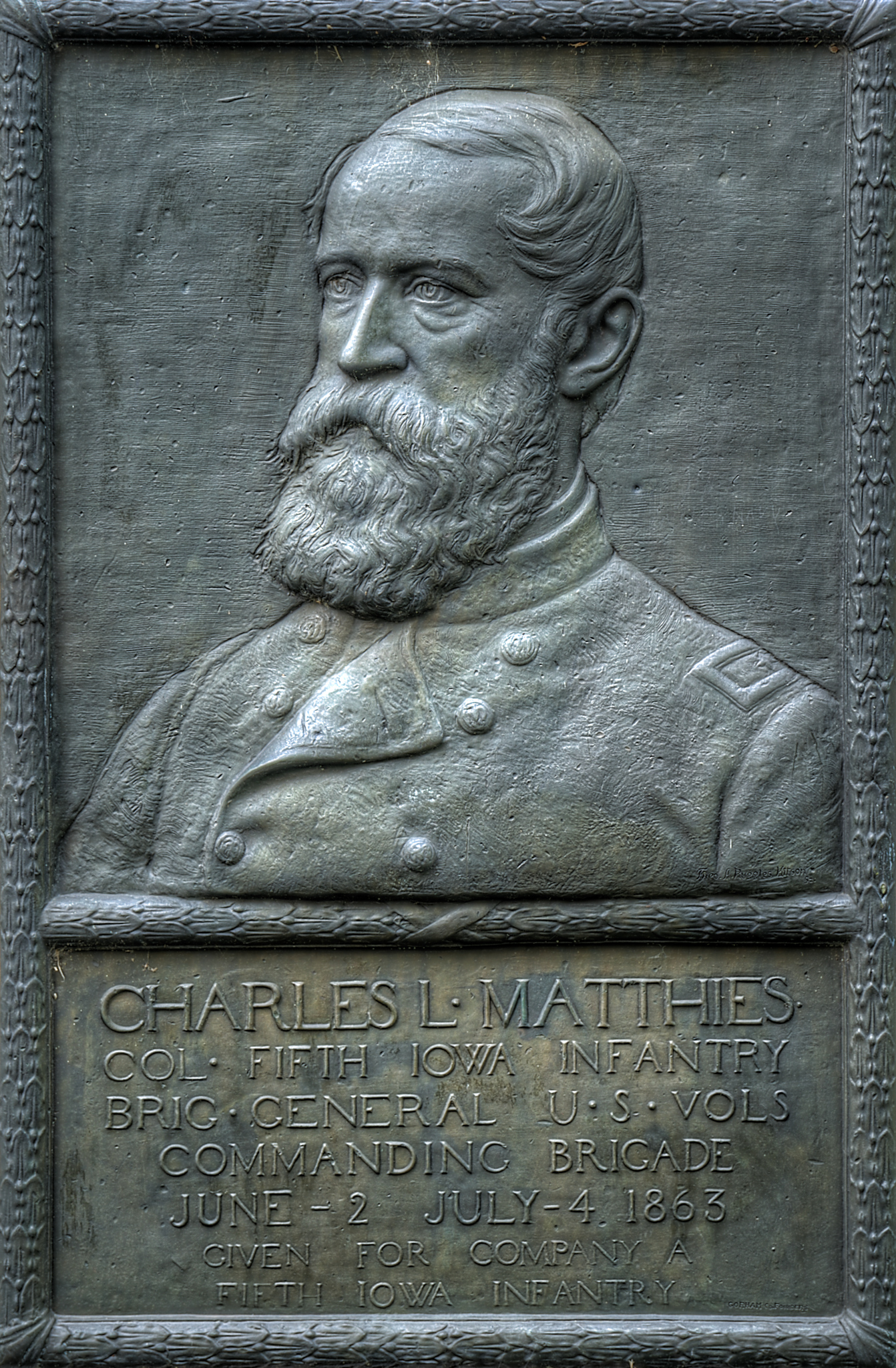
Bronze relief portrait of Charles L. Matthies at Vicksburg National Military Park

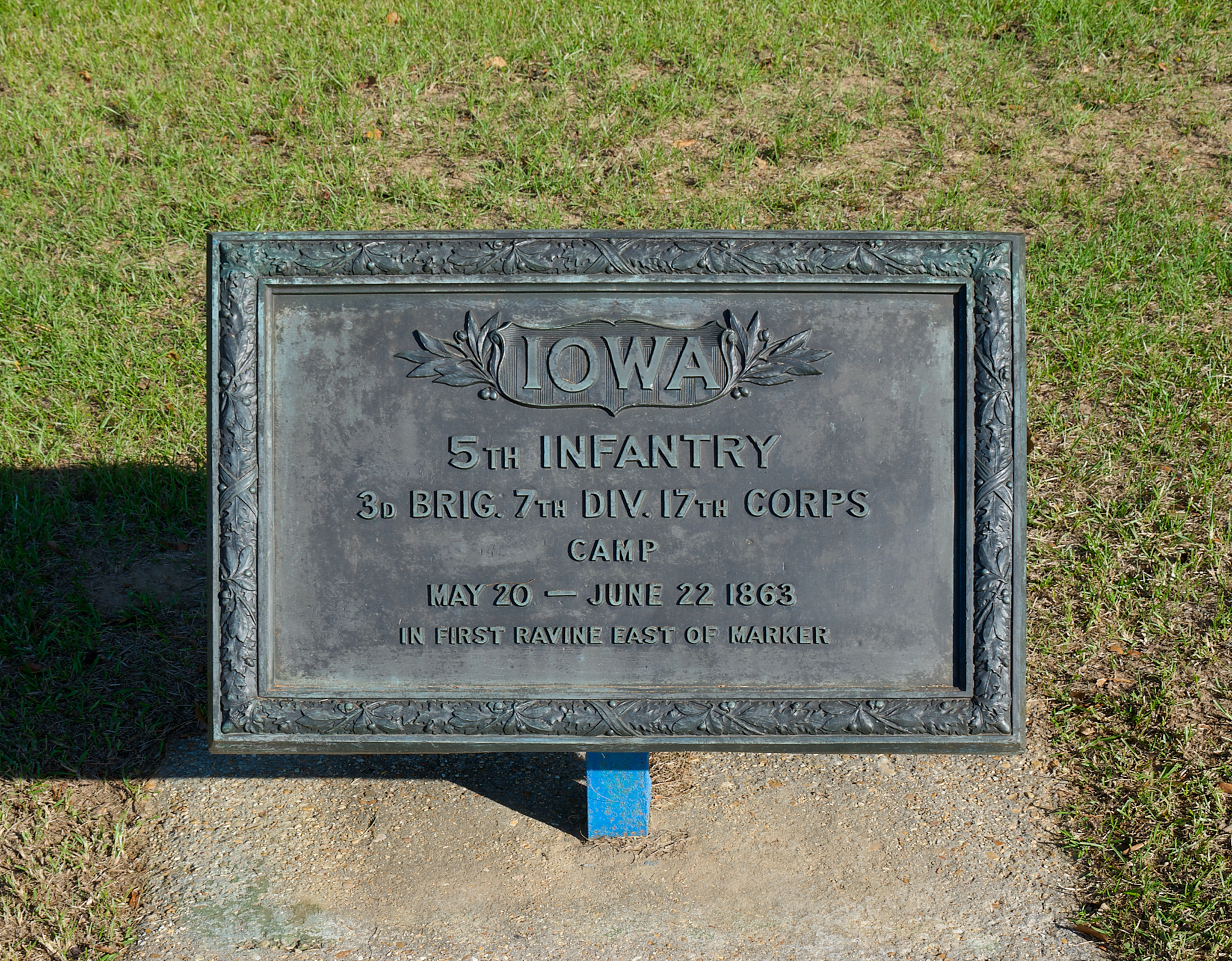
Unit position marker at Vicksburg National Military Park

== See also ==
- List of Iowa Civil War Units
- Iowa in the American Civil War
