= Charles Atkins (American politician) =

American politician

Charles Atkins (1831–1898) was an American politician.

Atkins was born in 1831, to shipbuilder James Atkins, in Hallowell, Maine. He moved to Iowa in 1856 and became a founding settler of the town of Onawa. Abraham Lincoln appointed Atkins postmaster of Onawa in 1861, and he was later elected to a second term. During his second term as postmaster, Atkins contested the 1869 Iowa Senate election as a Republican and secured the District 48 seat, which he held until 1874. Outside of politics, Atkins worked for the Union Pacific Railroad and the Chicago and North Western Transportation Company in a variety of roles. He died on 1 July 1898.
