= Thomas C. Larson =

American farmer and politician (1909–2007)

Thomas Clyde Larson (2 March 1909 – 5 May 2007) was an American politician.

Larson was born near Conway on 2 March 1909, to parents Lewis and Nora. He had two sisters and two brothers. Larson graduated from Conway High School in 1927 and earned an associate's degree in animal husbandry from Iowa State College, then operated his own farm in Taylor County, Iowa. Between 1948 and 1953, Larson served as a county supervisor. He was then elected to one four-year term on the Iowa Senate as a Republican legislator for District 6. Larson's tenure as a state senator overlapped with his stint on the county board of education.

Larson married his first wife, Althea King, in 1933. The couple had four children, and three of their biological daughters survived to adulthood. After King died in 1988, Larson remarried in 1992, to Irma Thummel, moved to Bedford, and retired from farming. He died on 5 May 2007, aged 98.
