= C. G. Bridges =

American politician

C. G. Bridges was an American politician.

He was elected to the Iowa Senate from 1864 to 1868, and practiced law in Decatur City. He left Iowa for Kansas after completing his single term as a Republican state senator representing District 6. Bridges then founded the Doniphan County Dispatch, which published its first issue on November 21, 1868. In 1875, Bridges and his wife sold land in Doniphan County to John F. Wilson.
