= Jim Henry (Iowa politician) =

American lawyer and politician (1896–1997)

James O. Henry

Member of the Iowa Senate from the 19th district
- In office January 14, 1957 – January 8, 1961
- Preceded by: De Vere Watson
- Succeeded by: Richard C. Turner

Member of the Iowa House of Representatives from the 31st district
- In office January 12, 1953 – January 13, 1957
- Preceded by: multi-member district
- Succeeded by: multi-member district

Personal details
- Born: October 28, 1896 near Macedonia, Iowa
- Died: July 1, 1997 (aged 100) Oakland, Iowa
- Party: Republican
- Occupation: farmer

James O. Henry (October 28, 1896 – July 1, 1997) was an American politician.

== Personal life ==
On October 28, 1896, Jim Henry was born on a farm in Silver Creek Township, Pottawattamie County, Iowa, near Macedonia, to parents Thomas W. and Charlotte Long Henry. He was educated at Lone Star country school, and while attending Macedonia High School, met Cecil Lorraine Pilling. Henry married Pilling on February 18, 1918, and the couple raised a son and daughter, while also caring for Pilling's three younger brothers.

Henry and his wife moved to the Oakland Manor nursing home in Oakland in November 1996. Henry died there on July 1, 1997, aged 100.

== Political career ==
Henry began farming in 1918, and was elected a Grove Township trustee two years later. During the Great Depression, Henry was active in the Farmers' Holiday Association and participated in a protest at the Iowa State Capitol, which numbered 36,000. A Republican, Henry served on the East Pottawattamie County Corn Hog Board from 1934 to 1938, when he was elected to the Pottawattamie County Board of Supervisors. During his tenure as a county supervisor, which lasted until 1953, he served as president of the board for eleven years. Between 1943 and 1945, Henry was president of the Iowa County Officers Association. He was a member of the Iowa Postwar Rehabilitation Commission from 1944 to 1945, and served on the Iowa Road Study Committee from 1947 to 1948.

Henry won his first state legislative election 1952, and assumed office as member of the Iowa House of Representatives for District 31 on January 12, 1953. He won a second term as a state representative in 1954, serving until January 13, 1957. In the 1956 Iowa Senate election, Henry was elected to the District 19 seat, replacing De Vere Watson on January 14, 1957. He served a single four-year term on the Iowa Senate, stepping down on January 8, 1961, and was succeeded by Richard C. Turner. In 1959, Henry was appointed to Iowa's Board of Control. He later served as president of the Iowa Property Taxpayers Association.
