= Michael Mulkern =

Irish-American politician

Michael B. Mulkern was an Irish-born American politician.

Mulkern was born in Ireland in 1829 and immigrated to the United States in 1853. He settled in Dubuque County, Iowa, and became a lawyer. He contested the 1869 Iowa Senate election, and won the District 35 seat as a Democratic Party candidate. Mulkern remained a member of the Iowa Senate until his death on 8 February 1871.
