= Jean-Claude Dague =

- Born: Jean-Claude Dagouassat; 1937 (age 88–89)
- Occupation: film director

Jean-Claude Dague, born Jean-Claude Dagouassat in 1937, is a French film director.

== Biography ==
After having directed four films, Jean-Claude Dague's production company was almost bankrupt. He then attempted a hold-up in Bry-sur-Marne in 1971, but was easily caught with his two partners, having used his own car to flee. The two partners were actor René Chapotot and stuntman Germain Roig. Dague then spent eight years in prison, and wrote about it in a book, Le Dénommé, of which he made a film in 1990.

== Filmography ==
Director

- 1968 : Le Bal des voyous
- 1969 : Poussez pas grand-père dans les cactus
- 1970 : Désirella
- 1971 : L'Homme qui vient de la nuit
- 1990 : Le Dénommé
- 1999 : La Paix pour les Enfants du Monde

Actor

- 1966 : Espions à l'affût

Screenwriter

- 1991 : La Dernière Saison
