= Elisha Howland =

American politician (1832–1905)

Elisha A. Howland (27 February 1832 – 20 January 1905) was an American politician.

Howland was born in Rutland, New York on 27 February 1832, and later moved to Iowa. He married Sarah L. Wyatt in Hamilton County, Iowa, on 8 December 1870. They settled in Morgan Township, Franklin County, Iowa, where Howland was a farmer. He was affiliated with the Republican Party and served on the township board of supervisors. Between 1872 and 1876, he was a member of the Iowa Senate, representing District 46, which included Franklin County. Howland died on 20 January 1905.
