= Marcus Tuttle =

American politician (1830–1884)

Marcus Tuttle (10 May 1830 – 8 January 1884) was an American politician.

Marcus Tuttle was the son of Ira Tuttle and Lucy Brockett, born on 10 May 1830 in Fairfield, New York. Tuttle attended school in Clinton, Oneida County, New York, where his family had relocated in 1842. Tuttle moved west with his brothers to Des Moines, Iowa, then aided the platting of Clear Lake, Iowa. He became a realtor, shopkeeper, and banker for the community. Tuttle was a Republican. He served one term as Cerro Gordo County judge, and was subsequently named an internal revenue assessor for Cerro Gordo and three neighboring counties. Tuttle resigned from the assessor post upon his election to the Iowa Senate in 1867. He represented District 39. Two years later, Tuttle was redistricted, and completed his term as a state senator representing District 46. In 1879, Tuttle moved to Spencer. He died of tuberculosis on 8 January 1884.
