= Michael K. Kennedy =

American politician

Member of the Iowa House of Representatives
- In office 1969–1973

Personal details
- Born: October 30, 1939 (age 86) New Hampton, Iowa, United States
- Party: Democratic
- Occupation: lawyer

Michael K. Kennedy (born October 30, 1939) was an American politician in the state of Iowa.

Kennedy was born in New Hampton, Iowa. He was a lawyer. He served in the Iowa House of Representatives from 1969 to 1973 as a Democrat.
