= Francis A. Turner =

American politician (1900–1962)

Francis Austin Turner (24 March 1900 – 12 January 1962) was an American politician.

== Early life and career ==
Francis Austin Turner was born in Corning, Iowa, on 24 March 1900, to parents Austin B. and Ella S. Turner. His uncle was Daniel W. Turner. Francis Turner attended school in his hometown, was later sent to The Kiski School, then returned to Iowa to enroll at Grinnell College. Upon graduating from Grinnell in 1921, Turner became an agricultural merchant and farm manager. He also worked at his father's business, Turner's Store in Corning.

== Public service and political career ==
Turner was a founding member of Corning's municipal utilities board, on which he served for twenty years. Additionally, he was a member of the Corning school board for eighteen years. Turner was elected to the Iowa Senate as a Republican in the 1956 election and served from 1957 to 1961 for District 6, a seat his uncle had once held.

== Personal life and death ==
Francis A. Turner married LaNor Holmes of Keota, Iowa, in 1924. The couple raised two children, Sarah and Austin III. While attending the 25 October 1958 football game between the Iowa Hawkeyes and the Northwestern Wildcats, Turner suffered a heart attack. His death, on 12 January 1962 at the Rosary Hospital in Corning, was attributed to a heart ailment.
