= Richard C. Turner =

American lawyer and politician

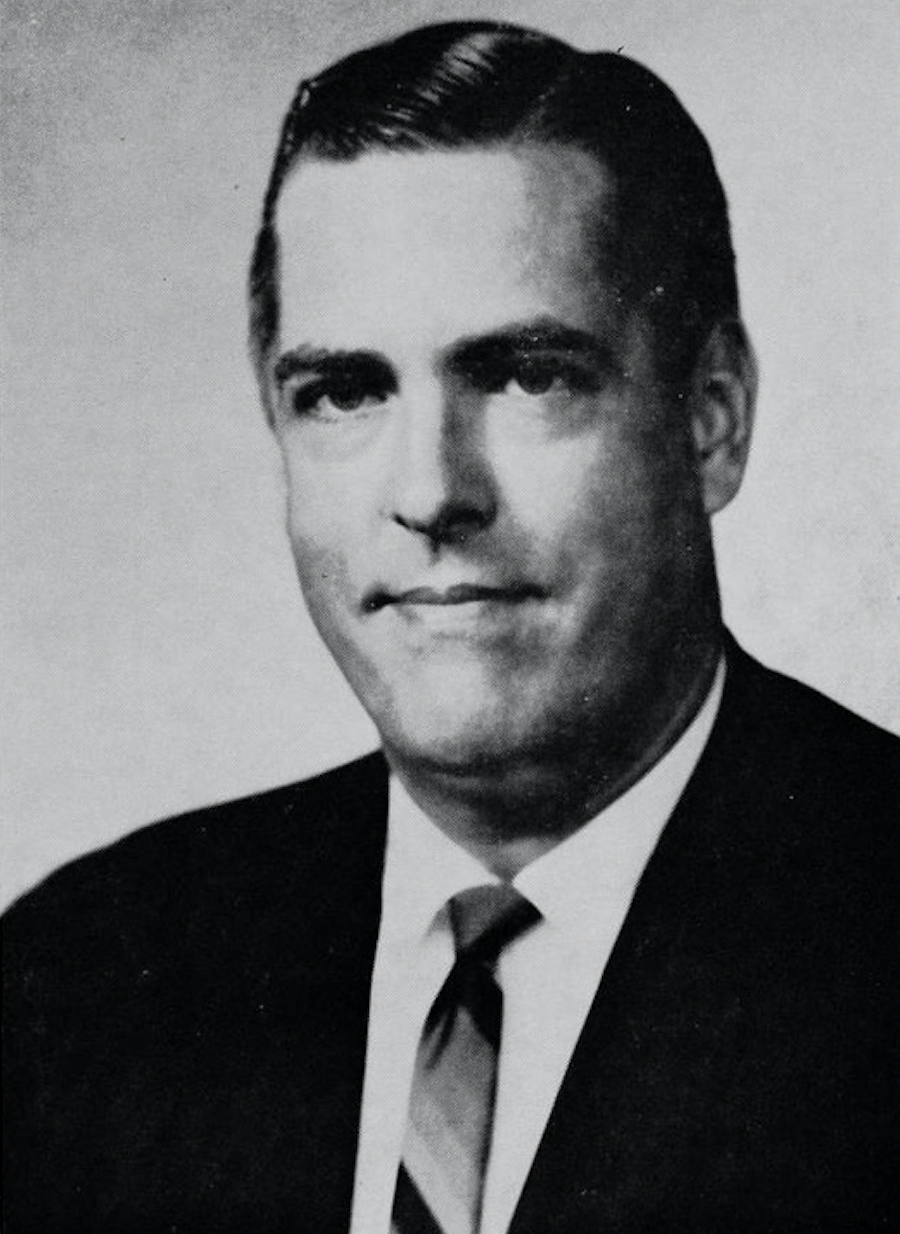

United States Attorney for the Southern District of Iowa
- In office March 5, 1982 – September 28, 1986
- President: Ronald Reagan
- Preceded by: Kermit B. Anderson
- Succeeded by: Christopher D. Hagen

29th Attorney General of Iowa
- In office January 1967 – January 12, 1979
- Governor: Harold Hughes; Robert D. Fulton; Robert D. Ray
- Preceded by: Lawrence F. Scalise
- Succeeded by: Tom Miller

Member of the Iowa Senate from the 19th district
- In office January 9, 1961 – January 11, 1965
- Preceded by: Jim O. Henry
- Succeeded by: Howard Tabor

Assistant County Attorney for Pottawattamie County
- In office March 11, 1954 – June 15, 1956

Avoca Town Clerk
- In office 1953–1960

Personal details
- Born: Richard Clark Turner; September 30, 1927 Avoca, Iowa, U.S.
- Died: September 28, 1986 (aged 58) West Des Moines, Iowa, U.S.
- Party: Republican
- Spouse: Charlotte Forsen (m. 1957)
- Children: 3
- Education: University of Iowa (BA) (JD)

Military service
- Allegiance: United States
- Branch/service: United States Army
- Years of service: 1945–1947
- Unit: Army Air Forces

Richard Clark Turner (September 30, 1927 – September 28, 1986) was the Iowa Attorney General from 1968 to 1979.

== Early life ==
Turner was born in Avoca, Iowa to Joe W. and Betty Turner. His father served as Mayor of Avoca from 1938 to 1950 and from 1952 to 1956.

He graduated from Avoca High School in 1945. He then served in the United States Army Air Forces from 1945 to 1947. In 1950, he graduated from University of Iowa and then received his Juris Doctor degree from University of Iowa College of Law in February 1953. He joined Turner and Turner law firm in Avoca, with his father to practice law. This is the law firm which was founded by his grandfather Francis Albert Turner.

== Political career ==
=== Early career ===
He served as Assistant County Attorney for Pottawattamie County from March 11, 1954 until June 15, 1956.

He served as town clerk for Avoca from 1953 to 1960. He then practiced law in Council Bluffs, Iowa.

=== Iowa State Senate ===
From 1961 to 1965, Turner served in the Iowa State Senate and was a Republican. He took his seat on January 9, 1961.

In 1960, he beat Gilbert E. Klefstad, with Turner winning 17,913 votes compared to Klefstad's 14,031 votes.

In 1964, he lost to Gilbert E. Klefstad, with Turner winning 14,625 votes compared to Klefstad's 16,093 votes.

He left the Senate on January 11, 1965.

=== Iowa Attorney General ===
Turner then served as Iowa Attorney General from 1967 to 1979.

In 1966, Turner ran for Attorney General of Iowa. On September 6, 1966, he ran in the primary election against Virgil Moore and Joseph G. Bertroche. He won with 72,591 votes compared to Moore's 37,712 votes and Bertroche's 37,699 votes. In the November general election, he ran against incumbent Democrat Lawrence F. Scalise and National Prohibition candidate George A. Murray. Turner won with 428,209 votes compared to Scalise's 417,317 votes and Murray's 3,392 votes.

In 1970, he ran against Democrat Ray Walton and won with 405,474 votes compared to Walton's 341,451 votes.

In 1972, he ran against Democrat James B. Reynolds and won with 623,007 votes compared to 522,324 votes.

In 1974, he ran against Democrat Tom Miller and won with 439,643 votes compared to Miller's 405,792 votes.

In 1978, he ran against Democrat Tom Miller and Socialist Steve Wilson, and lost with 351,251 votes compared to Miller's 442,895 votes and Wilson's 2,519 votes.

=== United States Attorney ===
Turner then returned to practice law.

On June 11, 1981, Turner was nominated by a group of Iowa congressmen to be the US Attorney for the Southern District of Iowa. On November 11, 1981, his appointment was sent to the US Senate for confirmation. On December 17, 1981, his nomination was confirmed by the Senate. On March 5, 1982, he was sworn in. He served until September 28, 1986, when he died in office.

== Personal life ==
He married Charlotte Forsen on November 30, 1957 in Council Bluffs at the St John's Lutheran Church. They had two sons and daughter. They attended Presbyterian Church.

He had his first heart attack in 1973 and in 1983 he was given five bypasses to help his heart.

Turner woke up and collapsed at home around 3 am and by 4 am was pronounced dead at Mercy Hospital in Des Moines, Iowa. He died of a heart attack 2 days before his 59th birthday. Charlotte died on February 25, 2023 in Urbandale, Iowa, aged 94.

The house where he was raised in Avoca is listed on the National Register of Historic Places as the Francis A. and Rose M. Turner House. Francis and Rose were his paternal grandparents.

Party political offices
Preceded by Wilbur N. Bump	Republican nominee for Attorney General of Iowa; 1966, 1968, 1970, 1972, 1974, 1978	Succeeded by Walter Conlon
