= John C. Johnson =

American politician (1815–1892)

John C. Johnson (3 February 1815 – 25 February 1892) was an American politician.

John C. Johnson was a native of Randolph County, North Carolina, born on 3 February 1815. Aged fifteen, he and his family moved to Hendricks County, Indiana, where he was educated. On 8 August 1839, Johnson married Prudence Sanders. They moved to Keokuk County, Iowa, in 1846, where they farmed. Johnson held several township offices before serving three terms as Keokuk County supervisor. He succeeded fellow Republican Ezekiel S. Sampson to the Iowa Senate in 1868, after Sampson had been elected sixth district court judge. After completing Sampson's term in January 1870, Johnson vacated the District 17 seat. He died on 25 February 1892.
