= Charles L. Matthies =

Union Army general (1824–1868)

Charles Leopold Matthies
- Born: May 31, 1824; Bromberg, Prussia
- Died: October 16, 1868 (aged 44); Burlington, Iowa, U.S.
- Burial place: Aspen Grove Cemetery; Burlington, Iowa, U.S.
- Military career
- Allegiance: Prussia; United States; Union
- Branch: Prussian Army; US Army; Union Army
- Service years: 1848-1849; 1861-1864
- Rank: Brigadier General
- Commands: 1st Iowa Volunteer Infantry; 5th Iowa Volunteer Infantry
- Conflicts: American Civil War; Battle of Island Number Ten; Battle of Iuka; Battle of Corinth; Battle of Jackson; Siege of Vicksburg; Battle of Missionary Ridge

Charles Leopold Matthies (or Karl Leopold Matthies) (31 May 1824 – 16 October 1868) was a Prussian soldier, revolutionary and Union Army officer during the American Civil War, rising to the rank of brigadier general.

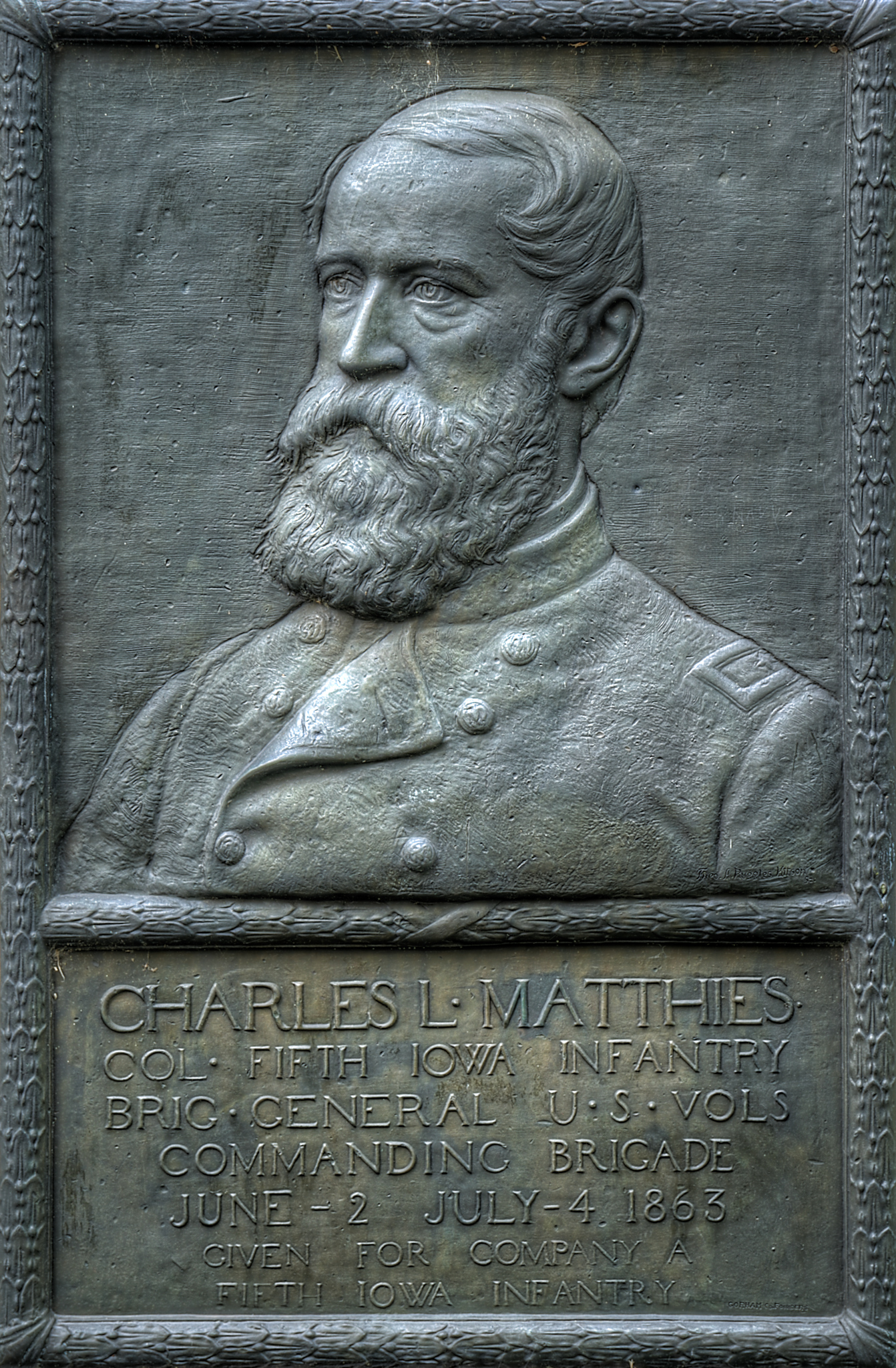
Relief portrait by Theo Alice Ruggles Kitson at Vicksburg National Military Park

== Biography ==
Matthies was born in Bromberg, Prussia (later Bydgoszcz, Poland) and worked as a farmer early in life. He served in the Prussian Army during the Revolutions of 1848 in the German states. Matthies emigrated to the United States in 1849 and settled in Iowa where he became a successful liquor merchant.

Once the Civil War began, Matthies immediately volunteered for the Union Army. On May 14, 1861, he became a captain in the 1st Iowa Volunteer Infantry. Soon after on July 23, 1861, he was appointed lieutenant colonel of the 5th Iowa Volunteer Infantry. Matthies first saw action at the Battle of Island Number Ten. He was appointed colonel on May 23, 1862, and fought at the battles of Iuka and Corinth. During the winter of 1862-1863 he was in command of a brigade in the Army of the Tennessee.

On April 4, 1864, he was promoted to brigadier general of U.S. Volunteers, to rank from November 29, 1862. He was placed in command of the 3rd Brigade, 3rd Division in William T. Sherman’s XV Corps. Matthies led this brigade during the Vicksburg Campaign, fighting at the Battle of Jackson and in the assaults on Vicksburg. During the following siege, Matthies’ brigade was transferred to the 7th Division of the XVII Corps.

In September 1863 Matthies’ brigade became the 3rd Brigade, 2nd Division, XVII Corps and was sent to the aid of the besieged Union forces at Chattanooga. During the battle of Missionary Ridge, he participated in Sherman’s attack against the Patrick Cleburne’s division near Tunnel Hill. During the attack Matthies was wounded in the head and had to relinquish field command. His head injury prevented him from returning to command until March 1864 when he resumed command of his brigade, now the 3rd Brigade, 3rd Division, XV Corps. He held this command only briefly as his injury forced him to resign from the army on May 16, 1864.

He returned to Iowa where he was elected to the Iowa Senate, representing District 10 as a Republican.

He died shortly after the end of the war on October 16, 1868, in Burlington, Iowa. He is buried at Aspen Grove Cemetery in Burlington.

== See also ==
- List of American Civil War generals (Union)
