= Emmons Johnson =

American politician (1835–1927)

Emmons Johnson (23 January 1835 – 5 April 1927) was an American politician.

Johnson was born in Ellicottville, New York on 23 January 1835. He was educated near his hometown, and later attended schools in Springville and Fredonia, New York. Johnson then enrolled at Brown University for a single semester. He moved steadily westward, living in Evanston, Illinois during his tenure on the Chicago Board of Trade. In 1860, Johnson moved to Iowa. He built the first grain elevator in the town of Independence, then moved to Waterloo that July, where he and C. A. Farwell built that city's first grain elevator. Johnson founded the first bank in Waverly in 1864, and divested by 1870 to start a private banking partnership in Waterloo with Leavitt, Johnson & Lusch. The firm was renamed twice, to Leavitt & Johnson in 1876 and The Leavitt & Johnson National Bank in 1898. Three years later, Johnson founded The Leavitt & Johnson Trust Company to specialize in farm loans. By 1902, Johnson had established the Waterloo Savings Bank, and reinvested in financial infrastructure in Waverly the next year, obtaining capital stock in the First National Bank of Waverly.

Johnson first married Lucy Leland, a native of Morrisville, New York, in October 1859. They raised six children together, before Leland died in February 1892. Johnson subsequently married Ella H. C. Kellogg, of Rochester, New York, in March 1895. Johnson was a Republican, Congregationalist, and Freemason. While a resident of Waverly, he began serving on the Iowa Senate for District 44 in March 1870, and resigned the position in 1871, upon deciding to return to Waterloo. Johnson died on 5 April 1927.
