= Ezekiel S. Sampson =

American politician

Ezekiel Silas Sampson
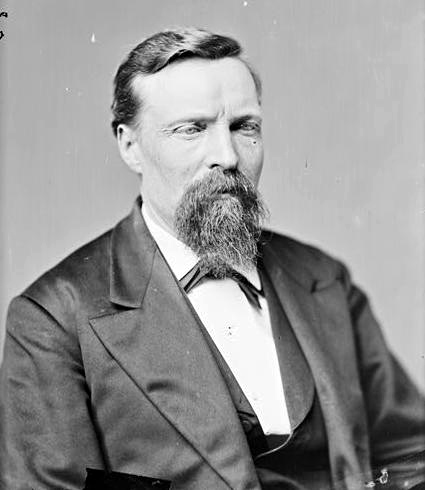

Member of the U.S. House of Representatives from Iowa's 6th district
- In office March 4, 1875 – March 3, 1879
- Preceded by: William Loughridge
- Succeeded by: James Weaver

Member of the Iowa Senate from the 17th district district
- In office January 8, 1866 – January 12, 1868
- Preceded by: John Chrisfield Hogin
- Succeeded by: John C. Johnson

Personal details
- Born: December 6, 1831 Huron County, Ohio, US
- Died: October 7, 1892 (aged 60) Sigourney, Iowa, US
- Party: Republican
- Profession: Politician, Lawyer, Judge

Military service
- Branch/service: Union Army
- Rank: Lieutenant colonel
- Unit: 5th Iowa Infantry Regiment
- Battles/wars: Civil War

Ezekiel Silas Sampson (December 6, 1831 – October 7, 1892) was a lawyer, prosecutor, Civil War officer, judge, and two-term Republican Congressman from Iowa's 6th congressional district.

== Early life ==
Born in Huron County, Ohio, Sampson moved to Keokuk County, Iowa, in 1843 where he attended public schools as a child. He later attended Howe’s Academy and Knox College, studied law and was admitted to the bar in 1856, commencing practice in Sigourney, Iowa. He was prosecuting attorney of Keokuk County from 1856 to 1858.

== Career ==
At the outbreak of the Civil War, Sampson enlisted in the Union Army as a captain in the 5th Iowa Volunteer Infantry Regiment in 1861 and was later promoted to lieutenant colonel of the same regiment, serving as so until he was mustered out of service in 1864.

After the war, he resumed practicing law in Sigourney. He was a member of the Iowa Senate in 1866 and was judge of the sixth district of Iowa from 1867 to 1875.

In 1874, Sampson was elected a Republican to represent Iowa's 6th congressional district in the United States House of Representatives. Near the end of his service in the 44th United States Congress, he was re-elected in 1876 to a second term, and served in the 45th United States Congress. When running for a third term in 1878, he was defeated in the general election by Greenback Party candidate (and future presidential candidate) James B. Weaver. Sampson served in Congress from March 4, 1875 to March 3, 1879.

== Death ==
Sampson resumed practicing law until his death in Sigourney on October 7, 1892. He is interred at West Cemetery in Sigourney, Iowa.

U.S. House of Representatives
| Preceded by William Loughridge | Member of the U.S. House of Representatives from Iowa's 6th congressional district March 4, 1875 – March 3, 1879 (obsolete district) | Succeeded by James Weaver |
