= Jacob Grimstead =

American politician (1905–1993)

Member of the Iowa Senate from the 41st district
- In office January 12, 1953 – January 10, 1965
- Preceded by: Leo Elthon
- Succeeded by: Hilarius Heying

Personal details
- Born: April 11, 1905 Nissedal, Telemark, Norway
- Died: November 18, 1993 (aged 88)
- Party: Republican

Jacob Grimstead (April 11, 1905 – November 18, 1993) was an American politician who served in the Iowa Senate from the 41st district from 1953 to 1965.
