= Brian Best (politician) =

American businessman and politician (born 1959)

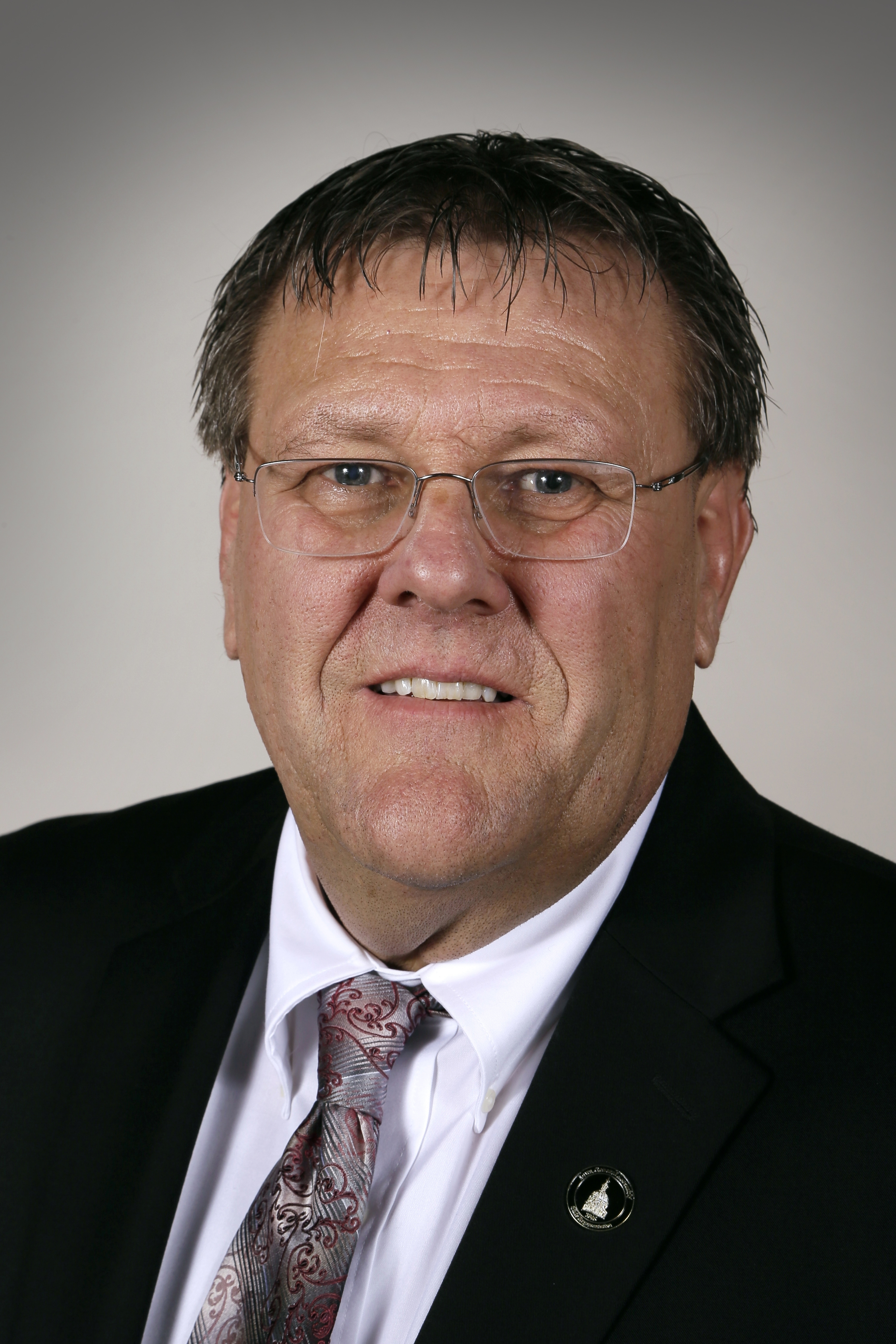
- 87th General Assembly portrait (2017)

Member of the Iowa House of Representatives from the 11th district
- In office January 12, 2015 – January 13, 2025
- Preceded by: Dan Muhlbauer
- Succeeded by: Craig Williams

Personal details
- Born: December 12, 1959 (age 66) Glidden, Iowa, U.S.
- Party: Republican
- Education: University of Northern Iowa
- Website: legis.iowa.gov/...

Brian Best (born December 12, 1959) is an American businessman and politician who served in the Iowa House of Representatives from the 11th District. A Republican, he served in the Iowa House of Representatives from 2015 to 2025.

== Electoral history ==
Best was elected in 2014, defeating incumbent representative, Democrat Dan Muhlbauer. He was reelected in 2016, besting Democratic opponent Ken Myers.

Election	Political result	Candidate	Party	Votes	%
Iowa House of Representatives general elections, 2014; District 12; Turnout: 11,794	Republican gain from Democratic	Brian Best	Republican	6,445	54.6%
Iowa House of Representatives general elections, 2014; District 12; Turnout: 11,794	Republican gain from Democratic	Dan Muhlbauer*	Democratic	5,349	45.4%
Iowa House of Representatives general elections, 2016; District 12; Turnout: 15,996	Republican	Brian Best	Republican	10,349	64.7%
Iowa House of Representatives general elections, 2016; District 12; Turnout: 15,996	Republican	Ken Myers	Democratic	4,369	27.3%
Iowa House of Representatives general elections, 2018; District 12; Turnout: 12,865	Republican	Brian Best	Republican	8,458	65.7%
Iowa House of Representatives general elections, 2018; District 12; Turnout: 12,865	Republican	Peter Leo	Democratic	4,402	34.2%
Iowa House of Representatives general elections, 2020; District 12; Turnout: 16,813	Republican	Brian Best	Republican	11,702	69.6%
Iowa House of Representatives general elections, 2020; District 12; Turnout: 16,813	Republican	Sam Muhr	Democratic	3,280	19.5%

Iowa House of Representatives
Preceded by Gary Worthan	12th District; 2023–2025	Succeeded by Craig Williams
Preceded by Dan Muhlbauer	12th District; 2015–2023	Succeeded by Steven Holt
