= Robert Dague =

American politician and journalist (1841–1918)

Robert Addison Dague (27 March 1841 – 16 February 1918) was an American politician in Iowa.

Dague was born near Stanton, a town in Morrow County, Ohio, on 27 March 1841. In 1863, he was made a sergeant in Company G of the 88th Ohio Infantry Regiment and discharged shortly thereafter for health reasons. Dague subsequently moved to Osceola, Iowa. He was affiliated with the Republican Party and served a single four-year term for District 6 of the Iowa Senate between 1872 and 1876. Outside of politics, Dague was a newspaper journalist and editor of the Osceola Sentinel. He died in Creston on 16 February 1918.
