= Napoleon Bonaparte Moore =

American politician (1832–1910)

Napoleon Bonaparte Moore (September 7, 1832 – August 2, 1910) was an American judge and politician.

Moore was born in London, Ohio, on September 7, 1832, and worked for his father's dry goods store between the ages of eight and fourteen, when he enrolled in Wesleyan University in Delaware, Ohio. Aged 18, Moore moved to a farm to improve his health, where he remained until he was 21. He then moved to Charleston, Ohio, and ran his own business until 1855. With his health again deteriorating, Moore settled in Eddyville, Iowa, and found work as a teacher. In two years, Moore also passed the bar exam, subsequently relocating to Bedford, Iowa, to practice law. In 1860, Moore relocated to Clarinda, Iowa, where he reestablished his law firm. From 1867, he lived on a farm near Clarinda.

Between 1861 and 1865, Moore served as a Page County judge. After stepping down from the judgeship, Moore began the first bank in southwestern Iowa, and was elected to the Iowa Senate in 1867. More held the District 8 seat from January 13, 1868, to January 7, 1872, as a Republican. Moore remained active in the financial sector as well, founding the First National Bank of Clarinda in 1871, the Shenandoah-based Moore and Webster in 1872, and Crum, Moore and Van Fleet in Bedford in 1873, which later became the Bedford Bank. From 1881 to 1885, Moore was mayor of Clarinda.

Moore was a Methodist, and attended a general conference held in Baltimore, Maryland, in May 1876. He was affiliated with York Rite Freemasonry, attained the 32nd degree in 1859, and was prelate of the local commandery. Following retirement in 1888, Moore lived in Fort Worth, Texas, where he died on August 2, 1910.
