= John G. Patterson =

American politician (1831–1878)

John G. Patterson (September 3, 1831 – October 29, 1878) was an American politician.

Born on September 3, 1831, in Clinton County, Pennsylvania, to parents Robert Patterson and Eleanor Bowers, John Patterson was raised in Seneca County, Ohio, where his parents had moved when he was two years old. He attended and taught at the Republic Academy while working on the family farm in the summer. From 1854 to September 1856, when he passed the bar exam, Patterson read law with the Pennington & Lee firm in Tiffin. In June 1857, Patterson moved to Charles City, Iowa, where he established his own law firm. In 1861, Patterson and Samuel B. Starr began practicing law jointly.

Patterson was first elected to the Iowa Senate as a Republican in 1863. In the midst of his first term, he was redistricted from District 42 to District 43. In 1867, he won a full four-year term for District 43, serving until 1872.

Patterson died on October 29, 1878, in a construction trailer derailment on the Milwaukee Road, twelve miles west of Spencer, Iowa.

The town that is now Hull, Iowa, was originally named Pattersonville, to commemorate John G. Patterson.
