= Homer E. Newell Jr. =

American mathematician (1915–1983)

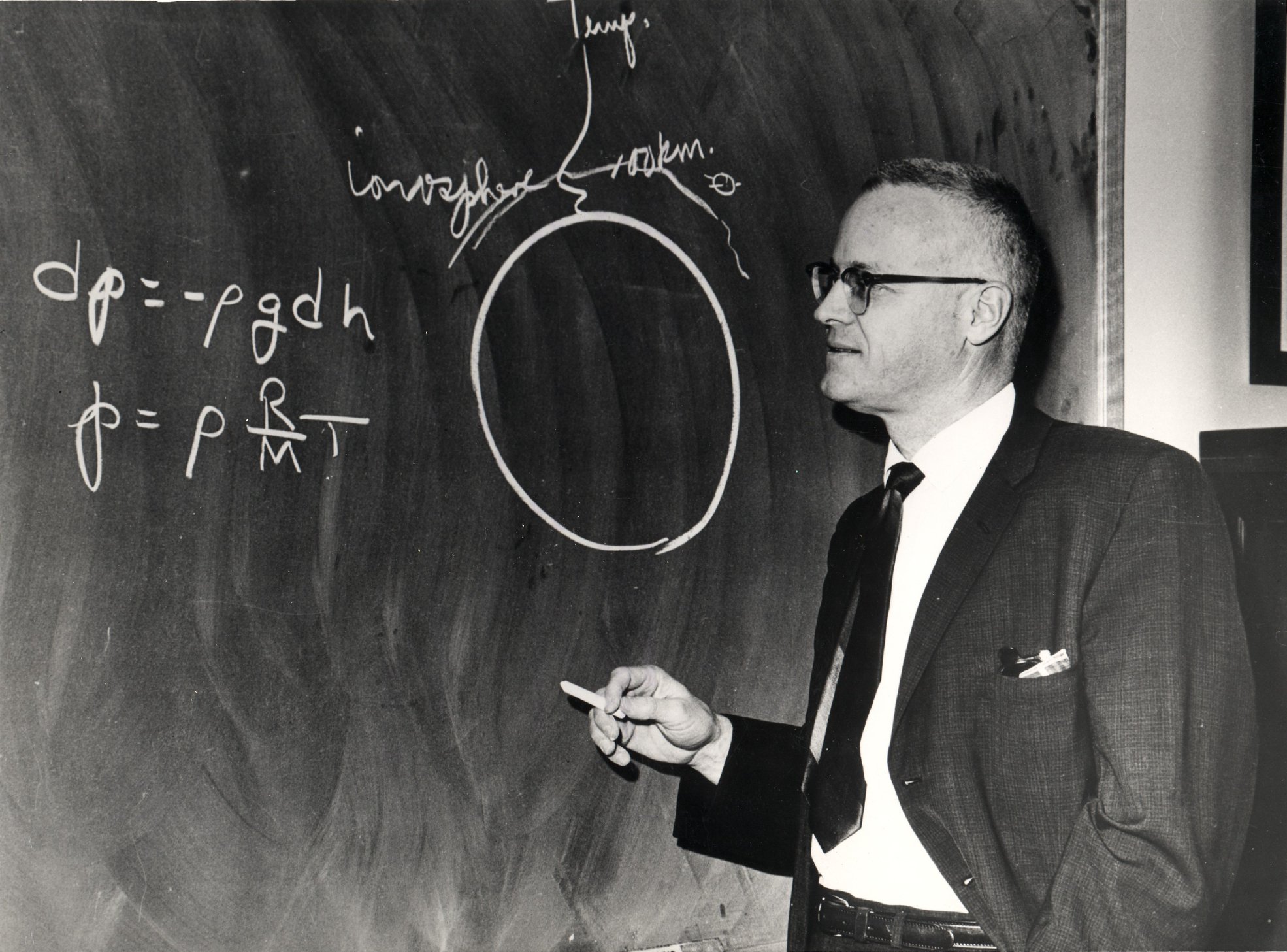
- Dr. Newell explaining principles of altitude, pressure, and temperature, c. 1973
- Born: Homer Edward Newell Jr. March 11, 1915; Holyoke, Massachusetts, U.S.
- Died: July 18, 1983 (aged 68); Alexandria, Virginia, U.S.
- Education: Harvard University (BA, MA); University of Wisconsin–Madison (PhD)
- Occupations: Mathematics professor, NASA administrator
- Known for: Chairing committee of scientists for establishment of a civilian space agency (NASA); Drafting the first national plan for unmanned exploration of the Moon and planets; Developed NASA protocol for scientific experiment selection
- Awards: President's Award for Distinguished Federal Civilian Service (1965)

Homer Edward Newell Jr. (March 11, 1915 – July 18, 1983) was an American mathematics professor and author who became a powerful United States government science administrator—eventually rising to the number three position at the National Aeronautics and Space Administration (NASA). In the early 1960s, he either controlled or influenced virtually all non-military uncrewed space missions for the free world.

== Early life and education ==
Newell was born March 11, 1915, in Holyoke, Massachusetts. He was educated in the public schools, graduating at the top of his class from Holyoke High in 1932. In a 1980 interview, he recalled that his interest in science arose from his grandfather Arthur J. Newell, an engineer for a local electrical equipment manufacturer, who had an extensive private library where Newell found books on astronomy and chemistry. Arthur also provided the money for his grandson's university education at Harvard University, where he graduated with a 1936 Bachelor of Arts in Math, and a 1937 Master of Arts in Teaching. He applied for a scholarship to pursue a Doctorate in Math, but Harvard did not award it. Instead, he completed his education at the University of Wisconsin–Madison, which awarded him a Math Ph.D. in 1940 with Rudolf Langer as thesis advisor.

== Career ==
From 1940 to 1944, Newell was an instructor, and then assistant professor of mathematics at the University of Maryland. During World War II he also worked as a Civil Aeronautics Authority (CAA) ground instructor in air navigation, taught engineering classes for military cadets, and briefly taught astronomy. The additional work for the CAA and military ended in 1944, and Newell, who was unhappy as a professor, applied for positions at several organizations doing military research. He was offered a contract position at the Naval Research Laboratory (NRL)'s communications security section in 1944, and later that year became an NRL employee. In 1945, the communications security section became the rocket sonde section. Newell became successively head of the theoretical analysis subsection, associate head of the section, and by 1947 headed the section; which performed upper atmosphere research using rockets including German-built V2s, US-built Aerobees and eventually NRL's own Viking; mostly launched from the White Sands Missile Range.

In 1954, when President Dwight D. Eisenhower assigned NRL responsibility to launch satellites during the International Geophysical Year (IGY), Newell was promoted to Acting Superintendent of NRL's Atmosphere and Astrophysics division, with an additional assignment as science coordinator for Project Vanguard. In this position, Newell worked with the National Academy of Sciences to identify which experiments would be flown on Vanguard satellites. In the wake of the first two Soviet satellites, and the explosion of the first Vanguard on the launch pad, one of the experiment packages selected by Newell was switched to the U.S. Army's Explorer I satellite, which subsequently discovered the Van Allen radiation belts.

=== NASA ===
Newell played a significant behind the scenes role in the negotiations which led to the creation of NASA, chairing a committee of rocket and satellite experimenters that drafted a consensus plan for a national space establishment which was presented to Eisenhower's science advisor, and advising the Senate preparedness investigating subcommittee. In both roles, Newell—though at this time a senior DOD administrator—both publicly and privately advocated transfer of space activities to a separate civilian agency. When the legislation establishing NASA was passed in 1958, Newell was given credit by his peers, including Van Allen, who called him "The Spark Plug" for a strong space science element in NASA. Newell joined NASA in 1958, and was successively assistant director for space sciences (1958-1960), deputy director of space flight programs (1960-1961), director of space sciences (1961-1963), associate administrator for space science and applications (1963-1967) and finally associate administrator of NASA (1967-1974). In 1965, Newell was awarded the President's Award for Distinguished Federal Civilian Service

While at NASA, Newell drafted the first national plan for unmanned exploration of the Moon and planets, developed NASA's procedure for scientific experiment selection, and was responsible for NASA's university programs. His influence peaked in the 1963-1967 period, when his Office of Space Science and Applications (OSSA) operated effectively as a nearly independent space program, not only selecting experiments and contracting for satellites and space probes but also contracting for launch vehicles and acting as the "executive agent" for space launch for other U.S. and allied agencies. The first civil weather, communications, and Earth resources satellites date from this period.

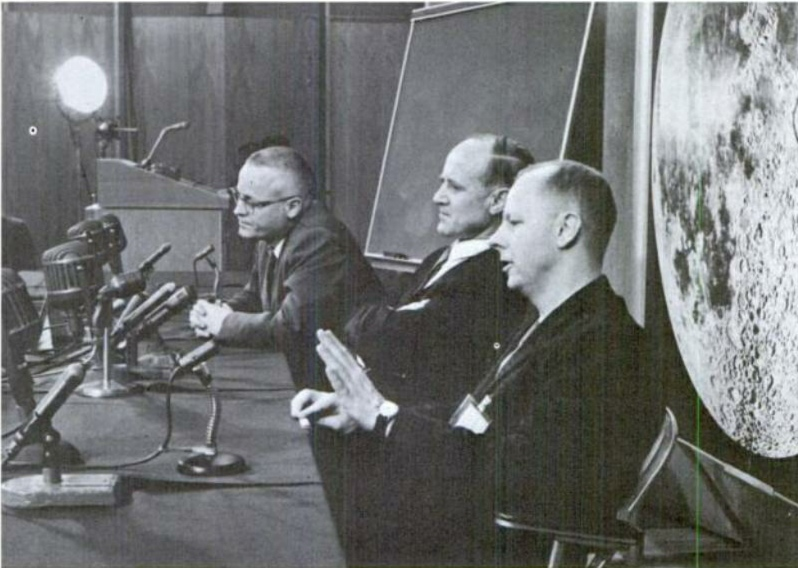
Homer Newell, William Pickering, and Harris Schurmeier answer newsmen's questions at Ranger 6 Postflight Press Conference

In 1967, Newell was promoted to the position of associate administrator of NASA, the third-ranking position in the agency, which he held until his retirement in 1974. He held this post under four successive NASA administrators. Among other activities in this position, he traveled to the Rice Hotel in Houston to meet with disgruntled scientist-astronauts in 1971. Among the results of that meeting was the assignment of Dr. Harrison Schmitt as the last human being (and only scientist) to set foot on the surface of the Moon.

Newell retired from NASA in 1974. He wrote at least eight books, one of which, Vector Analysis, (McGraw Hill, NY,1955) remains in print today. His last book, Beyond the Atmosphere: Early Years of Space Science (NASA SP-4211), is widely referenced as a historical source. Newell died on July 18, 1983, leaving behind his wife, four children, eleven grandchildren, his books and a robust space science program. His name, while not widely recognized today by non-specialists, was commemorated in the Goddard Space Flight Center's Homer E. Newell memorial library, and asteroid 2086 Newell.
