= Iowa's 6th Senate district =

American legislative district

Coordinates: 42°10′N 95°00′W

Iowa's 6th State Senate district
Senator
Jason Schultz; R

The 6th district of the Iowa Senate is located in western Iowa. It is currently composed of Audubon, Carroll, Crawford, Ida, and Shelby counties, and part of Pottawattamie County.

== Current elected officials ==
Jason Schultz is the senator currently representing the 6th District.

The area of the 6th District contains two Iowa House of Representatives districts:

- The 11th District (represented by Brian Best)
- The 12th District (represented by Steven Holt)

The district is also located in Iowa's 4th congressional district, which is represented by U.S. Representative Randy Feenstra.

== List of representatives ==
Representative	Party	Dates	Residence	Notes
Milton Browning	Whig	1846-1849	Burlington	
Samuel Fullenwider	Whig	1846-1847	Des Moines County	
Alfred Fear	Democrat	1848-1849	Burlington	
George Hepner	Democrat	1850-1851	Des Moines County	
Enos Lowe	Democrat	1850-1851	Des Moines County	
John Hedrick	Whig	1852-1853	Wapello County	
James Ramsey	Democrat	1854-1855	Wapello County	
William Reed	Republican	1856-1859	Jefferson County	
James Hagans	Republican	1860-1863	Ringgold County	
Columbus Bridges	Republican	1864-1867	Decatur County	
Edward Bill	Republican	1868-1869	Albia, Iowa	
James Wright	Republican	1870-1871	Chariton, Iowa	
Robert Dague	Republican	1872-1875	Osceola, Iowa	
Samuel Bestow	Republican	1876-1877	Chariton, Iowa	
Frederick Joseph Teale	Republican	1878-1879	Decatur City, Iowa	
Isaac Keller	Republican	1880-1883	Mount Ayr, Iowa	
Anson Stephens	Republican	1884-1887	Creston, Iowa	
George Finn	Republican	1888-1895	Bedford, Iowa	
William Mitchell	Republican	1896-1899	Chariton, Iowa	
Franklin Arthaud	Republican	1900-1903	Taylor County	
Daniel Turner	Republican	1904-1908	Corning, Iowa	
Theophilus Bennett	Republican	1909-1912	Lenox, Iowa	
Albert Nye	Republican	1913-1916	Athelstan, Iowa	
Benjamin Gibson	Republican	1917-1918	Corning, Iowa	Resigned while in office to serve in the US Army during World War I.
Francis Shane	Republican	1919-1920	Villisca, Iowa	
John Tuck	Republican	1921-1924	Corning, Iowa	
Samuel Fackler	Republican	1925-1928	Prescott, Iowa	
Arthur Leonard	Republican	1929-1932	Adams County	
Claude Stanley	Republican	1933-1936	Corning, Iowa	
Ole Kirketeg	Republican	1937-1940	Bedford, Iowa	
William Turner	Republican	1941-1944	Lenox, Iowa	
Ole Kirketeg	Republican	1945	Bedford, Iowa	Senator Kirketeg died while in office in 1945.
Kathlyn Kirketeg	Republican	1945-1948	Bedford, Iowa	Wife of Ole Kirketeg, Senator Kirketeg took her husband's position after his death in 1945 and was subsequently elected to complete his term, making her the first woman senator in the state of Iowa.
Ernest Humbert	Republican	1949-1952	Corning, Iowa	Senator Humbert died while in office in 1952.
Thomas Larson	Republican	1953-1956	Conway, Iowa	
Francis Turner	Republican	1957-1960	Corning, Iowa	
Orval Walter	Democrat	1961-1964	Lenox, Iowa	
Charles Vernon Lisle	Republican	1963-1969	Clarinda, Iowa	
Earl Bass	Republican	1969-1970	Malvern, Iowa	Elected in a special election.
George Shawer	Republican	1971-1972	Fredericksburg, Iowa	
Kenneth Scott	Democrat	1973-1976	Cerro Gordo County	
Alvin Miller	Democrat	1977-1982	Clear Lake, Iowa	
Lee Holt	Republican	1983-1988	Ottosen, Iowa	
John Kibbie	Democrat	1989-1992	Palo Alto County	
Wayne Bennett	Republican	1993-1996	Ida Grove, Iowa	
Steve King	Republican	1997-2002	Odebolt, Iowa	King was elected to the US House of Representatives in 2002.
E. Thurman Gaskill	Republican	2003-2008	Hancock County	
Merlin Bartz	Republican	2009-2012	Grafton, Iowa	
Mark Segebart	Republican	2013-2020	Crawford County	
Craig Williams	Republican	2021-2022	Manning, Iowa	
Jason Schultz	Republican	2023-present	Crawford County	

== Historical district boundaries ==
Map	Description	Years effective	Notes
	Des Moines County	1846-1851	From 1846 to 1857, district numbering was not utilized by the Iowa State Legislature. This convention was added with the passing of the 1857 Iowa Constitution. Numbering of districts pre-1857 is done as a matter of historic convenience.
	Wapello County	1852-1855	
	Jefferson County	1856-1859	
	Adams County Ringgold County; Taylor County; Union County	1860-1861	
	Adams County Montgomery County; Page County; Ringgold County; Taylor County; Union County	1862-1863	
	Decatur County	1864-1865	
	Decatur County Ringgold County	1866-1867	
	Monroe County	1868-1869	
	Clarke County Lucas County; Union County	1870-1873	
	Clarke County Lucas County	1874-1877	
	Decatur County Ringgold County; Taylor County	1878-1883	
	Ringgold County Taylor County; Union County	1884-1887	
	Adams County Taylor County	1888-1962	
	Fremont County Mills County; Page County	1963-1970	
	Bremer County Chickasaw County; Howard County; Winneshiek County (partial)	1971-1972	In 1970, the Iowa Legislature passed an amendment to the Iowa Constitution setting forth the rules for legislative redistricting in order to abide by the rules established by the Reynolds v. Sims Supreme Court case. The first reapportionment map created by the Republican controlled legislature was deemed unconstitutional, but was still used for the 1970 election.
	Cerro Gordo County (partial) Worth County	1973-1982	
	Clay County (partial) Dickinson County; Emmet County; Palo Alto County (partial)	1983-1992	
	Crawford County Ida County; Monona County; Sac County; Woodbury County (partial)	1993-2002	
	Cerro Gordo (partial): Excluding; Mason Township; Owen Township; Portland Township; Mason City; Franklin County (partial): Excluding; Ackley; Dows; Hancock County; Winnebago County; Worth County	2003-2012	
	Audubon County Buena Vista; Carroll County; Crawford County (partial): East Boyer; Hayes Township; Iowa Township; Jackson Township; Milford Township; Nishnabotny Township; Stockholm Township; West Side Township; Aspinwall; Deloit; Manilla; Vail; Westside	2013-2022	
	Audubon County Carroll County; Crawford County; Ida County; Pottawattamie County (partial): Knox Township; Pleasant Township; Avoca; Shelby; Shelby County	2023-present	

== See also ==
- Iowa General Assembly
- Iowa Senate
