= Robert Smyth (American politician) =

Irish-born American politician (1814–1898)

Robert Smyth (26 February 1814 – 3 April 1898) was an Irish-born American politician.

Smyth was born in Ireland on 26 February 1814. He immigrated to the United States in 1834 and settled in Linn County, Iowa by 1840. Smyth served as the first postmaster of Franklin Township, as well as a township clerk. Between 1843 and 1845, he served in the Iowa Territorial Legislature for District 8. He was a member of the Iowa House of Representatives for District 20 from 1846 to 1848, during the first convocation of the Iowa General Assembly. At the time, Symth was affiliated with the Democratic Party. From 1852 to 1866, Smyth primarily resided in Marion. Between 1868 and 1872, Smyth sat on the Iowa Senate, representing District 31 until 1870 and District 32 thereafter. Between 1884 and 1886, he held the District 48 seat in the Iowa House of Representatives. During his latter terms as a state legislator, Smyth was a Republican.

Outside of politics, Smyth was a realtor, banker and paymaster of the United States Army. He died in Mount Vernon on 3 April 1898.
