= Liberty Fellows =

American politician (1834–1912)

Liberty Eaton Fellows (August 22, 1834 – July 17, 1912) was an American politician and judge.

Fellows was born in Corinth, Vermont, on August 22, 1834, and attended the local common schools before completing high school at Thetford Academy. He moved to Wisconsin in 1856, before settling in Allamakee County, Iowa, the following year. In Iowa, Fellows farmed and worked as a county clerk. After gaining admittance to the bar in 1862, Fellows moved into Lansing to practice law.

Fellows was elected to the Iowa House of Representatives in 1865, and held the District 50 seat from January 8, 1866, to January 12, 1868. He then succeeded Charles Paulk on the Iowa Senate, representing Iowa Senate between January 13, 1868, and January 7, 1872. In 1883, Fellows changed his party affiliation from Democratic to Republican. In 1889, Fellows was appointed by governor William Larrabee to fill an unexpired term as judge of the thirteenth judicial district. He served five full judicial terms in his own right, and died in the midst of his sixth, on July 17, 1912.

Liberty Fellows married Mary S. Reed on July 4, 1861. The couple had eleven children, eight of whom survived Fellows. A son, Albert Fellows, later served on the Iowa General Assembly.
