= 77th United States Congress =

1941–1943 U.S. Congress

←	76th	78th	→
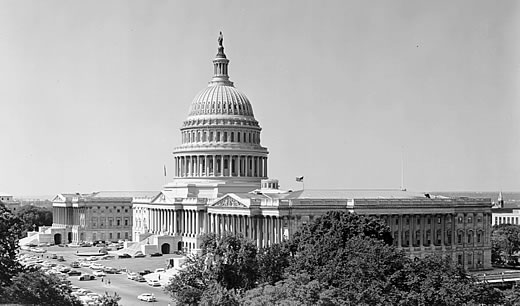
- United States Capitol (1956)

Overview
- Legislative body: United States Congress
- Jurisdiction: United States
- Term: January 3, 1941 – January 3, 1943

Senate
- Members: 96
- President: John N. Garner (D) (Note: U.S. Vice President John N. Garner's term as President of the Senate ended at noon January 20, 1941, when Henry A. Wallace's term began.) (until January 20, 1941); Henry A. Wallace (D) (from January 20, 1941)
- President pro tempore: Pat Harrison (D) (until June 22, 1941); Carter Glass (D) (from July 11, 1941)
- Party control: Democratic

House of Representatives
- Members: 435 representatives 4 non-voting delegates
- Speaker: Sam Rayburn (D)
- Party control: Democratic

Sessions
- 1st: January 3, 1941 – January 2, 1942
- 2nd: January 5, 1942 – December 16, 1942

The 77th United States Congress was a meeting of the legislative branch of the United States federal government, composed of the United States Senate and the United States House of Representatives. It met in Washington, D.C., from January 3, 1941, to January 3, 1943, during the ninth and tenth years of Franklin D. Roosevelt's presidency. The apportionment of seats in the House of Representatives was based on the 1930 United States census.

Both chambers maintained a Democratic majority - with the Senate being a supermajority. With the reelection of President Franklin D. Roosevelt to a then record third term, the Democrats maintained an overall federal government trifecta.

This was the first Congress to have more than one Senate president (John Garner and Henry Wallace) due to the passage of the 20th Amendment in 1933.

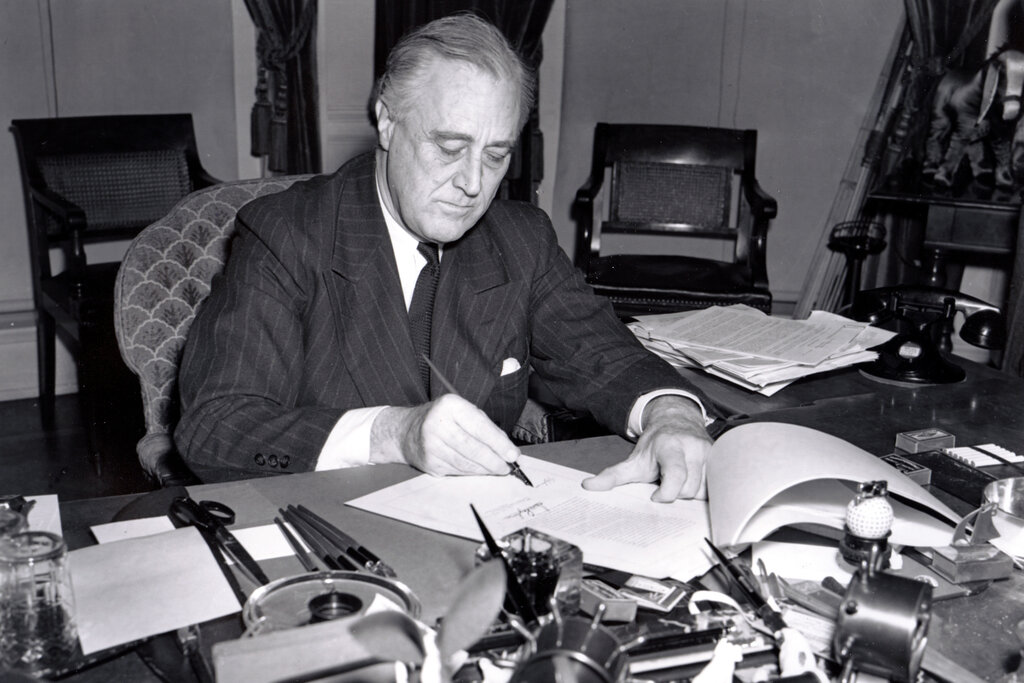
President Franklin Roosevelt signing the Lend-Lease Act, March 11, 1941.

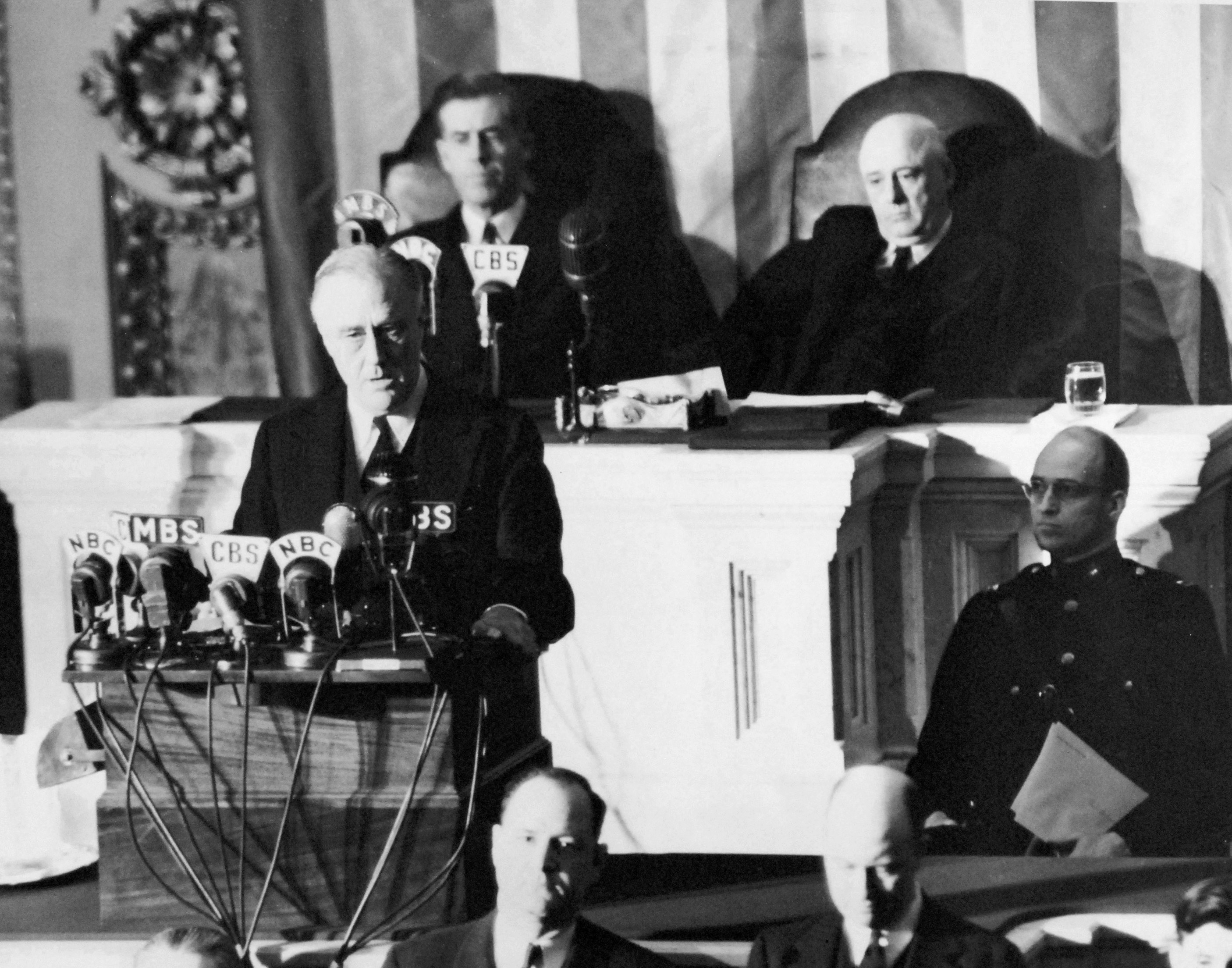
President Roosevelt delivering the "Infamy Speech" to Congress, requesting a declaration of war, December 8, 1941. Behind him are Vice President Henry Wallace (left) and House Speaker Sam Rayburn. To the right, in uniform in front of Rayburn, is Roosevelt's son James, who escorted his father to the Capitol.

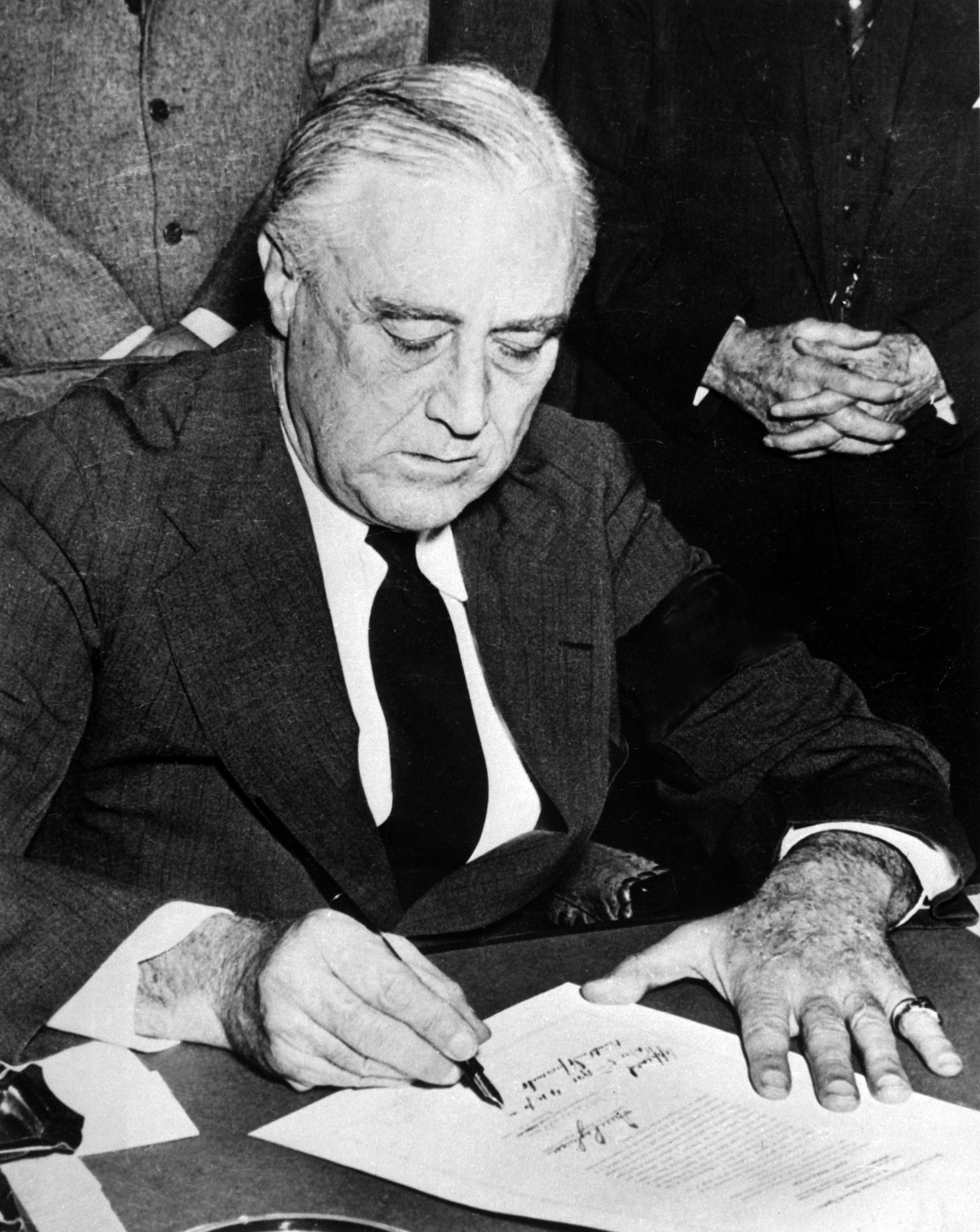
President Roosevelt signing the declaration of war against Japan, December 8, 1941

== Major events ==
- January 20, 1941: President Franklin D. Roosevelt began his third term.
- December 7, 1941: Attack on Pearl Harbor
- December 8, 1941: Joint Session of Congress met to hear President Roosevelt deliver his "Day of Infamy" speech
- December 26, 1941: Joint session of the United States Congress met in the Senate chamber for an address by British Prime Minister Winston Churchill.

== Major legislation and resolutions ==
- March 11, 1941: Lend Lease Act, Pub. L. 77–11, Sess. 1, ch. 11, 55 Stat. 31
- August 18, 1941: Flood Control Act of 1941, Pub. L. 77–228, Sess. 1, ch. 377, 55 Stat. 638
- December 8, 1941: Resolution— War between United States and Japan, Pub. L. 77–328, Sess. 1, ch. 561, 55 Stat. 795
- December 11, 1941: Resolution— War between United States and Germany, Pub. L. 77–331, Sess. 1, ch. 564, 55 Stat. 796
- December 11, 1941: Resolution— War between United States and Italy, Pub. L. 77–332, Sess. 1, ch. 565, 55 Stat. 797
- January 27, 1942: Air Raid Attack Act of 1942, Pub. L. 77–415, Sess. 2, ch. 20, 56 Stat. 19
- January 30, 1942: Emergency Price Control Act of 1942, Pub. L. 77–421, Sess. 2, ch. 26, 56 Stat. 23
- June 5, 1942: Resolution— War between United States and Bulgaria, Pub. L. 77–563, Sess. 2, ch. 323, 56 Stat. 307
- June 5, 1942: Resolution— War between United States and Hungary, Pub. L. 77–564, Sess. 2, ch. 324, 56 Stat. 307
- June 5, 1942: Resolution— War between United States and Romania, Pub. L. 77–565, Sess. 2, ch. 325, 56 Stat. 307
- June 22, 1942: Resolution— United States Flag Code, including recognition of the Pledge of Allegiance, Pub. L. 77–623, Sess. 2, ch. 435, 56 Stat. 377
- October 2, 1942: Stabilization Act of 1942, Pub. L. 77–729, Sess. 2, ch. 578, 56 Stat. 765

== Select committees ==
- Truman Committee (officially the United States Senate Special Committee to Investigate the National Defense Program)

== Leadership ==
=== Senate ===
- President: John Nance Garner (D), until January 20, 1941
  - Henry A. Wallace (D), from January 20, 1941
- President pro tempore: Pat Harrison (D), until June 22, 1941
  - Carter Glass (D), from July 10, 1941

==== Majority (Democratic) leadership ====
- Majority leader: Alben W. Barkley
- Majority Whip: Lister Hill
- Democratic Caucus Secretary: Joshua B. Lee

==== Minority (Republican) leadership ====
- Minority leader: Charles L. McNary
- Republican Conference Secretary: Wallace H. White Jr.
- National Senatorial Committee Chair: John G. Townsend Jr.

=== House of Representatives ===
- Speaker: Sam Rayburn (D)

==== Majority (Democratic) leadership ====
- Majority leader: John William McCormack
- Democratic Whip: Patrick J. Boland, until May 18, 1942
  - Robert Ramspeck
- Democratic Caucus Chairman: Richard M. Duncan
- Democratic Campaign Committee Chairman: Patrick H. Drewry

==== Minority (Republican) leadership ====
- Minority leader: Joseph William Martin Jr.
- Republican Whip: Harry Lane Englebright
- Republican Conference Chairman: Roy O. Woodruff
- Republican Campaign Committee Chairman: J. William Ditter

== Party summary ==
=== Senate ===
Senate composition by state 2 Democrats 2 Republicans 1 Democrat and 1 Republican 1 Republican and 1 Independent 1 Republican and 1 Progressive

	Party (shading shows control)					Total	Vacant
	Democratic (D)	Farmer– Labor (FL)	Wisconsin Progressive (P)	Republican (R)	Independent (I)	Total	Vacant
End of previous congress	68	1	1	25	1	96	0
Begin	66	0	1	28	1	96	0
End	64	0	1	30	1	96	0
Final voting share	66.7%	0.0%	1.0%	31.3%	1.0%		
Beginning of next congress	57	0	1	38	0	96	0

=== House of Representatives ===
	Party (shading shows control)						Total	Vacant
	Democratic (D)	Farmer– Labor (FL)	American Labor (AL)	Wisconsin Progressive (P)	Republican (R)	Other	Total	Vacant
End of previous congress	256	1	1	2	167	1	428	7
Begin	268	1	1	3	162	0	435	0
End	254	1	1	3	165	0	424	11
Final voting share	59.9%	0.2%	0.2%	0.7%	38.9%	0.0%		
Beginning of next congress	222	1	1	2	208	0	434	1

== Members ==
=== Senate ===
Senators are elected statewide every two years, with one-third beginning new six-year terms with each Congress. Preceding the names in the list below are Senate class numbers, which indicate the cycle of their election, In this Congress, Class 2 meant their term ended with this Congress, requiring reelection in 1942; Class 3 meant their term began in the last Congress, requiring reelection in 1944; and Class 1 meant their term began in this Congress, requiring reelection in 1946.

Currently, this is the last congressional session in which the Democratic Party commanded all Senate seats from the South.

Currently, this is the second and last congressional session in which Wyoming sent 3 democrats to Congress (senators Joesph C. O'Mahoney and Harry Schwartz, as well as representative at-large John J. McIntyre).

==== Alabama ====
▌2. John H. Bankhead II (D)
▌3. J. Lister Hill (D)

==== Arizona ====
▌1. Ernest McFarland (D)
▌3. Carl Hayden (D)

==== Arkansas ====
▌2. John E. Miller (D), until March 31, 1941

▌G. Lloyd Spencer (D), from April 1, 1941

▌3. Hattie Caraway (D)

==== California ====
▌1. Hiram W. Johnson (R)
▌3. Sheridan Downey (D)

==== Colorado ====
▌2. Edwin C. Johnson (D)
▌3. Alva B. Adams (D), until December 1, 1941

▌Eugene Millikin (R), from December 20, 1941

==== Connecticut ====
▌1. Francis T. Maloney (D)
▌3. John A. Danaher (R)

==== Delaware ====
▌1. James M. Tunnell (D)
▌2. James H. Hughes (D)

==== Florida ====
▌1. Charles O. Andrews (D)
▌3. Claude Pepper (D)

==== Georgia ====
▌2. Walter F. George (D)
▌3. Richard Russell Jr. (D)

==== Idaho ====
▌2. John Thomas (R)
▌3. D. Worth Clark (D)

==== Illinois ====
▌2. Charles W. Brooks (R)
▌3. Scott W. Lucas (D)

==== Indiana ====
▌1. Raymond E. Willis (R)
▌3. Frederick Van Nuys (D)

==== Iowa ====
▌2. Clyde L. Herring (D)
▌3. Guy M. Gillette (D)

==== Kansas ====
▌2. Arthur Capper (R)
▌3. Clyde M. Reed (R)

==== Kentucky ====
▌2. Happy Chandler (D)
▌3. Alben Barkley (D)

==== Louisiana ====
▌2. Allen J. Ellender (D)
▌3. John H. Overton (D)

==== Maine ====
▌1. Ralph Owen Brewster (R)
▌2. Wallace H. White Jr. (R)

==== Maryland ====
▌1. George L. P. Radcliffe (D)
▌3. Millard Tydings (D)

==== Massachusetts ====
▌1. David I. Walsh (D)
▌2. Henry Cabot Lodge Jr. (R)

==== Michigan ====
▌1. Arthur H. Vandenberg (R)
▌2. Prentiss M. Brown (D)

==== Minnesota ====
▌1. Henrik Shipstead (R)
▌2. Joseph H. Ball (R), until November 17, 1942

▌Arthur E. Nelson (R), from November 18, 1942

==== Mississippi ====
▌1. Theodore G. Bilbo (D)
▌2. Pat Harrison (D), until June 22, 1941

▌James Eastland (D), June 30, 1941 – September 28, 1941
▌Wall Doxey (D), from September 29, 1941

==== Missouri ====
▌1. Harry S. Truman (D)
▌3. Bennett Champ Clark (D)

==== Montana ====
▌1. Burton K. Wheeler (D)
▌2. James E. Murray (D)

==== Nebraska ====
▌1. Hugh A. Butler (R)
▌2. George William Norris (I)

==== Nevada ====
▌1. Berkeley L. Bunker (D), until December 6, 1942

▌James G. Scrugham (D), from December 7, 1942

▌3. Patrick A. McCarran (D)

==== New Hampshire ====
▌2. Styles Bridges (R)
▌3. Charles W. Tobey (R)

==== New Jersey ====
▌1. William Warren Barbour (R)
▌2. William H. Smathers (D)

==== New Mexico ====
▌1. Dennis Chávez (D)
▌2. Carl Hatch (D)

==== New York ====
▌1. James M. Mead (D)
▌3. Robert F. Wagner (D)

==== North Carolina ====
▌2. Josiah William Bailey (D)
▌3. Robert R. Reynolds (D)

==== North Dakota ====
▌1. William Langer (R-NPL)
▌3. Gerald Nye (R)

==== Ohio ====
▌1. Harold Hitz Burton (R)
▌3. Robert A. Taft (R)

==== Oklahoma ====
▌2. Joshua B. Lee (D)
▌3. Elmer Thomas (D)

==== Oregon ====
▌2. Charles L. McNary (R)
▌3. Rufus C. Holman (R)

==== Pennsylvania ====
▌1. Joseph F. Guffey (D)
▌3. James J. Davis (R)

==== Rhode Island ====
▌1. Peter G. Gerry (D)
▌2. Theodore F. Green (D)

==== South Carolina ====
▌2. James F. Byrnes (D), until July 17, 1941

▌Alva M. Lumpkin (D), July 22, 1941 – August 1, 1941
▌Roger C. Peace (D), August 5, 1941 – November 4, 1941
▌Burnet R. Maybank (D), from November 5, 1941

▌3. Ellison D. Smith (D)

==== South Dakota ====
▌2. William J. Bulow (D)
▌3. John Chandler Gurney (R)

==== Tennessee ====
▌1. Kenneth McKellar (D)
▌2. Tom Stewart (D)

==== Texas ====
▌1. Tom T. Connally (D)
▌2. Morris Sheppard (D), until April 9, 1941

▌Andrew Jackson Houston (D), April 21, 1941, until June 26, 1941
▌W. Lee O'Daniel (D), from June 28, 1941

==== Utah ====
▌1. Abe Murdock (D)
▌3. Elbert D. Thomas (D)

==== Vermont ====
▌1. Warren Austin (R)
▌3. George Aiken (R), from January 10, 1941

==== Virginia ====
▌1. Harry F. Byrd (D)
▌2. Carter Glass (D)

==== Washington ====
▌1. Monrad Wallgren (D)
▌3. Homer Bone (D)

==== West Virginia ====
▌1. Harley M. Kilgore (D)
▌2. Matthew M. Neely (D), until January 12, 1941

▌Joseph Rosier (D), January 13, 1941 – November 17, 1942
▌Hugh Ike Shott (R), from November 18, 1942

==== Wisconsin ====
▌1. Robert M. La Follette Jr. (P)
▌3. Alexander Wiley (R)

==== Wyoming ====
▌1. Joseph C. O'Mahoney (D)
▌2. Henry H. Schwartz (D)

=== House of Representatives ===
==== Alabama ====
▌1. Frank W. Boykin (D)
▌2. George M. Grant (D)
▌3. Henry B. Steagall (D)
▌4. Sam Hobbs (D)
▌5. Joe Starnes (D)
▌6. Pete Jarman (D)
▌7. Walter W. Bankhead (D), until February 1, 1941

▌Carter Manasco (D), from June 24, 1941

▌8. John J. Sparkman (D)
▌9. Luther Patrick (D)

==== Arizona ====
▌At-large. John R. Murdock (D)

==== Arkansas ====
▌1. Ezekiel C. Gathings (D)
▌2. Wilbur Mills (D)
▌3. Clyde T. Ellis (D)
▌4. William Fadjo Cravens (D)
▌5. David D. Terry (D)
▌6. William F. Norrell (D)
▌7. Oren Harris (D)

==== California ====
▌1. Clarence F. Lea (D)
▌2. Harry L. Englebright (R)
▌3. Frank H. Buck (D), until September 17, 1942
▌4. Thomas Rolph (R)
▌5. Richard J. Welch (R)
▌6. Albert E. Carter (R)
▌7. John H. Tolan (D)
▌8. Jack Z. Anderson (R)
▌9. Bertrand W. Gearhart (R)
▌10. Alfred J. Elliott (D)
▌11. John Carl Hinshaw (R)
▌12. Jerry Voorhis (D)
▌13. Charles Kramer (D)
▌14. Thomas F. Ford (D)
▌15. John M. Costello (D)
▌16. Leland M. Ford (R)
▌17. Lee E. Geyer (D), until October 11, 1941

▌Cecil R. King (D), from August 25, 1942

▌18. William Ward Johnson (R)
▌19. Harry R. Sheppard (D)
▌20. Edouard V. M. Izac (D)

==== Colorado ====
▌1. Lawrence Lewis (D)
▌2. William S. Hill (R)
▌3. John Chenoweth (R)
▌4. Edward T. Taylor (D), until September 3, 1941

▌Robert F. Rockwell (R), from December 9, 1941

==== Connecticut ====
▌1. Herman P. Kopplemann (D)
▌2. William J. Fitzgerald (D)
▌3. James A. Shanley (D)
▌4. Le Roy D. Downs (D)
▌5. J. Joseph Smith (D), until November 4, 1941

▌Joseph E. Talbot (R), from January 20, 1942

▌At-large. Lucien J. Maciora (D)

==== Delaware ====
▌At-large. Philip A. Traynor (D)

==== Florida ====
▌1. J. Hardin Peterson (D)
▌2. Robert A. Green (D)
▌3. Robert L. F. Sikes (D)
▌4. Pat Cannon (D)
▌5. Joe Hendricks (D)

==== Georgia ====
▌1. Hugh Peterson (D)
▌2. Edward E. Cox (D)
▌3. Stephen Pace (D)
▌4. Albert Sidney Camp (D)
▌5. Robert Ramspeck (D)
▌6. Carl Vinson (D)
▌7. Malcolm C. Tarver (D)
▌8. John S. Gibson (D)
▌9. B. Frank Whelchel (D)
▌10. Paul Brown (D)

==== Idaho ====
▌1. Compton I. White (D)
▌2. Henry Dworshak (R)

==== Illinois ====
▌1. Arthur W. Mitchell (D)
▌2. Raymond S. McKeough (D)
▌3. Edward A. Kelly (D)
▌4. Harry P. Beam (D), until December 6, 1942
▌5. Adolph J. Sabath (D)
▌6. A. F. Maciejewski (D), until December 8, 1942
▌7. Leonard W. Schuetz (D)
▌8. Leo Kocialkowski (D)
▌9. Charles S. Dewey (R)
▌10. George A. Paddock (R)
▌11. Chauncey W. Reed (R)
▌12. Noah M. Mason (R)
▌13. Leo E. Allen (R)
▌14. Anton J. Johnson (R)
▌15. Robert B. Chiperfield (R)
▌16. Everett M. Dirksen (R)
▌17. Leslie C. Arends (R)
▌18. Jessie Sumner (R)
▌19. William H. Wheat (R)
▌20. James M. Barnes (D)
▌21. George Evan Howell (R)
▌22. Edwin M. Schaefer (D)
▌23. Laurence F. Arnold (D)
▌24. James V. Heidinger (R)
▌25. C. W. Bishop (R)
▌At-large. Stephen A. Day (R)
▌At-large. William Stratton (R)

==== Indiana ====
▌1. William T. Schulte (D)
▌2. Charles A. Halleck (R)
▌3. Robert A. Grant (R)
▌4. George W. Gillie (R)
▌5. Forest Harness (R)
▌6. Noble J. Johnson (R)
▌7. Gerald W. Landis (R)
▌8. John W. Boehne Jr. (D)
▌9. Earl Wilson (R)
▌10. Raymond S. Springer (R)
▌11. William H. Larrabee (D)
▌12. Louis Ludlow (D)

==== Iowa ====
▌1. Thomas E. Martin (R)
▌2. William S. Jacobsen (D)
▌3. John W. Gwynne (R)
▌4. Henry O. Talle (R)
▌5. Karl M. LeCompte (R)
▌6. Paul H. Cunningham (R)
▌7. Ben F. Jensen (R)
▌8. Fred C. Gilchrist (R)
▌9. Vincent F. Harrington (D), until September 5, 1942

▌Harry E. Narey (R), from November 3, 1942

==== Kansas ====
▌1. William P. Lambertson (R)
▌2. Ulysses S. Guyer (R)
▌3. Thomas Daniel Winter (R)
▌4. Edward Herbert Rees (R)
▌5. John Mills Houston (D)
▌6. Frank Carlson (R)
▌7. Clifford R. Hope (R)

==== Kentucky ====
▌1. Noble J. Gregory (D)
▌2. Beverly M. Vincent (D)
▌3. Emmet O'Neal (D)
▌4. Edward W. Creal (D)
▌5. Brent Spence (D)
▌6. Virgil Chapman (D)
▌7. Andrew J. May (D)
▌8. Joe B. Bates (D)
▌9. John M. Robsion (R)

==== Louisiana ====
▌1. F. Edward Hébert (D)
▌2. Hale Boggs (D)
▌3. James R. Domengeaux (D)
▌4. Overton Brooks (D)
▌5. Newt V. Mills (D)
▌6. Jared Y. Sanders Jr. (D)
▌7. Vance Plauché (D)
▌8. A. Leonard Allen (D)

==== Maine ====
▌1. James C. Oliver (R)
▌2. Margaret Chase Smith (R)
▌3. Frank Fellows (R)

==== Maryland ====
▌1. David Jenkins Ward (D)
▌2. William P. Cole Jr. (D), until October 26, 1942
▌3. Thomas D'Alesandro Jr. (D)
▌4. John Ambrose Meyer (D)
▌5. Lansdale G. Sasscer (D)
▌6. William D. Byron (D), until February 27, 1941

▌Katharine Byron (D), from May 27, 1941

==== Massachusetts ====
▌1. Allen T. Treadway (R)
▌2. Charles Clason (R)
▌3. Joseph E. Casey (D)
▌4. Pehr G. Holmes (R)
▌5. Edith Nourse Rogers (R)
▌6. George J. Bates (R)
▌7. Lawrence J. Connery (D), until October 19, 1941

▌Thomas J. Lane (D), from December 30, 1941

▌8. Arthur D. Healey (D), until August 3, 1942
▌9. Thomas H. Eliot (D)
▌10. George H. Tinkham (R)
▌11. Thomas A. Flaherty (D)
▌12. John W. McCormack (D)
▌13. Richard B. Wigglesworth (R)
▌14. Joseph W. Martin Jr. (R)
▌15. Charles L. Gifford (R)

==== Michigan ====
▌1. Rudolph G. Tenerowicz (D)
▌2. Earl C. Michener (R)
▌3. Paul W. Shafer (R)
▌4. Clare E. Hoffman (R)
▌5. Bartel J. Jonkman (R)
▌6. William W. Blackney (R)
▌7. Jesse P. Wolcott (R)
▌8. Fred L. Crawford (R)
▌9. Albert J. Engel (R)
▌10. Roy O. Woodruff (R)
▌11. Fred Bradley (R)
▌12. Frank Hook (D)
▌13. George D. O'Brien (D)
▌14. Louis C. Rabaut (D)
▌15. John D. Dingell Sr. (D)
▌16. John Lesinski Sr. (D)
▌17. George A. Dondero (R)

==== Minnesota ====
▌1. August H. Andresen (R)
▌2. Joseph P. O'Hara (R)
▌3. Richard Pillsbury Gale (R)
▌4. Melvin Maas (R)
▌5. Oscar Youngdahl (R)
▌6. Harold Knutson (R)
▌7. Herman Carl Andersen (R)
▌8. William Pittenger (R)
▌9. Rich T. Buckler (FL)

==== Mississippi ====
▌1. John E. Rankin (D)
▌2. Wall Doxey (D), until September 28, 1941

▌Jamie L. Whitten (D), from November 4, 1941

▌3. William M. Whittington (D)
▌4. Aaron L. Ford (D)
▌5. Ross A. Collins (D)
▌6. William M. Colmer (D)
▌7. Dan R. McGehee (D)

==== Missouri ====
▌1. Milton A. Romjue (D)
▌2. William L. Nelson (D)
▌3. Richard M. Duncan (D)
▌4. C. Jasper Bell (D)
▌5. Joseph B. Shannon (D)
▌6. Philip A. Bennett (R), until December 7, 1942
▌7. Dewey Short (R)
▌8. Clyde Williams (D)
▌9. Clarence Cannon (D)
▌10. Orville Zimmerman (D)
▌11. John B. Sullivan (D)
▌12. Walter C. Ploeser (R)
▌13. John J. Cochran (D)

==== Montana ====
▌1. Jeannette Rankin (R)
▌2. James F. O'Connor (D)

==== Nebraska ====
▌1. Oren S. Copeland (R)
▌2. Charles F. McLaughlin (D)
▌3. Karl Stefan (R)
▌4. Carl Curtis (R)
▌5. Harry B. Coffee (D)

==== Nevada ====
▌At-large. James G. Scrugham (D), until December 7, 1942

==== New Hampshire ====
▌1. Arthur B. Jenks (R)
▌2. Foster Waterman Stearns (R)

==== New Jersey ====
▌1. Charles A. Wolverton (R)
▌2. Elmer H. Wene (D)
▌3. William H. Sutphin (D)
▌4. D. Lane Powers (R)
▌5. Charles A. Eaton (R)
▌6. Donald H. McLean (R)
▌7. J. Parnell Thomas (R)
▌8. Gordon Canfield (R)
▌9. Frank C. Osmers Jr. (R)
▌10. Fred A. Hartley Jr. (R)
▌11. Albert L. Vreeland (R)
▌12. Robert Kean (R)
▌13. Mary T. Norton (D)
▌14. Edward J. Hart (D)

==== New Mexico ====
▌At-large. Clinton P. Anderson (D)

==== New York ====
▌1. Leonard W. Hall (R)
▌2. William B. Barry (D)
▌3. Joseph L. Pfeifer (D)
▌4. Thomas H. Cullen (D)
▌5. James J. Heffernan (D)
▌6. Andrew L. Somers (D)
▌7. John J. Delaney (D)
▌8. Donald L. O'Toole (D)
▌9. Eugene J. Keogh (D)
▌10. Emanuel Celler (D)
▌11. James A. O'Leary (D)
▌12. Samuel Dickstein (D)
▌13. Louis Capozzoli (D)
▌14. Morris Michael Edelstein (D), until June 4, 1941

▌Arthur George Klein (D), from July 29, 1941

▌15. Michael J. Kennedy (D)
▌16. William T. Pheiffer (R)
▌17. Kenneth F. Simpson (R), until January 25, 1941

▌Joseph C. Baldwin (R), from March 11, 1941

▌18. Martin J. Kennedy (D)
▌19. Sol Bloom (D)
▌20. Vito Marcantonio (AL)
▌21. Joseph A. Gavagan (D)
▌22. Walter A. Lynch (D)
▌23. Charles A. Buckley (D)
▌24. James M. Fitzpatrick (D)
▌25. Ralph A. Gamble (R)
▌26. Hamilton Fish III (R)
▌27. Lewis K. Rockefeller (R)
▌28. William T. Byrne (D)
▌29. E. Harold Cluett (R)
▌30. Frank Crowther (R)
▌31. Clarence E. Kilburn (R)
▌32. Francis D. Culkin (R)
▌33. Fred J. Douglas (R)
▌34. Edwin Arthur Hall (R)
▌35. Clarence E. Hancock (R)
▌36. John Taber (R)
▌37. W. Sterling Cole (R)
▌38. Joseph J. O'Brien (R)
▌39. James W. Wadsworth Jr. (R)
▌40. Walter G. Andrews (R)
▌41. Alfred F. Beiter (D)
▌42. Pius Schwert (D), until March 11, 1941

▌John Cornelius Butler (R), from April 22, 1941

▌43. Daniel A. Reed (R)
▌At-large. Matthew J. Merritt (D)
▌At-large. Caroline O'Day (D)

==== North Carolina ====
▌1. Herbert Covington Bonner (D)
▌2. John H. Kerr (D)
▌3. Graham A. Barden (D)
▌4. Harold D. Cooley (D)
▌5. Alonzo D. Folger (D), until April 30, 1941

▌John Hamlin Folger (D), from June 14, 1941

▌6. Carl T. Durham (D)
▌7. J. Bayard Clark (D)
▌8. William O. Burgin (D)
▌9. Robert L. Doughton (D)
▌10. Alfred L. Bulwinkle (D)
▌11. Zebulon Weaver (D)

==== North Dakota ====
▌At-large. Charles R. Robertson (R)
▌At-large. Usher L. Burdick (R-NPL)

==== Ohio ====
▌1. Charles H. Elston (R)
▌2. William E. Hess (R)
▌3. Greg J. Holbrock (D)
▌4. Robert Franklin Jones (R)
▌5. Cliff Clevenger (R)
▌6. Jacob E. Davis (D)
▌7. Clarence J. Brown (R)
▌8. Frederick Cleveland Smith (R)
▌9. John F. Hunter (D)
▌10. Thomas A. Jenkins (R)
▌11. Harold K. Claypool (D)
▌12. John M. Vorys (R)
▌13. Albert David Baumhart Jr. (R), until September 2, 1942
▌14. Dow W. Harter (D)
▌15. Robert T. Secrest (D), until August 3, 1942
▌16. William R. Thom (D)
▌17. J. Harry McGregor (R)
▌18. Lawrence E. Imhoff (D)
▌19. Michael J. Kirwan (D)
▌20. Martin L. Sweeney (D)
▌21. Robert Crosser (D)
▌22. Frances P. Bolton (R)
▌At-large. George H. Bender (R)
▌At-large. Stephen M. Young (D)

==== Oklahoma ====
▌1. Wesley E. Disney (D)
▌2. John Conover Nichols (D)
▌3. Wilburn Cartwright (D)
▌4. Lyle Boren (D)
▌5. A. S. Mike Monroney (D)
▌6. Jed J. Johnson (D)
▌7. Sam C. Massingale (D), until January 17, 1941

▌Victor Wickersham (D), from April 1, 1941

▌8. Ross Rizley (R)
▌At-large. Will Rogers (D)

==== Oregon ====
▌1. James W. Mott (R)
▌2. Walter M. Pierce (D)
▌3. Homer D. Angell (R)

==== Pennsylvania ====
▌1. Leon Sacks (D)
▌2. James P. McGranery (D)
▌3. Michael J. Bradley (D)
▌4. John E. Sheridan (D)
▌5. Francis R. Smith (D)
▌6. Francis J. Myers (D)
▌7. Hugh Scott (R)
▌8. James Wolfenden (R)
▌9. Charles L. Gerlach (R)
▌10. J. Roland Kinzer (R)
▌11. Patrick J. Boland (D), until May 18, 1942

▌Veronica Grace Boland (D), from November 3, 1942

▌12. J. Harold Flannery (D), until January 3, 1942

▌Thomas B. Miller (R), from May 19, 1942

▌13. Ivor D. Fenton (R)
▌14. Guy L. Moser (D)
▌15. Albert G. Rutherford (R), until August 10, 1941

▌Wilson D. Gillette (R), from November 4, 1941

▌16. Robert F. Rich (R)
▌17. J. William Ditter (R)
▌18. Richard M. Simpson (R)
▌19. John C. Kunkel (R)
▌20. Benjamin Jarrett (R)
▌21. Francis E. Walter (D)
▌22. Harry L. Haines (D)
▌23. James E. Van Zandt (R)
▌24. J. Buell Snyder (D)
▌25. Charles I. Faddis (D), until December 4, 1942
▌26. Louis E. Graham (R)
▌27. Harve Tibbott (R)
▌28. Augustine B. Kelley (D)
▌29. Robert L. Rodgers (R)
▌30. Thomas E. Scanlon (D)
▌31. Samuel A. Weiss (D)
▌32. Herman P. Eberharter (D)
▌33. Joseph A. McArdle (D), until January 5, 1942

▌Elmer J. Holland (D), from May 19, 1942

▌34. James A. Wright (D)

==== Rhode Island ====
▌1. Aime Forand (D)
▌2. John E. Fogarty (D)

==== South Carolina ====
▌1. L. Mendel Rivers (D)
▌2. Hampton P. Fulmer (D)
▌3. Butler B. Hare (D)
▌4. Joseph R. Bryson (D)
▌5. James P. Richards (D)
▌6. John L. McMillan (D)

==== South Dakota ====
▌1. Karl E. Mundt (R)
▌2. Francis Case (R)

==== Tennessee ====
▌1. B. Carroll Reece (R)
▌2. John Jennings Jr. (R)
▌3. Estes Kefauver (D)
▌4. Albert Gore Sr. (D)
▌5. Percy Priest (D)
▌6. W. Wirt Courtney (D)
▌7. Herron C. Pearson (D)
▌8. Jere Cooper (D)
▌9. Clifford Davis (D)

==== Texas ====
▌1. Wright Patman (D)
▌2. Martin Dies Jr. (D)
▌3. Lindley Beckworth (D)
▌4. Sam Rayburn (D)
▌5. Hatton W. Sumners (D)
▌6. Luther Alexander Johnson (D)
▌7. Nat Patton (D)
▌8. Albert Thomas (D)
▌9. Joseph J. Mansfield (D)
▌10. Lyndon B. Johnson (D)
▌11. William R. Poage (D)
▌12. Fritz G. Lanham (D)
▌13. Ed Gossett (D)
▌14. Richard M. Kleberg (D)
▌15. Milton H. West (D)
▌16. R. Ewing Thomason (D)
▌17. Sam M. Russell (D)
▌18. Eugene Worley (D)
▌19. George H. Mahon (D)
▌20. Paul J. Kilday (D)
▌21. Charles L. South (D)

==== Utah ====
▌1. Walter K. Granger (D)
▌2. J. W. Robinson (D)

==== Vermont ====
▌At-large. Charles A. Plumley (R)

==== Virginia ====
▌1. S. Otis Bland (D)
▌2. Colgate W. Darden Jr. (D), until March 1, 1941

▌Winder R. Harris (D), from April 8, 1941

▌3. Dave E. Satterfield Jr. (D)
▌4. Patrick H. Drewry (D)
▌5. Thomas G. Burch (D)
▌6. Clifton A. Woodrum (D)
▌7. A. Willis Robertson (D)
▌8. Howard W. Smith (D)
▌9. John W. Flannagan Jr. (D)

==== Washington ====
▌1. Warren G. Magnuson (D)
▌2. Henry M. Jackson (D)
▌3. Martin F. Smith (D)
▌4. Knute Hill (D)
▌5. Charles H. Leavy (D), until August 1, 1942
▌6. John M. Coffee (D)

==== West Virginia ====
▌1. Robert L. Ramsay (D)
▌2. Jennings Randolph (D)
▌3. Andrew Edmiston Jr. (D)
▌4. George W. Johnson (D)
▌5. John Kee (D)
▌6. Joe L. Smith (D)

==== Wisconsin ====
▌1. Stephen Bolles (R), until July 8, 1941

▌Lawrence H. Smith (R), from August 29, 1941

▌2. Harry Sauthoff (P)
▌3. William H. Stevenson (R)
▌4. Thad F. Wasielewski (D)
▌5. Lewis D. Thill (R)
▌6. Frank Bateman Keefe (R)
▌7. Reid F. Murray (R)
▌8. Joshua L. Johns (R)
▌9. Merlin Hull (P)
▌10. Bernard J. Gehrmann (P)

==== Wyoming ====
▌At-large. John J. McIntyre (D)

==== Non-voting members ====
▌Alaska Territory. Anthony J. Dimond (D)
▌Hawaii Territory. Samuel Wilder King (R)
▌Philippines. Joaquín Miguel Elizalde (I)
▌Puerto Rico. Bolívar Pagán (Soc.)

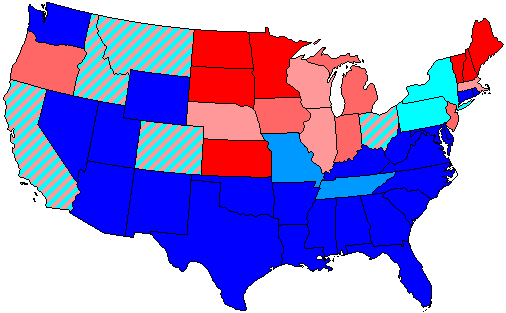
House seats by party holding plurality in state: 80+% Democratic / 80+% Republican; 60+% to 80% Democratic / 60+% to 80% Republican; Up to 60% Democratic / Up to 60% Republican

== Changes in membership ==
The count below reflects changes from the beginning of this Congress.

=== Senate ===
Senate changes
State (class)	Vacated by	Reason for change	Successor	Date of successor's formal installation (Note: When seated or oath administered, not necessarily when service began.)
West Virginia (2)	Matthew M. Neely (D)	Resigned January 12, 1941, after being elected Governor of West Virginia. Successor was appointed to serve until a special election, which he subsequently lost. In addition, successor took oath of office after the Senate resolved a challenge to the appointment.	Joseph Rosier (D)	January 13, 1941
Arkansas (2)	John E. Miller (D)	Resigned March 31, 1941, after being appointed judge for the US District Court for the Western District of Arkansas. Successor was appointed to finish the term.	G. Lloyd Spencer (D)	April 1, 1941
Texas (2)	Morris Sheppard (D)	Died April 9, 1941. Successor was appointed to serve until a special election.	Andrew Jackson Houston (D)	April 21, 1941
Mississippi (2)	Pat Harrison (D)	Died June 22, 1941. Successor was appointed to serve until a special election.	James Eastland (D)	June 30, 1941
Texas (2)	Andrew Jackson Houston (D)	Died June 26, 1941. Successor was elected to finish term.	W. Lee O'Daniel (D)	August 4, 1941
South Carolina (2)	James F. Byrnes (D)	Resigned July 17, 1941, after being appointed Associate Justice of the Supreme Court of the United States. Successor was appointed to serve until a special election.	Alva M. Lumpkin (D)	July 22, 1941
South Carolina (2)	Alva M. Lumpkin (D)	Died August 1, 1941. Successor was appointed to serve until a special election.	Roger C. Peace (D)	August 5, 1941
Mississippi (2)	James Eastland (D)	Appointee did not seek election to finish term. Successor was elected September 28, 1941, to finish term.	Wall Doxey (D)	September 29, 1941
South Carolina (2)	Roger C. Peace (D)	Appointee did not seek election to finish term. Successor was elected November 4, 1941, to finish term.	Burnet R. Maybank (D)	November 5, 1941
Colorado (3)	Alva B. Adams (D)	Died December 1, 1941. Successor was appointed to serve until the November 3, 1942, special election, which he won.	Eugene Millikin (R)	December 20, 1941
West Virginia (2)	Joseph Rosier (D)	Appointee lost election November 17, 1942, to finish the term. Successor was elected to finish term.	Hugh Shott (R)	November 18, 1942
Minnesota (2)	Joseph H. Ball (R)	Appointee did not seek election to finish term. Successor was elected November 17, 1942, to finish term.	Arthur E. Nelson (R)	November 18, 1942
Nevada (1)	Berkeley L. Bunker (D)	Appointee lost election December 7, 1942, to finish the term. Successor was elected to finish term.	James G. Scrugham (D)	December 7, 1942

=== House of Representatives ===
House changes
District	Vacated by	Reason for change	Successor	Date of successor's formal installation
Oklahoma 7th	Sam C. Massingale (D)	Died January 17, 1941	Victor Wickersham (D)	April 1, 1941
New York 17th	Kenneth F. Simpson (R)	Died January 25, 1941	Joseph C. Baldwin (R)	March 11, 1941
Alabama 7th	Walter W. Bankhead (D)	Resigned February 1, 1941	Carter Manasco (D)	June 24, 1941
Maryland 6th	William D. Byron (D)	Died February 27, 1941	Katharine Byron (D)	May 27, 1941
Virginia 2nd	Colgate Darden (D)	Resigned March 1, 1941, to run for Governor of Virginia	Winder R. Harris (D)	April 8, 1941
New York 42nd	Pius L. Schwert (D)	Died March 11, 1941	John C. Butler (R)	April 22, 1941
North Carolina 5th	Alonzo D. Folger (D)	Died April 30, 1941	John H. Folger (D)	June 14, 1941
New York 14th	Morris M. Edelstein (D)	Died June 4, 1941	Arthur G. Klein (D)	July 29, 1941
Wisconsin 1st	Stephen Bolles (R)	Died July 8, 1941	Lawrence H. Smith (R)	August 29, 1941
Pennsylvania 15th	Albert G. Rutherford (R)	Died August 10, 1941	Wilson D. Gillette (R)	November 4, 1941
Colorado 4th	Edward T. Taylor (D)	Died September 3, 1941	Robert F. Rockwell (R)	December 9, 1941
Mississippi 2nd	Wall Doxey (D)	Resigned September 28, 1941, after being elected to the US Senate	Jamie L. Whitten (D)	November 4, 1941
California 17th	Lee E. Geyer (D)	Died October 11, 1941	Cecil R. King (D)	August 25, 1942
Massachusetts 7th	Lawrence J. Connery (D)	Died October 19, 1941	Thomas J. Lane (D)	December 30, 1941
Connecticut 5th	J. Joseph Smith (D)	Resigned November 4, 1941, after being appointed judge for the United States District Court for the District of Connecticut	Joseph E. Talbot (R)	January 20, 1942
Pennsylvania 12th	J. Harold Flannery (D)	Resigned January 3, 1942, after becoming judge of common pleas for Luzerne County, PA	Thomas B. Miller (R)	May 19, 1942
Pennsylvania 33rd	Joseph A. McArdle (D)	Resigned January 5, 1942, after being elected to the Pittsburgh City Council	Elmer J. Holland (D)	May 19, 1942
Pennsylvania 11th	Patrick J. Boland (D)	Died May 18, 1942	Veronica G. Boland (D)	November 3, 1942
Washington 5th	Arthur D. Healey (D)	Resigned August 1, 1942, after being appointed judge for the United States District Court for the Western District of Washington	Vacant until the next Congress	
Massachusetts 8th	Charles H. Leavy (D)	Resigned August 3, 1942, after being appointed judge for the United States District Court for the District of Massachusetts	Vacant until the next Congress	
Ohio 15th	Robert T. Secrest (D)	Resigned August 3, 1942, after accepting a commission in the U.S. Navy	Vacant until the next Congress	
Ohio 13th	Albert D. Baumhart Jr. (R)	Resigned September 2, 1942, after accepting a commission in the U.S. Navy	Vacant until the next Congress	
Iowa 9th	Vincent F. Harrington (D)	Resigned September 5, 1942, after accepting a commission as major in the United States Army	Harry E. Narey (R)	November 3, 1942
California 3rd	Frank H. Buck (D)	Died September 17, 1942	Vacant until the next Congress	
Maryland 2nd	William Purington Cole Jr. (D)	Resigned October 26, 1942, after being appointed judge for the U.S. Customs Court	Vacant until the next Congress	
Pennsylvania 25th	Charles I. Faddis (D)	Resigned December 4, 1942, to enter the US Army	Vacant until the next Congress	
Illinois 4th	Harry P. Beam (D)	Resigned December 6, 1942, after being elected judge for the municipal court of Chicago	Vacant until the next Congress	
Illinois 6th	A. F. Maciejewski (D)	Resigned December 6, 1942	Vacant until the next Congress	
Missouri 6th	Philip A. Bennett (R)	Died December 7, 1942	Vacant until the next Congress	
Nevada at-large	James G. Scrugham (D)	Resigned December 7, 1942, after being elected to the U.S. Senate	Vacant until the next Congress	

== Committees ==
Lists of committees and their party leaders for members of the House and Senate committees can be found through the Official Congressional Directory at the bottom of this article. The directory after the pages of terms of service lists committees of the Senate, House (Standing with Subcommittees, Select and Special) and Joint and, after that, House/Senate committee assignments. On the committees section of the House and Senate in the Official Congressional Directory, the committee's members on the first row on the left side shows the chairman of the committee and on the right side shows the ranking member of the committee.

=== Senate ===
- Agriculture and Forestry (Chairman: Ellison D. Smith; Ranking Member: George W. Norris)
- Agricultural Labor Shortages in the West (Special)
- Appropriations (Chairman: Carter Glass; Ranking Member: Gerald P. Nye)
- Audit and Control the Contingent Expenses of the Senate (Chairman: Scott W. Lucas; Ranking Member: N/A)
- Banking and Currency (Chairman: Robert F. Wagner; Ranking Member: Charles W. Tobey)
- Civil Service (Chairman: William J. Bulow; Ranking Member: Wallace H. White Jr.)
- Civil Service Laws (Special)
- Claims (Chairman: Prentiss M. Brown; Ranking Member: Arthur Capper)
- Commerce (Chairman: Josiah W. Bailey; Ranking Member: Charles L. McNary)
- District of Columbia (Chairman: Pat McCarran; Ranking Member: Arthur Capper)
- Education and Labor (Chairman: Elbert D. Thomas; Ranking Member: Robert M. La Follette Jr.)
- Enrolled Bills (Chairman: Hattie W. Caraway; Ranking Member: Clyde M. Reed)
- Expenditures in Executive Departments (Chairman: J. Lister Hill; Ranking Member: James J. Davis)
- Finance (Chairman: Walter F. George; Ranking Member: Robert M. La Follette Jr.)
- Foreign Relations (Chairman: Tom Connally; Ranking Member: Hiram W. Johnson)
- Fiscal Affairs of the Government (Special)
- Fuel Situation in the Middle West (Special)
- [mFuels in the Areas West of the Mississippi (Special)
- Gasoline and Fuel Oil Shortages (Special)
- Immigration (Chairman: Richard B. Russell; Ranking Member: Hiram W. Johnson)
- Indian Affairs (Chairman: Elmer Thomas; Ranking Member: Robert M. La Follette Jr.)
- Interoceanic Canals (Chairman: Bennett Champ Clark; Ranking Member: Styles Bridges)
- Interstate Commerce (Chairman: Burton K. Wheeler; Ranking Member: Wallace H. White Jr.)
- Investigate the National Defense Program (Special)
- Irrigation and Reclamation (Chairman: John H. Bankhead II; Ranking Member: Charles L. McNary)
- Judiciary (Chairman: Frederick Van Nuys; Ranking Member: George W. Norris)
- Library (Chairman: Alben W. Barkley; Ranking Member: Charles L. McNary)
- Manufactures (Chairman: John H. Overton; Ranking Member: Robert M. La Follette Jr.)
- Military Affairs (Chairman: Robert R. Reynolds; Ranking Member: Warren R. Austin)
- Mines and Mining (Chairman: Joseph F. Guffey; Ranking Member: James J. Davis)
- Naval Affairs (Chairman: David I. Walsh; Ranking Member: James J. Davis)
- Old-Age Pension System (Select)
- Patents (Chairman: Homer T. Bone; Ranking Member: Wallace H. White Jr.)
- Pensions (Chairman: Henry H. Schwartz; Ranking Member: Henrik Shipstead)
- Post Office and Post Roads (Chairman: Kenneth McKellar; Ranking Member: Robert M. La Follette Jr.)
- Printing (Chairman: Carl Hayden; Ranking Member: Chan Gurney)
- Privileges and Elections (Chairman: Theodore F. Green; Ranking Member: Warren R. Austin)
- Public Buildings and Grounds (Chairman: Francis Maloney; Ranking Member: W. Warren Barbour)
- Public Lands and Surveys (Chairman: Carl A. Hatch; Ranking Member: Gerald P. Nye)
- Rules (Chairman: Harry F. Byrd; Ranking Member: Arthur H. Vandenberg)
- Senatorial Campaign Expenditures (Special) (Chairman: Guy M. Gillette)
- Small Business Enterprises (Special) (Chairman: James E. Murray)
- Territories and Insular Affairs (Chairman: Millard E. Tydings; Ranking Member: Gerald P. Nye)
- Whole
- Wildlife Resources (Special) (Chairman: Bennett Champ Clark)
- Wool Production (Special) (Chairman: Alva B. Adams)

=== House of Representatives ===
- Accounts (Chairman: John J. Cochran; Ranking Member: James Wolfenden)
- Agriculture (Chairman: Hampton P. Fulmer; Ranking Member: Clifford R. Hope)
- Air Accidents (Select) (Chairman: Jack Nichols)
- Appropriations (Chairman: Clarence Cannon; Ranking Member: John Taber)
- Banking and Currency (Chairman: Henry B. Steagall; Ranking Member: Jesse P. Wolcott)
- Census (Chairman: Guy L. Moser; Ranking Member: J. Roland Kinzer)
- Civil Service (Chairman: Robert Ramspeck; Ranking Member: Edith Nourse Rogers)
- Claims (Chairman: Dan R. McGehee; Ranking Member: J. Parnell Thomas)
- Coinage, Weights and Measures (Chairman: Andrew Somers; Ranking Member: Chauncey W. Reed)
- Conservation of Wildlife Resources (Select) (Chairman: A. Willis Robertson)
- Disposition of Executive Papers (Chairman: Alfred J. Elliott; Ranking Member: Bertrand W. Gearhart)
- District of Columbia (Chairman: Jennings Randolph; Ranking Member: Everett M. Dirksen)
- Education (Chairman: William H. Larrabee; Ranking Member: George A. Dondero)
- Election of the President, Vice President and Representatives in Congress (Chairman: Caroline O'Day; Ranking Member: George H. Tinkham)
- Elections No.#1 (Chairman: C. Jasper Bell; Ranking Member: Clarence E. Hancock)
- Elections No.#2 (Chairman: Joseph A. Gavagan; Ranking Member: Francis D. Culkin)
- Elections No.#3 (Chairman: Albert Thomas; Ranking Member: Charles A. Plumley)
- Enrolled Bills (Chairman: Michael J. Kirwan; Ranking Member: Charles Aubrey Eaton)
- Expenditures in the Executive Departments (Chairman: James A. O'Leary; Ranking Member: Charles L. Gifford)
- Flood Control (Chairman: William M. Whittington; Ranking Member: Harry Lane Englebright)
- Foreign Affairs (Chairman: Sol Bloom; Ranking Member: Hamilton Fish III)
- Immigration and Naturalization (Chairman: Samuel Dickstein; Ranking Member: Noah M. Mason)
- Indian Affairs (Chairman: Will Rogers; Ranking Member: Fred C. Gilchrist)
- Insular Affairs (Chairman: Leo Kocialkowski; Ranking Member: Richard J. Welch)
- Interstate and Foreign Commerce (Chairman: Clarence F. Lea; Ranking Member: Charles A. Wolverton)
- Investigate National Defense Migration (Select) (Chairman: N/A; Ranking Member: N/A)
- Invalid Pensions (Chairman: John Lesinski; Ranking Member: Robert F. Jones)
- Irrigation and Reclamation (Chairman: Compton I. White; Ranking Member: Dewey Jackson Short)
- Judiciary (Chairman: Hatton W. Sumners; Ranking Member: Ulysses S. Guyer)
- Labor (Chairman: Mary Teresa Norton; Ranking Member: Richard J. Welch)
- Library (Chairman: N/A; Ranking Member: Allen T. Treadway)
- Memorials (Chairman: Harry P. Beam; Ranking Member: Frank Crowther)
- Merchant Marine and Fisheries (Chairman: S. Otis Bland; Ranking Member: Richard J. Welch)
- Military Affairs (Chairman: Andrew J. May; Ranking Member: Walter G. Andrews)
- Mines and Mining (Chairman: Joe L. Smith; Ranking Member: Harry Lane Englebright)
- Naval Affairs (Chairman: Carl Vinson; Ranking Member: Melvin J. Maas)
- Patents (Chairman: Charles Kramer; Ranking Member: Fred A. Hartley Jr.)
- Pensions (Chairman: Martin F. Smith; Ranking Member: Fred J. Douglas)
- Post Office and Post Roads (Chairman: Milton A. Romjue; Ranking Member: Fred A. Hartley Jr.)
- Public Buildings and Grounds (Chairman: Fritz G. Lanham; Ranking Member: Pehr G. Holmes)
- Public Lands (Chairman: Martin F. Smith; Ranking Member: Harry Lane Englebright)
- Revision of Laws (Chairman: Milton A. Romjue; Ranking Member: Earl C. Michener)
- Rivers and Harbors (Chairman: J.W. Robinson; Ranking Member: Albert E. Carter)
- Roads (Chairman: Wilburn Cartwright; Ranking Member: Jesse P. Wolcott)
- Rules (Chairman: Adolph J. Sabath; Ranking Member: Hamilton Fish III)
- Small Business (Select)
- Standards of Official Conduct
- Territories (Chairman: Robert A. Green; Ranking Member: Lewis K. Rockefeller)
- War Claims (Chairman: Joseph A. Gavagan; Ranking Member: Clare E. Hoffman)
- Ways and Means (Chairman: Robert L. Doughton; Ranking Member: Allen T. Treadway)
- World War Veterans' Legislation (Chairman: John E. Rankin; Ranking Member: Edith Nourse Rogers)
- Whole

=== Joint committees ===
- United States Congress Joint Committee to Arrange the Inauguration for President-elect|Arrange the Inauguration for President-elect (Chairman: Sen. Matthew M. Neely)
- Conditions of Indian Tribes (Special)
- United States Congress Joint Committee on the Disposition of Executive Papers|Disposition of (Useless) Executive Papers
- United States Congress Joint Committee on the Eradication of the Mediterranean Fruit Fly|Eradication of the Mediterranean Fruit Fly
- Forestry (Chairman: Sen. John H. Bankhead II; Vice Chairman: Rep. Hampton P. Fulmer)
- United States Congress Joint Committee on Government Organization (Chairman: Sen. James F. Byrnes)
- The Library (Chairman: Sen. Alben W. Barkley)
- Printing (Chairman: Sen. Carl Hayden; Vice Chairman: Rep. Pete Jarman)
- United States Congress Joint Committee on Reduction of Nonessential Federal Expenditures|Reduction of Nonessential Federal Expenditures
- Taxation (Chairman: Sen. Pat Harrison then Rep. Robert L. Doughton; Vice Chairman: Sen. Walter F. George)
- United States Congress Joint Committee on to Investigate Phosphate Resource of the United States|To Investigate Phosphate Resource of the United States (Chairman: J. Hardin Peterson)

== Caucuses ==
- Democratic (House)
- Democratic (Senate)

== Employees ==
=== Legislative branch agency directors ===
- Architect of the Capitol: David Lynn
- Attending Physician of the United States Congress: George Calver
- Comptroller General of the United States: Lindsay C. Warren
- Librarian of Congress: Archibald MacLeish
- Public Printer of the United States: Augustus E. Giegengack

=== Senate ===
- Secretary: Edwin A. Halsey
- Librarian: Ruskin McArdle
- Secretary for the Majority: Leslie Biffle
- Secretary for the Minority: Carl A. Loeffler
- Sergeant at Arms: Chesley W. Jurney
- Parliamentarian: Charles Watkins
- Chaplain: ZeBarney Thorne Phillips (Episcopal), until May 1942
  - Frederick Brown Harris (Methodist), after October 10, 1942

=== House of Representatives ===
- Clerk: South Trimble
- Sergeant at Arms: Kenneth Romney
- Parliamentarian: Lewis Deschler
- Reading Clerks: Roger M. Calloway (D) and Alney E. Chaffee (R)
- Doorkeeper: Joseph J. Sinnott
- Postmaster: Finis E. Scott
- Chaplain: James Shera Montgomery (Methodist)

== See also ==
- 1940 United States elections (elections leading to this Congress)
  - 1940 United States presidential election
  - 1940 United States Senate elections
  - 1940 United States House of Representatives elections
- 1942 United States elections (elections during this Congress, leading to the next Congress)
  - 1942 United States Senate elections
  - 1942 United States House of Representatives elections
