= Narey =

Narey is a surname. Notable people with the surname include:

- David Narey, MBE (born 1956), former Scottish international footballer
- Harry E. Narey (1885–1962), Republican U.S. Representative from Iowa
- Martin Narey (born 1955), the CEO of Barnardo's
