= Martha Gibbons Thomas =

American politician (1869–1942)

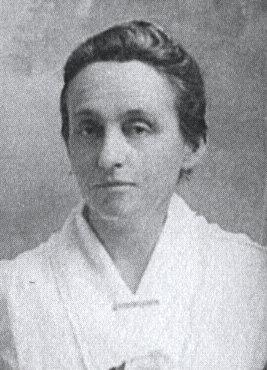

Member of the Pennsylvania House of Representatives from the 2nd district
- In office 1923–1926

Personal details
- Born: February 13, 1869 Whitford, Pennsylvania, US
- Died: June 26, 1942 (aged 73) West Chester, Pennsylvania
- Party: Republican
- Education: Bryn Mawr College (BA)
- Occupation: Politician, suffragist, farmer

Martha Gibbons Thomas (February 13, 1869 – June 26, 1942) was an American politician, suffragist, and dairy farmer from Chester County. She became one of the first women elected to the Pennsylvania House of Representatives, belonging to a cohort of eight women representatives elected in 1922. Thomas won reelection in 1924. She did not seek a third term.

== Early life and education ==
Thomas was born on February 13, 1869, to parents J. Preston Thomas and Hannah J. Gibbons in Whitford, Chester County, Pennsylvania. Her father was a prosperous farmer and civic leader who held numerous local offices, including president of the Bank of Chester County, director of the Poor of Chester County, a co-founder of Chester County Hospital, and a trustee of the West Chester State Normal School and Haverford College. Martha Thomas grew up on farms, including Whitford Farm, which William Penn had granted to her Quaker ancestors eight generations earlier and which her father had reacquired in 1885.

Completing her secondary education via homeschooling, Thomas attended Bryn Mawr College, where she studied chemistry and biology. In 1889, she received her Bachelor of Arts (AB) degree as one of the college's first graduating class. She worked as warden of Pembroke Residence Hall at Bryn Mawr from 1896 to 1914 and took graduate coursework in English and history. She also served as an officer and eventually on the board of directors of the college's alumni association.

== Civic and political career ==
Over two decades, Thomas became active in the women's suffrage movement and other civic organizations, chairing the Women's Committee of the Council of National Defense for Chester County from 1917 to 1919. She served as a trustee of Chester County Hospital and the Pennsylvania School of Horticulture for Women. In addition to her civic duties, she became a Guernsey cattle breeder in partnership with her sister, Anna Thomas Howell. She established the 200-acre Whitford Farm (the sisters inherited after their father's death in 1905) as the first in the area with a federally accredited dairy herd. She joined the American Guernsey Cattle Club in 1915 and registered her first cattle with the Club in 1912.

Thomas served as the Pennsylvania League of Women Voters treasurer when she won her first election to the Pennsylvania House of Representatives in 1922. She continued to serve as the League's treasurer during her first term. She was the first woman to introduce House legislation (a bill to codify child welfare laws). She sponsored a bill that made the state eligible to receive matching federal funds to promote maternal and infant welfare. Her legislative goals focused on support for agriculture and public health. Reelected in 1924, she opted not to run for a third time in 1926. A Republican, she was the first woman to represent Chester County in the state assembly.

Following her departure from elected office, Thomas remained one of Chester County's best known philanthropists and civic leaders. In 1926, she served as hostess of the Sesquicentennial International Exposition, which celebrated the 150th anniversary of the Declaration of independence in Philadelphia. She was a founder of the Chester County Health and Welfare Council, a trustee at Bryn Mawr and West Chester State Teachers College, and a leader in the Girl Scouts and Chester County Library.

Thomas served as president of the Women's Republican Club of Chester County from 1930 to 1942. In 1934, she became associate campaign chair for the Republican gubernatorial nominee William Schnader, rallying support among women. Schnader lost the 1934 Pennsylvania gubernatorial election to Democrat George Earle.

== Personal life and death ==
Thomas died in West Chester on June 26, 1942. She was buried at the Downingtown Friends Meetinghouse Cemetery, Downingtown, Pennsylvania.

She left no spouse or children and was survived by her sister and only sibling, Anna Thomas Howell.
