= Paul B. Dague =

American politician

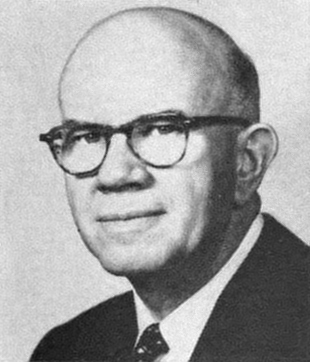

Member of the U.S. House of Representatives from Pennsylvania's 9th district
- In office January 3, 1947 – December 30, 1966
- Preceded by: J. Roland Kinzer
- Succeeded by: George Watkins

Personal details
- Born: May 19, 1898 Whitford, Pennsylvania, U.S.
- Died: December 2, 1974 (aged 76) West Chester, Pennsylvania, U.S.
- Party: Republican

Paul Bartram Dague (May 19, 1898 – December 2, 1974) was a Republican member of the U.S. House of Representatives from Pennsylvania.

== Biography ==
Paul Dague was born in Whitford, Pennsylvania. He took special studies at West Chester State Teachers College and studied electrical engineering at Drexel Institute in Philadelphia, Pennsylvania. He was a member of the United States Marine Corps during World War I serving from 1918 to 1919. He served as assistant superintendent of the Pennsylvania Department of Highways from 1925 to 1935. He served as deputy sheriff of Chester County, Pennsylvania, 1936–1943, and sheriff of Chester County from 1944 to 1946.

He was elected in 1946 as a Republican to the 80th United States Congress and served until his resignation on December 30, 1966. He was not a candidate for reelection to the 90th United States Congress in 1966. Dague's 20 years in the House continued the Republican domination of the district, following his predecessor's 17 years. Dague's departure was in part precipitated by the court-ordered necessity to divide the two-county district.

Dague served on the Agriculture Committee since his first year in the House, finally rising to ranking Republican in his last term. He voted in favor of the Civil Rights Acts of 1957, 1960, and 1964, as well as the 24th Amendment to the U.S. Constitution and the Voting Rights Act of 1965.

U.S. House of Representatives
Preceded by J. Roland Kinzer	Member of the U.S. House of Representatives from Pennsylvania's 9th congressional district 1947–1966	Succeeded by G. Robert Watkins
