= Veronica Grace Boland =

American politician (1899–1982)

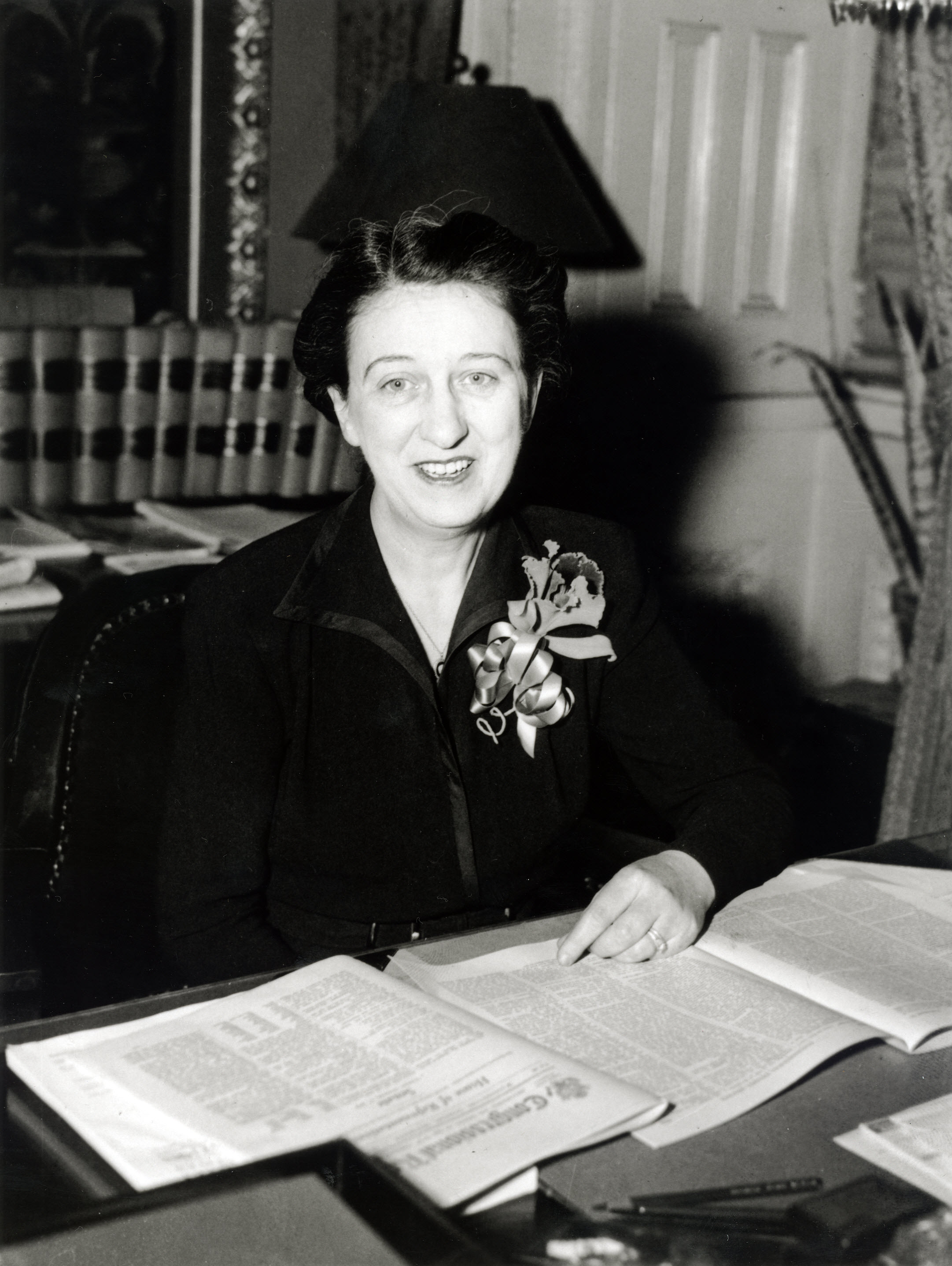

Member of the U.S. House of Representatives from Pennsylvania's 11th district
- In office November 3, 1942 – January 3, 1943
- Preceded by: Patrick J. Boland
- Succeeded by: John W. Murphy

Personal details
- Born: Veronica Grace Barrett; March 18, 1899 Scranton, Pennsylvania, U.S.
- Died: June 19, 1982 (aged 83) Scranton, Pennsylvania, U.S.
- Party: Democratic
- Spouse: Patrick J. Boland
- Parent(s): Patrick and Winifred Barrett

Veronica Grace Boland (née Barrett; March 18, 1899 – June 19, 1982) was the first woman from Pennsylvania to serve in the United States Congress. A Democrat, she served in the U.S. House of Representatives during the 77th United States Congress.

== Formative years ==
Born in Scranton, Pennsylvania, on March 18, 1899, Veronica Grace Barrett was a daughter of Patrick and Winifred Barrett, who had emigrated from Ireland. She married Patrick J. Boland.

She was educated in the public schools of her community at the Scranton Technical High School.

== Political career and later life ==
Veronica Boland was elected as a Democrat to the Seventy-seventh Congress, by special election, to fill the vacancy caused by the May 18, 1942 heart attack-related death of her husband on the morning before he would have won the Pennsylvania primary election (a victory which would have sent him to the U.S House for a second term). Urged by leaders of the Democratic Party to fill her husband's seat, she ran unopposed and won the seat on November 3 of that year, during the first congressional elections to be held following America's entry into World War II.

Sworn in on November 19, 1942, she represented Pennsylvania's 11th District only until Congress adjourned its 77th session on December 16, 1942, choosing to retire rather than become a candidate for reelection in 1942.

After returning to Scranton, she worked as an executive secretary for the Dutch Manufacturing Company, but retired from that position in 1957 when health issues required that she undergo eye surgery.

== Death and interment ==
Boland died at her home in Scranton on June 19, 1982 after a short illness. She is buried at that city's Cathedral Cemetery.

== See also ==
- Women in the United States House of Representatives

U.S. House of Representatives
Preceded by Patrick J. Boland	Member of the U.S. House of Representatives from Pennsylvania's 11th congressional district 1942–1943	Succeeded by John W. Murphy
