= Albert Leisenring Watson =

American judge (1876–1960)

Senior Judge of the United States District Court for the Middle District of Pennsylvania
- In office May 31, 1955 – December 20, 1960

Chief Judge of the United States District Court for the Middle District of Pennsylvania
- In office 1948–1955
- Preceded by: Office established
- Succeeded by: John W. Murphy

Judge of the United States District Court for the Middle District of Pennsylvania
- In office December 17, 1929 – May 31, 1955
- Appointed by: Herbert Hoover
- Preceded by: Seat established by 45 Stat. 1344
- Succeeded by: Seat abolished

Personal details
- Born: Albert Leisenring Watson; December 6, 1876 Montrose, Pennsylvania, U.S.
- Died: December 20, 1960 (aged 84)
- Spouse: Effie Woodville (m. 1930)
- Education: Amherst College (A.B.) read law

Albert Leisenring Watson (December 6, 1876 – December 20, 1960) was a United States district judge of the United States District Court for the Middle District of Pennsylvania.

== Early life ==
Watson was born in Montrose, Pennsylvania, on December 6, 1876. His father was Willoughby W. Watson, who practiced law for 50 years in Susquehanna County and Lackawanna County. His mother was Marie Kemmerer Watson.

== Education and early career ==
Watson received an Artium Baccalaureus degree from Amherst College in 1901 and read law in 1903 to enter the bar. He was in private practice in Scranton, Pennsylvania from 1903 to 1925. He was a Judge of the Court of Common Pleas for Lackawanna County, Pennsylvania from 1926 to 1928. He was also a trustee of the Scranton State Hospital and became president of the board in 1923.

== Federal judicial service ==
=== Nomination ===
On September 9, 1929, Watson was nominated by President Herbert Hoover to a new seat on the United States District Court for the Middle District of Pennsylvania created by 45 Stat. 1344. He was confirmed by the United States Senate on December 17, 1929, and received his commission the same day. He served as Chief Judge from 1948 to 1955, assuming senior status on May 31, 1955. He served in that capacity until his death on December 20, 1960.

=== Trial of the Scoblick brothers ===
In January 1953, James P. Scoblick and two of his brothers were indicted in a check kiting scheme involving their fruit-processing business, Scoblick Bros. Inc. All three were convicted on December 3, 1954. Watson sentenced James Scoblick to 5 years in prison.

== Personal life ==
Watson married Effie Woodville in 1930. Together, they had two sons, Albert Jr., and Warren Woodville Watson. Watson died at 12:30 PM on December 20, 1960. Prior to his death, he had been a patient at the Mercy Hospital in Scranton since October 12.

== Sources ==
Legal offices
Preceded by Seat established by 45 Stat. 1344	Judge of the United States District Court for the Middle District of Pennsylvania; 1929–1955	Succeeded by Seat abolished
Preceded by Office established	Chief Judge of the United States District Court for the Middle District of Pennsylvania; 1948–1955	Succeeded by John W. Murphy
