= Vincent F. Harrington =

American politician (1903–1943)

Vincent Francis Harrington
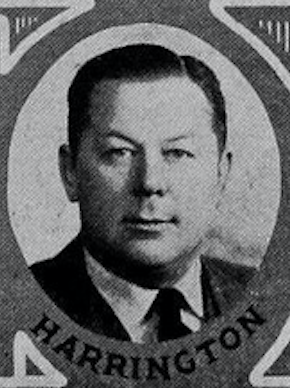

Member of the U.S. House of Representatives from Iowa's 9th district
- In office January 3, 1937 – September 5, 1942
- Preceded by: Guy Gillette
- Succeeded by: Harry E. Narey

Member of the Iowa Senate from the 32nd district
- In office January 9, 1933 – January 2, 1937
- Preceded by: Bertel M. Stoddard
- Succeeded by: Tom Ellis Murray

Personal details
- Born: May 16, 1903 Sioux City, Iowa, U.S.
- Died: November 29, 1943 (aged 40) Rutland, England
- Cause of death: Heart attack
- Resting place: Cambridge American Cemetery, Cambridge, England
- Party: Democratic

Military service
- Branch/service: United States Army
- Years of service: 1942–1943
- Rank: Major
- Unit: IX Troop Carrier Command
- Battles/wars: World War II
- Awards: Legion of Merit

Vincent Francis Harrington (May 16, 1903 – November 29, 1943) was a Democratic U.S. Representative from Iowa. Harrington was commissioned in the United States Army Air Forces after the Pearl Harbor attack, resigned from Congress when President Franklin D. Roosevelt disallowed members of Congress from serving in the military at the same time, and died of natural causes while on active duty in England. A Liberty Ship was named in his honor.

== Personal background ==
Born in Sioux City, Iowa to Thomas F. and Maria Harrington, Vincent Harrington attended Cathedral Grammar School in Sioux City. He then attended Trinity College Academy, a school in Sioux City built on land purchased from Harrington's parents by the Order of St. Francis.

He attended the University of Notre Dame in South Bend, Indiana, where he played football for Knute Rockne, as a second-stringer on the legendary "Four Horsemen" team that dominated all opponents in the 1924 season.

After graduating from Notre Dame in 1925, he served as an instructor and athletic director at Columbia University (now named as the University of Portland) in Portland, Oregon, from 1926 to 1927, where he taught economics and history. He then returned to Sioux City, where he worked with his father at Continental Mortgage Company, serving as treasurer and assistant manager, and later as vice president and general manager.

On June 7, 1927, Harrington married Catherine O'Connor of Homer, Nebraska. Mr. and Mrs. Harrington were the parents of two daughters, Catherine Tim and Patricia Ann Harrington.

== Iowa legislator ==
Harrington served as a member of the Iowa Senate from 1933 to 1937.

== Election to the U.S. House (1936) ==
In June 1936, Harrington won the Democratic nomination for Lieutenant Governor of Iowa. However, the following month, Iowa electoral politics was thrown into disarray when Democratic U.S. Senator Richard Louis Murphy was killed in a car accident. Democratic Congressman Guy M. Gillette of Cherokee, Iowa, a candidate for re-election in Iowa's 9th congressional district, ran instead in the special election to serve out the remainder of Murphy's Senate term. This prompted Harrington, a 9th district resident, to withdraw from the race for Lieutenant Governor to accept the Democratic nomination to replace Gillette on the ballot for the U.S. House of Representatives. In the general election, Harrington defeated Republican Fred B. Wolf by over 10,000 votes.

== Re-elections ==
Harrington was re-elected in 1938 and 1940. However, his re-election wins (both over Republican Albert F. Swanson) were much closer than his original victory. In 1938, he won by only 269 votes out of over 94,000 cast (down from 339 after Swanson challenged Harrington's election and the House disallowed 70 Harrington votes), and in 1940 he won by only 2,140 votes out of over 130,000 cast.

== 1941 reapportionment ==
Iowa lost one of its nine congressional seats following the 1940 census, requiring the Republican-controlled 1941 Iowa General Assembly to divide the state into eight congressional districts. The old 9th congressional district, minus one county, became the new 8th congressional district. The exception was Monona County, which Harrington had carried in 1940 by a thousand-vote margin. When Monona County was placed in the reconfigured 7th congressional district, it was considered a blow to Harrington's chances for re-election in 1942.

In the months before the United States' entry into World War II, Harrington declined to support President Roosevelt's departures from a policy of strict neutrality. In the fall of 1941, Harrington voted against additional funding for the Lend-Lease program, the repeal of the arms embargo, and the repeal of the ban on arming merchant ships. At the time, his support for strict neutrality and split with Roosevelt, whose popularity in Iowa had declined after 1936, likely matched the views of many of his constituents. However, after the Pearl Harbor attack, congressmen with such a voting record would have difficulty keeping their seats.

== Resignation from the House ==
In the 1940 race, he had promised that, if he ever voted for war, he would himself go to war. Thus, after he voted to declare war following the Pearl Harbor attack, he entered in May 1942 in the Army Air Forces, where he was commissioned as a captain, and took a leave of absence from Congress while becoming a candidate for re-election. He declared that "the decision as to my congressional status after January 3, 1943 is entirely up to the people of the district."

However, before the 1942 general election, President Roosevelt issued an order as commander-in-chief that forced members of Congress serving in the military to resign from one position or the other. To abide by his promise to go to war, Harrington resigned from Congress on September 5, 1942.

Because of his resignation, voters in his district were required to cast two votes in the 1942 general election—one to decide who would serve out the final two months of Harrington's term in the Seventy-seventh Congress, and another for a term in the next Congress. Republican Harry E. Narey was elected to serve out Harrington's term in the disbanding 9th congressional district, while Republican Charles B. Hoeven was elected to the seat Harrington had sought for his next term, in the new 8th congressional district.

== Active Air Corps service and death ==
On November 29, 1943, while serving in the Air Corps as a security control officer in Rutland, England, Harrington suffered a fatal heart attack. He was interred in Cambridge American Cemetery, in Cambridge, England.

In July 1944, Mrs. Harrington christened the SS Vincent Harrington, a Liberty Ship named in honor of her husband.

U.S. House of Representatives
Preceded by Guy Gillette	Member of the U.S. House of Representatives from Iowa's 9th congressional district 1937–1942	Succeeded by Harry E. Narey
