= Air Raid Attack Act of 1942 =

United States statute confirming a civil defense at the commencement of World War II

- Long title: An Act to provide protection of persons and property from bombing attacks in the United States, and for other purposes
- Nicknames: Civilian Defense Protection Act of 1942
- Enacted by: the 77th United States Congress
- Effective: January 27, 1942

Citations
- Public law: Pub. L. 77–415
- Statutes at Large: 56 Stat. 19, Chap. 20

Legislative history
- Introduced in the Senate as S. 1936 by Robert Rice Reynolds (D–NC) on December 15, 1941; Committee consideration by Senate Committee on Military Affairs, House Committee on Military Affairs; Passed the Senate on December 19, 1941 (Passed); Passed the House on January 8, 1942 (187-169, in lieu of H.R. 5727); Reported by the joint conference committee on January 10, 1942; agreed to by the House on January 19, 1942 (335-2) and by the Senate on January 19, 1942 (Agreed); Signed into law by President Franklin D. Roosevelt on January 27, 1942

Air Raid Attack Act of 1942 was a United States federal statute authorizing the United States civil defense to protect Americans and property from bombing attacks, sabotage, and war hazards upon the United States entry into World War II. The Act of Congress established Civilian Defense regulations prohibiting the obstruction of the duties and rights of local districts, municipals, counties, and State officials.

Senate Bill 1936 was passed by the 77th United States Congressional Session and enacted into law by President Franklin Roosevelt on January 27, 1942.

== Origins ==
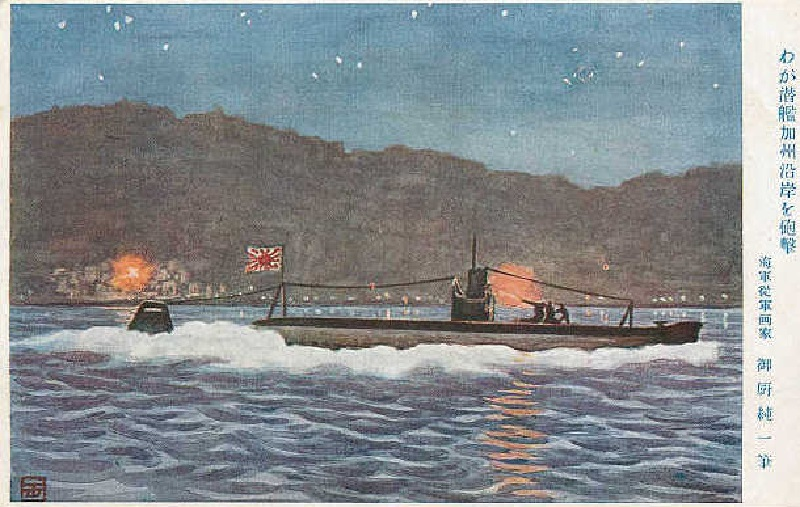
Japanese submarine attacks coast of California

The United States confronted espionage activities with the Federal Bureau of Investigation uncloaking the Duquesne Spy Ring in 1941 and Operation Pastorius in 1942. The Imperial Japanese Navy conducted attacks on the West Coast of the United States. The air attack on Pearl Harbor in Oahu, Hawaii killed 2,403 people and almost wrecked the United States Pacific Fleet. Three months later on March 4, 1942, two Japanese reconnaissance aircraft undertook a limited operation to disrupt repairs of the U.S. Pacific Fleet at Oahu, dropping a couple of bombs on the slopes of Tantalus Peak and near the Roosevelt High School.

Throughout the rest of the war, it was the continental Pacific coastline that encountered the Imperial Japanese forces with the battle of Los Angeles, the bombardment of Ellwood, the Aleutian Islands campaign, the bombardment of Fort Stevens, and Lookout Air Raids.

The Empire of Japan discovered a gas balloon could travel thousands of miles if navigated by the Earth's air current or jet stream. In 1933, Imperial Japanese Military commenced the design and development of the Fu-Go balloon bomb launching 9,000 hydrogen balloons from 1944 to 1945 to firebombing the Western United States.

== See also ==
- Aerial bombing of cities
- Internment of German Americans
- American Theater (World War II)
- Internment of Italian Americans
- Asiatic-Pacific Theater
- Internment of Japanese Americans
- California during World War II
- Strategic bombing during World War II
- Executive Order 9066
- United States home front during World War II

== Books ==
- Mikesh, Robert C. (1973). Japan's World War II Balloon Bomb Attacks on North America. Washington, D.C.: Smithsonian Institution Press. ISBN 978-0874749113. OCLC 416876.
- Coen, Ross A. (2014). Fu-go: The Curious History of Japan's Balloon Bomb Attack on America. Lincoln, Nebraska: University of Nebraska Press. ISBN 978-0803249660. OCLC 877370381.
- Young, Elizabeth L. (2016). Fugo: Terror from the Sky. North Salem, New Hampshire: Divertir Publishing. ISBN 978-1938888151. OCLC 979733955.

== Historical video archives ==
- "Air Raid Warning!". Internet Archive. Periscope Film. 1942.
- "Civilian Fire Fighters". Internet Archive. Periscope Film. 1942.
- "Japanese Paper Balloon". Internet Archive. U.S. National Archives and Records Administration. 1942.
- Japanese Balloon Bombs - The Strange Truth on YouTube
- "The Civilian Serves". Periscope Film. Castle Films. 1942.
- "WWII Weekly Digest ~ Japanese Fire Balloons ~ Helicopters in China ~ Atomic Bomb 43694a". Periscope Film. Army Air Forces Combat Film Service. 1945.
