= Joseph C. Baldwin =

American politician (1897–1957)

Joseph Clark Baldwin
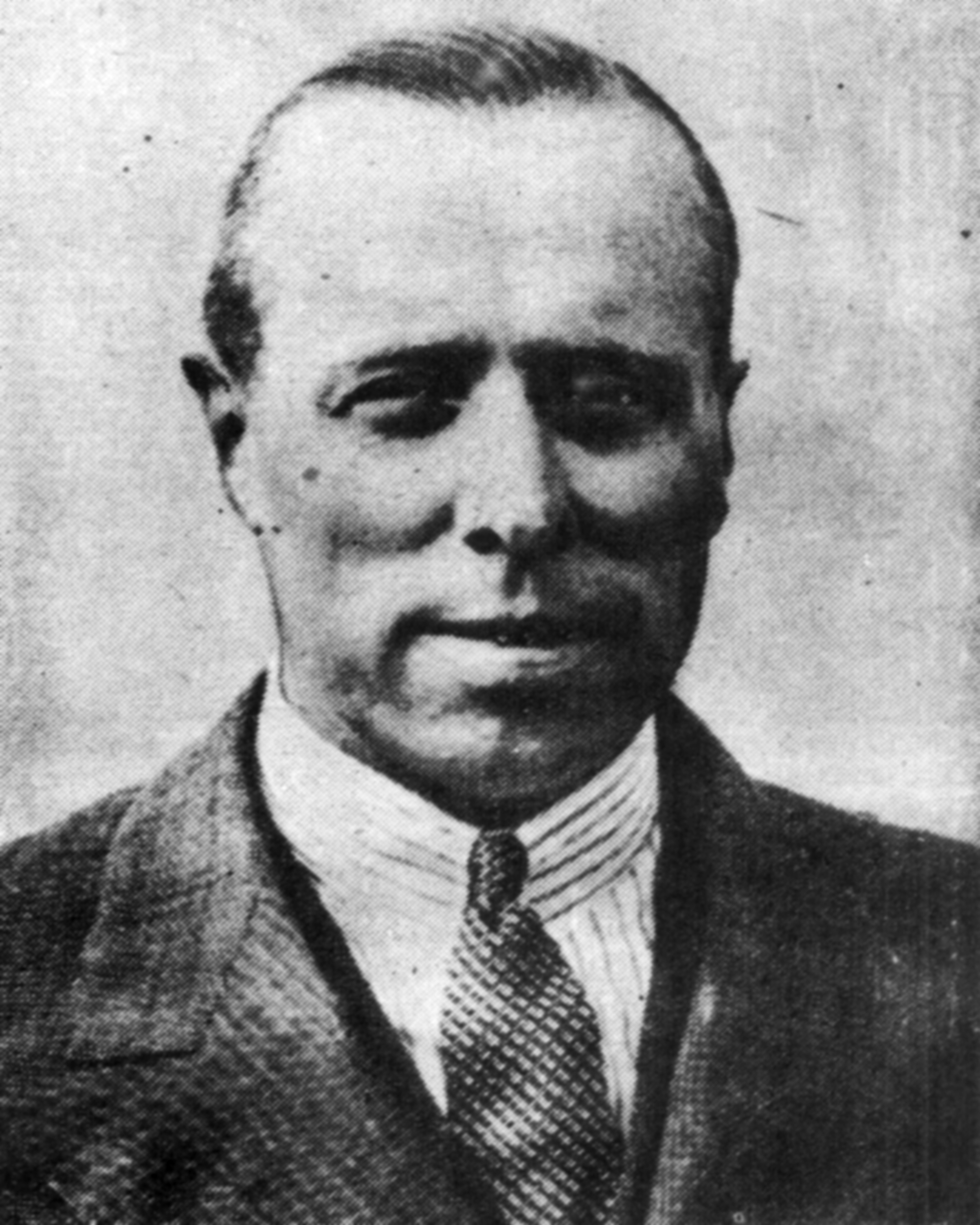
- Baldwin c. 1933

Member of the U.S. House of Representatives from New York's 17th district
- In office March 11, 1941 – January 3, 1947
- Preceded by: Kenneth F. Simpson
- Succeeded by: Frederic Coudert Jr.

Member of the New York City Council from Manhattan At-Large
- In office January 1, 1938 – March 11, 1941
- Preceded by: Multi-member district
- Succeeded by: Multi-member district

Member of the New York State Senate from the 17th district
- In office January 1, 1935 – December 31, 1936
- Preceded by: Albert Wald
- Succeeded by: Leon A. Fischel

Member of the New York City Board of Aldermen
- In office 1929–1934

Personal details
- Born: January 11, 1897 New York City, US
- Died: October 27, 1957 (aged 60) New York City, US
- Party: Republican
- Other political affiliations: American Labor (1946)
- Spouse: Marthe Guillon-Verne Baldwin
- Education: Harvard University
- Profession: newspaper reporter politician

Military service
- Allegiance: United States
- Branch/service: United States Navy; United States Army
- Rank: Seaman; Private; Captain
- Unit: Machine Gun Company of the Three Hundred and Fifth Infantry
- Commands: First Platoon, Machine Gun Company, Thirty-ninth Infantry
- Battles/wars: World War I
- Awards: French Legion of Honor

Joseph Clark Baldwin (January 11, 1897 – October 27, 1957) was an American politician, United States Army officer, and a Republican member of the United States House of Representatives from New York.

== Biography ==
Born Joseph Clark Baldwin III in New York City, New York, son of Joseph Clark Baldwin Jr. and Fanny Taylor Baldwin, he dropped the III upon his father's death in 1937. He attended private schools, and was graduated from St. Paul's School, Concord, New Hampshire, in 1916. He married Marthe Guillon-Verne on December 5, 1923, and they had two sons and two daughters.

As told by his friend and employee Henry Munson: "Joe and his wife would have "At Homes" every other Thursday evening. Much of NY Society turned out as well as visiting celebrities. One time Walker Buckner said "Someone told me that Winston Churchill was in NY but I knew he couldn't be or he would have been at Joe's "At Home" last Thursday. Churchill called Joe "Horatio" at the Bridge because of his lonely but successful fight to clean up NYC." Henry also mentions Joe's sense of humor and told this story from Bobby Straus 'He told about a meeting when a Lower East Side politician introduced him as Alderman Joseph Clark Baldwin the "Toid." Joe couldn't resist saying that since his father had died, he had dropped the 'Toid.'"

== Career ==
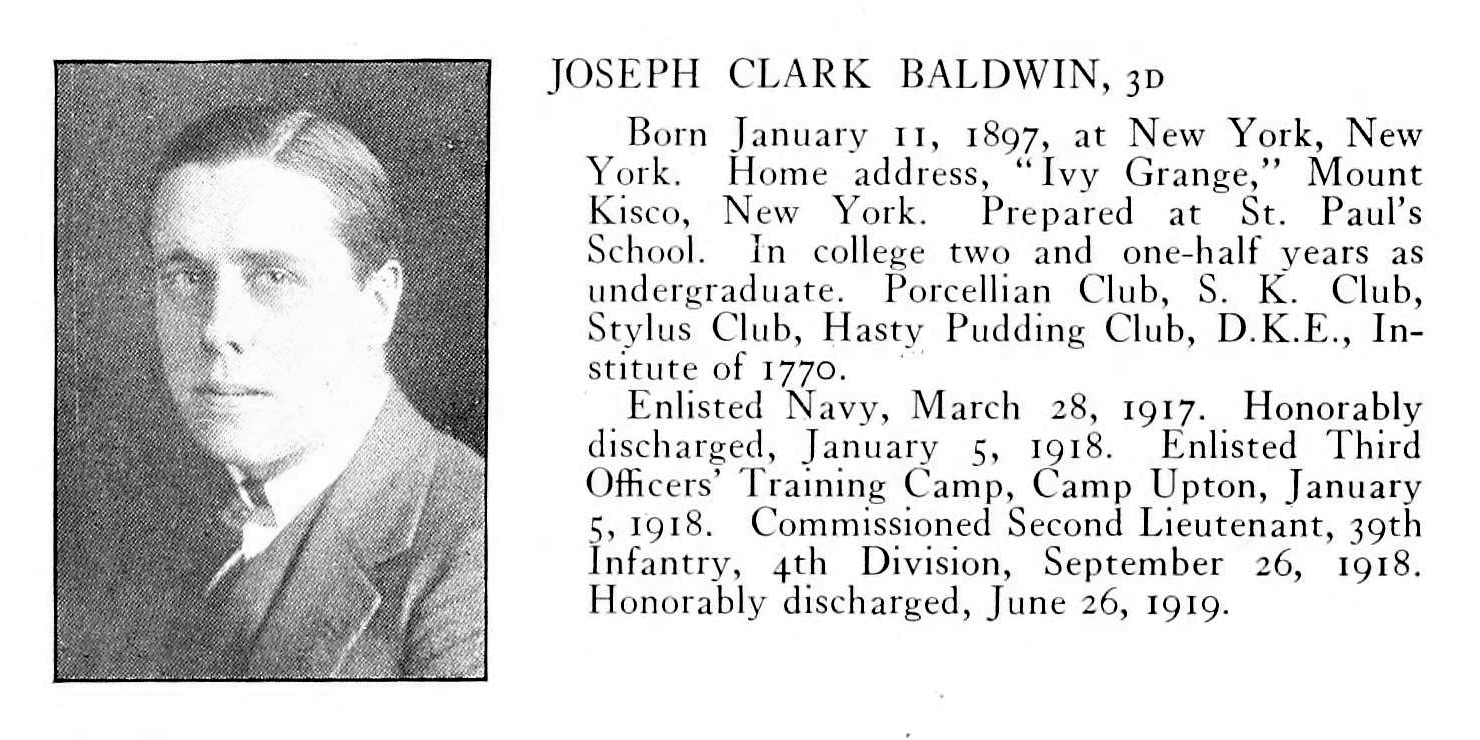
Baldwin in the Harvard University yearbook, 1920

During World War I, Baldwin enlisted in the United States Navy in 1917; but after 6 months of seasickness he was transferred to the United States Army in 1918. He first served overseas as a private in the Machine Gun Company of the Three Hundred and Fifth Infantry. He then received a commission and, as captain, commanded the First Platoon, Machine Gun Company, Thirty-ninth Infantry. In honor of his service in France he was made an officer of the French Legion of Honor.

Graduated from Harvard University in 1920 where he was a member of the Hasty Pudding Club, Baldwin was a political reporter for the New York Tribune, and became Associate Editor for the "North Westchester Times" from 1922 to 1930. In 1930 he established a public relations firm.

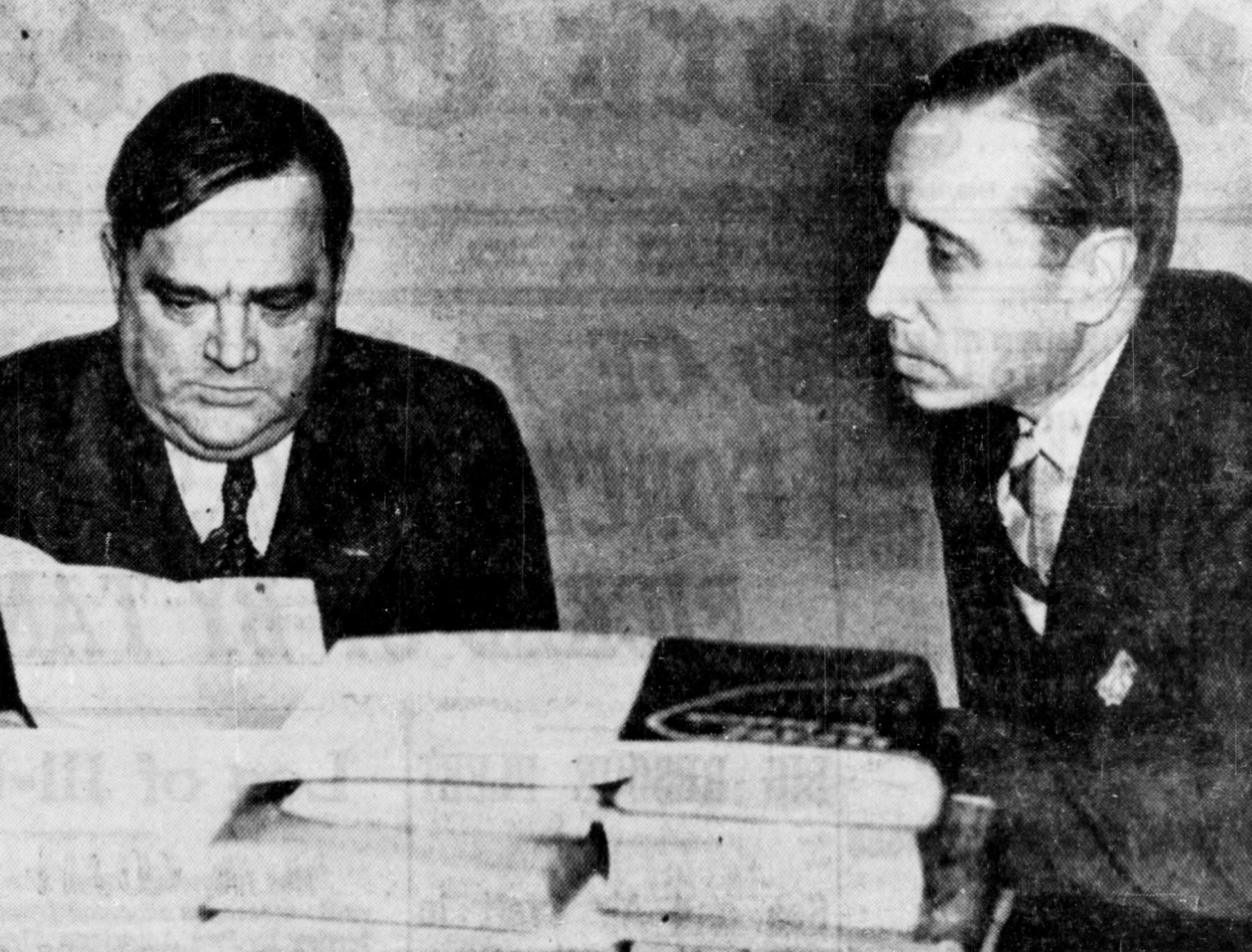
Baldwin speaks with mayor La Guardia, January 1939

From 1929 to 1934, he served as a member of the board of aldermen of New York City. From the recollections of his employee Henry Munson "In NYC's old Board of Alderman, Joe was the only Republican member with 94 Tammany Democrats. They joked that he held his party caucuses in a phone booth. He led the fight to get NY State to investigate the very rotten administration of Mayor Jimmy Walker. The Seabury Investigation resulted and a Fusion Mayor, Fiorello La Guardia, was elected and a new NYC charter was approved;Joe was well publicized for his role."

He served as President of the New York Young Republican Club from 1930 to 1931.

He was a member of the New York State Senate (17th D.) in 1935 and 1936; and of the New York City Council from 1937 to 1941. He was a delegate to the New York State Constitutional Convention of 1938.

Baldwin was elected as a Republican to the 77th United States Congress to fill the vacancy caused by the death of Kenneth F. Simpson. He was re-elected to the 78th and 79th United States Congresses, holding office from March 11, 1941, to January 3, 1947. An unsuccessful candidate for renomination in 1946 to the Eightieth Congress, he became a representative for United Dye and Chemical Corporation, and William Recht Company, Incorporated.

== Death ==
Baldwin died, in the Veterans Administration Hospital, Manhattan, New York County, New York, on October 27, 1957 (age 60 years, 289 days). He is interred at Woodlawn Cemetery, Bronx, New York.

New York State Senate
Preceded by Albert Wald	New York State Senate; 17th District; 1935–1936	Succeeded by Leon A. Fischel
U.S. House of Representatives
Preceded by Kenneth F. Simpson	Member of the U.S. House of Representatives from New York's 17th congressional district 1941–1947	Succeeded by Frederic Coudert Jr.
