= John W. Murphy (Pennsylvania politician) =

American judge (1902–1962)

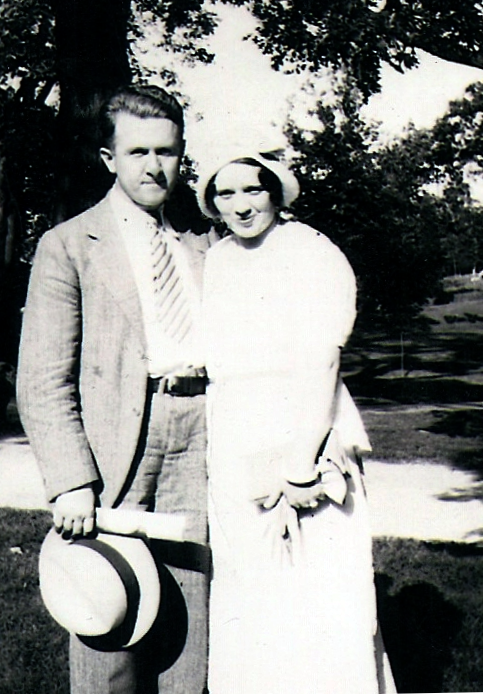
- Murphy with his wife Ella at their wedding

Chief Judge of the United States District Court for the Middle District of Pennsylvania
- In office 1955–1962
- Preceded by: Albert Leisenring Watson
- Succeeded by: Frederick Voris Follmer

Judge of the United States District Court for the Middle District of Pennsylvania
- In office May 27, 1946 – March 28, 1962
- Appointed by: Harry S. Truman
- Preceded by: Albert Williams Johnson
- Succeeded by: William Joseph Nealon Jr.

Member of the U.S. House of Representatives from Pennsylvania
- In office January 3, 1943 – July 17, 1946
- Preceded by: Veronica Grace Boland (11th); J. Roland Kinzer (10th)
- Succeeded by: Daniel J. Flood (11th); James P. Scoblick (10th)
- Constituency: 11th district (1943-45); 10th district (1945-46)

Personal details
- Born: John William Murphy; April 26, 1902 Avoca, Pennsylvania, U.S.
- Died: March 28, 1962 (aged 59) Scranton, Pennsylvania, U.S.
- Resting place: St. Catherine's Cemetery; Moscow, Pennsylvania
- Party: Democratic
- Education: University of Pennsylvania (B.S.); University of Pennsylvania Law School (LL.B.)

John William Murphy (April 26, 1902 – March 28, 1962) was a United States representative from Pennsylvania and a United States district judge of the United States District Court for the Middle District of Pennsylvania.

== Education and career ==
Murphy was born in Avoca, Luzerne County, Pennsylvania. His father, Edward T. Murphy, was a coal miner, and he worked as a mine slate picker after his father's death. Murphy attended the public schools, then received a Bachelor of Science degree from the Wharton School of the University of Pennsylvania in 1926. He received a Bachelor of Laws from University of Pennsylvania Law School in 1929. He was admitted to the bar in 1929 and commenced private practice of law in Scranton, Pennsylvania from 1929 to 1943. He was an assistant district attorney of Lackawanna County, Pennsylvania from 1934 to 1941. He was a United States representative from Pennsylvania from 1943 to 1946.

== Congressional service ==
Murphy was elected as a Democrat to the 78th and 79th United States Congresses and served from January 3, 1943, until his resignation on July 17, 1946. Murphy served on the Joint House-Senate Committee to investigate the attack on Pearl Harbor in 1945. That led to a close friendship with Vice President Alben W. Barkley, who headed the Senate side of the investigation.

== Federal judicial service ==
Murphy was nominated by President Harry S. Truman on May 7, 1946, to a seat on the United States District Court for the Middle District of Pennsylvania vacated by Judge Albert Williams Johnson. He was confirmed by the United States Senate on May 21, 1946, and received his commission on May 27, 1946. He served as Chief Judge from 1955 to 1962. He served on the Committee of Operation of the Jury System in the United States Courts of the Judicial Conference of the United States. His service was terminated on March 28, 1962, due to his death in Scranton.

== Other service ==
Murphy was a member of the Board of Managers of the University of Pennsylvania Law School and Chairman of the Board of Advisors of Marywood College.

== Interment ==
Murphy is interred in St. Catherine's Cemetery in Moscow, Pennsylvania.

== Honor ==
Murphy was made a Knight of the Cross of the Equestrian Order of the Holy Sepulcher in an investiture ceremony at St. Patrick's Cathedral on September 10, 1960.

== Family ==
Murphy married Ella Heffron and had four children.

== Sources ==
- United States Congress. "John W. Murphy (id: M001099)". Biographical Directory of the United States Congress.
- The Political Graveyard

U.S. House of Representatives
Preceded by Veronica Grace Boland	Member of the U.S. House of Representatives from Pennsylvania's 11th congressional district 1943–1945	Succeeded by Daniel J. Flood
Preceded by J. Roland Kinzer	Member of the U.S. House of Representatives from Pennsylvania's 10th congressional district 1945–1946	Succeeded by James P. Scoblick
Legal offices
Preceded by Albert Williams Johnson	Judge of the United States District Court for the Middle District of Pennsylvania; 1946–1962	Succeeded by William Joseph Nealon Jr.
Preceded by Albert Leisenring Watson	Chief Judge of the United States District Court for the Middle District of Pennsylvania; 1955–1962	Succeeded by Frederick Voris Follmer
