= James P. Scoblick =

American politician (1909–1981)

James Paul Scoblick (May 10, 1909 – December 4, 1981) was a Republican member of the U.S. House of Representatives from Pennsylvania.

James P. Scoblick was born in Archbald, Pennsylvania; both of his parents were Italian immigrants. He graduated from Fordham University in New York City in 1930 and took postgraduate work at Columbia University in New York City. He served as a member of the Department of Public Assistance Board of Lackawanna County, Pennsylvania.

Scoblick was elected as a Republican to the 79th United States Congress to fill the vacancy caused by the appointment of incumbent Democrat John W. Murphy as a federal judge and at the same time was elected to the 80th United States Congress. The 79th Congress having adjourned, Scoblick was not sworn in until the 80th. Scoblick won a narrow victory in 1946 and, although an unchallenged nominee of the party organization that year, was denied designation for renomination in 1948. His vote in favor of the Taft-Hartley Act may have weighed against him in a coal-mining district, but he was also fighting a number of financial suits involving his fruit business. He campaigned anyway and took 24% in the primary. In 1952 he sought the Republican nomination for the U.S. Senate and came in third.

He resumed former business pursuits and engaged as consultant to food industry. In January 1953, Scoblick and two of his brothers were indicted in a check kiting scheme involving their fruit-processing business, Scoblick Bros. Inc. With the testimony of a bank cashier who turned state's evidence, all three were convicted on December 3, 1954, and Judge Albert L. Watson sentenced James Scoblick to five years in prison.

Scoblick was a resident of Archbald, until his death there on December 4, 1981, and was interred in Mother of Sorrows Cemetery in Finch Hill, Pennsylvania.

== Sources ==
- United States Congress. "James P. Scoblick (id: S000163)". Biographical Directory of the United States Congress.

U.S. House of Representatives
Preceded by John W. Murphy	Member of the U.S. House of Representatives from Pennsylvania's 10th congressional district 1946–1949	Succeeded by Harry P. O'Neill
