= William Kelly Simpson =

American Egyptologist (1928–2017)

William Simpson
- Born: January 3, 1928; New York City, New York, United States
- Died: March 24, 2017 (aged 89)
- Spouse: Marilyn Milton
- Children: Laura and Abigail
- Parent(s): Kenneth Simpson; Helen-Louise Porter

William Kelly Simpson (January 3, 1928 – March 24, 2017) was an American professor of Egyptology, Archaeology, Ancient Egyptian literature, and Afro-Asiatic languages at Yale University.

He was one of several co-directors of the University of Pennsylvania Museum Yale University Expedition to Abydos, Egypt, which conducts archaeological excavations of ancient sites. He was elected to the American Philosophical Society in 1983.

== Personal life ==
Simpson was born on January 3, 1928, in New York City, to Kenneth Simpson and Helen-Louise Knickerbacker Porter (1893-1981).

He married Marilyn Ellen Milton (1931-1980), a granddaughter of philanthropists John Rockefeller Jr. William and Marilyn have two children:

- Laura Knickerbacker Simpson (1954-2012)
- Abigail Rockefeller Simpson (born 1958): married Todd Mydland.

Simpson died on March 24, 2017, at the age of 89.

== Literature ==
- Peter Manuelian (editor): Studies in Honor of William Kelly Simpson, Museum of Fine Arts, Boston 1996 ISBN 0878463909
- W.K. Simpson, (editor): "The Literature of Ancient Egypt", (London/New Haven: Yale University, 2003)
- W.K. Simpson, (author): The Offering Chapel of Kayemnofret in the Museum of Fine Arts, Boston, Museum of Fine Arts, Boston, 1992. (OCoLC)28641867

== See also ==
- List of Egyptologists
