= J. Harold Flannery =

American politician

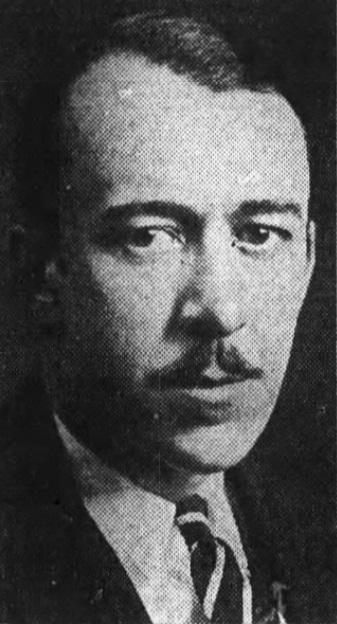
- Pittston Gazette (Pittston, PA), May 18, 1938

Member of the U.S. House of Representatives from Pennsylvania's 12th district
- In office January 3, 1937 – January 3, 1942
- Preceded by: Charles Murray Turpin
- Succeeded by: Thomas B. Miller

Personal details
- Born: James Harold Flannery; April 19, 1898 Pittston, Pennsylvania, U.S.
- Died: June 3, 1961 (aged 63) Bethesda, Maryland, U.S.
- Resting place: Mt. Olivet Catholic Cemetery in Pittston
- Party: Democratic
- Education: Wyoming Seminary; Dickinson Law School

Military service
- Branch/service: United States Army
- Battles/wars: World War I

John Harold Flannery (April 19, 1898 – June 3, 1961) was an American attorney and politician who served as a member of the U.S. House of Representatives for Pennsylvania's 12th congressional district from 1937 to 1942.

== Early life and education ==
Flannery was born in Pittston, Pennsylvania. He graduated from the Wyoming Seminary in Kingston, Pennsylvania, in 1917 and from the Penn State Dickinson Law in Carlisle, Pennsylvania, in 1920.

== World War I ==
During World War I, Flannery served as a private in the United States Army and was honorably discharged in 1918.

== Career ==
He was the solicitor for Pittston City from 1926 to 1930, and served as assistant district attorney of Luzerne County, Pennsylvania, from 1932 to 1936.

=== Congress ===
Flannery was elected as a Democrat to the Seventy-fifth, Seventy-sixth, and Seventy-seventh Congresses. He served from January 3, 1937, until his resignation on January 3, 1942.

=== Judge ===
He became judge of the common pleas court of Luzerne County. He was reelected in 1951 for a ten-year term and served until his death in Bethesda, Maryland.

=== Delegate ===
He was a delegate to the Democratic National Conventions in 1944 and in 1960.

== Death ==
He died in Bethesda on June 3, 1961 at the age of 63. He was interred at Mt. Olivet Catholic Cemetery in Pittston.

U.S. House of Representatives
Preceded by C. Murray Turpin	Member of the U.S. House of Representatives from Pennsylvania's 12th congressional district 1937–1942	Succeeded by Thomas B. Miller
