= Thomas B. Miller =

American politician

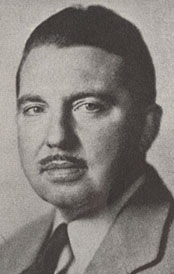
From the Biographical Directory of the United States Congress

Thomas Byron Miller (August 11, 1896 – March 20, 1976) was a Republican member of the U.S. House of Representatives from Pennsylvania.

== Biography ==
Thomas B. Miller was born in Plymouth, Pennsylvania. He attended the law school of Dickinson College in Carlisle, Pennsylvania. He was a member of the Sigma Alpha Epsilon fraternity. During the First World War, Miller served as a second lieutenant in the Sixteenth Field Artillery from February 25, 1918, until his discharge as a first lieutenant on September 23, 1919.

On January 23, 1942, Miller was chosen by the Luzerne County Republican Committee as their nominee to fill the vacancy in the Seventy-seventh Congress caused by the resignation of United States Representative J. Harold Flannery. Miller's Democratic opponent was Daniel J. Flood, and in the May 1942 special election, Miller prevailed, serving in the remainder of Flannery's term. Miller was reelected to the Seventy-eighth Congress, but was an unsuccessful candidate for reelection in 1944.

After leaving Congress, Miller resumed the practice of law in Pennsylvania and in Washington, D.C., in addition to becoming active in banking. He died in died on March 20, 1976, in Wilkes-Barre on March 20, 1976. Miller was cremated and his ashes were scattered at his summer home in Orangeville.

U.S. House of Representatives
Preceded by J. Harold Flannery	Member of the U.S. House of Representatives from Pennsylvania's 12th congressional district 1942–1945	Succeeded by Ivor D. Fenton
