= Harry P. O'Neill =

American politician

Harry P. O’Neill
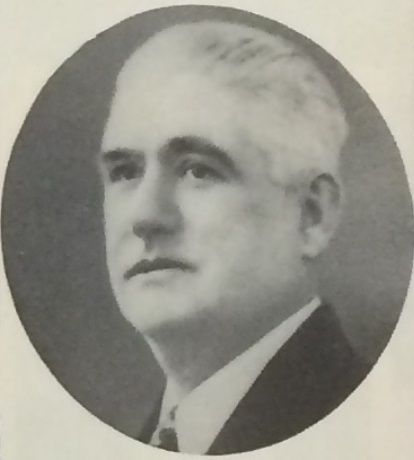
- Preceded by: James P. Scoblick
- Succeeded by: Joseph L. Carrigg

Member of the U.S. House of Representatives from Pennsylvania's 10th district
- In office January 3, 1949 – January 3, 1953

Member of the Pennsylvania House of Representatives
- In office 1929–1948

Personal details
- Born: Harry Patrick O’Neill; February 10, 1889 Dunmore, Pennsylvania, U.S.
- Died: June 24, 1953 (aged 64) Scranton, Pennsylvania, U.S.
- Resting place: Cathedral Cemetery
- Party: Democratic

Harry Patrick O'Neill (February 10, 1889 – June 24, 1953) was an American politician who served two terms as a Democratic United States representative from Pennsylvania from 1949 to 1953.

== Biography ==
Harry P. O'Neill was born in Dunmore, Pennsylvania to Irish immigrants.

=== Early career ===
He left school at the age of ten and went to work as a slate picker in the O.S. Johnson Colliery in Dunmore. He worked evenings as an apprentice barber until the age of sixteen and at the age of eighteen purchased his employer's business. He was also engaged as an insurance broker. He served in the Pennsylvania State House of Representatives from 1929 to 1948.

=== Congress ===
O'Neill was elected as a Democrat to the Eighty-first and Eighty-second Congresses, but he was an unsuccessful candidate for reelection in 1952, when redistricting forced him into an election with fellow incumbent Congressman Joseph L. Carrigg.

== Death and burial ==
Had he been reelected, he may not have survived to fulfill his term. He died in Scranton, Pennsylvania on June 24, 1953. His body is interred in Cathedral Cemetery.

U.S. House of Representatives
Preceded by James P. Scoblick	Member of the U.S. House of Representatives from Pennsylvania's 10th congressional district 1949–1953	Succeeded by Joseph L. Carrigg
