= Patrick J. Boland =

American politician (1880–1942)

Patrick Joseph Boland
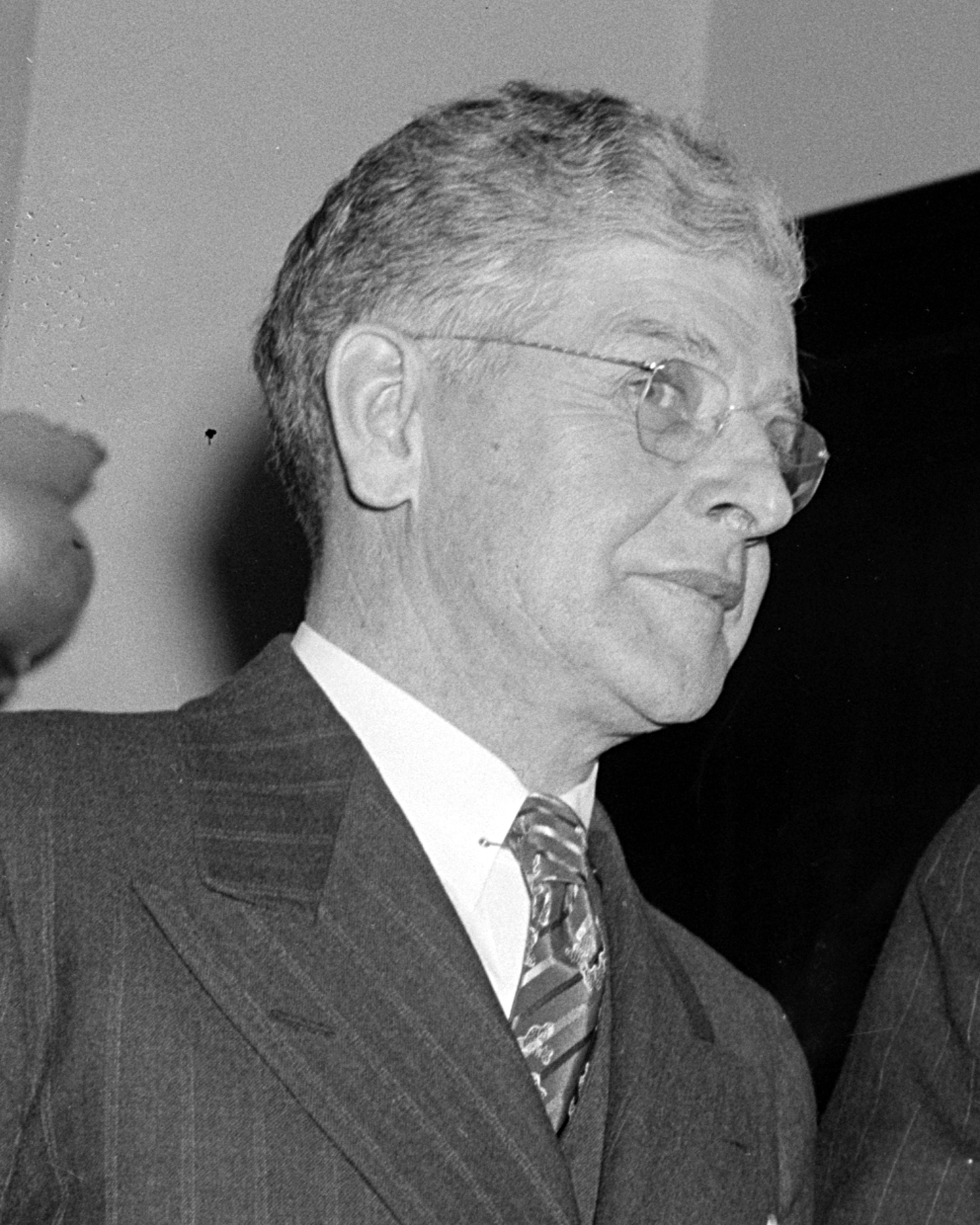

House Majority Whip
- In office January 3, 1935 – May 18, 1942
- Preceded by: Arthur H. Greenwood
- Succeeded by: Robert Ramspeck

Member of the U.S. House of Representatives from Pennsylvania's 11th district
- In office March 4, 1931 – May 18, 1942
- Preceded by: Laurence Hawley Watres
- Succeeded by: Veronica Grace Boland

Personal details
- Born: January 6, 1880 Scranton, Pennsylvania, U.S.
- Died: May 18, 1942 (aged 62) Scranton, Pennsylvania, U.S.
- Resting place: Cathedral Cemetery in Scranton
- Party: Democratic

Patrick Joseph Boland (January 6, 1880 – May 18, 1942) was an American tradesman and politician who served six terms as a United States representative for Pennsylvania 11th district.

== Early life and education ==
Born in Scranton, Pennsylvania, to Irish immigrants, he attended St. Thomas College (now the University of Scranton).

== Career ==
He worked as a carpenter and general contractor. He was on the Scranton city council from 1905 to 1906, the Board of education from 1907 to 1909. He then served as county commissioner of Lackawanna County from 1915 to 1919.

=== Congress ===
A Democrat, he was elected to the House of Representatives in 1930, serving until his death in 1942. From 1935, he served as the Majority Whip.

== Death and burial ==
He died in Scranton on May 18, 1942. A Roman Catholic, he was interred in the Cathedral Cemetery in Scranton.

== Personal life ==
He was married twice, first to Sarah Jennings on November 24, 1908; after her death, he married Veronica Barrett on October 27, 1931. She would serve out the rest of his term after he died.

He was a member of the Benevolent and Protective Order of Elks and of the Knights of Columbus.

== See also ==
- List of members of the United States Congress who died in office (1900–1949)

U.S. House of Representatives
Preceded by Laurence Hawley Watres	Member of the U.S. House of Representatives from Pennsylvania's 11th congressional district 1931–1942	Succeeded by Veronica Grace Boland
Party political offices
Preceded by Arthur H. Greenwood (D-IN)	House Majority Whip; 1935–1942	Succeeded by Robert Ramspeck (D-GA)
