= Robert F. Jones =

American novelist (1934–2002)

Robert Francis Jones (May 26, 1934 – December 18, 2002) was a novelist and an outdoor writer for Sports Illustrated and Field & Stream. Many of his novels contain fantastic and/or surrealistic elements, causing some critics to label his work slipstream. Jones' archive resides at the Albert and Shirley Small Special Collections Library at the University of Virginia.

Born and raised in Milwaukee, Wisconsin, Jones graduated with honors from the University of Michigan in 1956 and then served in the United States Navy as an ensign, with sea duty in the western Pacific. After his military service, he was a reporter for the Milwaukee Sentinel newspaper in 1959 and then went to Time magazine in 1960. Jones transferred to its sister publication Sports Illustrated in 1968, where he covered the outdoors and a variety of sports, including motor sports and pro football. His contributions at Sports Illustrated included the story "Harvey On The Lam," for the August 23, 1971, issue, famously featuring Steve McQueen doing a wheelie on a motorcycle on the cover.

A Vermont resident in his later years, Jones died at age 68 of natural causes at Southwestern Vermont Medical Center in Bennington in late 2002, survived by his wife of 46 years and two adult children.

== Bibliography ==
=== Fiction ===
- Blood Sport (1974): Novel about a father and son fishing trip up the mythical Hassayampa river, which runs from upstate New York to China, and ancient times, and their encounter with legendary outlaw "Ratnose."
- The Diamond Bogo (1978): The story of an African hunting expedition for a large cape buffalo with a giant diamond embedded in its horns, and involving the discovery of a surviving lost race colony of homo erectus.
- Slade's Glacier (1981)
- Blood Tide (1990): A nautical adventure tale of a father and daughter setting out to wreak vengeance on two different men who had each betrayed them.
- The Man-Eaters of Zamani (1991): Short story on the hunting of a lion in Zamani region of Somalia (Petersen's Hunting 1991) .
- Tie My Bones To Her Back (AKA The Buffalo Runners) (1996): Western
- Deadville (1999): Western
- The Run to Gitche Gumee

=== Non-fiction ===
- Gone to the Dogs: Life With My Canine Companions
- Dancers in the Sunset Sky
- The Fishing Doctor: the Essential Tackle Box Companion
- The Hunter In My Heart: A Sportsman's Salmagundi
- African Twilight: The Story of a Hunter
- Upland Passage: A Field Dog's Education
- Jake: A Labrador Puppy at Work and Play
