= Whitford, Pennsylvania =

Unincorporated community in Pennsylvania, US

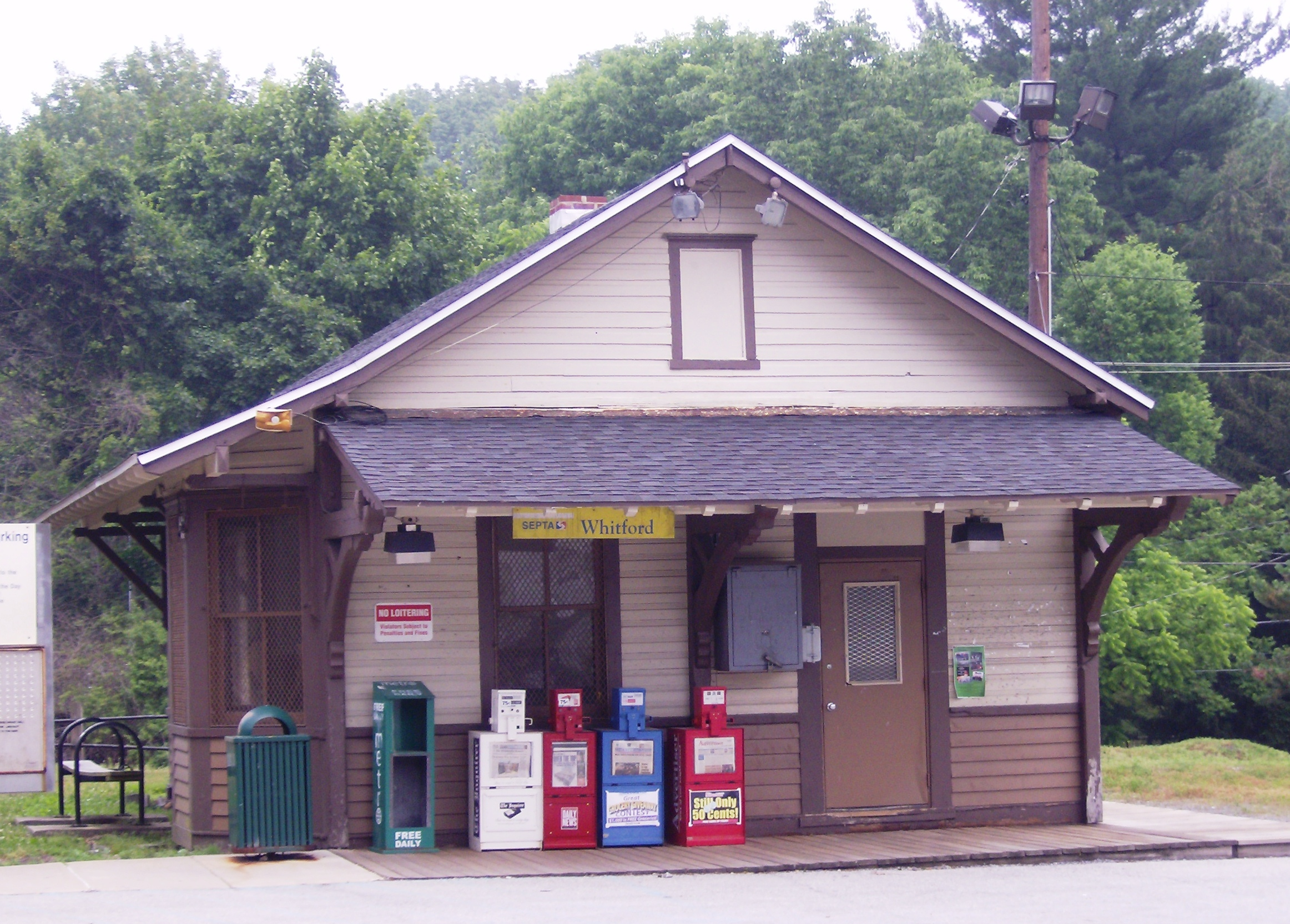
- Whitford SEPTA train station

- Location of Whitford in Pennsylvania Whitford (the United States)
- Coordinates: 40°0′52″N 75°38′16″W
- Country: United States
- State: Pennsylvania
- County: Chester
- Township: West Whiteland
- Elevation: 312 ft (95 m)
- Time zone: UTC-5 (EST)
  - Summer (DST): UTC-4 (EDT)
- ZIP Code: 19341
- Area code: 610

Whitford is a populated place located southwest of Exton in Chester County, Pennsylvania, United States. It is the location of the Whitford train station and the birthplace of Congressman Paul Dague. According to the previous source, the Whitford Lodge was once located just west of Pennsylvania Route 100 on U.S. Route 30 (now U.S. Route 30 Business), which is now at the edge of a shopping center.
