= Kenneth F. Simpson =

American politician (1895–1941)

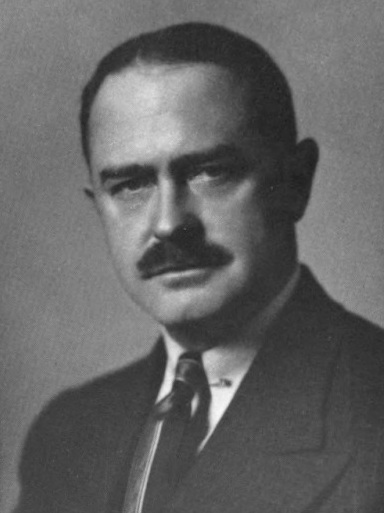

Member of the U.S. House of Representatives from New York's 17th district
- In office January 3, 1941 – January 25, 1941
- Preceded by: Bruce Barton
- Succeeded by: Joseph C. Baldwin

Personal details
- Born: May 4, 1895 New York City, New York
- Died: January 25, 1941 (aged 45) New York City, New York
- Spouse: Helen Louise Knickerbacker Porter (m. 1925)
- Children: 4, William Kelly Simpson
- Education: The Hill School
- Alma mater: Yale University

Kenneth Farrand Simpson (May 4, 1895 – January 25, 1941) was a Republican member of the United States House of Representatives from New York for the last 22 days of his life.

== Early life and education ==
Simpson was born in New York City on May 4, 1895, the son of William Kelly Simpson, an ear, nose and throat specialist and professor at Columbia University. He graduated from The Hill School, and his senior year was notable for his success at convincing Theodore Roosevelt to speak at the school. He graduated from Yale University in 1917, where he became a member of Phi Beta Kappa and was initiated into Skull and Bones, receiving the honor of "last man tapped".

== Military service ==
Simpson served in World War I as a member of the 302nd Field Artillery Regiment, a unit of the 76th Division, attaining the rank of captain. He later served as Commandant of the American School Detachment at the University of Aix-Marseilles.

== Law and art ==
Simpson graduated from Harvard Law School in 1922 and became an attorney. He was active in the art world of post-war France, and worked with the French government to recover works stolen by the Germans during the war. He also represented many artists and writers with whom he was friendly, including Pablo Picasso, Alexander Kerensky, Edmund Wilson, and Gertrude Stein. His congressional campaign materials depicted him in his living room, leaning near a statue of Stein and smoking a pipe under a painting by Jean Lurçat. He was an Assistant United States Attorney for the Southern District of New York from 1925 to 1927.

== Politics and death ==
Simpson chaired the New York County Republican Committee from 1935 to 1940. He was elected to represent New York on the Republican National Committee, and was a delegate to the 1936 and 1940 Republican National Conventions. He supported the Fusion Republicans who fought conservatives for control of the Republican Party in New York, and formed alliances with Fiorello H. La Guardia and other liberal Republicans. He was an internationalist, and an early critic of Adolf Hitler and the U.S. business interests that were seen as sympathetic to the Nazis in the 1930s.

Simpson was elected to Congress in November 1940, sworn in on January 3, 1941, and died of a heart attack in New York City on January 25, after under a month in office. His body is buried at Hudson City Cemetery in Hudson, New York.

== Family ==
In 1925, Simpson married Helen Louise Knickerbacker Porter of Montclair, New Jersey. They had four children: Egyptologist William Kelly Simpson, Helen-Louise Simpson Seggerman, Elizabeth Carroll Simpson Bennett and Sally Simpson French.

== See also ==
- List of members of the United States Congress who died in office (1900–1949)

U.S. House of Representatives
Preceded by Bruce Barton	Member of the U.S. House of Representatives from New York's 17th congressional district 1941	Succeeded by Joseph C. Baldwin
