= J. Roland Kinzer =

American politician (1874–1955)

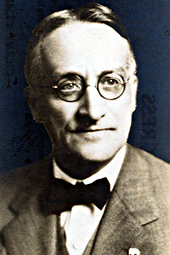

Member of the U.S. House of Representatives from Pennsylvania
- In office January 28, 1930 – January 3, 1947
- Preceded by: William W. Griest (10th); Charles L. Gerlach (9th)
- Succeeded by: John W. Murphy (10th); Paul B. Dague (9th)
- Constituency: 10th district (1930-45); 9th district (1945-47)

Personal details
- Born: March 28, 1874 Terre Hill, Pennsylvania, U.S.
- Died: July 25, 1955 (aged 81) Lancaster, Pennsylvania, U.S.
- Party: Republican
- Education: Franklin & Marshall College

John Roland Kinzer (March 28, 1874 – July 25, 1955) was a Republican member of the U.S. House of Representatives from Pennsylvania.

== Biography ==
J. Roland Kinzer was born on a farm near Terre Hill, Pennsylvania in East Earl Township, Lancaster County, Pennsylvania He graduated from Franklin & Marshall College in Lancaster, Pennsylvania, in 1896. He served as county solicitor of Lancaster County from 1912 to 1923, and as a delegate to the 1928 Republican National Convention. He was elected as a Republican to the seventy-first Congress to fill the vacancy caused by the death of William W. Griest. He was reelected to the seventy-second Congress and to the seven succeeding Congresses. He was not a candidate for renomination in 1946.

== Sources ==
- United States Congress. "J. Roland Kinzer (id: K000231)". Biographical Directory of the United States Congress.

U.S. House of Representatives
Preceded by William W. Griest	Member of the U.S. House of Representatives from Pennsylvania's 10th congressional district 1930–1945	Succeeded by John W. Murphy
Preceded by Charles L. Gerlach	Member of the U.S. House of Representatives from Pennsylvania's 9th congressional district 1945–1947	Succeeded by Paul B. Dague
