= Harry E. Narey =

American politician

Harry Elsworth Narey

Member of the U.S. House of Representatives from Iowa's 9th district
- In office November 16, 1942 – January 1, 1943
- Preceded by: Vincent F. Harrington
- Succeeded by: District eliminated

Personal details
- Born: May 15, 1885 Spirit Lake, Iowa, U.S.
- Died: August 18, 1962 (aged 77) Spirit Lake, Iowa, U.S.
- Party: Republican
- Education: Grinnell College; University of Iowa College of Law

Military service
- Allegiance: United States of America
- Branch/service: United States Army Air Forces

Harry Elsworth Narey (May 15, 1885 – August 18, 1962) was a Republican U.S. Representative from Iowa for several weeks between the 1942 general election and the commencement of the 1943-44 (78th) Congress. He was the last Congressman to serve in Iowa's 9th congressional district. He completed his career as a state trial court judge.

Born in Spirit Lake, Iowa, Narey attended the public schools and Grinnell College in Grinnell, Iowa. He graduated from the University of Iowa College of Law at Iowa City, Iowa in 1907. He was admitted to the bar the same year and commenced practice in Spirit Lake. He served as County Attorney of Dickinson County, Iowa from 1914 to 1920, and as City Attorney of Spirit Lake from 1918 to 1943. He served as delegate to the Republican State conventions from 1916 to 1960, and as chairman of the Dickson County Republican Central Committee from 1918 to 1943.

In 1942, Iowa Congressman Vincent F. Harrington enlisted in the United States Army Air Forces, and initially took a leave of absence from his seat in Congress. However, President Roosevelt ordered all military officers holding dual positions in Congress to resign from one position or the other, which prompted Harrington to remain in the Air Forces and therefore resign from Congress, in September 1942. His resignation prompted Governor George A. Wilson to add a ballot item to the November 1942 to elect a successor to fill Harrington's seat from the last few months of the Seventy-seventh Congress. Narey won that position, defeating Democratic candidate Otto J. Reimers.

He was sworn in on November 16, 1942, and served to January 3, 1943. The district in which he had been elected had already been eliminated due to reapportionment, effective January 1, 1943, and he did not run for any other seat in any other election.

Returning from Washington, he again practiced law and served as Dickinson County Attorney. He was appointed judge of the fourteenth judicial district of Iowa in 1944 and served on the bench until his resignation in 1959. He lived in Spirit Lake, until his death on August 18, 1962. He was interred in Lakeview Cemetery.

U.S. House of Representatives
| Preceded by Vincent F. Harrington | Member of the U.S. House of Representatives from Iowa's 9th congressional district 1942–1943 | Succeeded by District eliminated |
