= 1881 Iowa gubernatorial election =

- October 11, 1881
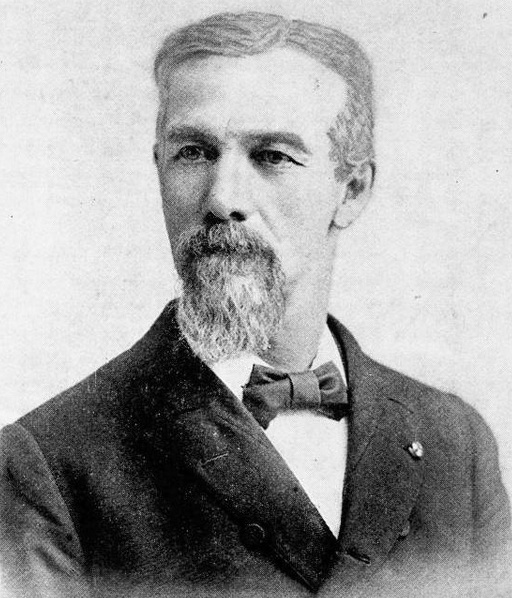

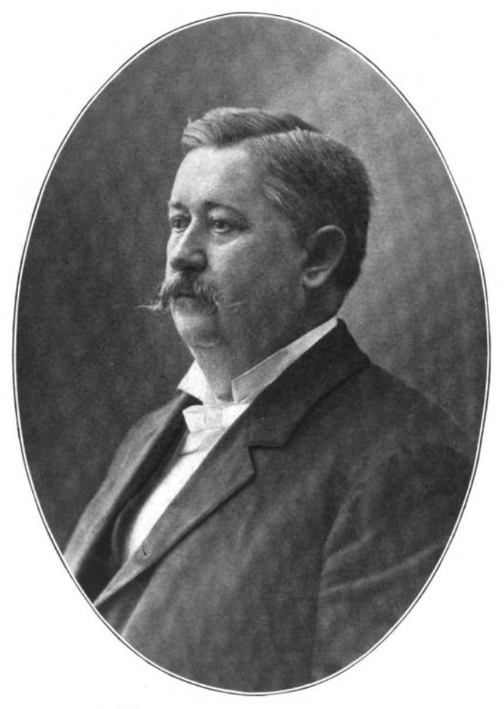

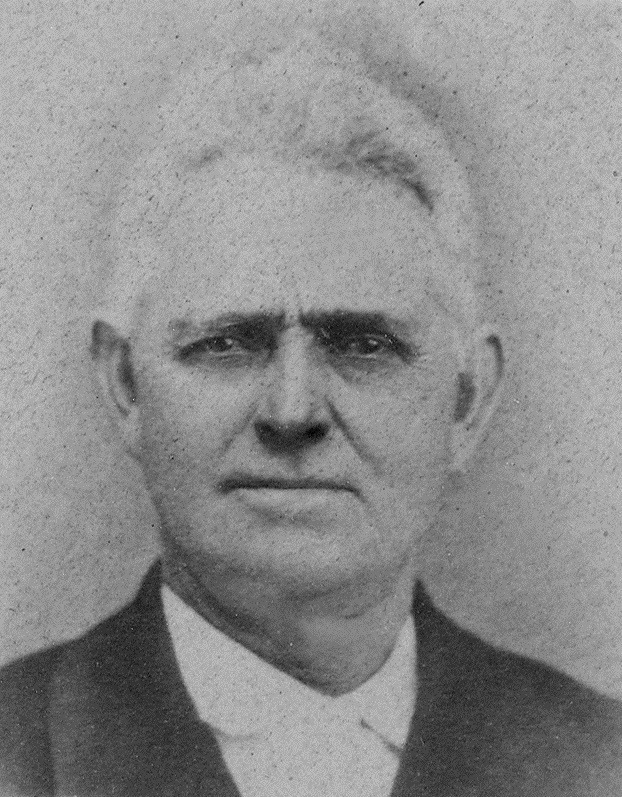
Nominee	Buren R. Sherman	La Vega G. Kinne	David M. Clark
Party	Republican	Democratic	Greenback
Popular vote	133,328	73,344	28,112
Percentage	56.72%	31.20%	11.96%
- County results Sherman: 40–50% 50–60% 60–70% 70–80% 80–90% 90–100% Kinne: 40–50% 50–60% Clark: 30–40%
Governor before election
John H. Gear
Republican
Elected Governor
Buren R. Sherman
Republican

The 1881 Iowa gubernatorial election was held on October 11, 1881. Republican nominee Buren R. Sherman defeated Democratic nominee La Vega G. Kinne with 56.72% of the vote.

== General election ==
=== Candidates ===
Major party candidates

- Buren R. Sherman, Republican
- La Vega G. Kinne, Democratic

Other candidates

- David M. Clark, Greenback

=== Results ===
1881 Iowa gubernatorial election
Party	Candidate	Votes	%	±%
Republican	Buren R. Sherman	133,328	56.72%	
Democratic	La Vega G. Kinne	73,344	31.20%	
Greenback	David M. Clark	28,112	11.96%	
Majority		59,984		
Turnout				
Republican hold		Swing		
