= John P. Irish =

American political party leader

- Irish c. 1902

Member of the Iowa House of Representatives from the 33rd district
- In office January 13, 1868 – January 11, 1874
- Preceded by: G.E. DeForest
- Succeeded by: George Paul

Personal details
- Born: January 1, 1843 Iowa City, Iowa, U.S.
- Died: October 6, 1924 (aged 81) Oakland, California, U.S.
- Party: Democratic
- Occupation: Politician, Public speaker, Activist, Newspaper editor

John Powell Irish (January 1, 1843 – October 6, 1924) was an American newspaper editor, politician and activist in the states of Iowa and California. He served in the Iowa House of Representatives from 1868 to 1874 and was a landowner in the Sacramento-San Joaquin Delta region of California. He was regarded as a fiery and influential public speaker, opposing prejudice against Japanese Americans, the Chinese Exclusion Act of 1882, women's suffrage, labor unions, and prohibition.

Irish was known as a "leader among editorial writers" of his generation, and according to U.S. Interior Secretary Franklin K. Lane was a "fiery orator of the denunciatory type."

== Professional life ==
=== In Iowa ===
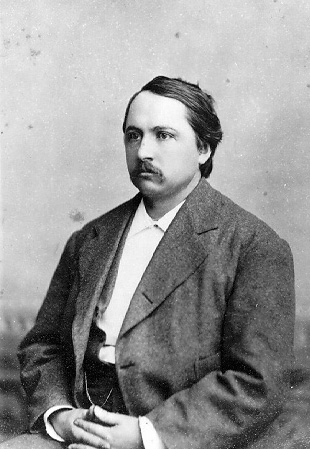
Irish earlier in life

At the age of seventeen, Irish began working as a teacher. At age twenty-one he became editor of the Iowa City Press, where he remained for twenty years. He "developed such ability both as a writer and public speaker that he was soon recognized as one of the leaders of the Democratic party of the state." He was elected three times to represent Johnson County, Iowa, in the state's General Assembly, from 1868 to 1874.

He had, as a teacher, seen the harm of electing members of school boards on a partisan ticket, and was the author of the law changing the time of electing school officers from the general to a special election, thus taking their election out of partisan politics.

He was an elected regent of the State University of Iowa, and in 1871 was instrumental in securing the return of the corpse of a woman whose body had been stolen from a town cemetery and which resulting "resurrection affair" had been trumpeted by newspapers that attacked the "medical hyenas attending the University." But before the affair died down, two medical students, a janitor and Irish himself were arrested. A grand jury "declined to find any of them at fault."

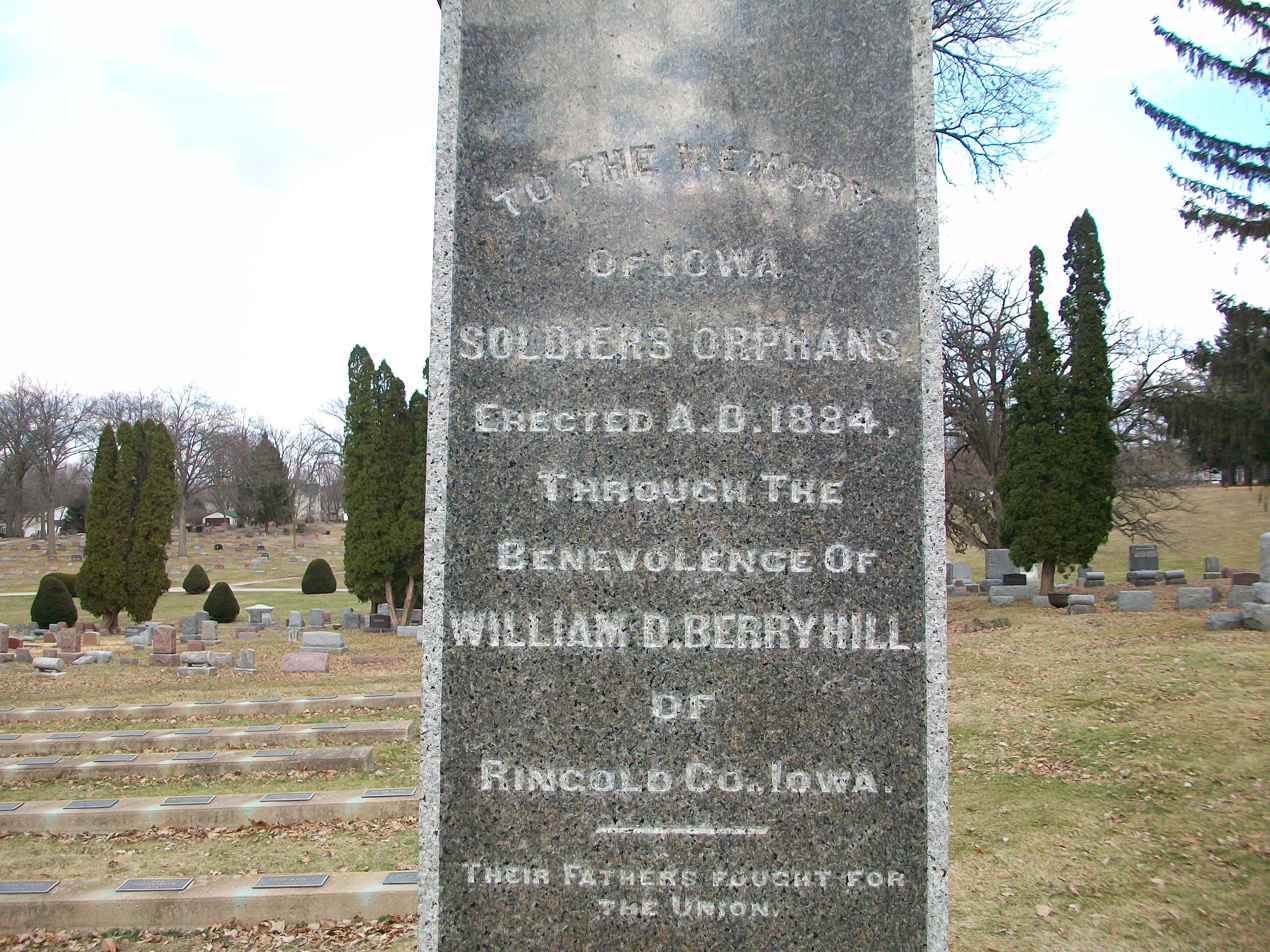
1884 monument at the Orphans' Home

In 1868, he was the unsuccessful Democratic candidate for Congress in the Fourth District. In 1877 he was the losing Democratic candidate for governor against Governor John H. Gear. He was also a trustee of the Iowa Soldiers' Orphans' Home.

About Irish's time in Iowa, ex-journalist H.C. Parkhurst, who had known Irish since boyhood, recalled in an essay titled "Western Newspaper Men," written for the Nebraska State Historical Society:

As a newspaper publisher, fine public speaker, politician and leading citizen of unblemished name, he won attention and respect. With high qualifications for a brilliant political career, he never seemed to "hit things right." There was always something the matter. For various reasons, he "pulled up" and went to California. There he . . . had everything he wanted but political success. That always evaded him.

=== In California ===
On moving to California in 1880, Irish immediately became editor of the Alta California newspaper and, after that paper's demise, became editor and "principal owner" of the Oakland Times.

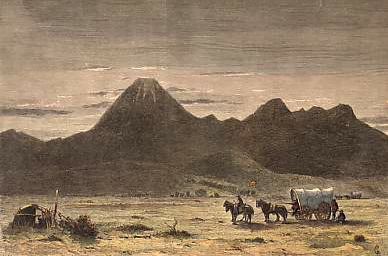
Lassen's Butte in the Sacramento Valley. Etching accompanied Irish's chapter in Picturesque California.

After 1888, Irish was a contributor to "the most comprehensive visual coverage of the Far West" then available—a printed work called Picturesque California and the Region West of the Rocky Mountains from Alaska to Mexico. In the chapter about the Sacramento Valley, for which he was responsible, "John P. Irish implicitly chides those who might denigrate the West by pointing out a wheat field in the irrigated Sacramento Valley nearly twice the size of Rhode Island and worth more than sixteen million dollars, the same amount the federal government paid Mexico in 1848 for California, Nevada, Utah, Arizona, and parts of Colorado and New Mexico."

"The Irish in English Chancery," a political cartoon by Charles W. Saalburg published in The Wasp depicting Irish in conflict with fellow Democrat William D. English, July 19, 1890

He was the Democratic candidate for Congress in the 3rd Congressional District in 1890, losing to Joseph McKenna.

In 1893 Irish was a featured speaker at a Los Angeles meeting of the influential National Irrigation Congress, where he warned the delegates that "we should not look to a paternal government to irrigate our lands for us, but should encourage individual effort."

Irish, in Omaha, Nebraska, to speak at a meeting of the Jackson Club in January 1894, told a reporter that he and the "California people" were opposed to annexing the Kingdom of Hawaii because "We know the revolution there was simply a job, largely by those who robbed themselves rich in this country [the United States], and are trying to do the same thing" in Hawaii.

Irish on the cover of The Wave, February 3, 1894

In 1894 he was appointed Naval Officer of Customs in San Francisco and was thereafter known as "Colonel." He was also on the board of the Yosemite Park commissioners, resigning in 1894.

Irish helped found the State Home for the Adult Blind, (Note: Or the California Blind Directory Home, as one source named it.) where he was president of the governing board and for twenty-five years was a director. In 1912 the institution was investigated upon a charge that Irish had used one of the residents as a "sort of servant at the Irish home," but the claimant apologized to investigators appointed by Governor Hiram Johnson and shook hands with Irish. "Mr. Irish said the home stood as a model for such institutions, not only in the United States, but in European countries" the Associated Press reported.

==== Gold standard ====
Irish c. 1901

Irish was one of the Democratic leaders who broke away from William Jennings Bryan over the latter's stand on a monetary system based on silver, and instead lobbied for a gold standard for U.S. currency. He was a member of the executive committee of the Monetary Congress organized in 1897 in Indianapolis, Indiana, to promote the gold standard. He opened a similar meeting in the same city in 1900.

In September and October 1895 Irish and Thomas V. Cator, who argued in favor of free silver, toured California with a series of debates on the question. The next year Irish attended the Democratic National Convention in Chicago but repudiated the national ticket headed by Bryan, whom he called a "raw man, who has achieved nothing in public or private life to fit him for the Presidency—a man who has won his reputation delivering orations at county fairs and Populist picnics." He called the Democratic platform "a league with larceny and a covenant with murder."

==== Opposed to unions ====
In October 1882, Irish, by then the "principal owner" of the Oakland Times, was attacked by a union printer who attempted to stab him while he was addressing a meeting. The man's anger was said to "have been caused by Mr. Irish employing in his newspaper office 'rats' and non-union printers."

In a 1906 address to the Starr King Fraternity of the First Unitarian Church of Oakland, Irish assailed "arrogant labor unions" for a rise in juvenile crime because they were "opposed to the apprenticeship of the American boy." "I now take the opportunity to say publicly that I never employ any one but a 'scab,'" he added, "and in that way enter my protest against a system that is driving our young men into lives of idleness."

In reacting to the 1910 bombing of the Los Angeles Times, which killed 21 Times employees and where union activists were suspected, Irish wrote to Times publisher Harrison Gray Otis:

Organized labor has come to be a synonym for organized crime. Its principles are at war with American institutions and its practices are at war with the rights of man. You have suffered, and your men have fallen, as much in the cause of liberty as if you had been leading them on the battlefield. All honor to your high courage and to their memory.

In 1913 Irish publicly protested a proposal to exempt unions from the Clayton Antitrust Act then being debated in the Senate.

==== Against votes for women ====
Irish gave many speeches in the early 'teens opposed to allowing women to vote. Typical was this 1911 speech reported in the San Francisco Chronicle:

The burden of the argument of Irish was that there could not be power without responsibility. Man was the voter because law primarily rested on the power to enforce the law. Woman could not serve on a posse comitatus or in the army. He did not think any one would want women to be locked up as jurors. There could not be power without responsibility. . . . Irish took the four suffrage states of Colorado, Wyoming, Utah and Idaho as horrible examples of what suffrage could bring about. Colorado had more juvenile delinquents in proportion to population than any other state because the women neglected their home duties to do politics, he said.

During the 1916 campaign for women's suffrage in Iowa, Irish came to Iowa from California to speak against a referendum that would adopt it, but suffragists uncovered favorable comments he had written about votes for women in his early years and circulated them widely. They also "reprinted his editorials written during the Civil War, in which his disloyalty to Lincoln and to the Union was shown. He was much disturbed by this publicity and soon left the State."

==== Favored Japanese and Chinese immigration ====
As an editor and agriculturalist, Irish became concerned with the treatment of people of Japanese descent living in the United States and he wrote, spoke and acted on the behalf of these people for many years. He founded and organized the American Committee on Justice to further this cause.

Irish had no regard for Congressman Thomas J. Geary of San Francisco, who wrote the Geary Act of 1892, which extended the Chinese Exclusion Act of 1882 and added onerous new requirements for Chinese residents in the United States. In December 1907, Irish opened a campaign for repeal of the Exclusion Act with a speech at a gathering of California fruit growers in Marysville. He attacked "San Francisco and unionism" for the "vast injury of fruit interests and other industries in the interior."

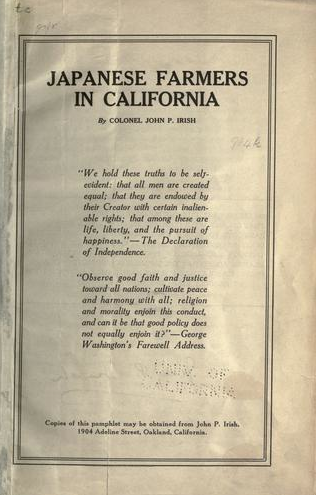
Front cover of Irish's 1919 pamphlet Japanese Farmers in California

In 1919 Irish published a pamphlet, Japanese Farmers in California, in which he repeated the remarks he had made to the 52nd convention of the California Fruit Growers and Farmers that year, saying that

When we treated our treaty with China as a scrap of paper and by the Geary Act excluded thirty thousand Chinese who were legally domiciled here, and by murdering and destroying the property of other Chinese, drove them out, there was created a shortage in farm labor, and this economic vacuum drew in the Japanese, who came protected by a solemn treaty between their government and ours. . . . Against this minute element many of our people are being lashed into a fury of apprehension, hatred and rage.

In 1920 he took on Senator James D. Phelan, who had been prominent in fostering anti-Japanese feeling in California. In a column in the Los Angeles Times, Irish wrote that

the present anti-Japanese agitation, like the anti-Chinese movement of years ago, has the same psychology as the Russian anti-Jewish pogrom, which always starts with the lie that Jews have murdered Christian children to use their blood in the rites of the synagogue. . . . Senator Phelan . . . has made no record of any benefit to the State in the Senate; so he must divert attention from his uselessness as a Senator by attacking the Japanese and trying to stampede the State by lying about them.

== Personal life ==
Irish was born to Frederick Macy Irish and Elizabeth Ann Robinson on January 1, 1843, in Iowa City, Iowa, where he received a "common school" education. He was married to Anna (McClellan) Fletcher in 1875, and in 1880 they moved to California. One headline writer noted in 1899 that Irish people at that time were "averse to wearing a necktie."

Irish was mentioned in three poems in Ambrose Bierce's book of poetry, Black Beetles in Amber (1892). In one poem, the narrator dies and goes to Hell, only to be surprised that the landscape is pleasant and attractive.

"Ah, no, this is not Hell," I cried;
"The preachers ne'er so greatly lied.
This is Earth's spirit glorified!

"Good souls do not in Hades dwell,
And, look, there's John P. Irish!" "Well,"
The Voice said, "that's what makes it Hell."

Irish was the maternal grandfather of Anne (Hus) Brower, wife of environmentalist David Brower.

== Death ==
Irish died at the age of eighty on October 6, 1923, from a fall while attempting to board a moving streetcar in Oakland, California. Irish's funeral was held at the Unitarian church in Oakland on October 9th. Honorary pallbearers for the funeral included former California governor George C. Pardee, George Shima, and Ng Poon Chew. The officiating minister was Reverend Clarence Reed, who was assisted by Charles William Wendte.

== See also ==
- Florin, California, for a statement by Irish about Japanese farmers

== Notes ==
Party political offices
Preceded by Shepherd Leffler	Democratic nominee for Governor of Iowa; 1877	Succeeded by Henry Hoffman Trimble
