= 1883 Iowa gubernatorial election =

- October 9, 1883
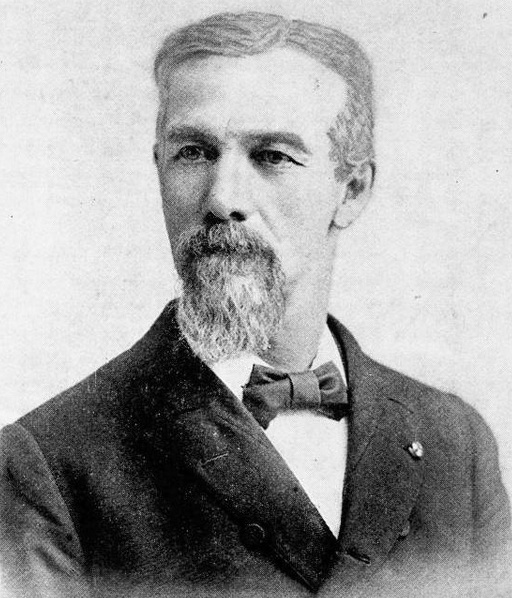

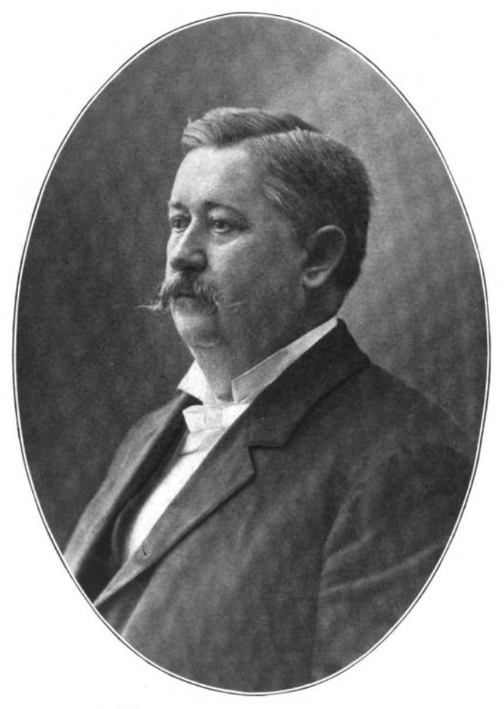

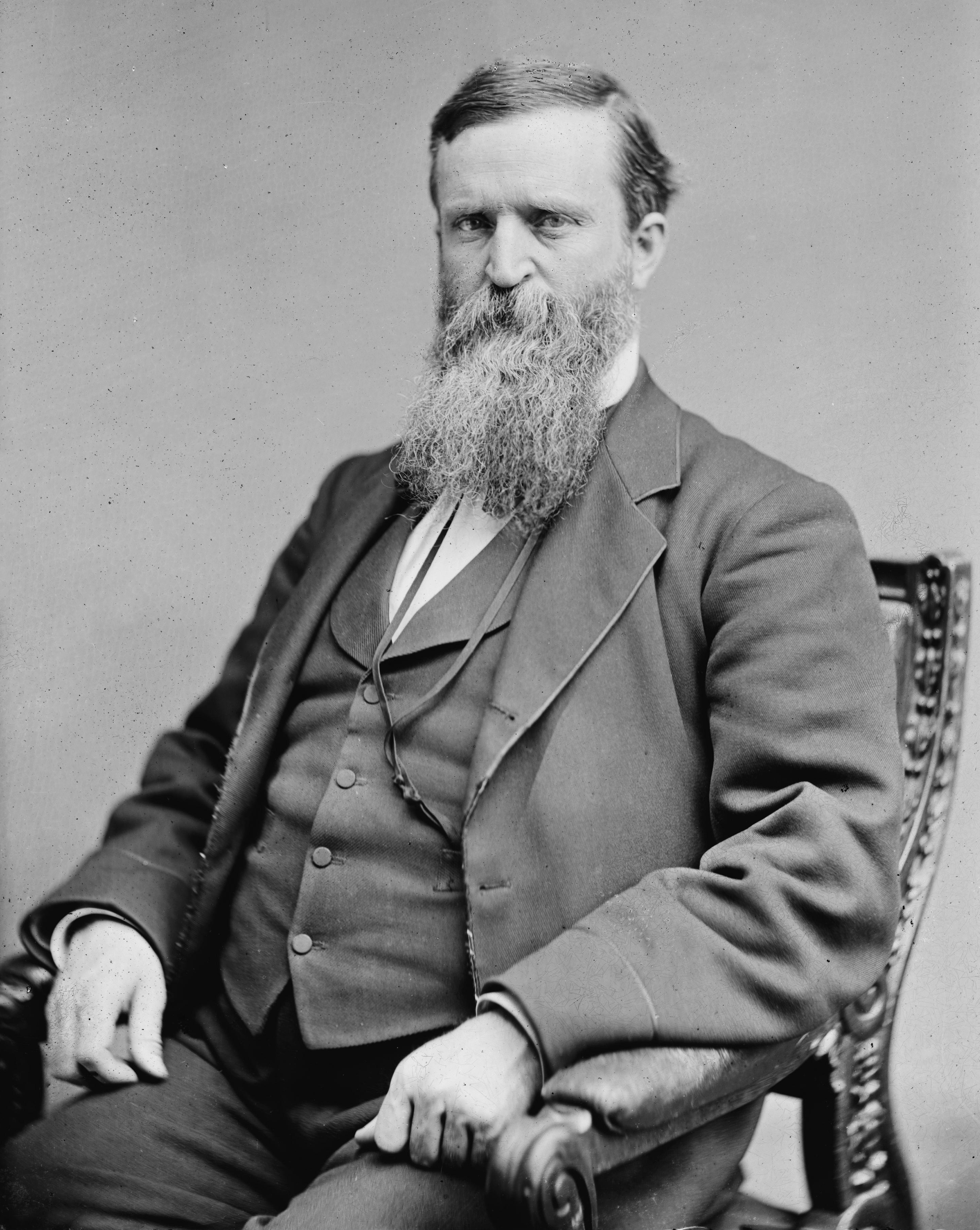
Nominee	Buren R. Sherman	L. G. Kinne	James B. Weaver
Party	Republican	Democratic	Greenback
Popular vote	164,095	140,012	23,089
Percentage	50.15%	42.79%	7.06%
- County results Sherman: 40–50% 50–60% 60–70% 70–80% 80–90% Kinne: 30–40% 40–50% 50–60% 60–70% 70–80%
Governor before election
Buren R. Sherman
Republican
Elected Governor
Buren R. Sherman
Republican

The 1883 Iowa gubernatorial election was held on October 9, 1883. Incumbent Republican Buren R. Sherman defeated Democratic nominee L. G. Kinne with 50.15% of the vote.

== General election ==
=== Candidates ===
Major party candidates

- Buren R. Sherman, Republican
- L. G. Kinne, Democratic

Other candidates

- James B. Weaver, Greenback

=== Results ===
1883 Iowa gubernatorial election
Party	Candidate	Votes	%	±%
Republican	Buren R. Sherman (incumbent)	164,095	50.15%	
Democratic	L. G. Kinne	140,012	42.79%	
Greenback	James B. Weaver	23,089	7.06%	
Majority		24,083		
Turnout				
Republican hold		Swing		
