= Senator Walden =

Senator Walden may refer to:

- Greg Walden (born 1957), Oregon State Senate
- Madison Miner Walden (1836–1891), Iowa State Senate

== See also ==
- Alton Waldon (born 1936), New York State Senate
