= 1877 Iowa gubernatorial election =

- October 9, 1877
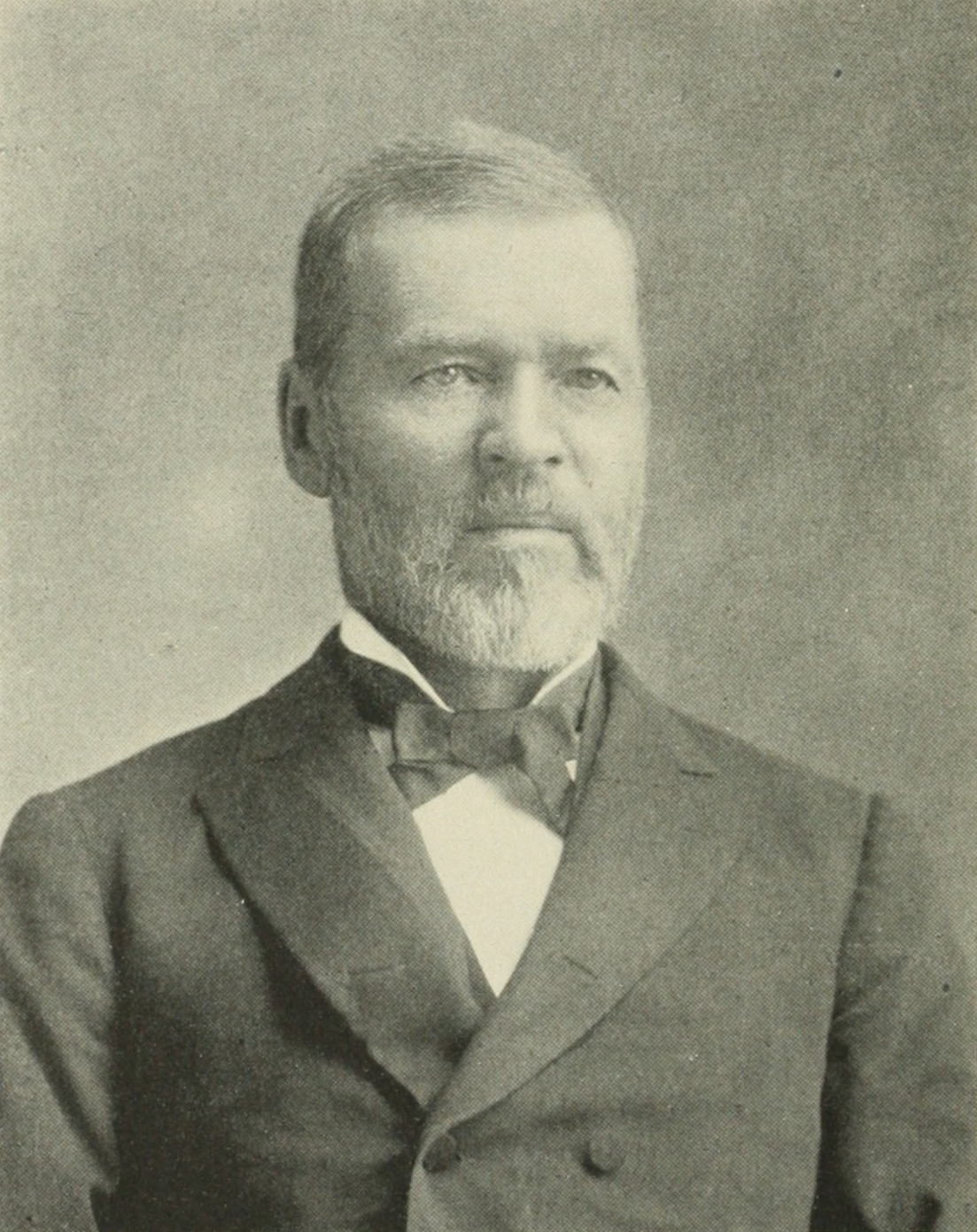

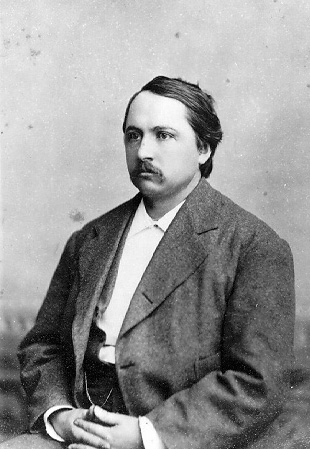

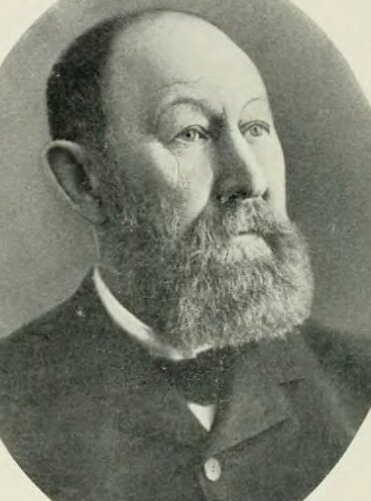
Nominee	John H. Gear	John P. Irish	Daniel P. Stubbs
Party	Republican	Democratic	Greenback
Popular vote	121,316	79,304	34,316
Percentage	49.39%	32.29%	13.97%
- County results Gear: 30–40% 40–50% 50–60% 60–70% 70–80% 80–90% 90–100% Irish: 30–40% 40–50% 50–60% 60–70% Stubbs: 50–60%
Governor before election
Joshua G. Newbold
Republican
Elected Governor
John H. Gear
Republican

The 1877 Iowa gubernatorial election was held on October 9, 1877. Republican nominee John H. Gear defeated Democratic nominee John P. Irish with 49.39% of the vote.

== General election ==
=== Candidates ===
Major party candidates

- John H. Gear, Republican
- John P. Irish, Democratic

Other candidates

- Daniel P. Stubbs, Greenback
- Elias Jessup, Prohibition

=== Results ===
1877 Iowa gubernatorial election
Party	Candidate	Votes	%	±%
Republican	John H. Gear	121,316	49.39%	
Democratic	John P. Irish	79,304	32.29%	
Greenback	Daniel P. Stubbs	34,316	13.97%	
Prohibition	Elias Jessup	10,565	4.30%	
Majority		42,012		
Turnout				
Republican hold		Swing		
