= List of lieutenant governors of Iowa =

This is a list of lieutenant governors of the U.S. state of Iowa. The state constitution describes the responsibilities of the position: "The lieutenant governor shall have the duties provided by law and those duties of the governor assigned to the lieutenant governor by the governor."

== History ==
Prior to 1990, the governor and lieutenant governor were elected in separate elections; since then they have run together on the same ticket.

== List ==
Image	Lt. Governor	Took office	Left office	Party	Governor(s) served under
	Oran Faville	1858	1860	Republican	Ralph P. Lowe
	Nicholas J. Rusch	1860	1862	Republican	Samuel J. Kirkwood
	John R. Needham	1862	1864	Republican	Samuel J. Kirkwood
	Enoch W. Eastman	1864	1866	Republican	William M. Stone
	Benjamin F. Gue	1866	1868	Republican	William M. Stone
	John Scott	1868	1870	Republican	Samuel Merrill
	Madison Miner Walden	1870	1871	Republican	Samuel Merrill
	Henry C. Bulis	1871	1874	Republican	Samuel Merrill
	Henry C. Bulis	1871	1874	Republican	Cyrus C. Carpenter
	Joseph Dysart	1874	1876	Republican	Cyrus C. Carpenter
	Joshua G. Newbold	1876	1877	Republican	Samuel Kirkwood
	Frank T. Campbell	1878	1882	Republican	John H. Gear
	Orlando H. Manning	1882	1886	Republican	Buren R. Sherman
	John A. T. Hull	1886	1890	Republican	William Larrabee
	Alfred N. Poyneer	1890	1892	Republican	Horace Boies
	Samuel L. Bestow	1892	1894	Democratic	Horace Boies
	Warren S. Dungan	1894	1896	Republican	Frank D. Jackson
	Matt Parrott	1896	1898	Republican	Francis M. Drake
	James C. Milliman	1898	1902	Republican	Leslie M. Shaw
	John Herriott	1902	1907	Republican	Albert B. Cummins
	Warren Garst	1907	1908	Republican	Albert B. Cummins
	George W. Clarke	1909	1913	Republican	Beryl F. Carroll
	William L. Harding	1913	1917	Republican	George W. Clarke
	Ernest Robert Moore	1917	1921	Republican	William L. Harding
	John Hammill	1921	1925	Republican	N. E. Kendall
	Clem F. Kimball	1925	1928	Republican	John Hammill
	Arch W. McFarlane	1928	1933	Republican	John Hammill
	Arch W. McFarlane	1928	1933	Republican	Daniel Webster Turner
	Nelson G. Kraschel	1933	1937	Democratic	Clyde L. Herring
	John K. Valentine	1937	1939	Democratic	Nelson G. Kraschel
	Bourke B. Hickenlooper	1939	1943	Republican	George A. Wilson
	Robert D. Blue	1943	1945	Republican	Bourke B. Hickenlooper
	Kenneth A. Evans	1945	1951	Republican	Robert D. Blue
	Kenneth A. Evans	1945	1951	Republican	William S. Beardsley
	William H. Nicholas	1951	1953	Republican	William S. Beardsley
	Leo Elthon	1953	1957	Republican	William S. Beardsley
	Leo Elthon	1953	1957	Republican	Leo A. Hoegh
	William H. Nicholas	1957	January 15, 1959	Republican	Herschel C. Loveless
	Edward J. McManus	January 15, 1959	January 12, 1961	Democratic	Herschel C. Loveless
	W. L. Mooty	January 12, 1961	January 17, 1965	Republican	Norman A. Erbe
	W. L. Mooty	January 12, 1961	January 17, 1965	Republican	Harold E. Hughes
	Robert D. Fulton	January 17, 1965	January 1, 1969	Democratic	Harold E. Hughes
	Roger Jepsen	January 16, 1969	January 18, 1973	Republican	Robert D. Ray
	Arthur A. Neu	January 18, 1973	January 12, 1979	Republican	Robert D. Ray
	Terry Branstad	January 12, 1979	January 14, 1983	Republican	Robert D. Ray
	Robert T. Anderson	January 14, 1983	January 16, 1987	Democratic	Terry Branstad
	Jo Ann Zimmerman	January 16, 1987	January 18, 1991	Democratic	Terry Branstad
	Joy Corning	January 18, 1991	January 15, 1999	Republican	Terry Branstad
	Sally Pederson	January 15, 1999	January 12, 2007	Democratic	Tom Vilsack
	Patty Judge	January 12, 2007	January 14, 2011	Democratic	Chet Culver
	Kim Reynolds	January 14, 2011	May 24, 2017	Republican	Terry Branstad
	Adam Gregg	January 18, 2019 (Note: Acting Lieutenant Governor; May 25, 2017 – January 18, 2019)	September 3, 2024	Republican	Kim Reynolds
	Amy Sinclair (Acting)	September 3, 2024 (Note: Acting Lieutenant Governor; September 3, 2024 – December 16, 2024)	December 16, 2024	Republican	Kim Reynolds
	Chris Cournoyer	December 16, 2024	Incumbent	Republican	Kim Reynolds
	Dave Muhlbauer	Elect, taking office on January 12, 2027		Democratic	Rob Sand

== See also ==
- List of governors of Iowa
