= Henry Hoffman Trimble =

American lawyer, businessman, and politician (1827–1910)

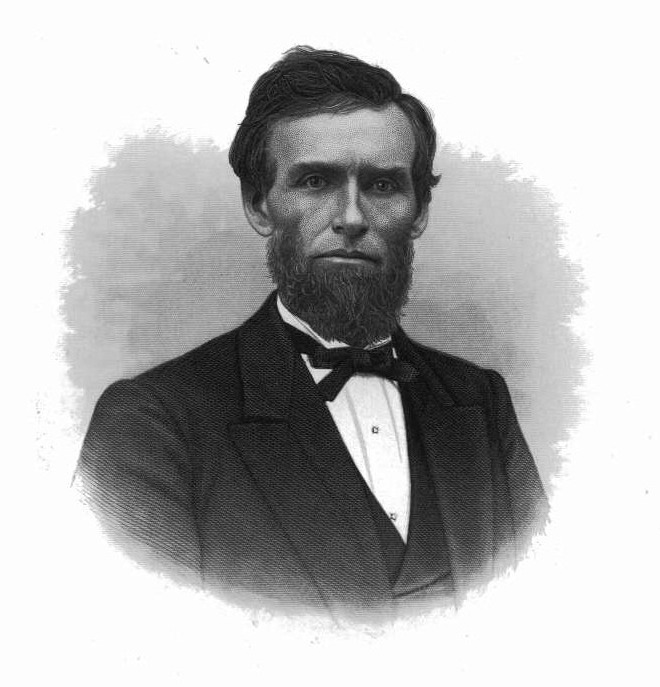

Member of the Iowa Senate from the 5th district
- In office December 1, 1856 – January 8, 1860
- Preceded by: Alvin Saunders
- Succeeded by: William E. Taylor

Personal details
- Born: May 3, 1827 Rush County, Indiana, U.S.
- Died: January 9, 1910 (aged 82) Keokuk, Iowa, U.S.
- Party: Democratic
- Spouse: Emma Carruthers (m. 1849)
- Children: 5
- Occupation: Lawyer; judge; politician

Military service
- Allegiance: United States; Union
- Branch/service: United States Army; Union Army
- Rank: Lieutenant colonel
- Battles/wars: Mexican–American War; American Civil War; Battle of Pea Ridge

Henry Hoffman Trimble (May 3, 1827 – January 9, 1910) was an American judge and politician.

== Early life ==
Trimble was born on May 3, 1827, and raised in Indiana, living in the counties of Rush, Decatur and Shelby. His father John was a carpenter, farmer, and merchant. Henry Trimble was a student at Franklin College and Indiana University–Bloomington, before graduating from Asbury College in 1847. Trimble subsequently joined the United States Army and served in the Mexican–American War with the 5th Indiana Volunteers, led by James Henry Lane.

== Legal and political career ==
After the Mexican–American War, Trimble read law with Eden H. Davis and Thomas A. Hendricks. Trimble moved to Iowa in November 1849, following his father, who had relocated the previous year. In Iowa, Trimble continued the study of law with John F. Kinney of Keosauqua, and passed the bar in April 1850. Trimble served as Davis County attorney from his base in Bloomfield between 1851 and 1855, when he was elected to the Iowa Senate for District 5. In the midst of his only term on the Iowa General Assembly, Trimble ran in the 1858–59 United States House of Representatives elections, losing to Samuel Ryan Curtis. Trimble left the state senate in 1860, and served in the Union Army as a lieutenant colonel of the 3rd Iowa Cavalry Regiment from 1861 to 1862. During the American Civil War, he was wounded in the Battle of Pea Ridge and discharged. Upon his return to Iowa, Trimble was elected to a district judgeship in the second district, serving for four years. In 1865, he was the Democratic candidate for election to the Iowa Supreme Court. Trimble lost the United States Senate election the following year to James Harlan, as well as his district judgeship. Later that year, he was elected a director of the Saint Louis and Cedar Rapids Railway Company, and became president of the railway company in September 1868. Trimble contested the 1872–73 United States House of Representatives elections for both the Liberal Republicans and the Democrats, losing to William Loughridge. Trimble supported Greenback candidate James B. Weaver in the 1878 United States House of Representatives elections, but did not receive Greenback support in the next election cycle, losing the 1879 Iowa gubernatorial election to John H. Gear. Trimble later moved to Keokuk, where he continued to practice law, primarily representing the Chicago, Burlington and Quincy Railroad. He attended the 1876, 1880, and 1884 Democratic National Conventions.

== Personal life ==
Trimble married Emma Carruthers in 1849. The couple raised five children. He died in Keokuk on January 9, 1910.
