= Orlando H. Manning =

American politician (1847–1909)

12th Lieutenant Governor of Iowa
- In office 1882–1886
- Governor: Buren R. Sherman
- Preceded by: Frank T. Campbell
- Succeeded by: John A. T. Hull

Member of the Iowa House of Representatives from the 42nd district
- In office 1876–1880

Personal details
- Born: Orlando Harrison Manning; May 18, 1847 Abington, Indiana, U.S.
- Died: September 19, 1909 (aged 62) Atlantic City, New Jersey, U.S.
- Party: Republican
- Profession: Lawyer

Orlando Harrison Manning (May 18, 1847 – September 19, 1909) was an American politician.

Born in Abington, Indiana, Manning moved with his family to Iowa. He eventually studied law and settled in Carroll, Iowa, to practice law. Manning served in the Iowa House of Representatives 1876-1880 and as Lieutenant Governor of Iowa 1882–1886 serving under Governor Buren R. Sherman. Later he practiced law in Denver, Colorado, Topeka, Kansas, Chicago, Illinois, and New York City. He died in Atlantic City, New Jersey.

Orlando H. Manning is the namesake of Manning, Iowa.

Political offices
Preceded by Frank T. Campbell	Lieutenant Governor of Iowa; 1882–1886	Succeeded by John A. T. Hull
