= Joseph Dysart =

American politician (1820–1893)

9th Lieutenant Governor of Iowa
- In office 1874–1876
- Governor: Cyrus C. Carpenter
- Preceded by: Henry C. Bulis
- Succeeded by: Joshua G. Newbold

Member of the Iowa State Senate
- In office 1861–1864
- In office 1870–1874

Personal details
- Born: July 8, 1820 Huntingdon, Pennsylvania
- Died: September 8, 1893 (aged 73)

Joseph Dysart (July 8, 1820 – September 8, 1893) was an American farmer and politician.

Born in Huntingdon, Pennsylvania, Dysart moved to Iowa and eventually settled in the community of Dysart, Iowa, which was named after him. Dysart was a farmer; he served in the Iowa State Senate from 1861 to 1864 and from 1870 to 1874. He was elected Lieutenant Governor of Iowa in 1873. He died in Dysart, Iowa.

== Notes ==
Political offices
Preceded by Henry C. Bulis	Lieutenant Governor of Iowa; 1874–1876	Succeeded by Joshua G. Newbold
