= Josiah B. Grinnell =

American politician, minister, educator, and abolitionist (1821–1891)

Josiah Bushnell Grinnell
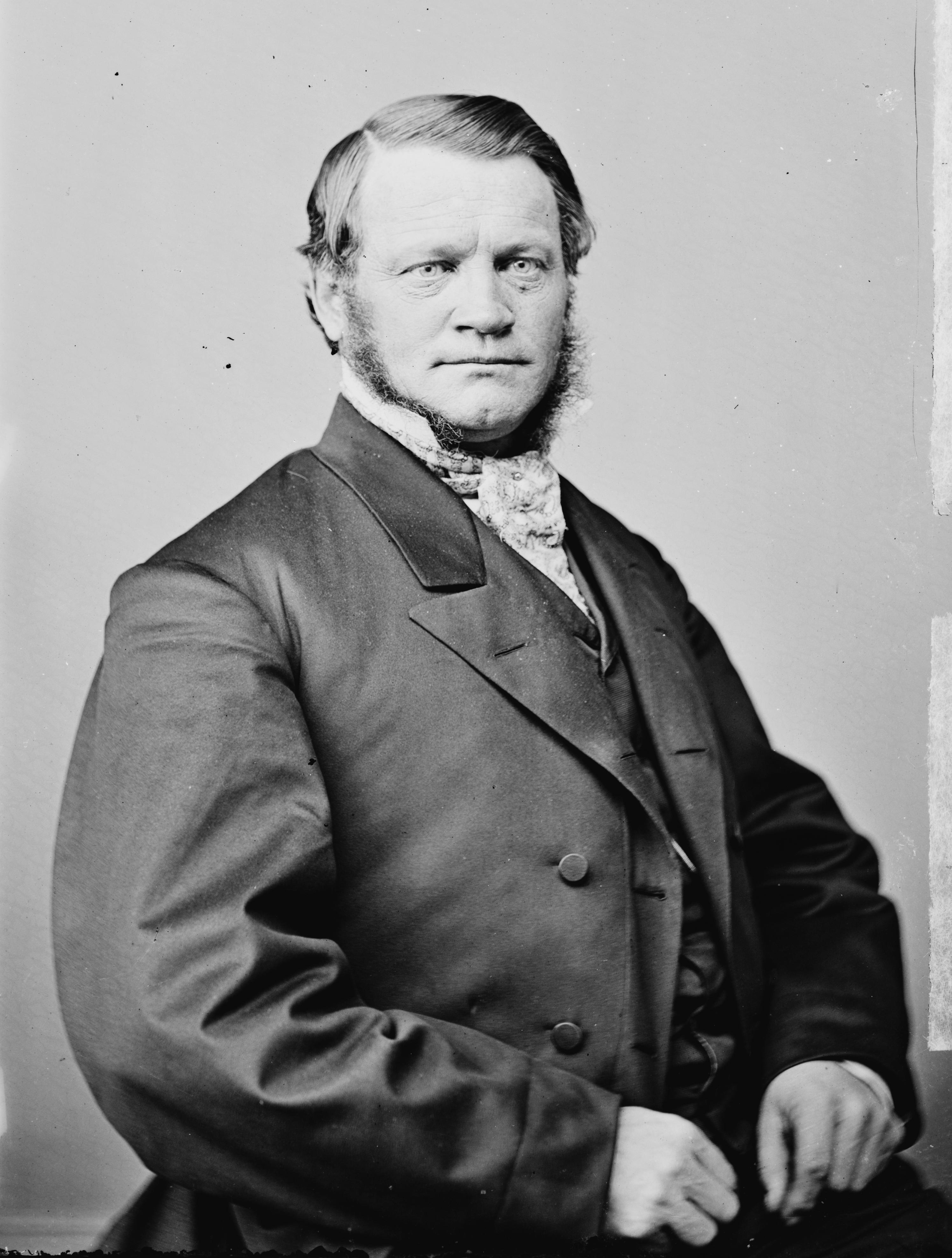

Member of the U.S. House of Representatives from Iowa's 4th district
- In office March 4, 1863 – March 3, 1867
- Preceded by: Constituency established
- Succeeded by: William Loughridge

Member of the Iowa Senate
- In office 1856–1860

Personal details
- Born: Josiah Bushnell Grinnell; December 22, 1821 New Haven, Vermont, U.S.
- Died: March 31, 1891 (aged 69) Grinnell, Iowa, U.S.
- Party: Republican
- Spouse: Julia Chapin
- Education: Oneida Institute; Auburn Theological Seminary (BA)
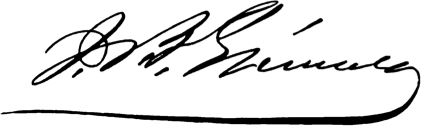
- Signature

Josiah Bushnell Grinnell (December 22, 1821 – March 31, 1891) was a U.S. congressman from Iowa's 4th congressional district, an ordained Congregational minister, radical abolitionist, one of the founders of Grinnell, Iowa and benefactor of Grinnell College.

Grinnell was born in New Haven, Vermont, in 1821. He studied first at Oneida Institute starting in 1841. He graduated from Auburn Theological Seminary in New York City in 1847. He held pastorates in Washington, D.C., and New York City before moving to Iowa.

Although Grinnell claimed to be the young man to whom Horace Greeley is quoted as having given the famous advice, "Go West, young man," Greeley always denied telling anyone that phrase. Grinnell was also involved in railway building and was instrumental in the move of Grinnell College, known at the time as Iowa College, from Davenport to the newly established town of Grinnell.

Grinnell married Julia Ann Chapin on February 4, 1852. They had four children: Catharine Hastings Grinnell, George Chapin Grinnell, Mary Chapin Grinnell, and Carrie Holmes Grinnell.

In Iowa, Grinnell was elected to the Iowa Senate, where he served from 1856 to 1860. At the same time, he studied law, was admitted to the bar in 1858, and set up his legal practice in Grinnell. He was a delegate to the 1860 Republican National Convention that nominated Abraham Lincoln for President.

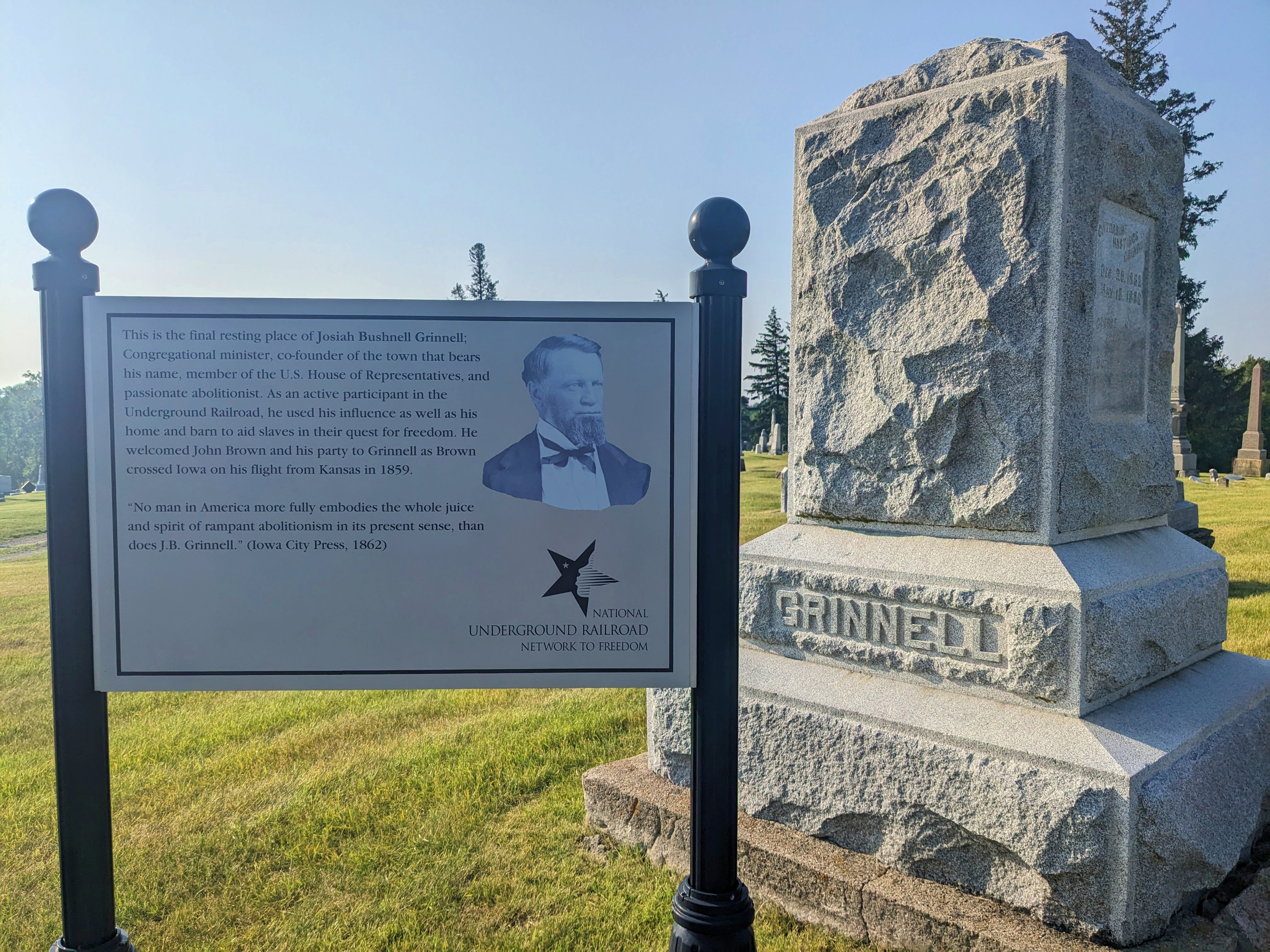
The marker for the National Underground Railroad Network to Freedom stands next to the Grinnell tombstone at Hazelwood Cemetery in Grinnell, Iowa.

Grinnell was also a 'conductor' on the Underground Railroad and was associated with John Brown. He provided shelter to John Brown in 1859 after Brown's anti-slavery raids in Kansas and Missouri. The gravesite of J.B. Grinnell is listed on the National Underground Railroad Network to Freedom.

In 1862, after the 1860 census increased the number of U.S. House seats in Iowa from two to six, Grinnell ran for the newly created seat representing Iowa's 4th congressional district. The Fourth District was then a diamond-shaped configuration of twelve counties that included Newton and Iowa City, and ran from the Missouri border to the southern edge of Waterloo. After winning the Republican nomination and the general election in 1862, he served in the Thirty-eighth Congress. In 1864 he won re-election, serving in the Thirty-ninth Congress. On June 14, 1866, he was assaulted by fellow congressman Lovell Rousseau for insulting him and his home state of Kentucky during a House debate.

Grinnell lost the Republican nomination for a third term, losing by thirteen votes to Judge William Loughridge in June 1866.

After his service in Congress, Grinnell resumed the practice of law. He was also interested in the building of railroads, becoming a director of the Rock Island Railroad, and receiver of the Iowa Central Railroad (later the St. Louis & St. Paul Railroad). He also served as president of the Iowa State Horticultural Society and of the First National Bank in Grinnell.

He died of throat disease, complicated by asthma, at his home in Grinnell on March 31, 1891. He was interred in Hazelwood Cemetery.

== Works ==
- Grinnell, J. B. (1891). Men and Events of Forty Years: Autobiographical Reminiscences of an active career from 1850 to 1890. Boston: D. Lothrop.

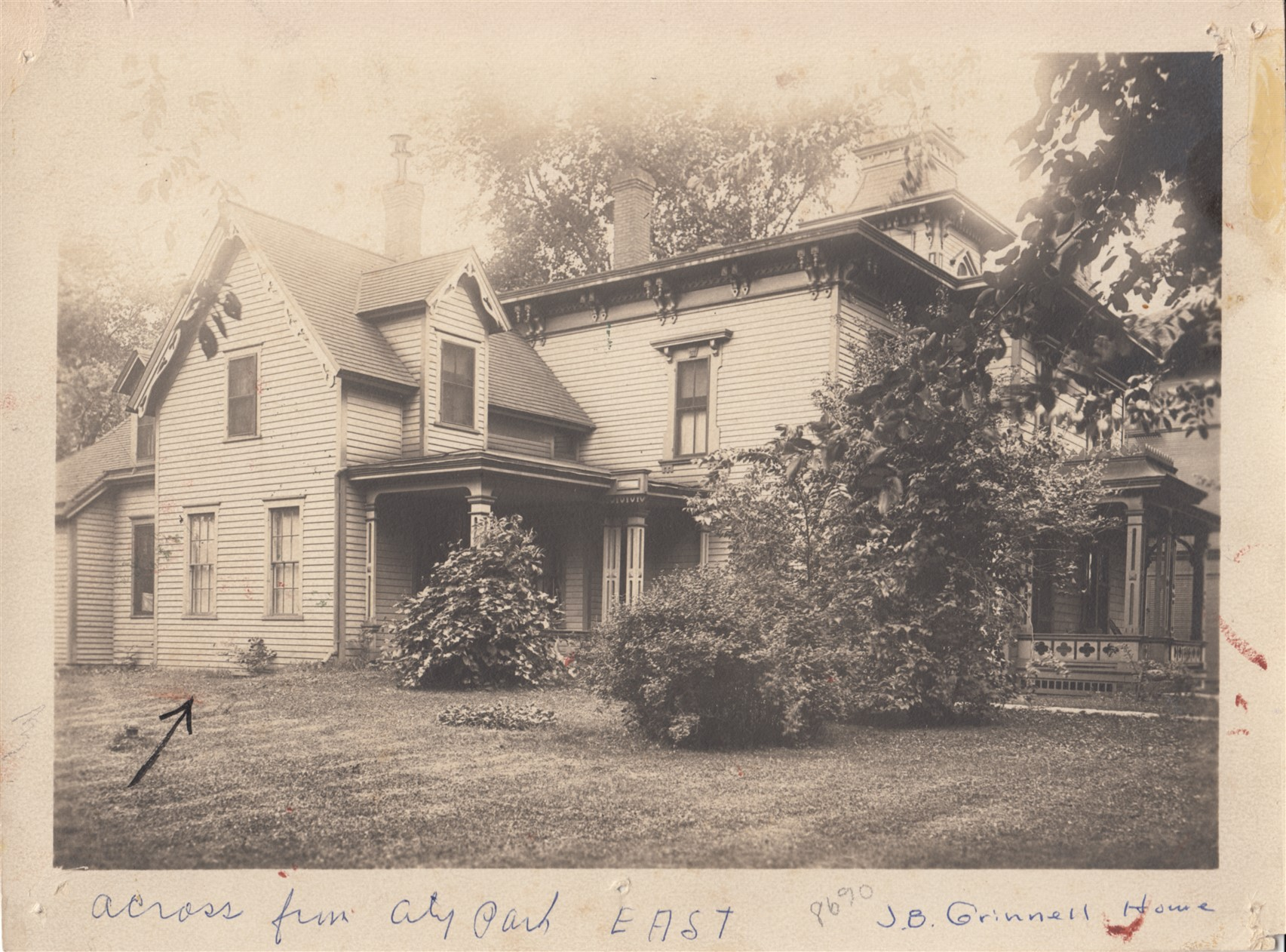
The home of J.B. Grinnell sat east of Central Park. This 1870 photo includes an arrow pointing to the room said to be where John Brown stayed when he came through town in 1859 with a dozen formerly enslaved persons making their way to freedom on via the Underground Railroad network.

Articles on his life, abolitionist activities and his obituary are available from Drake Community Library in Grinnell, Iowa. Many additional materials are available in the archives and local history website at Drake Community Library.

== See also ==
- List of members of the United States Congress killed or wounded in office

U.S. House of Representatives
New constituency	Member of the U.S. House of Representatives from Iowa's 4th congressional district 1863–1867	Succeeded by William Loughridge
