= Henry C. Bulis =

American politician

Postmaster of Decorah
- In office 1890–1894

Mayor of Decorah
- In office 1880-1881
- In office 1889-1890

8th Lieutenant Governor of Iowa
- In office 1871–1874
- Governor: Samuel Merrill; Cyrus C. Carpenter
- Preceded by: Madison Miner Walden
- Succeeded by: Joseph Dysart

Member of the Iowa Senate from Winneshiek County
- In office January 8, 1866 – March 3, 1871

Personal details
- Born: November 14, 1830 Clinton County, New York, U.S.
- Died: September 7, 1897 (aged 66) Decorah, Iowa

Henry Clay Bulis (November 14, 1830 – September 7, 1897) was an American politician and physician.

Born in Clinton County, New York, Bulis studied medicine. He moved to Decorah, Iowa, where he practiced medicine. Bulis was an Indian agent. He also served as mayor of Decorah and was postmaster. Between 1866 and 1871, he held an Iowa Senate seat, representing District 42 as a Republican. He resigned from the state senate and served as Lieutenant Governor of Iowa until 1874. He died in Decorah.

== Notes ==
Political offices
| Preceded by Madison Miner Walden | Lieutenant Governor of Iowa; 1871–1874 | Succeeded by Joseph Dysart |
