= John J. Seerley =

American politician from Iowa (1852–1931)

John Joseph Seerley
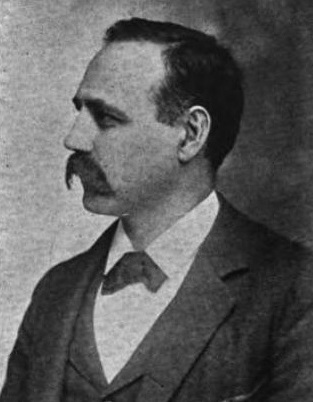
- From Volume II (1894) of Biographies and Portraits of the Progressive Men of Iowa

Member of the U.S. House of Representatives from Iowa's 1st district
- In office March 4, 1891 – March 3, 1893
- Preceded by: John H. Gear
- Succeeded by: John H. Gear

Personal details
- Born: March 13, 1852 Toulon, Illinois, U.S.
- Died: February 23, 1931 (aged 78) Burlington, Iowa, U.S.
- Resting place: Aspin Grove Cemetery
- Party: Democratic
- Children: John Joseph Seerley Jr.
- Education: University of Iowa College of Law

John Joseph Seerley (March 13, 1852 – February 23, 1931) was a one-term Democratic U.S. Representative from Iowa's 1st congressional district in southeastern Iowa.

Born on a farm near Toulon, Illinois, Seerley moved to Iowa in 1854 with his parents, who settled on a farm in Keokuk County.

He attended the common schools, and graduated from the University of Iowa at Iowa City in 1875.

While serving as principal of Iowa City High School in 1876, he enrolled in the University of Iowa College of Law, graduating in 1877.

He was admitted to the bar in 1877 and commenced practice in Burlington, Iowa.

He served as City solicitor of Burlington from 1885 to 1890.

In 1888, he won the Democratic nomination to challenge incumbent Republican Representative John H. Gear, who was seeking re-election to a second term representing Iowa's 1st district. This would be the first of three consecutive races between the two. Gear won the 1888 general election. Two years later, however, Seerley unseated Gear as part of the 1890 democratic landslide, becoming one of six Democratic U.S. House members from Iowa in the Fifty-second Congress. In 1892, however, Gear again ran against Seerley. Like all four Democratic freshmen from Iowa, Seerley lost his bid for re-election. He served in Congress from March 4, 1891 to March 3, 1893.

Seerley resumed the practice of law in Burlington, serving again as City solicitor from 1893 to 1895. He was also interested in banking and agricultural pursuits. He remained active in Democratic Party activities, serving as a delegate to the 1920 Democratic National Convention.

Seerley died in Burlington, on February 23, 1931. He was interred in Aspin Grove Cemetery.

His son and namesake, Major John Joseph Seerley Jr. (1897–1943) served with distinction in World War I and World War II, losing his life while serving in the latter.

He was the grandfather of George Irving Bell.

== See also ==
- List of World War I flying aces from the United States

U.S. House of Representatives
| Preceded by John H. Gear | Member of the U.S. House of Representatives from Iowa's 1st congressional district 1891–1893 | Succeeded by John H. Gear |
