= 1879 Iowa gubernatorial election =

- October 14, 1879
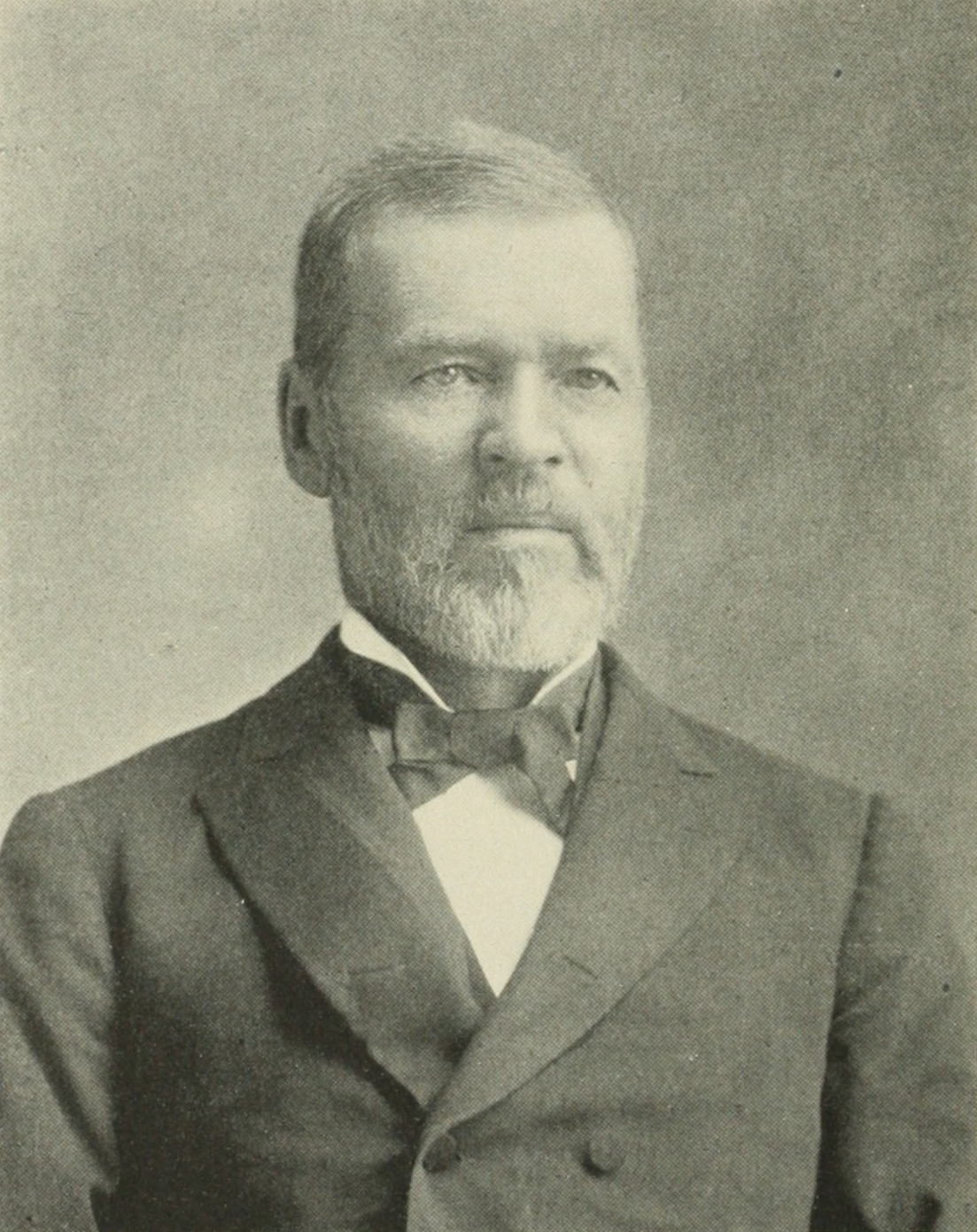

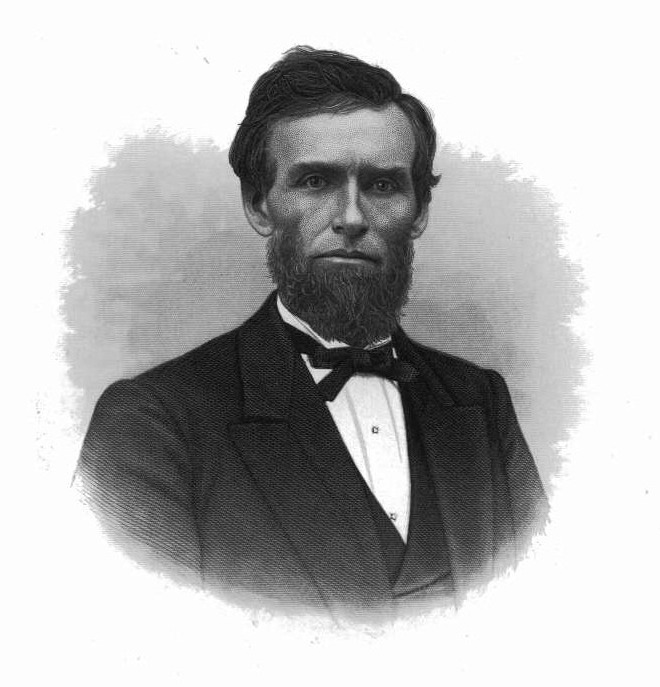

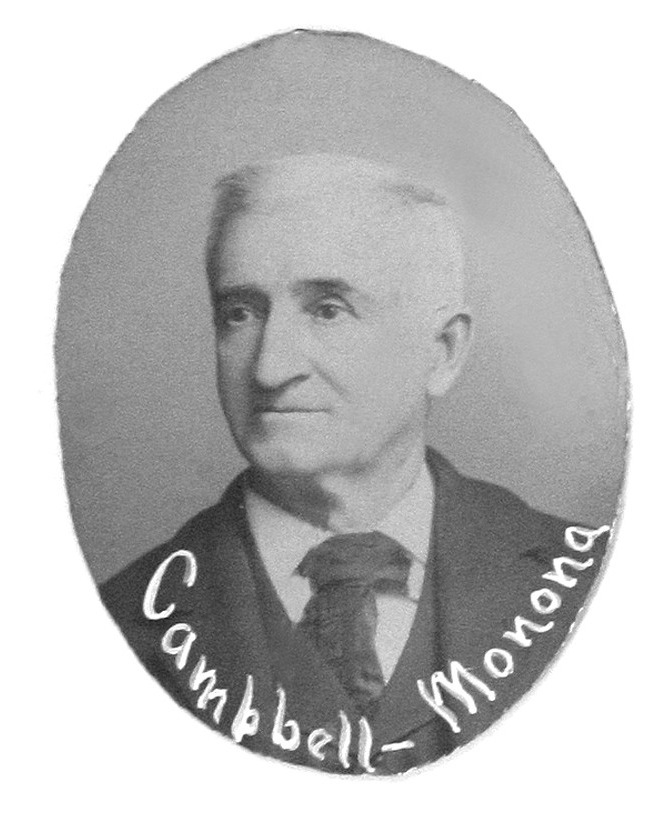
Nominee	John H. Gear	Henry Hoffman Trimble	Daniel Campbell
Party	Republican	Democratic	Greenback
Popular vote	157,408	85,364	45,674
Percentage	53.94%	29.25%	15.65%
- County results Gear: 30–40% 40–50% 50–60% 60–70% 70–80% 80–90% >90% Trimble: 40–50% 50–60% Campbell: 30–40% 50–60%
Governor before election
John H. Gear
Republican
Elected Governor
John H. Gear
Republican

The 1879 Iowa gubernatorial election was held on October 14, 1879. Incumbent Republican John H. Gear defeated Democratic nominee Henry Hoffman Trimble with 53.94% of the vote.

== General election ==
=== Candidates ===
Major party candidates

- John H. Gear, Republican
- Henry Hoffman Trimble, Democratic

Other candidates

- Daniel Campbell, Greenback
- David R. Dungan, Prohibition

=== Results ===
1879 Iowa gubernatorial election
Party	Candidate	Votes	%	±%
Republican	John H. Gear (incumbent)	157,408	53.94%	
Democratic	Henry Hoffman Trimble	85,364	29.25%	
Greenback	Daniel Campbell	45,674	15.65%	
Prohibition	David R. Dungan	3,291	1.13%	
Majority		72,044		
Turnout				
Republican hold		Swing		
