= Buren R. Sherman =

American politician

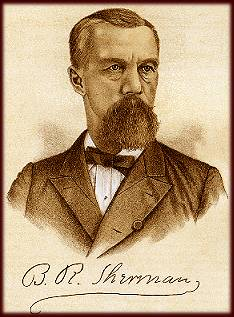

12th Governor of Iowa
- In office January 12, 1882 – January 14, 1886
- Lieutenant: Orlando H. Manning
- Preceded by: John H. Gear
- Succeeded by: William Larrabee

8th State Auditor of Iowa
- In office 1874–1881
- Governor: Samuel J. Kirkwood; Joshua G. Newbold; John H. Gear
- Preceded by: John Russell
- Succeeded by: William V. Lucas

Benton County Judge
- In office 1865–1866

Personal details
- Born: Buren Robinson Sherman; May 28, 1836 Phelps, New York, U.S.
- Died: November 11, 1904 (aged 68) Vinton, Iowa
- Party: Republican
- Spouse: Lena Kendall
- Children: 2
- Education: University of Iowa

Military service
- Allegiance: United States
- Branch/service: Union Army
- Years of service: 1861-1863
- Rank: Captain
- Unit: 13th Iowa Volunteer Infantry Regiment
- Battles/wars: American Civil War; Battle of Shiloh

Buren Robinson Sherman (May 28, 1836 – November 11, 1904) was the 12th governor of Iowa, serving from 1882 to 1886.

== Early life ==
Sherman was born in Phelps, New York, on May 28, 1836 to Phineas L. and Eveline (Robinson) Sherman. He studied law after his family moved to Iowa in 1855 and was admitted to the bar in 1859. Sherman then practiced law in Vinton, Iowa in 1860 to 1861. In 1860, he joined William Smyth, a former District Judge, and JC Traer in the creation of Smyth, Traer, and Sherman Law firm.

== Military service ==
He signed up in 1861 with the 13th Iowa Volunteer Infantry Regiment Company G for the Union Army, retiring as a captain in mid-1863 after being injured at the Battle of Shiloh.

== Political career ==
=== Judicial career ===
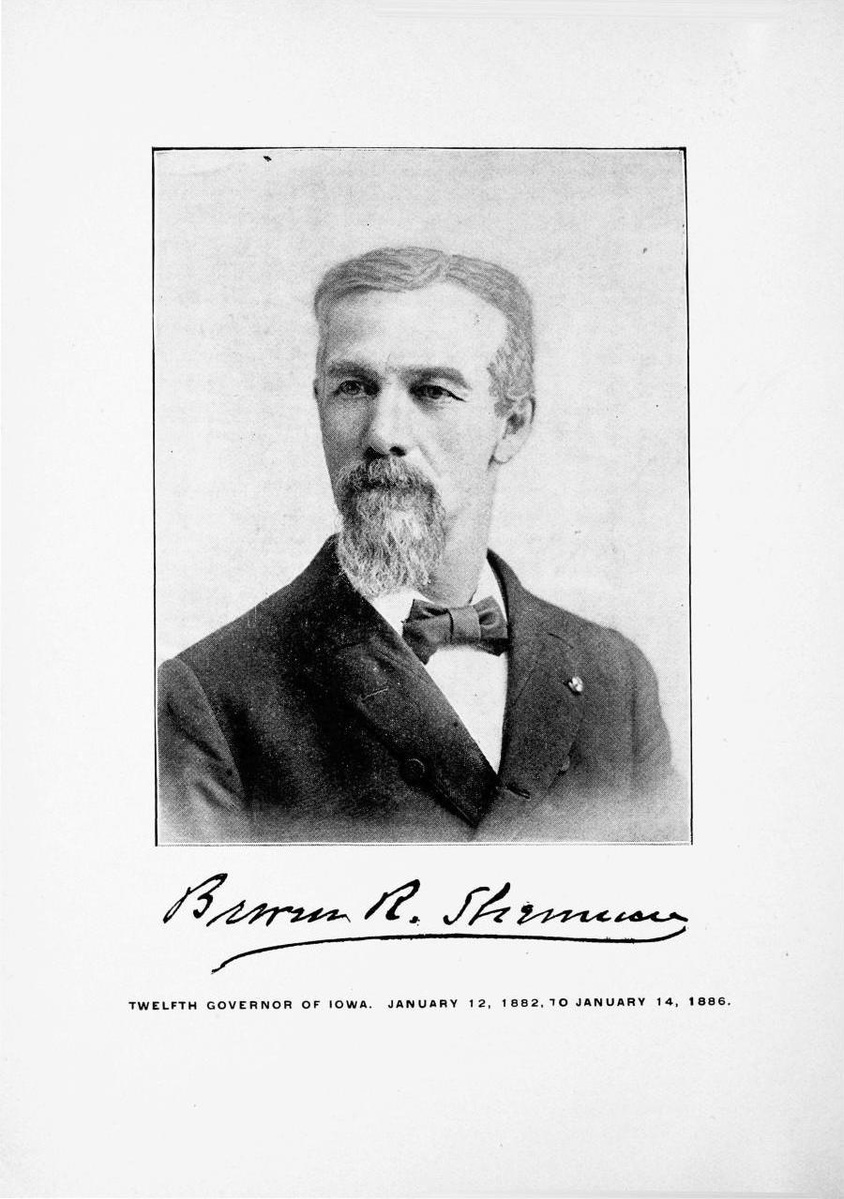
Sherman in the 1900 Iowa Official Register

Sherman was elected county judge of Benton County upon his return, serving from 1865 to 1866. He resigned this position to accept a position in the office of the clerk of the district court.

=== State Auditor ===
In 1874 he ran for State Auditor of Iowa, that he was elected by a majority of 28,425 over J. M. King, an "anti-monopoly" candidate. In 1876, he was reelected, receiving 50,272 more votes than W. Growneweg, of the Democratic Party, and Leonard Browne, of the Greenback Party. In 1878, he was reelected, receiving majority of 7,164 over the combine votes of Colonel Eiboeck, of the Democratic Party, and G. V. Swearenger, of the Greenback Party.

=== Governorship ===
Sherman was elected Governor of Iowa in 1882, Sherman received 133,330 votes, against 83,244 for Kinne and 28,112 for D. M. Clark. He was the first occupant of the governor's office in the Iowa State Capitol. However, it was his successor, William Larrabee, who first occupied the office for a full term. In 1883, he ran for a second term, resulting in vote totals of: Sherman, 164,182; Kinne, 139,093; Weaver, 23,089.

During his terms, several new state agencies were authorized, including the state veterinary surgeon office, state bureau of labor statistics and a state oil inspector office. The Iowa legislature also passed, and Sherman signed, an alcohol prohibition act as well as several tax reform bills.

== Personal life ==
In 1885, he was awarded an LL.D. from the University of Iowa. He was also a freemason who was especially active in Scottish Rite Masonry and helped found the Des Moines Scottish Rite Consistory.

He married Lena Kendall on August 20, 1862 and they had two children.

Sherman died November 11, 1904, and is buried in the Evergreen Cemetery in Vinton, Iowa.

Party political offices
Preceded by John H. Gear	Republican nominee Governor of Iowa; 1881, 1883	Succeeded by William Larrabee
Political offices
Preceded by John Russell	State Auditor of Iowa; 1874–1881	Succeeded by William V. Lucas
Preceded by John H. Gear	Governor of Iowa; January 12, 1882 – January 14, 1886	Succeeded by William Larrabee
