= Frank T. Campbell =

American politician and businessman

Iowa Railroad Commissioner
- In office 1888–1892
- Governor: William Larrabee; Horace Boies
- Preceded by: Lorenzo S. Coffin
- Succeeded by: George W. Perkins

11th Lieutenant Governor of Iowa
- In office 1878–1882
- Governor: John H. Gear
- Preceded by: Joshua G. Newbold
- Succeeded by: Orlando H. Manning

Member of the Iowa Senate
- In office January 10, 1870 – January 13, 1878
- Constituency: 28th District (1870-1874); 27th District (1874-1878)

Personal details
- Born: May 8, 1836 Ohio
- Died: March 6, 1907 (aged 70) Lima, Ohio

Frank T. Campbell (May 8, 1836 – March 6, 1907) was an American politician and businessman.

Born in Ohio, Campbell moved to Newton, Iowa and was in the newspaper and insurance business. He served in the Union Army during the American Civil War. He was a two-term member of the Iowa Senate from 1870 to 1878, first for District 27 and then for District 28, and subsequently served as Lieutenant Governor of Iowa under Governor John H. Gear. Later he was appointed Railroad Commissioner of Iowa. He died in Lima, Ohio.

== Notes ==
Political offices
Preceded by Joshua G. Newbold	Lieutenant Governor of Iowa; 1878–1882	Succeeded by Orlando H. Manning
