= David M. Clark (politician) =

American politician (1824–1907)

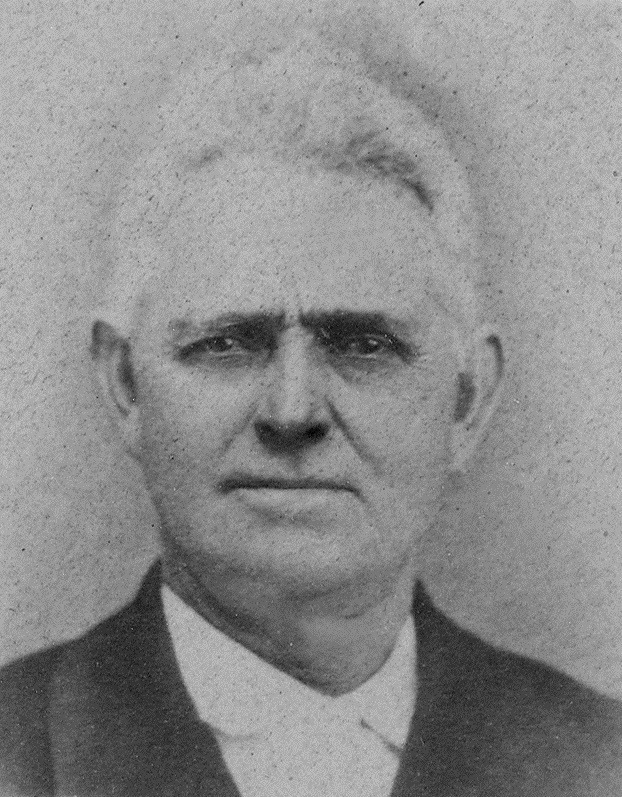

Member of the Iowa Senate from the 4th district
- In office January 12, 1880 – January 13, 1884
- Preceded by: Henry Laurens Dashiell
- Succeeded by: Thomas Weidman

Personal details
- Born: July 25, 1824 Scott County, Indiana, U.S.
- Died: June 25, 1907 (aged 82) Fredonia, Kansas, U.S.
- Party: Democratic
- Other political affiliations: Greenback; Republican
- Occupation: Politician, farmer

David M. Clark (July 25, 1824 – June 25, 1907) was an American politician.

Clark was born on July 25, 1824, in Scott County, Indiana. He visited Iowa in 1841 and 1845, before moving to Wapello County in 1849, where he farmed until 1863. That year, Clark moved to New York, Iowa, and established another farm.

Throughout the American Civil War, Clark supported the Republican Party. In 1877, he joined the Greenback Party. While affiliated with the Greenbacks, Clark served a single term on the Iowa Senate for District 4, from 1880 to 1884. During his tenure as a state senator, Clark contested the 1881 Iowa gubernatorial election, and the 1884–85 United States Senate elections. He later joined the Democratic Party.

Clark retired to Fredonia, Kansas, where he died on June 25, 1907.
