= Cambridge American Cemetery and Memorial =

ABMC war grave cemetery in England

- American Battle Monuments Commission
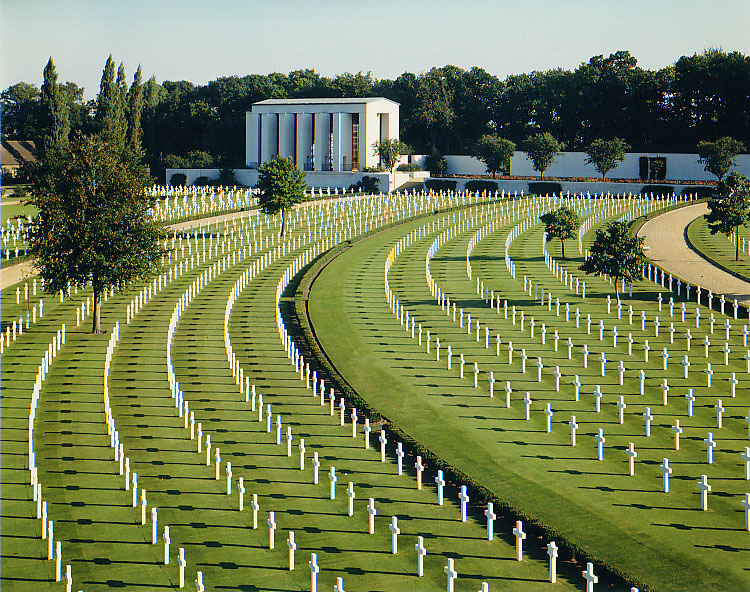
- Cambridge American Cemetery headstones, with the memorial building behind.
- Used for those deceased 1941–1945
- Established: 1943
- Location: 52.2161°N 0.0538°E near Cambridge, England
- Designed by: Perry, Shaw, Hepburn and Dean (architects); Olmsted Brothers (landscaping)
- Total burials: 3,812
- Unknowns: 24

Burials by war
- World War II 3,812

Cambridge American Cemetery and Memorial is a World War II American military war grave cemetery, lying between the villages of Coton and Madingley, 7 km (4.3 mi) north-west of Cambridge, England. The cemetery, dedicated in 1956, contains 3,811 American war dead and covers 30.5 acres (12.3 ha). It is one of 26 overseas military cemeteries administered by the American Battle Monuments Commission (ABMC).

The memorial is listed Grade II* on the National Heritage List for England.

== The cemetery ==
In 1943, the University of Cambridge gave 30.5 acres of land on the north slope of Madingley Hill to the American military forces for use as a temporary cemetery during World War II. After the war, the American Battle Monuments Commission chose Cambridge as the site for America's permanent World War II cemetery and war memorial in the United Kingdom. America's war dead from three temporary cemeteries in the British Isles were consolidated in the Cambridge cemetery during an extensive cemetery construction project, and simultaneously the United States government repatriated about 58% of the existing war dead at the request of their surviving family members. Cambridge American Cemetery and Memorial was dedicated on 16 July 1956.

The cemetery contains 3,809 headstones, with the remains of 3,812 servicemen, including airmen who died over Europe and sailors from North Atlantic convoys. The inscribed Wall of the Missing includes four representative statues of servicemen, sculpted by American artist Wheeler Williams. The wall records the names of 5,127 missing servicemen, most of whom died in the Battle of the Atlantic and in the strategic air bombardment of northwest Europe.

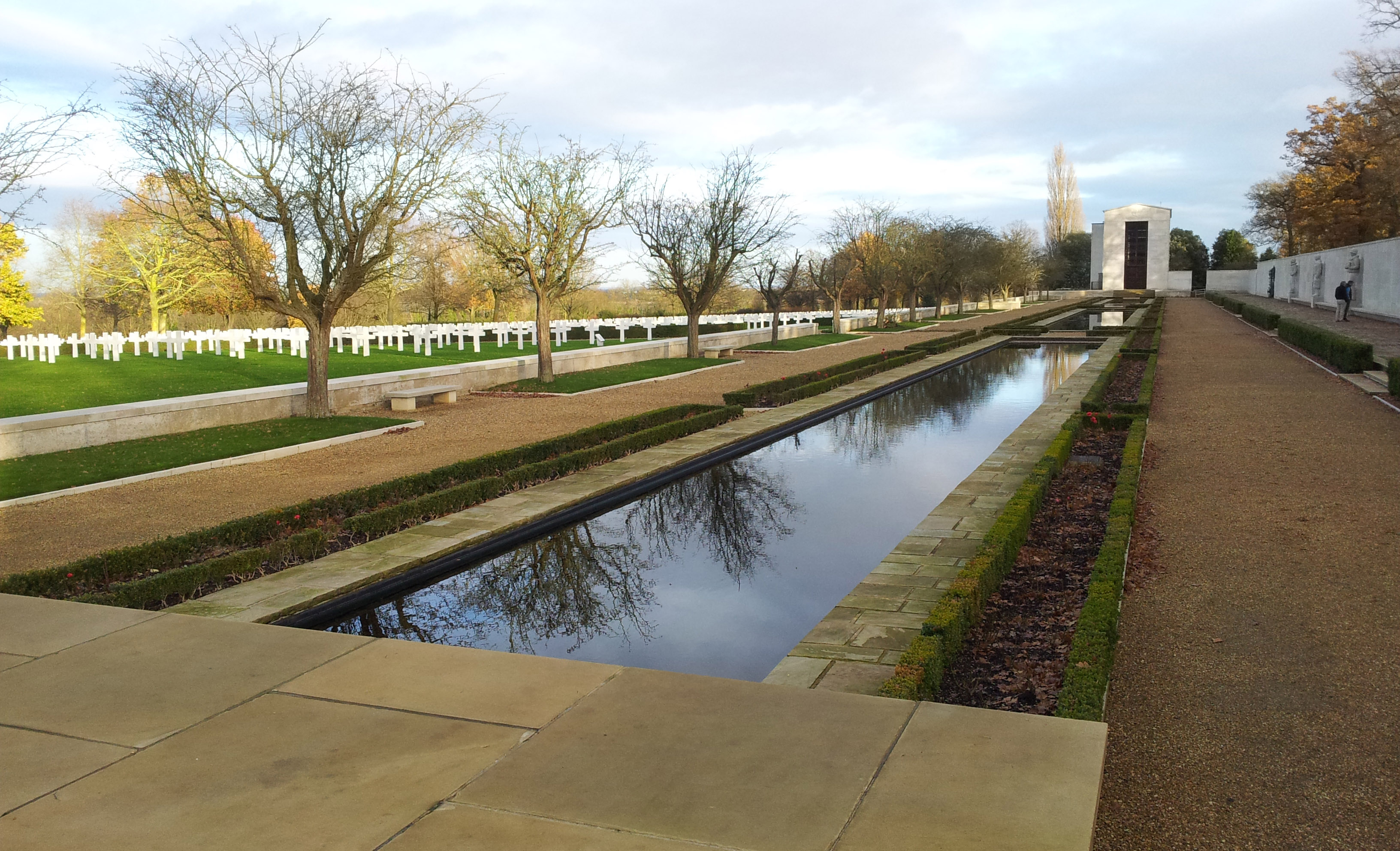
Reflecting pool leading to the chapel, with the memorial wall on the right.

Besides personnel of the United States armed forces there are also buried 18 members of the British Commonwealth armed services, who were American citizens serving chiefly in the Royal Air Force and Air Transport Auxiliary, besides an officer of the Royal Canadian Air Force and another of the British Royal Armoured Corps, whose graves are registered and maintained by the Commonwealth War Graves Commission.

In May 2014, a new visitor centre opened, containing exhibits about some of the people buried or commemorated at the cemetery, and the wider World War II campaigns in which they were involved.

== Notable burials and memorials ==
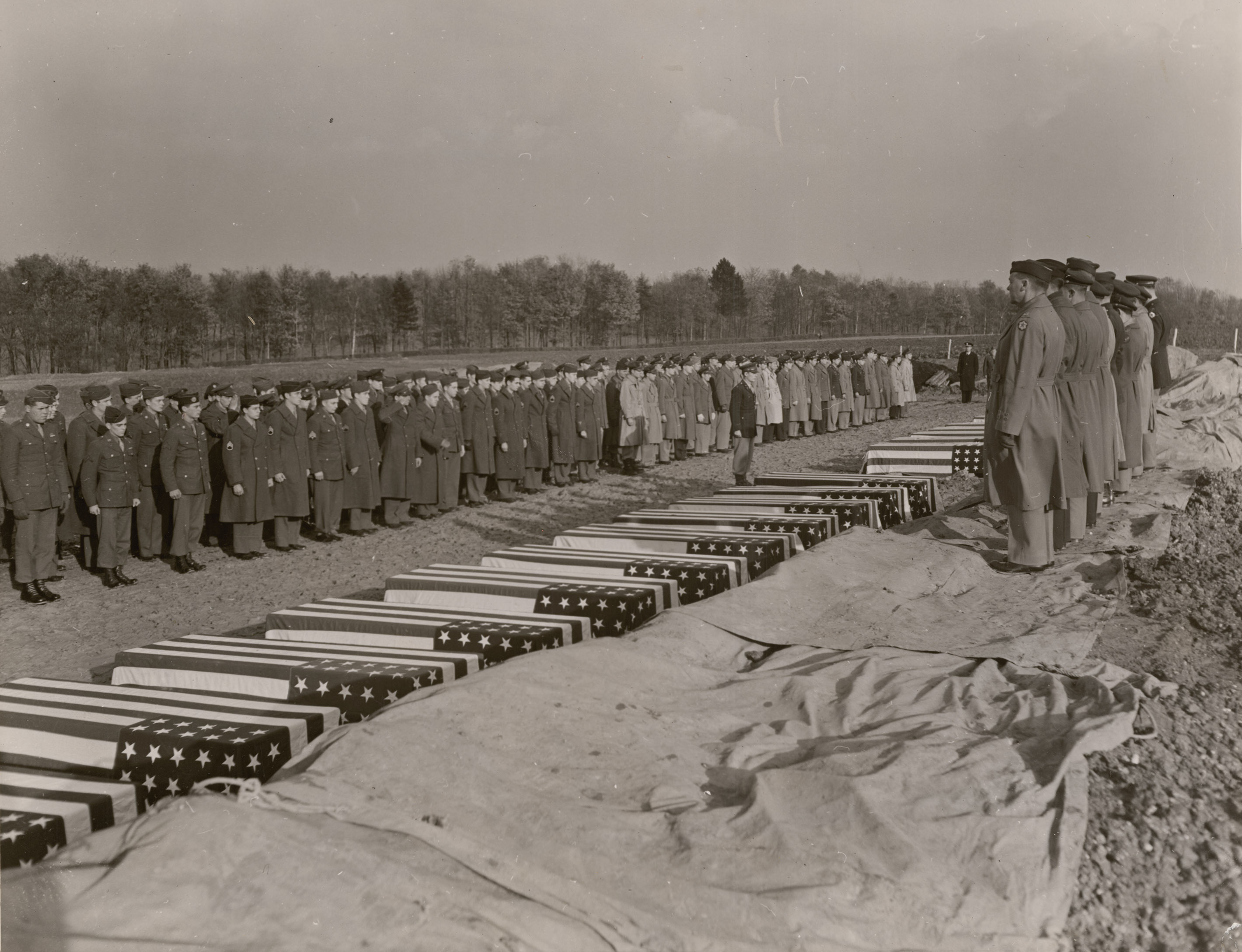
Flag-draped coffins of American soldiers at a military funeral ceremony at the cemetery

- John Martin Howard (1917–1942), US Navy officer – (memorial – buried at sea)
- John Joseph Seerley Jr. (1897–1943), pilot in both World War One and World War Two
- Vincent F. Harrington (1903–1943), US Representative and US Army Air Forces officer
- Glenn Miller (1904–1944), jazz bandleader and trombonist (memorial – lost at sea)
- Damon Jesse Gause (1915–1944), fighter pilot
- Joseph P. Kennedy Jr. (1915–1944), eldest son of Joseph P. Kennedy Sr. and Rose Fitzgerald (memorial – lost at sea)
- Leon Vance (1916–1944), US Army Air Forces pilot and Medal of Honor recipient (memorial – lost at sea)
- Three of the crew of USAAF B-17 Flying Fortress Mi Amigo, which crashed in Sheffield, killing all 10 crew (seven later repatriated to the US)
- American volunteer derrickman Herman Douthit. While working Rig No. 148, Douthit was killed when he fell from a drilling mast. He was buried with full military honors and remains the only civilian burial at the cemetery

== The memorial (including chapel) ==
The memorial building is 85 ft (26 m) long, 30 ft (9.1 m) wide, and 28 ft (8.5 m) high; it is made of Portland stone; the doors of teak are embellished with relief models of World War II military equipment. The memorial comprises a large museum room and a small chapel. A great map on the wall shows schematically the air sorties flown from East Anglia, together with convoys across the North Atlantic and other actions in the war. The wall and roof have a mosaic of angels and ghostly aircraft. The south wall is inset with stained glass windows displaying the seals of the States of the Union arranged in ceremonial order.

The chapel was designed and built between 1952 and 1954 by the Boston-based architects Perry, Shaw, Hepburn, Kehoe and Dean. Hughes and Bicknell of Cambridge were the executant architects.

== Design ==
The architects of the site plan were Perry, Shaw, Hepburn and Dean; the landscape architecture was arranged by the Olmsted Brothers company.

== Chapel gallery ==
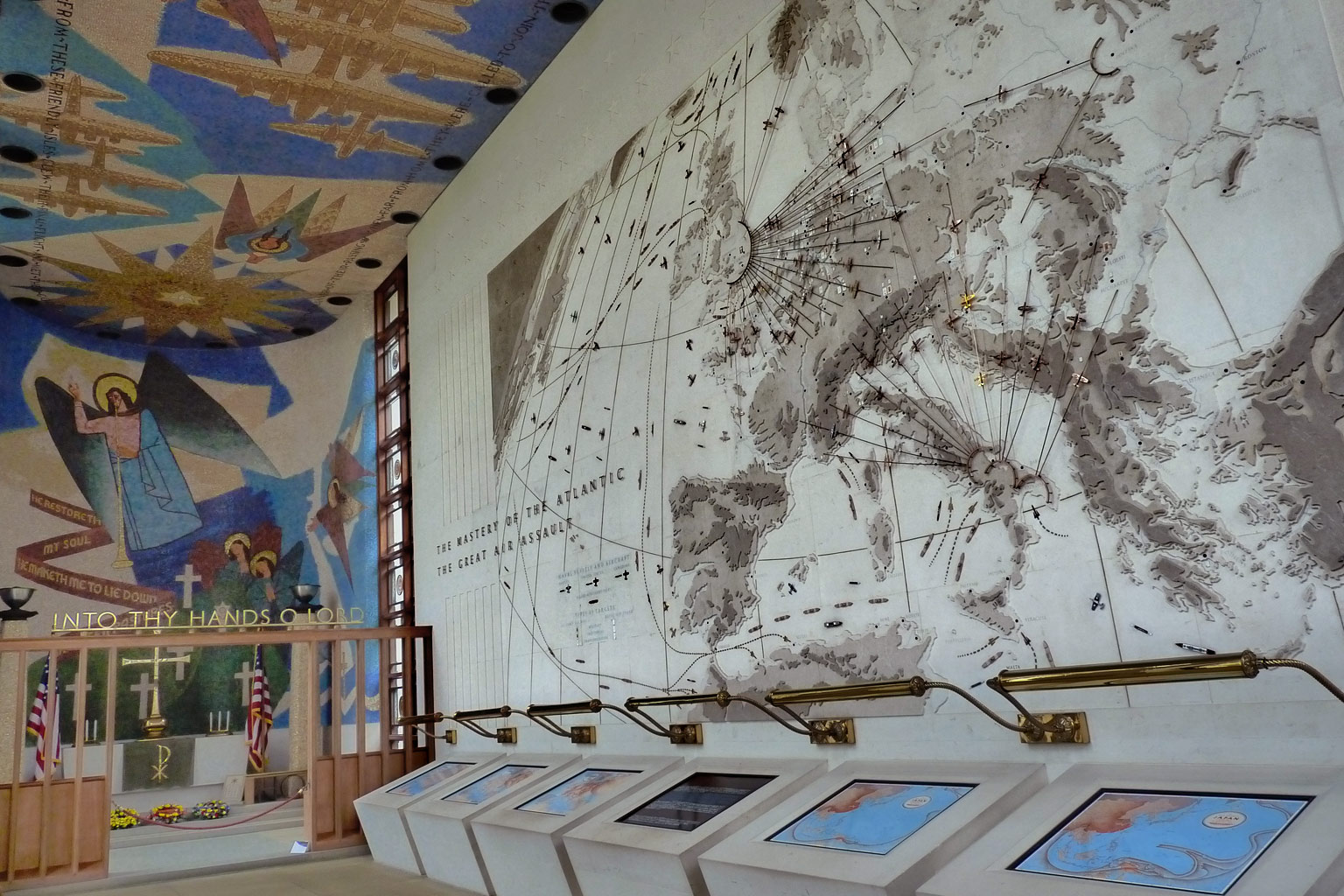
Chapel interior

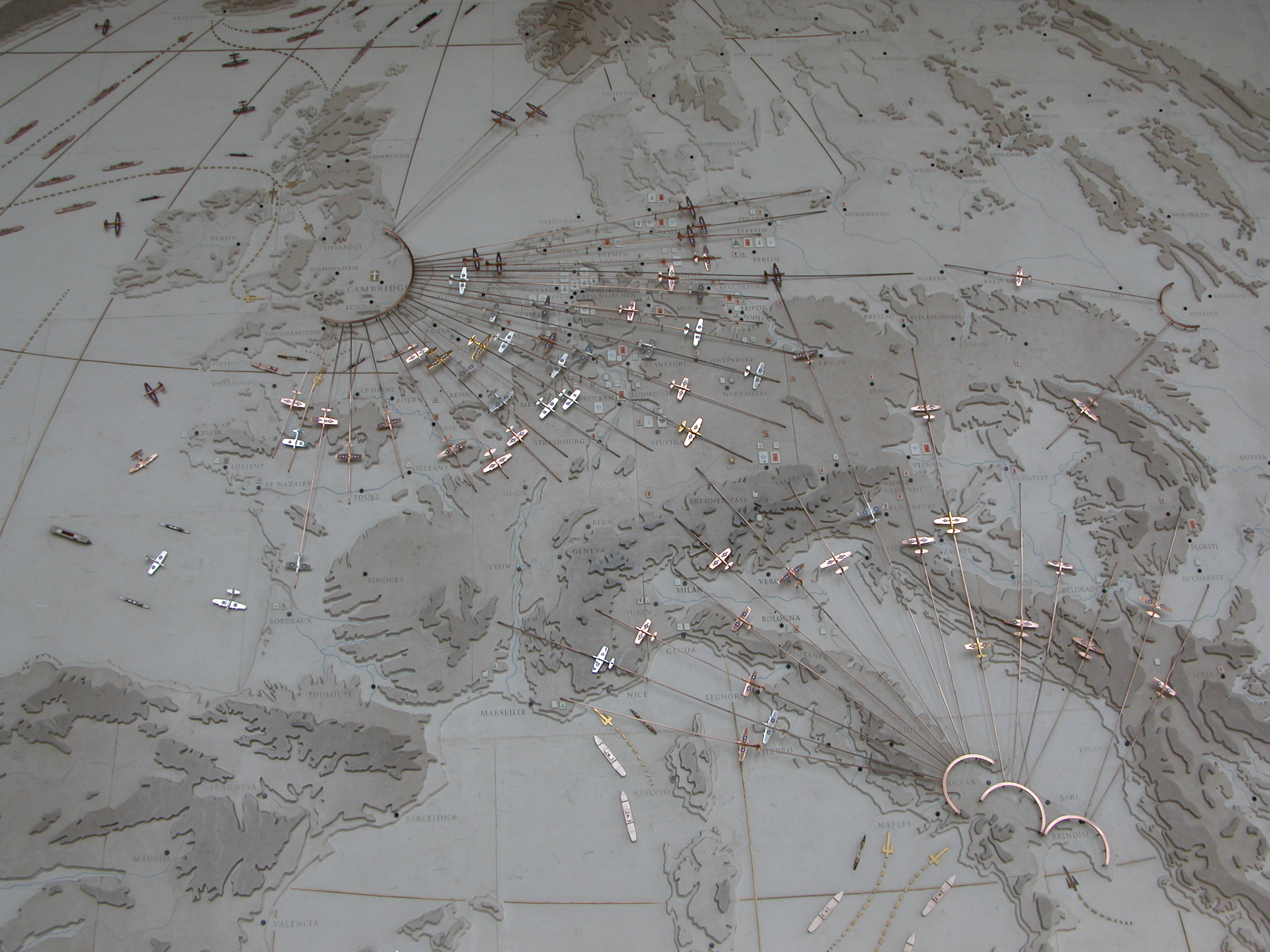
Showing the air sorties from East Anglia

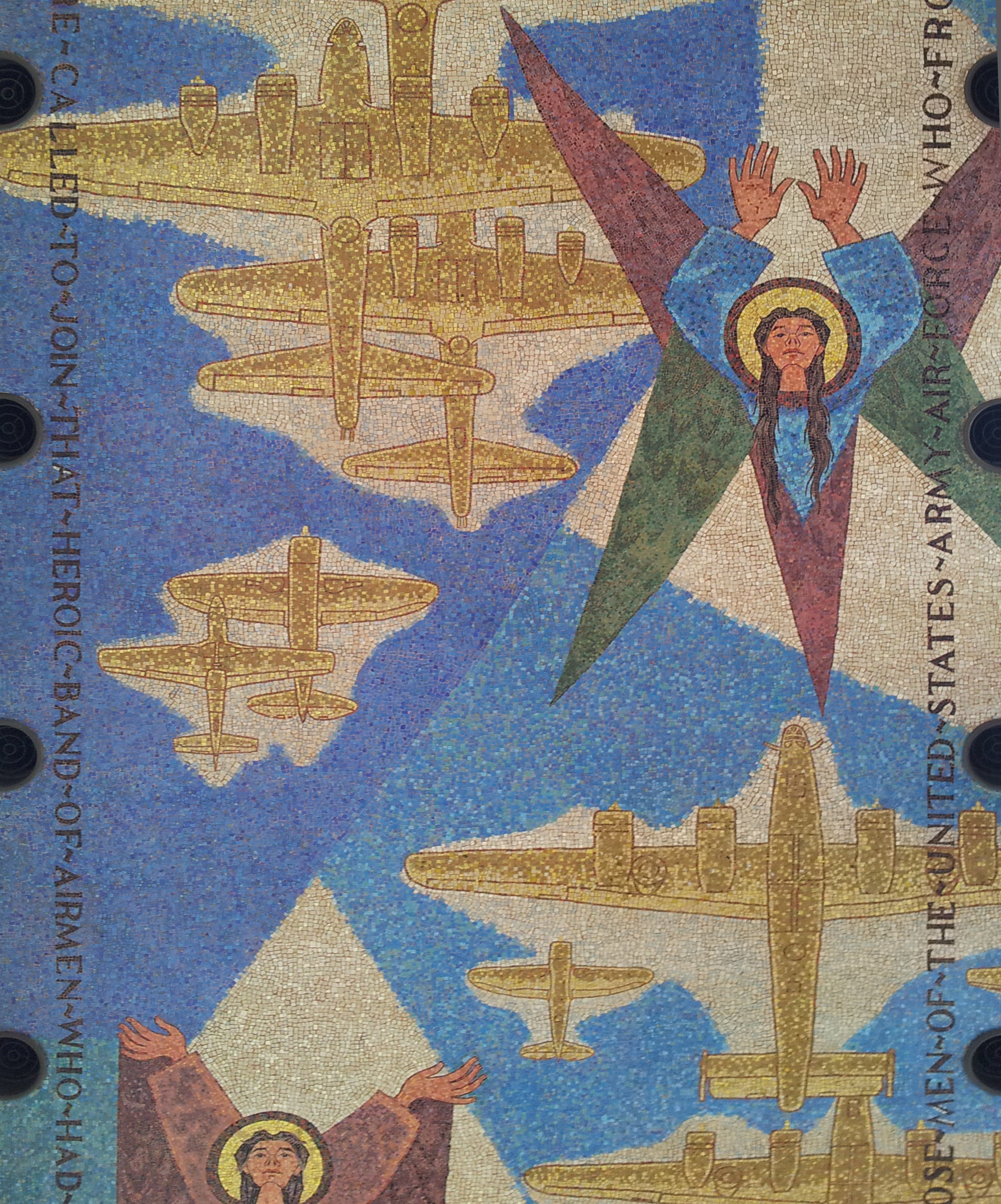
Design on the ceiling of the chapel

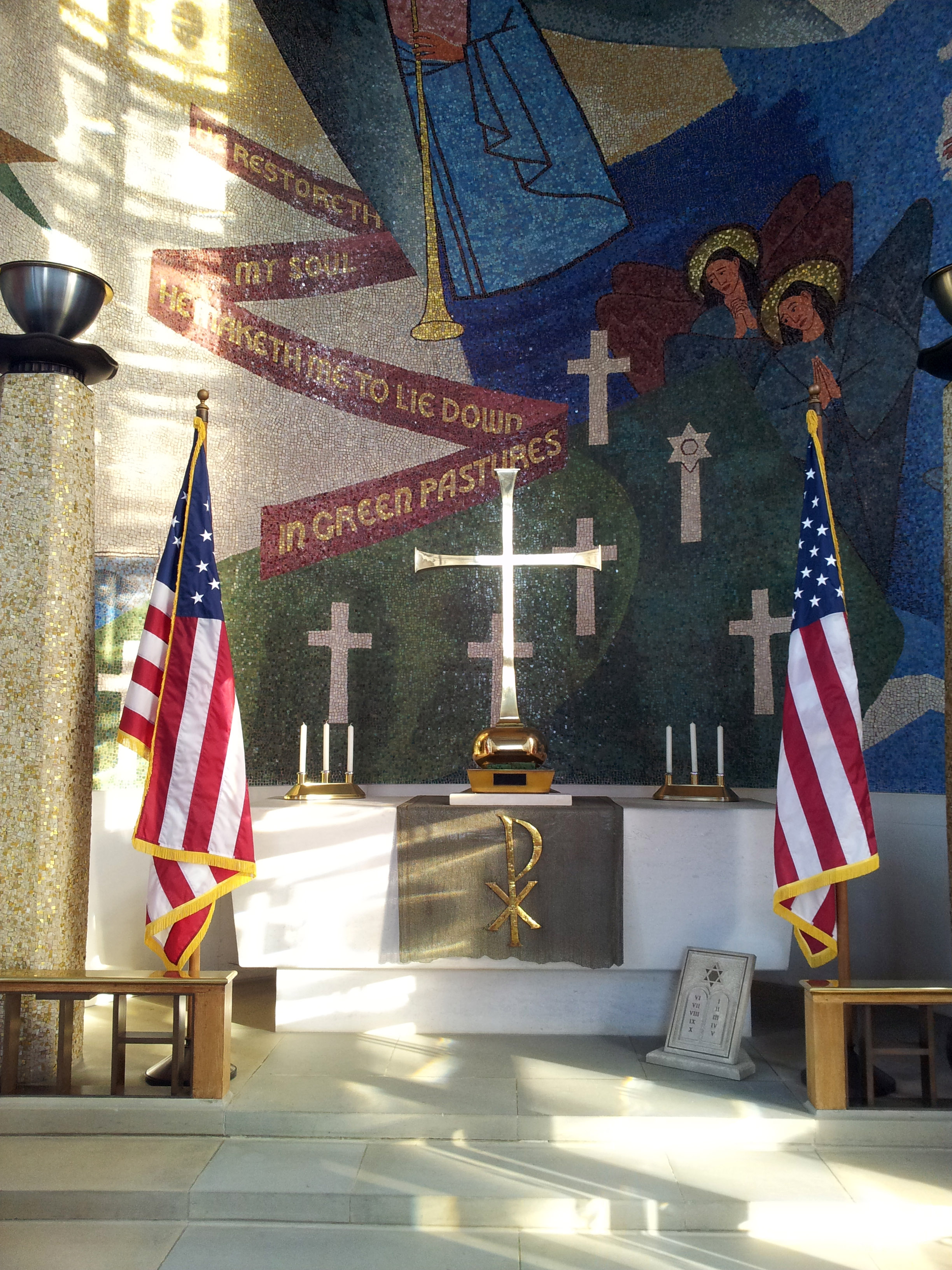
Altar in the chapel
