= John Joseph Seerley Jr. =

American flying ace

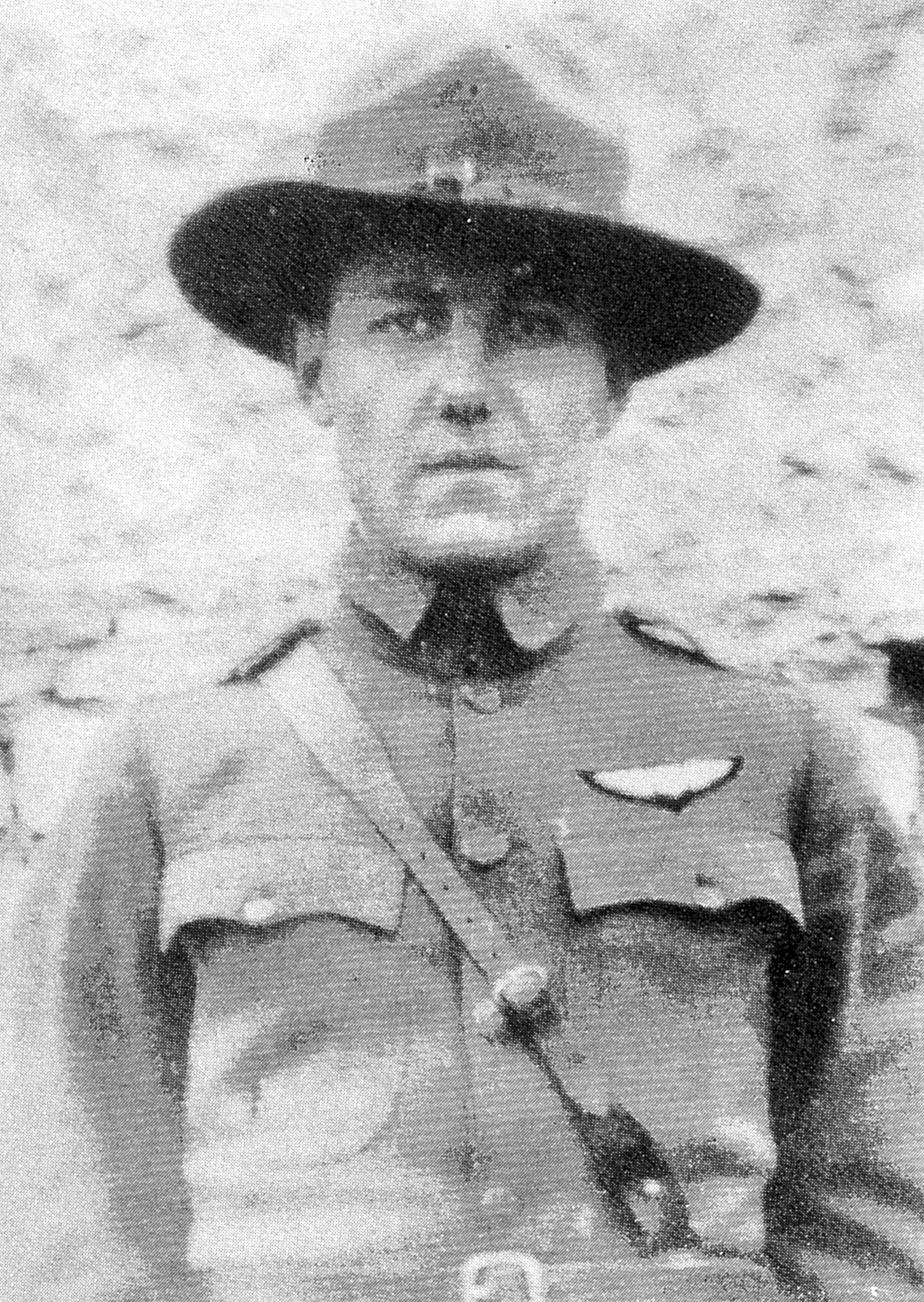
- Lieutenant John Joseph Seerley, 13th Aero Squadron, Souilly Aerodrome, France, 1918
- Born: November 21, 1897; Burlington, Iowa, US
- Died: August 21, 1943 (aged 45); Tetsworth, Oxfordshire, England
- Burial place: Cambridge American Cemetery and Memorial, Cambridge, England
- Military career
- Allegiance: United States
- Branch: United States Army
- Service years: 1917 – 1919; 1942 – 1943
- Rank: Major
- Units: 13th Aero Squadron; VIII Fighter Command
- Conflicts: World War I World War II
- Awards: Silver Star; Air Medal; Purple Heart
- Other work: Investment Banker, Lawyer.

John Joseph Seerley Jr. (21 November 1897 – 21 August 1943) was an American pursuit pilot and a flying ace in World War I. He re-joined the United States Army Air Forces in World War II. He was killed in a non-combat accident while serving in England as part of Eighth Air Force.

== Biography ==
Born in Burlington, Iowa, he was the son of United States Congressman John Joseph Seerley. He was a graduate of the University of Chicago, receiving a J.D. degree and a CPA. Seerley joined the Air Service, United States Army in 1917 during World War I. In combat over the Western Front in France, Lieutenant Seerley was credited with shares in five victories. with the 13th Aero Squadron.

After the war, Seerley started his own investment company in Chicago.

During World War II, he re-entered the military, joining the United States Army Air Forces, serving as an air intelligence officer. He was assigned as Assistant to the Deputy Chief of Staff, G-3, VIII Fighter Command and was deployed to England. Major Seerley was killed in a vehicle accident in Tetsworth, Oxfordshire, England. For his World War II service, Seerley was awarded the Air Medal and a Silver Star for conscientious service and gallantry in establishing the maximum fighter protection for American heavy bombers during air raids over Germany. He was buried at Cambridge American Cemetery and Memorial, Cambridge, England.
