= Madison Miner Walden =

American politician (1836–1891)

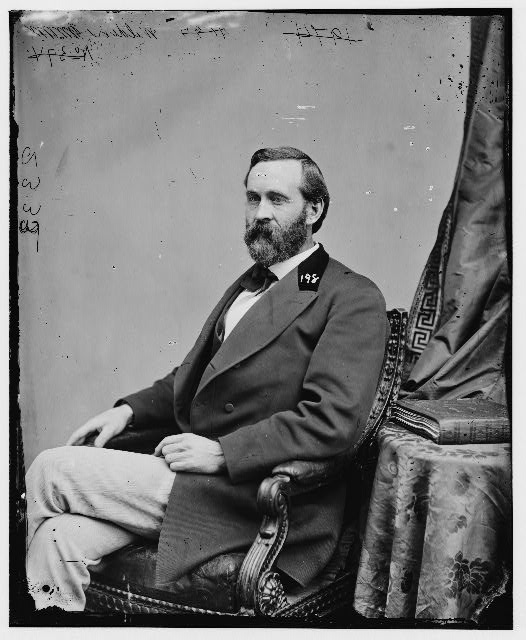

Member of the U.S. House of Representatives from Iowa's 4th district
- In office March 4, 1871 – March 3, 1873
- Preceded by: William Loughridge
- Succeeded by: Henry O. Pratt

7th Lieutenant Governor of Iowa
- In office January 9, 1870 – 1871
- Governor: Samuel Merrill
- Preceded by: John Scott
- Succeeded by: Henry C. Bulis

Member of the Iowa Senate
- In office January 13, 1868 – January 9, 1870

Member of the Iowa House of Representatives from Appanoose County
- In office January 8, 1866 – January 12, 1868
- In office January 13, 1890 – January 10, 1892

Personal details
- Born: October 6, 1836 Brush Creek Township, Scioto County, Ohio, U.S.
- Died: July 24, 1891 (aged 54) Washington, D.C., U.S.
- Resting place: Oakland Cemetery, Centerville, Iowa, U.S.
- Party: Republican
- Education: Ohio Wesleyan College

Military service
- Branch/service: Union Army
- Rank: Major
- Unit: 6th Iowa Infantry Regiment; 8th Iowa Cavalry Regiment
- Battles/wars: Civil War; Battle of Brown's Mill

Madison Miner Walden (October 6, 1836 – July 24, 1891) was a Civil War officer, teacher, publisher, farmer, the Lieutenant Governor of Iowa, and a one-term Republican U.S. Representative from Iowa's 4th congressional district, then located in southeastern Iowa.

== Biography ==
Born near Brush Creek Township, Scioto County, Ohio, Walden moved to Iowa in 1852. He attended Denmark Academy in Lee County, Iowa, and Iowa Wesleyan College in Mount Pleasant, Iowa, and graduated from Ohio Wesleyan College in Delaware, Ohio, in 1859. He settled in Centerville, Iowa (in Appanoose County).

After the outbreak of the Civil War, he served in the Union Army, as captain in the 6th Iowa Volunteer Infantry Regiment and the 8th Regiment Iowa Volunteer Cavalry, from May 1861 to May 1865. He was taken prisoner in an engagement at Newnan, Georgia, in July 1864, known as the Battle of Brown's Mill during "McCook's Raid." He later escaped from a prison camp at Charleston, South Carolina, and returned to his company. By the end of the War he had been promoted to the rank of major.

Returning from the War, he taught school, and published the Centerville (Iowa) Citizen from 1865 to 1874. He served as member of the Iowa House of Representatives in 1866 and 1867, and in the Iowa Senate, representing the 4th District, in 1868 and 1869. In 1869 he was elected as Lieutenant Governor of Iowa, starting his term in 1870.

In the 1870 Republican district convention for Iowa's 4th congressional district, Walden upset incumbent Fourth District Congressman William Loughridge in the race for the Party's nomination for Loughridge's seat. Walden won the general election, and served in the 42nd United States Congress from March 4, 1871 to March 3, 1873. However, when Walden ran for renomination in 1872 (in what was reapportioned in 1871 as Iowa's 6th congressional district), Loughridge turned the tables on Walden, ousting Walden.

After his defeat, Walden engaged in agricultural pursuits and coal mining in Centerville. In 1890 he was again a member of the Iowa House from Appanoose County. He returned to Washington, D.C. in 1889 when he was appointed chief clerk in the office of the Solicitor of the Treasury, and served until his death in Washington on July 24, 1891. He was interred in Oakland Cemetery in Centerville, Iowa.

Political offices
Preceded by John Scott	Lieutenant Governor of Iowa; 1870–1871	Succeeded by Henry C. Bulis
U.S. House of Representatives
Preceded by William Loughridge	U.S. House of Representatives, 4th Iowa District; 1871–1873	Succeeded by Henry O. Pratt
