= William Loughridge =

American politician

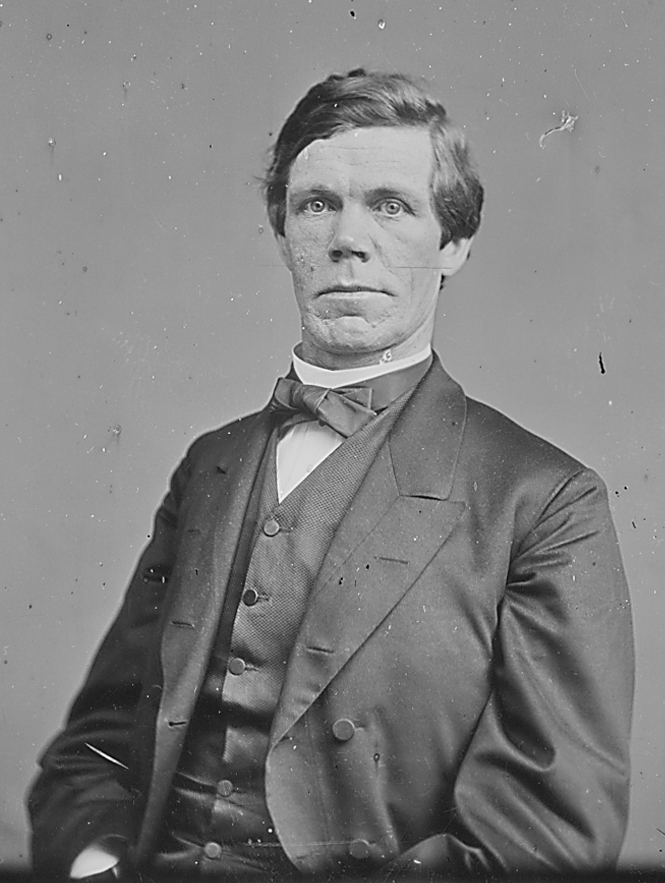

Member of the U.S. House of Representatives from Iowa's 6th district
- In office March 4, 1873 – March 3, 1875
- Preceded by: Jackson Orr
- Succeeded by: Ezekiel S. Sampson

Member of the U.S. House of Representatives from Iowa's 4th district
- In office March 4, 1867 – March 3, 1871
- Preceded by: Josiah B. Grinnell
- Succeeded by: Madison M. Walden

Personal details
- Born: July 11, 1827 Youngstown, Ohio, U.S.
- Died: September 26, 1889 (aged 62) Reading, Pennsylvania, U.S
- Party: Republican

William Loughridge (July 11, 1827 – September 26, 1889) was a pioneer attorney, judge, and three-term United States Congressman from Iowa.

He was born in Youngstown, Ohio, where he attended the common schools. After studying law, he was admitted to the bar in 1849 and commenced practice in Mansfield, Ohio. He moved to Iowa in 1852 and settled in Oskaloosa, in Mahaska County.

He served as a member of the Iowa Senate from 1857 to 1860. In 1861 he became a judge of the sixth judicial circuit of Iowa, serving until 1867.

In the 1866 Republican district convention for Iowa's 4th congressional district, Loughridge upset incumbent Congressman Josiah B. Grinnell, winning (by thirteen votes) the nomination for the U.S. House of Representatives seat then held by Grinnell. After winning the general election and serving in the Fortieth United States Congress, Loughridge was re-elected in 1868 and served in the Forty-first United States Congress. In this term, he was one of four House Republicans to oppose the final version of the Fifteenth Amendment to the United States Constitution, and the only one of the four to have supported its initial version. In the 1870 Republican district convention, Loughridge was upset by Madison Miner Walden. Walden won the general election. However, when Walden ran for renomination in 1872 (in what was reapportioned in 1871 as Iowa's 6th congressional district), Loughridge turned the tables on Walden, ousting Walden.

Loughridge served only one term representing the new Sixth District. He sought renomination, but in the 1874 district convention ballotting, he finished behind his eventual successor, Ezekiel S. Sampson, and Sampson's successor, James B. Weaver (who had not yet left the Republican Party for the Greenback Party). In all, Loughridge served in Congress from March 4, 1867, to March 3, 1871, and from March 4, 1873, to March 3, 1875.

He died near Reading, Pennsylvania, and is buried in Forest Cemetery in Oskaloosa.

U.S. House of Representatives
Preceded by Josiah Bushnell Grinnell	U.S. House of Representatives, 4th Iowa District; 1867–1871	Succeeded by Madison Miner Walden
Preceded by Jackson Orr	U.S. House of Representatives, 6th Iowa District; 1873–1875	Succeeded by Ezekiel Silas Sampson
