= John H. Gear =

American politician (1825–1900)

John Henry Gear
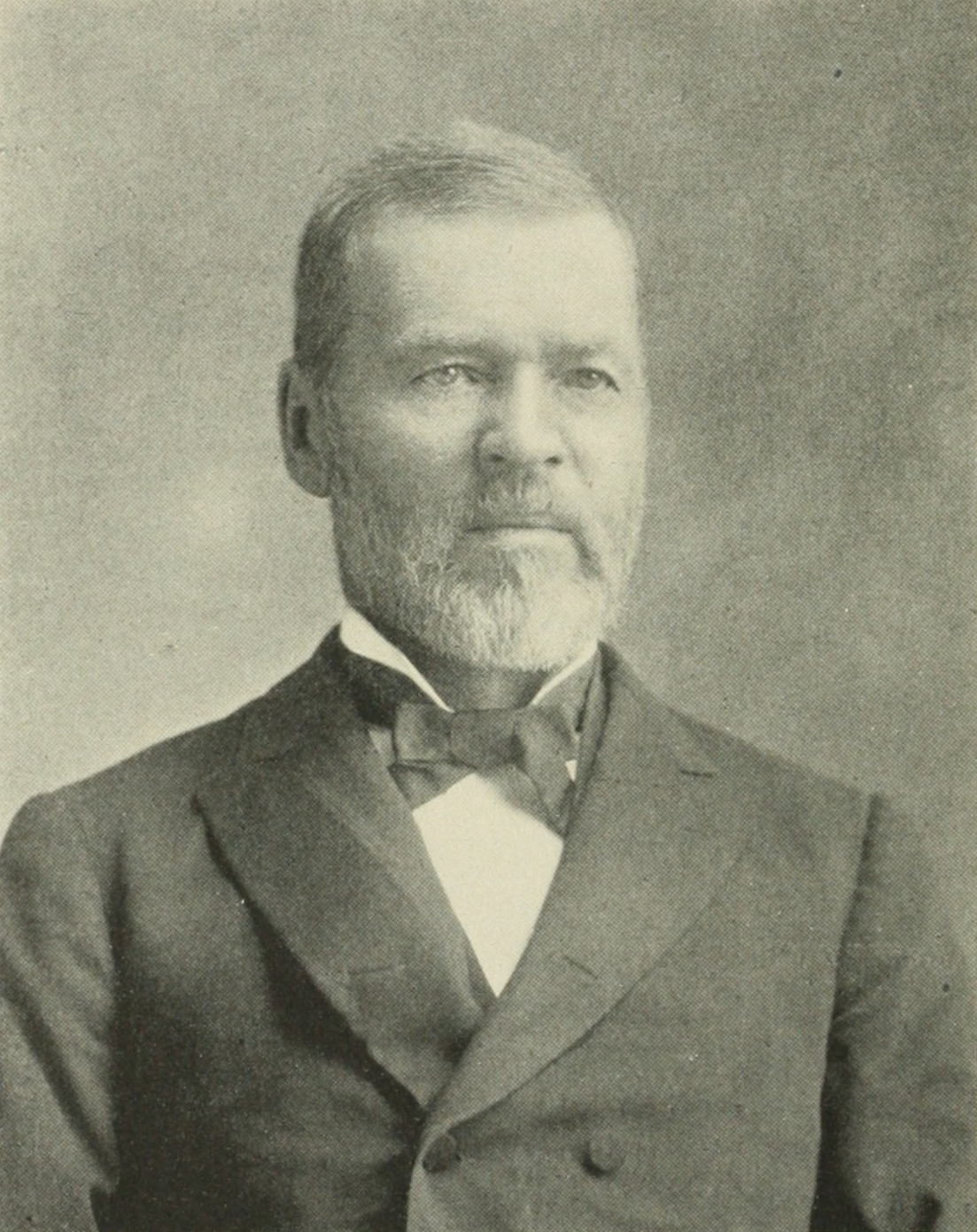

United States Senator from Iowa
- In office March 4, 1895 – July 14, 1900
- Preceded by: James F. Wilson
- Succeeded by: Jonathan P. Dolliver

Assistant Secretary of Treasury
- In office 1892–1893
- Appointed by: Benjamin Harrison

Member of the U.S. House of Representatives from Iowa's 1st district
- In office March 4, 1887 – March 3, 1891
- Preceded by: Benton J. Hall
- Succeeded by: John J. Seerley
- In office March 4, 1893 – March 3, 1895
- Preceded by: John J. Seerley
- Succeeded by: Samuel M. Clark

11th Governor of Iowa
- In office January 17, 1878 – January 12, 1882
- Lieutenant: Frank T. Campbell
- Preceded by: Joshua G. Newbold
- Succeeded by: Buren R. Sherman

Speaker of the Iowa House of Representatives
- In office 1874–1878

Member of the Iowa House of Representatives from the 2nd district
- In office January 8, 1872 – January 13, 1878

Mayor of Burlington, Iowa
- In office 1863–1867

Personal details
- Born: April 7, 1825 Ithaca, New York, U.S.
- Died: July 14, 1900 (aged 75) Washington, D.C., U.S.
- Resting place: Aspen Grove Cemetery; Burlington, Iowa, U.S.
- Party: Republican
- Spouse: Harriet Foot (m.1852)
- Children: 4

John Henry Gear (April 7, 1825 – July 14, 1900) served as the 11th governor of Iowa, a United States representative and a member of the United States Senate.

== Early life ==
Born in Ithaca, New York, to Protestant minister E. G. Gear, he attended the common schools and moved to Galena, Illinois, in 1836, to Fort Snelling, Minnesota, in 1838, and to Burlington, Iowa in 1843, where he engaged in mercantile pursuits.

== Political career ==
=== Mayor and Iowa House ===
He was elected mayor of Burlington in 1863 and as a member of the Iowa House of Representatives from 1871 to 1877, serving as Speaker for two terms.

=== Governor ===
He ran for governor of Iowa in 1876 and won, receiving 121,546 votes, against 79,353 for John P. Irish, 10,639 for Elias Jessup and 38,228 for D. P. Stubbs. His plurality over Irish was 42,193. He was inaugurated January 17, 1878. He was re-elected in 1879 by a vote of: Gear, 157,571; Trimble, 85,056; Campbell, 45,439; Dungan, 3,258, Gear's majority over all competitors, 23,828. His second inauguration took place in January 1880. During his tenure, he aimed to reduce the large state deficit, left by previous administrations and he secured legislation that dissolved the state's Civil War debt.

=== US House and Senate and Federal Appointment ===
He was elected as a Republican to represent Iowa's 1st congressional district in the U.S. House for the Fiftieth and Fifty-first Congresses, serving from March 4, 1887, to March 3, 1891. He was an unsuccessful candidate for reelection in 1890, but was appointed by President Benjamin Harrison as Assistant Secretary of the Treasury, serving from 1892 to 1893. He returned to the U.S. House for one final term, winning the 1892 1st district election, then serving in the Fifty-third Congress, from March 4, 1893, to March 3, 1895.

In 1894, Gear was elected by the Iowa General Assembly to the United States Senate. He was reelected in 1900. He served from March 4, 1895, until his death on July 14, 1900, before the start of his second term. He had been chairman of the United States Senate Committee on Pacific Railroads in the Fifty-fourth through Fifty-Sixth Congresses.

== Personal life ==
He married Harriet Foot, who hailed from Vermont, in 1852 and had 4 children with her.

He died, aged 75, in Washington, D.C., and his interment was in Aspen Grove Cemetery in Burlington.

== See also ==
- List of members of the United States Congress who died in office (1900–1949)

Party political offices
Preceded by Samuel J. Kirkwood	Republican nominee Governor of Iowa; 1877, 1879	Succeeded by Buren R. Sherman
Political offices
Preceded by Joshua G. Newbold	Governor of Iowa; 1878–1882	Succeeded by Buren R. Sherman
U.S. House of Representatives
Preceded by Benton J. Hall	Member of the U.S. House of Representatives from Iowa's 1st congressional district March 4, 1887 – March 3, 1891	Succeeded by John J. Seerley
Preceded by John J. Seerley	Member of the U.S. House of Representatives from Iowa's 1st congressional district March 4, 1893 – March 3, 1895	Succeeded by Samuel M. Clark
U.S. Senate
Preceded by James F. Wilson	U.S. senator (Class 2) from Iowa; 1895–1900; Served alongside: William B. Allison	Succeeded by Jonathan P. Dolliver
