= La Vega G. Kinne =

American judge (1846–1906)

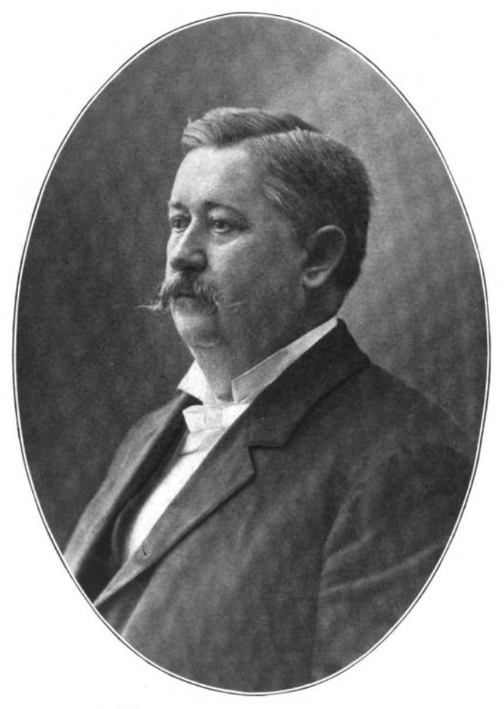

Justice of the Iowa Supreme Court
- In office January 1, 1892 – December 31, 1897
- Constituency: Tama County

Personal details
- Born: November 5, 1846; Syracuse, New York
- Died: March 15, 1906 (aged 59); Des Moines, Iowa
- Political party: Democratic
- Spouse: Mary E. Abrams (m. 1869)
- Children: 2
- Education: University of Michigan
- Occupation: Jurist, politician

La Vega G. Kinne (November 5, 1846 – March 15, 1906) was a justice of the Iowa Supreme Court from January 1, 1892, to December 31, 1897, appointed from Tama County.

== Biography ==
La Vega G. Kinne was born in Syracuse, New York on November 5, 1846. He earned a law degree at the University of Michigan in 1868, and was admitted to the bar in Ottawa, Illinois. He moved to Toledo, Iowa in 1869 to practice law.

He married Mary E. Abrams in 1869 and they had two daughters.

A Democrat, he unsuccessfully ran for governor in 1881 and 1883. He was elected as district court judge in 1886, reelected in 1890, and then elected to the Iowa Supreme Court in 1891, serving from 1892 to 1897.

He died from heart failure in Des Moines on March 15, 1906.
