= Joshua G. Newbold =

Union Army officer and politician (1830–1903)

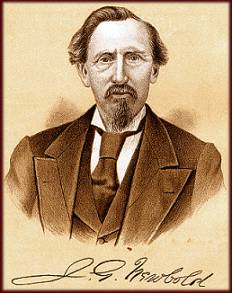

Mayor of Mount Pleasant, Iowa
- In office 1899–1903

10th Governor of Iowa
- In office February 1, 1877 – January 17, 1878
- Lieutenant: Henry Rothert (acting)
- Preceded by: Samuel J. Kirkwood
- Succeeded by: John H. Gear

10th Lieutenant Governor of Iowa
- In office January 13, 1876 – February 1, 1877
- Governor: Samuel J. Kirkwood
- Preceded by: Joseph Dysart
- Succeeded by: Frank T. Campbell

Member of the Iowa House of Representatives
- In office 1872–1876

Personal details
- Born: May 12, 1830 Fayette County, Pennsylvania, U.S.
- Died: June 10, 1903 (aged 73) Mount Pleasant, Iowa, U.S.
- Party: Republican
- Spouse: Rachel Farquhar (m.1850)
- Children: 5

Military service
- Allegiance: United States
- Branch/service: Union Army
- Years of service: 1862-1864
- Rank: Captain
- Unit: 25th Iowa Infantry Regiment, Company C
- Battles/wars: Battle of Chickasaw Bayou; Battle of Fort Hindman; Third Battle of Chattanooga; Battle of Ringgold Gap; Atlanta campaign; Sherman's March to the Sea.

Joshua Gaskill Newbold (May 12, 1830 – June 10, 1903) was the tenth governor of Iowa.

== Early life ==
Newbold was born in 1830 to Barzilla and Catherine Houseman Newbold in Fayette County, Pennsylvania. Newbold grew up in a Quaker family in Pennsylvania. Later he became a Baptist, specifically Free Will Baptist. He moved to Mount Pleasant, Iowa in March 1854, where he was a farmer.

== Civil war service ==
He joined the Union Army in 1862 as captain of Company C, 25th Iowa Infantry Regiment, and fought at the Battle of Chickasaw Bayou, the Battle of Fort Hindman, the Third Battle of Chattanooga, the Battle of Ringgold Gap, the Atlanta campaign, and Sherman's March to the Sea. Towards the end of his service, he served as a Judge's Advocate in Woodville, Alabama. He served three years before discharging due to a disability.

== Postbellum ==
Newbold served in the Iowa House of Representatives from 1872 to 1876. He was elected Lieutenant Governor as a Republican in 1876, and succeeded to the governorship when Samuel J. Kirkwood resigned to take a seat in the United States Senate. During his tenure, he worked to reduce the state's deficit problem and improve the tax system. He left office in January 1878.

== Personal life ==
On May 2, 1850, he married Rachel Farquhar in Fayette County, Pennsylvania. They had five children.

From 1899 to 1903, Newbold was mayor of Mount Pleasant, Iowa, where he died and was buried in the Forest Home cemetery in 1903.

Political offices
| Preceded by Joseph Dysart | Lieutenant Governor of Iowa; 1876–1877 | Succeeded by Frank T. Campbell |
| Preceded by Samuel J. Kirkwood | Governor of Iowa; 1877–1878 | Succeeded by John H. Gear |
