= Same-sex marriage in Iowa =

Same-sex marriage has been legally recognized in Iowa since a decision of the Iowa Supreme Court on April 3, 2009. Marriage licenses became available to same-sex couples on April 27. This ruling was the result of a lawsuit filed in 2005 by six same-sex couples who had been denied marriage licenses in Polk County. In 2007, the Polk County District Court ruled in favor of the couples in Varnum v. Brien. Two couples were married on September 2, 2007, before the ruling was stayed and appealed. On April 3, 2009, the Iowa Supreme Court unanimously upheld the lower court's ruling, making Iowa the third U.S. state to legalize same-sex marriage. (Note: After Massachusetts and Connecticut, but excluding California which had constitutionally banned same-sex marriage in November 2008, but still recognized marriages performed between June and November 2008.) Subsequent attempts to ban same-sex marriages in the Constitution of Iowa were unsuccessful.

Polling suggests that a majority of Iowans support the legal recognition of same-sex marriage, with a 2023 Public Religion Research Institute poll showing that 75% of respondents supported same-sex marriage.

== Legal restrictions ==
In 1998, following court decisions on same-sex unions in other states, notably Baehr v. Miike in Hawaii, that suggested that denying the right to marry to same-sex couples was incompatible with the Equal Protection Clause of a state constitution like Iowa's, state legislators who hoped to avoid a similar court challenge tried without success to pass a statute to prohibit same-sex marriages.

In February 2025, 33 Democratic lawmakers introduced legislation to replace all references to "a man and a woman" in marriage statutes with the gender-neutral phrasing "two eligible parties", thus officially incorporating the Varnum decision into statutory law. The measure failed to pass the Republican-controlled General Assembly.

== Lawsuit ==
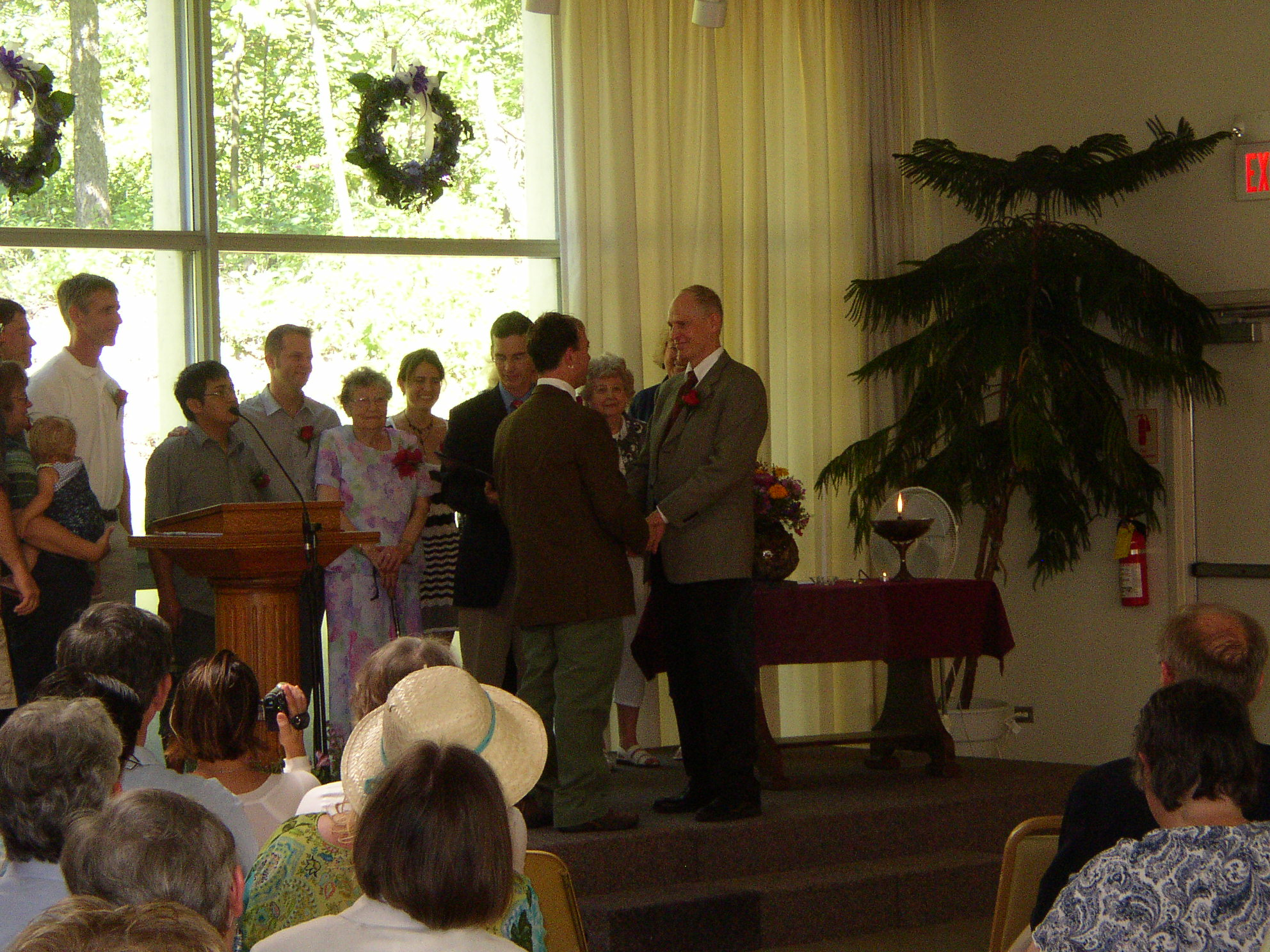
Terry Lowman and Mark Kassis exchanging wedding vows at the Unitarian Universalist Fellowship in Ames on Sunday, September 2, 2007

=== Proceedings and ruling in Varnum ===
Six same-sex couples in Polk County represented by Lambda Legal sought the right to marry their same-sex partners in Iowa. They brought suit in 2005 arguing that denying them marriage licenses violated the liberty and equal protection clauses of the State Constitution. Judge Robert Hanson of Polk County District Court ruled in favor of the plaintiffs on August 30, 2007. The next morning, Hanson stayed his decision pending an appeal to the Iowa Supreme Court. Within two hours after the district court published its ruling, two men from Des Moines submitted an application for marriage to the county recorder and their application was accepted. The next morning, several other couples applied for marriage licenses before Hanson issued his stay. Iowa marriage law requires a three-day waiting period between the initial application for a marriage license and the time the marriage becomes official, unless this waiting period is waived by a judge. Sean Fritz and Tim McQuillan, residents of Ames and students at Iowa State University, were the only couple to receive such a waiver before Hanson issued his stay. After receiving the waiver and applying for a marriage license on the morning of August 31, the couple was married in a short ceremony that morning by a Unitarian Universalist minister on the minister's front lawn in Des Moines. Evan Wolfson of Freedom to Marry stated on the 2007 decision:

That's a win. It's not a final win, because the case is being appealed. But just a few years ago if people were asked if we could get a judge in Iowa to strike down the exclusion from marriage, right there in the heartland, I think most people would have said we couldn't.

Two other Ames residents who applied for a marriage license before the stay, Terry Lowman and Mark Kassis, were married on September 2 in a ceremony at the Unitarian Universalist Fellowship of Ames. Lowman and Kassis' three-day waiting period was waived by a judge; however, Hanson's stay occurred before the couple was able to record the marriage license. However, it is legal opinion that the marriage is legal in Iowa. Upon appeal, a unanimous Iowa Supreme Court affirmed Hanson's ruling in Varnum v. Brien on April 3, 2009. Using the standard known as intermediate scrutiny to evaluate the state's justifications for denying marriage licenses to same-sex couples, the court determined that denying marriage licenses on the basis of sexual orientation violated the equal protection clause of the Iowa Constitution. Licenses were originally to be available 21 days after the ruling on April 24, but the availability of licenses was postponed until April 27 due to a furlough day. The court wrote:

Iowa Code section 595.2 is unconstitutional because the County has been unable to identify a constitutionally adequate justification for excluding plaintiffs from the institution of civil marriage. A new distinction based on sexual orientation would be equally suspect and difficult to square with the fundamental principles of equal protection embodied in our constitution. This record, our independent research, and the appropriate equal protection analysis do not suggest the existence of a justification for such a legislative classification that substantially furthers any governmental objective. Consequently, the language in Iowa Code section 595.2 limiting civil marriage to a man and a woman must be stricken from the statute, and the remaining statutory language must be interpreted and applied in a manner allowing gay and lesbian people full access to the institution of civil marriage.

Despite the ruling in Varnum, the Iowa Department of Public Health had refused to recognize same-sex marriages when completing birth and death certificates. On December 12, 2012, ruling in Buntemeyer v. Iowa Department of Public Health, a state court ordered the department to list the names of two women, a married lesbian couple, on the death certificate of their stillborn son. The Iowa Supreme Court heard arguments that same day in the department's appeal of a decision in Gartner v. Newton that had ordered it to enter the names of two women as parents on a birth certificate. On May 3, 2013, the court unanimously affirmed the lower court's ruling in Gartner and said that "by naming the nonbirthing spouse on the birth certificate of a married lesbian couple's child, the child is ensured support from that parent and the parent establishes fundamental legal rights at the moment of birth".

=== Reactions and subsequent changes ===
==== Judicial retention elections ====
Same-sex marriage in the United States

On November 2, 2010, Iowa Supreme Court justices David Baker, Michael Streit and Marsha Ternus, who participated in the unanimous 2009 ruling that Iowa could not deny marriage licenses based on sexual orientation, were removed from office after judicial retention elections. Their removal followed campaigning by groups opposed to same-sex marriage, including the National Organization for Marriage. The three judges did no campaigning on their own behalf, but were supported by numerous third parties. On November 6, 2012, Justice David Wiggins won retention in an election, largely due to the fact that Iowa had reversed its opposition to same-sex marriage, now showing majority support.

In June 2015, Streit and Baker expressed support for Obergefell v. Hodges, the U.S. Supreme Court ruling that legalized same-sex marriage nationwide in the United States. Baker said, "I think it just shows that we were a little bit ahead of our time in anticipating this result." Streit added, "I think all seven of us are very proud of what we did. Has marriage been lessened because of what we did? No, and in the U.S. all people will be able to enjoy the freedoms of America and be treated as equal citizens under our law." Reacting to the Obergefell ruling, Kate Varnum, plaintiff in Varnum, said, "To think how far we've come in the past 10 years since we filed the lawsuit in Iowa - it's incredible." Governor Terry Branstad said he was "disappointed" and called for the passage of a constitutional amendment banning same-sex marriage, but acknowledged that such an amendment has "virtually no chance of [succeeding]".

==== Attempts to pass constitutional ban ====
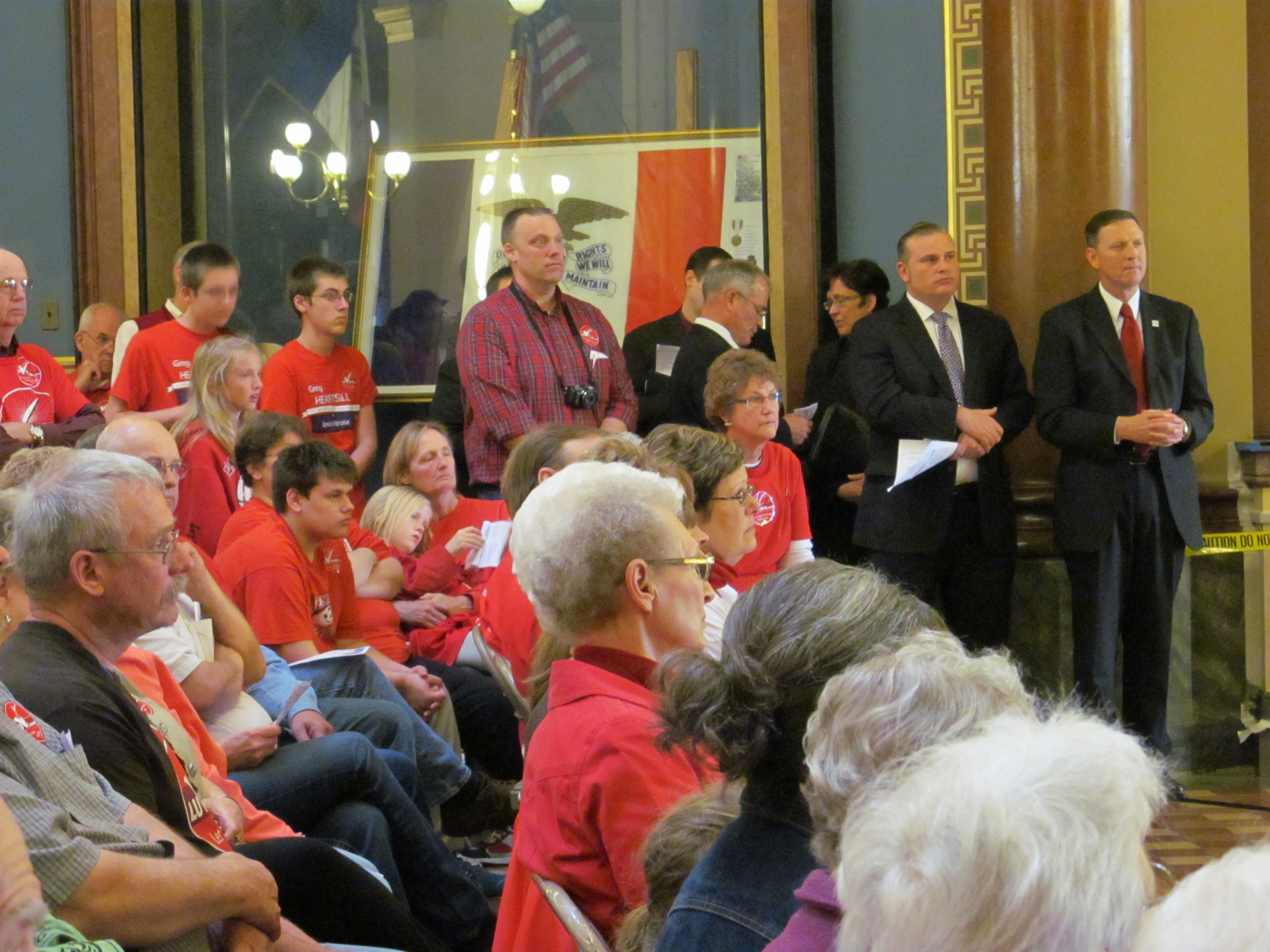
Opponents of same-sex marriage holding a rally and a press conference at the Iowa State Capitol, March 2011

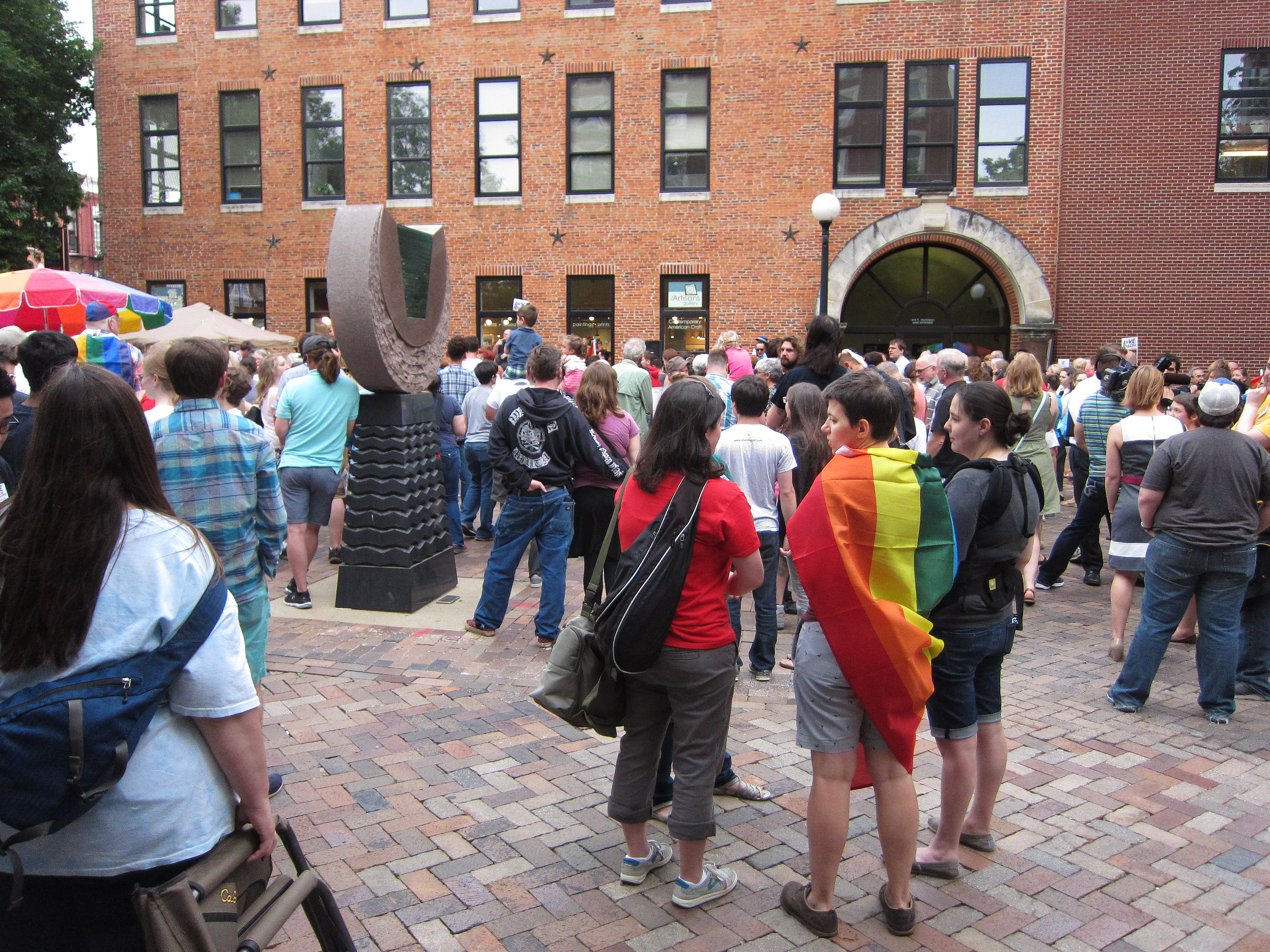
Rally supporting the U.S. Supreme Court's decision in Obergefell in Iowa City, June 26, 2015

State constitutional amendments to ban same-sex marriage were proposed several times in the General Assembly in the wake of the judicial rulings. To amend the Constitution of Iowa, two consecutive sessions of the Assembly would need to approve the amendment, after which it would be placed on the ballot for final approval by the Iowa electorate.

An amendment was first proposed in 2008 but did not pass. The Assembly did not vote on a constitutional amendment in 2009, and Senate Majority Leader Michael Gronstal said he would not allow one to be brought to the floor in 2010. In a joint press release with House Speaker Pat Murphy on April 3, 2009, Gronstal welcomed the court's decision, saying, "When all is said and done, we believe the only lasting question about today's events will be why it took us so long. It is a tough question to answer because treating everyone fairly is really a matter of Iowa common sense and Iowa common decency. Iowa has always been a leader in the area of civil rights." Democratic leaders of the Iowa Senate and House of Representatives during the 2009–2010 legislative session opposed a vote on an amendment. In the next session, debate on a proposed constitutional amendment to ban same-sex marriage in Iowa attracted national news coverage after Zach Wahls, a college student and son of a lesbian couple, addressed the House Judiciary Committee in a public hearing on January 31, 2011. A video of his testimony posted on YouTube went viral. On February 1, 2011, with Republicans in the majority, the House passed House Joint Resolution 6 by a vote of 62–37. Democratic leaders promised to block debate in the Senate, which they did. Same-sex marriage could also have been banned by constitutional convention, which Iowa voters can initiate once a decade. On November 2, 2010, voters defeated a proposed constitutional convention by a 2–1 margin.

In 2023, eight Republican lawmakers introduced two bills to the General Assembly; (Note: The lawmakers were Brad Sherman, Luana Stoltenberg, Mark Cisneros, Helena Hayes, Zach Dieken, Skyler Wheeler, Phil Thompson, and Thomas Gerhold.) the first to add a same-sex marriage ban to the Iowa Constitution and the second to declare the Respect for Marriage Act, signed into law by President Joe Biden in December 2022, inoperable in Iowa. The bills, which political experts and advocates widely considered unconstitutional, were not moved out of committee and died in March 2023. In May 2025, Senator Sandy Salmon introduced an unsuccessful resolution to the General Assembly urging the U.S. Supreme Court to overturn Obergefell. The measure was likely to encounter significant civil opposition if passed, as the majority of Iowa residents support the legal recognition of same-sex marriage according to polling.

== Native American nations ==
The Indian Civil Rights Act primarily aims to protect the rights of Native Americans but also reinforces the principle of tribal self-governance. While it does not grant sovereignty, the Act affirms the authority of tribes to govern their own legal affairs. Consequently, many tribes have enacted their own marriage and family laws. As a result, the Supreme Court's Obergefell ruling did not automatically apply to tribal jurisdictions. The Sac and Fox Tribe of the Mississippi in Iowa bans same-sex marriages. Its Tribal Code states that "only persons of the opposite gender may marry" on the reservation. However, the Code also states "all marriages performed other than as provided for in this Code, which are valid under the laws of the jurisdiction where and when performed, are valid within the jurisdiction of the Sac & Fox of the Mississippi in Iowa."

Native Americans have deep-rooted marriage traditions, placing a strong emphasis on community, family and spiritual connections. While there are no records of same-sex marriages being performed in Native American cultures in the way they are commonly defined in Western legal systems, many Indigenous communities recognize identities and relationships that may be placed on the LGBT spectrum. Among these are two-spirit individuals—people who embody both masculine and feminine qualities. In some cultures, two-spirit individuals assigned male at birth wear women's clothing and engage in household and artistic work associated with the feminine sphere. Historically, this identity sometimes allowed for unions between two people of the same biological sex. Sauk two-spirit individuals, known as nîshwi manetôwaki, characterize their gender role change as "an unfortunate destiny which they cannot avoid, being supposed to be impelled to this course by a vision from the female spirit that resides in the Moon." Traditionally, they were sacred and honored annually with a dance in which only those men who had had sexual intercourse with a nîshwi manetôwaki were allowed to participate.

== Economic impact ==
A 2008 study from the University of California, Los Angeles analyzed the impact of allowing same-sex couples to marry on Iowa's state budget. The study concluded that allowing same-sex couples to marry would result in a net gain of approximately $5.3 million each year for the state. This net impact would be the result of savings in expenditures on state means-tested public benefit programs and an increase in state income and sales tax revenue.

== Marriage statistics ==
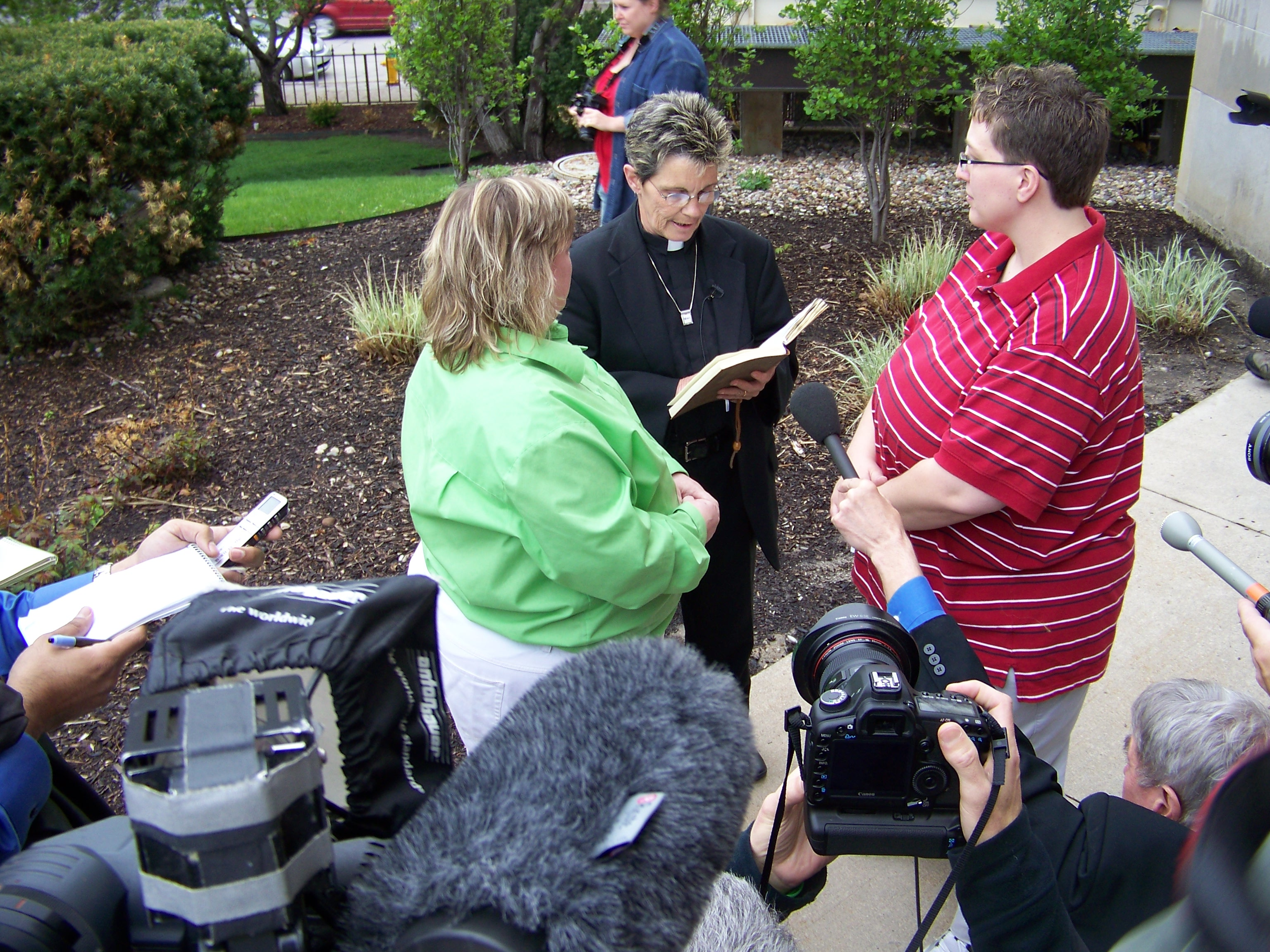
Melisa Keeton and Shelley Wolfe marrying in Des Moines on April 27, 2009 following the Iowa Supreme Court's ruling in Varnum

Between April 2009 and March 2010, 2,020 same-sex couples were married in Iowa, accounting for 10.1% of all marriages conducted in the state during that period. Only 815 couples were from Iowa, with the rest being from out of state, predominantly from neighboring Illinois, Missouri and Nebraska.

By June 26, 2015, the day the U.S. Supreme Court legalized same-sex marriage nationwide in Obergefell v. Hodges, approximately 11,000 same-sex couples had married in Iowa, mostly in Polk, Scott, Johnson, Pottawattamie and Linn counties. The 2020 U.S. census showed that there were 4,349 married same-sex couple households (1,681 male couples and 2,668 female couples) and 3,274 unmarried same-sex couple households in Iowa.

Number of marriages performed in Iowa
| Year | Same-sex marriages | | | Opposite-sex marriages | Total marriages | % same-sex |
| Year | Female | Male | Total | Opposite-sex marriages | Total marriages | % same-sex |
|---|---|---|---|---|---|---|
| 2009 | 1,138 | 645 | 1,783 | 19,356 | 21,139 | 8.43% |
| 2010 | 1,082 | 512 | 1,594 | 19,286 | 20,880 | 7.63% |
| 2011 | 885 | 417 | 1,302 | 19,265 | 20,567 | 6.33% |
| 2012 | 896 | 351 | 1,247 | 19,736 | 20,986 | 5.94% |
| 2013 | 2,074 | 1,323 | 3,397 | 19,444 | 22,841 | 14.87% |
| 2014 | 1,135 | 678 | 1,813 | 19,514 | 21,327 | 8.50% |
| 2015 | 336 | 198 | 534 | 19,006 | 19,540 | 2.73% |
| 2016 | 281 | 134 | 415 | 18,862 | 19,277 | 2.15% |
| 2017 | 255 | 130 | 385 | 19,042 | 19,427 | 1.98% |
| 2018 | 226 | 110 | 336 | 17,773 | 18,109 | 1.86% |
| 2019 | 191 | 121 | 312 | 16,737 | 17,049 | 1.83% |
| 2020 | 234 | 113 | 347 | 15,161 | 15,508 | 2.24% |
| 2021 | 227 | 96 | 323 | 16,699 | 17,022 | 1.90% |
| 2022 | 264 | 141 | 405 | 16,256 | 16,661 | 2.43% |
| 2023 | 223 | 130 | 353 | 15,425 | 15,778 | 2.24% |

== Public opinion ==
Public opinion for same-sex marriage in Iowa
| Poll source | Dates administered | Sample size | Margin of error | Support | Opposition | Do not know / refused |
|---|---|---|---|---|---|---|
| Public Religion Research Institute | February 28 – December 8, 2025 | 231 adults | ? | 58% | 37% | 5% |
| Public Religion Research Institute | March 13 – December 2, 2024 | 211 adults | ? | 67% | 28% | 5% |
| Public Religion Research Institute | March 9 – December 7, 2023 | 207 adults | ? | 60% | 35% | 5% |
| Public Religion Research Institute | March 11 – December 14, 2022 | ? | ? | 75% | 20% | 5% |
| Public Religion Research Institute | March 8 – November 9, 2021 | ? | ? | 72% | 23% | 5% |
| Public Religion Research Institute | January 7 – December 20, 2020 | 528 adults | ? | 62% | 30% | 8% |
| Public Religion Research Institute | April 5 – December 23, 2017 | 895 adults | ? | 59% | 33% | 8% |
| Public Religion Research Institute | May 18, 2016 – January 10, 2017 | 1,325 adults | ? | 59% | 31% | 10% |
| Public Religion Research Institute | April 29, 2015 – January 7, 2016 | 1,103 adults | ? | 56% | 35% | 9% |
| Public Religion Research Institute | April 2, 2014 – January 4, 2015 | 681 adults | ? | 57% | 37% | 6% |
| New York Times/CBS News/YouGov | September 20 – October 1, 2014 | 2,359 likely voters | ± 2.2% | 53% | 33% | 14% |
| Public Policy Polling | February 20–23, 2014 | 869 voters | ± 3.3% | 47% | 44% | 9% |
| Public Policy Polling | July 5–7, 2013 | 668 registered voters | ± 3.8% | 46% | 45% | 9% |
| Public Policy Polling | February 1–3, 2013 | 846 voters | ? | 46% | 43% | 11% |
| Public Policy Polling | August 19–21, 2011 | 798 voters | ± 3.5% | 46% | 45% | 9% |

== See also ==
- Jene Newsome
- LGBT rights in Iowa
- Same-sex marriage in the United States
- Same-sex marriage legislation in the United States
- Same-sex marriage status in the United States by state
