= LGBTQ rights in Iowa =

- Iowa (US)
- Legal status: Legal since 1978
- Gender identity: Legal gender/sex defined at birth based on gametes expected to be produced later in life. Gender changes legally unrecognized for transgender and non-binary individuals, regardless of hormonal or surgical interventions.
- Discrimination protections: Sexual orientation protected. Gender identity was formerly protected from 2007–2025.

Family rights
- Recognition of relationships: Same-sex marriage since 2009
- Adoption: Same-sex couples allowed to adopt

Lesbian, gay, bisexual, transgender, and queer (LGBTQ) rights in the U.S. state of Iowa have evolved significantly in the 21st century. Iowa began issuing marriage licenses to same-sex couples on April 27, 2009, following a ruling by the Iowa Supreme Court, making Iowa the fourth (Note: At the time of Iowa legalization, only two states prior has permanently legalized same-sex marriage. California legalized it prior to Iowa, but also reversed that legalization. Making Iowa the fourth state chronologically, but the third state permanently.) U.S. state to legalize same-sex marriage. Same-sex couples may also adopt, and state laws ban discrimination based on sexual orientation in employment, housing and public accommodations. In February 2025, the Iowa Legislature passed a bill with a 'veto-proof majority' to completely remove "gender identity" from the state's anti-discrimination laws—a measure that was originally implemented in 2007. Iowa governor Kim Reynolds signed the bill into law, which went into effect on July 1, making Iowa the first state to remove anti-discrimination protections for any class of people.

== History and legality of same-sex sexual activity ==
Prior to European settlement of Iowa in the early 19th century, several Native American tribes inhabited the area. These include the Dakota and Omaha peoples. Among these people groups, perceptions toward gender and sexuality differed significantly from that of the Western world. The Dakota recognize individuals known as winkta who were assigned male at birth but act and behave as women. Likewise, the Omaha refer to such individuals as mix'uga.

When the Iowa Territory was established in 1838, it adopted all its laws from the Wisconsin Territory. This included an anti-sodomy law providing punishment of up to three years' imprisonment. In 1843, shortly before statehood, the Iowa Territorial Legislature enacted Iowa's first criminal code. It made no mention to sodomy, making it legal in Iowa. In 1860, the Iowa Supreme Court, in the case of Estes v. Carter, noted the lack of such a law. The state made no effort to overturn this decision or enact a sodomy law.

In 1892, a statute was enacted, providing for imprisonment of between one and ten years for sodomy, whether heterosexual or homosexual. The law punished consensual activity as well. The first criminal conviction occurred in 1900, in the case of State v. Todd. Fellatio (oral sex), whether heterosexual or homosexual, was made criminal in 1902. Over the following years, the courts convicted multiple people of sodomy. In 1911, the state passed a sterilization law, under which "moral or sexual perverts" could be sterilized; anyone twice convicted would be immediately sterilized. In 1914, the U.S. District Court for the Eastern District of Iowa overturned this law as unconstitutional. The state appealed, and in 1917, in Davis v. Berry et al., the U.S. Supreme Court upheld the lower court ruling. 49 people were sterilized under the law. In 1929, however, the state enacted a new sterilization law. This law, different from the previous one as it guaranteed some due process rights to the defendants, was not overturned until 1977. By 1948, 891 Iowans had been sterilized under the statute. In 1955, the state passed a psychopathic offender law, under which any person "having criminal propensities toward the commission of sex offenses" would be treated as "mental psychopaths" and sent to psychiatric hospitals. That same year, the murder of a boy in Sioux City led to the mass detention of several gay men who were sent to asylums, despite none of them having been convicted of the crime.

In 1976, in a bitterly divided 5–4 ruling, the Iowa Supreme Court held that heterosexual sodomy could not be prosecuted. "There [is] no compelling state interest in the manner of sexual relations performed in private between consenting adults of the opposite sex not married to each other", the court wrote. It did not address same-sex sexual activity in its ruling.

The state's law criminalizing same-sex sexual activity was repealed in 1978. Following the 1976 Supreme Court ruling, which held that heterosexual relations could not be prosecuted under the state's sodomy statute, the Iowa General Assembly passed a comprehensive criminal code which made no mention to sodomy. The age of consent is 16, regardless of gender and sexual orientation.

== Recognition of same-sex relationships ==
In 1976, Tracy Lee Bjorgum and Kenneth Bunch, from Solon, Iowa, filed one of the first lawsuits in the country seeking the right of same-sex couples to marry. Lee Bjorgum was a 20-year-old student at the University of Iowa. Bunch was a custodian at the University of Iowa hospitals, as well as a spokesperson for the Gay Liberation Front. Saying they wanted "the right to exist", the men appeared in Johnson County District Court, and requested a marriage license. It was denied. Months later they did the same in Polk County, were again denied, and the ACLU of Iowa filed a lawsuit on their behalf, but the lawsuit was unsuccessful.

Iowa has provided benefits to same-sex partners of state employees since 2003.

Iowa has allowed for state recognition of same-sex marriages performed in and out of the state since April 3, 2009, after the Iowa Supreme Court unanimously upheld a ruling by the Polk County District Court in Varnum v. Brien which effectively forced the state to rescind any outstanding discrimination against same-sex couples who wish to have their marriages recognized and licensed under state law. Iowa marriage licenses were issued to same-sex couples for the first time on April 27, 2009.

In response to the decision, several attempts to amend the state Constitution, either by presenting a ballot initiative before the voters or calling a state constitutional convention, to ban same-sex marriage failed.

Three of the Iowa Supreme Court justices who participated in Varnum were removed from office as the result of judicial retention elections in November 2010, following a campaign by groups opposed to same-sex marriage. However, in November 2012, a fourth member of the Iowa Supreme Court that participated in Varnum was retained after vigorous campaigning by groups opposed to same-sex marriage and groups supporting same-sex marriage and judicial independence.

=== Methodist church within Iowa ===
In February 2022, it was reported that effective since January 1, 2022 that the United Methodist Church within Iowa itself does permit recognition and practice of same-sex marriage.

== Adoption and parenting ==
Joint adoption by married same-sex couples has been legal since a ruling by the Iowa Supreme Court in 2008. Iowa law allows individuals and married couples, regardless of sexual orientation, to adopt.

On December 12, 2012, ruling in Buntemeyer v. Iowa DPH, a state court ordered the Iowa Department of Public Health to list the names of two women, a married lesbian couple, on the death certificate of their stillborn son. The Iowa Supreme Court heard arguments that same day in the department's appeal of a decision in Gartner v. Newton that ordered it to enter the names of two women as parents on a birth certificate. On May 3, 2013, the court unanimously affirmed the lower court's ruling in Gartner and said that "By naming the nonbirthing spouse on the birth certificate of a married lesbian couple's child, the child is ensured support from that parent and the parent establishes fundamental legal rights at the moment of birth".

Lesbian couples have access to in vitro fertilization and fertility treatments. State law recognizes the non-genetic, non-gestational mother as a legal parent to a child born via donor insemination, but only if the parents are married. Although Iowa does not possess any defined surrogacy laws, courts are generally favorable to couples, different-sex or same-sex, who use the gestational or traditional surrogacy process.

== Discrimination protections ==
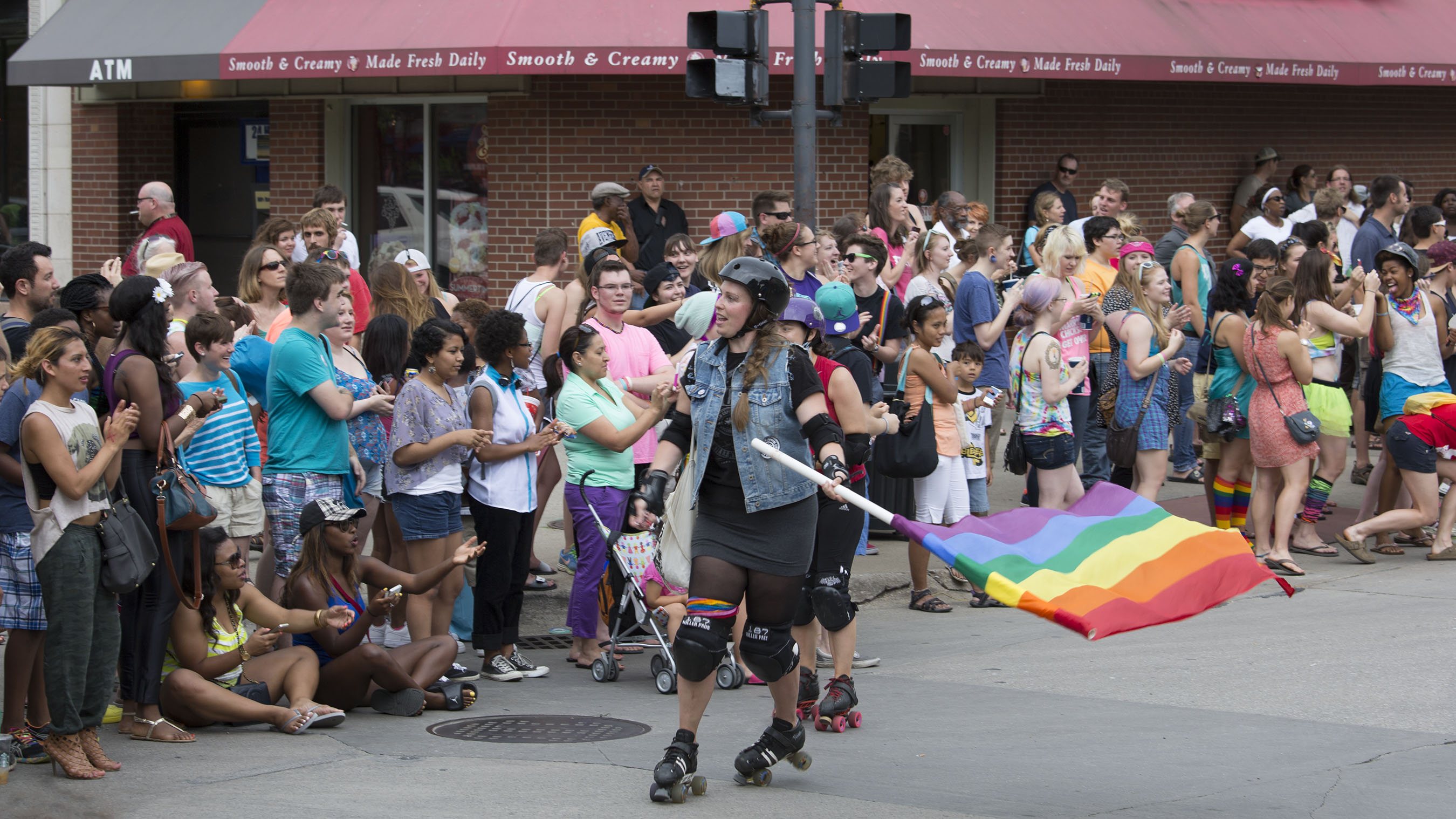
Iowa City Pride parade, 2014

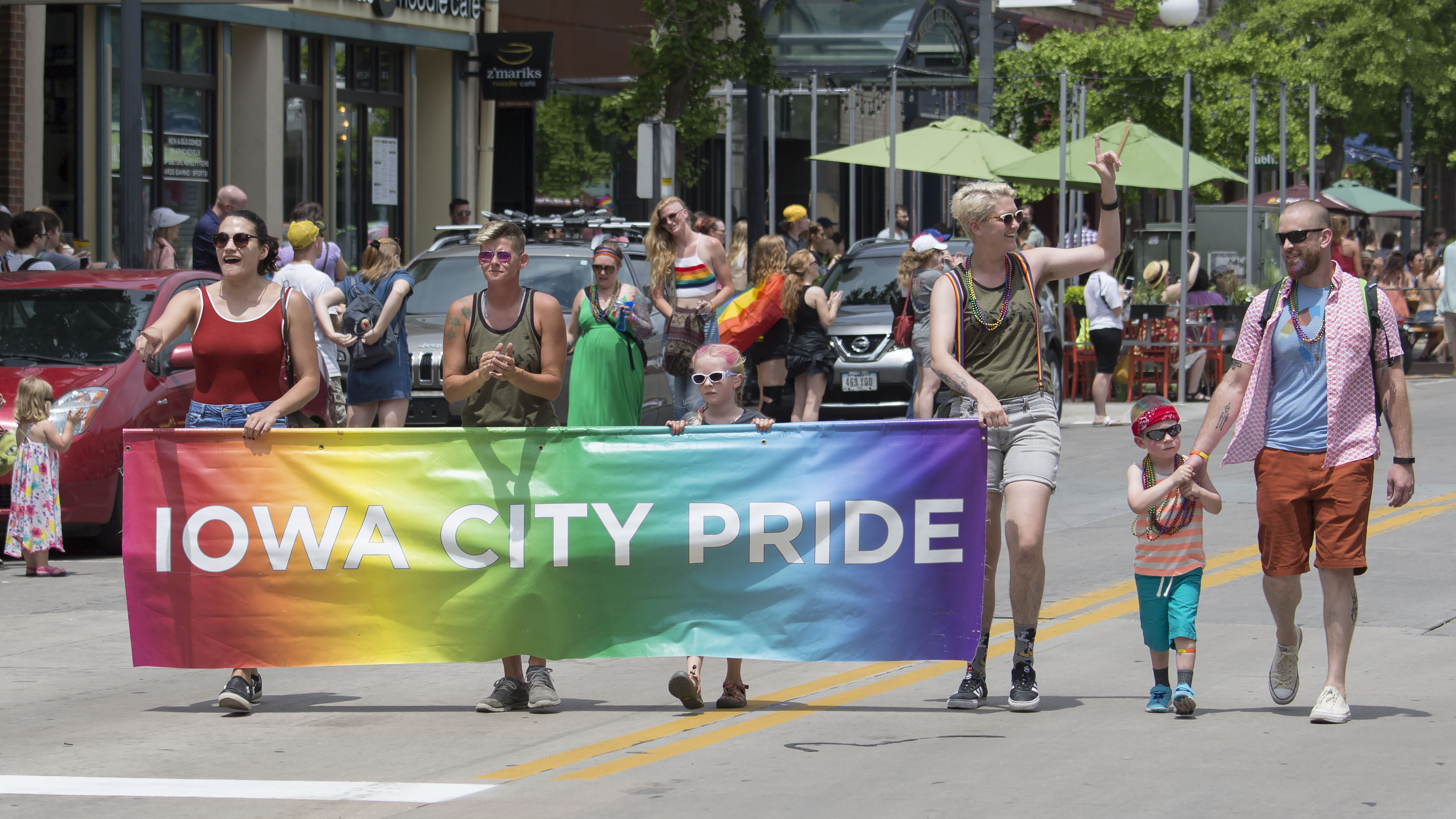
Iowa City Pride in 2017

Since 2007, Iowa has outlawed discrimination on the basis of sexual orientation and gender identity in employment, housing and public accommodations. The state's largest city, Des Moines, has had a non-discrimination ordinance of its own since 1991.

In February 2025, under enacted Iowa legislation - gender identity was formally removed from anti-discrimination laws and goes into effect from July 1. Iowa became the first US state to formally remove 'gender identity' from any civil rights and anti-discrimination legislation. Iowa also became the first state in the Nation to take any protected group away from Civil Rights protections.

== Hate crime law ==
Iowa's hate crime law provides penalty enhancements for crimes committed on the basis of the victim's sexual orientation, but not gender identity.

On March 8, 2016, the Iowa Senate approved a bill, in a 27–21 vote, that would have added gender identity to the law. However, the bill subsequently died without a vote in the Republican-controlled House.

Although Iowa's hate crime law does not cover gender identity, U.S. federal law has covered this category since the Matthew Shepard and James Byrd, Jr. Hate Crimes Prevention Act was signed into law in October 2009.

== Transgender rights ==
As of July 1, 2025, transgender people in Iowa may not alter their legal gender, such as on government IDs or documents, or be legally recognized differently from their assigned sex. This was enacted by Senate File 418 during the 2025 Iowa Legislative Session. The bill stripped gender transition language (added in 2007) from the Iowa Code and implements an unchangeable, binary legal definition of sex, determined at birth, based on the gametes expected to be produced later in life.

In March 2019, the Iowa Supreme Court declared that sex reassignment surgery must be covered under the state's Medicaid program. However, a month later, the Iowa General Assembly quickly passed a bill in the final hours of the legislative session, banning state funding for sex reassignment surgeries, which reversed the Supreme Court ruling. Days later, the bill was signed into law by Governor Kim Reynolds. In November 2021, a Polk County District Court judge ruled that this ban was unconstitutional. In June 2025, Governor Reynolds signed another law banning Medicaid coverage for transgender surgeries and hormone treatments. The ban went into effect on July 1, 2025.

=== Sports ===
In March 2022, the Iowa General Assembly passed a bill, which was signed into law by Governor of Iowa Kim Reynolds, that uses "sex at birth" to limit women's sports to cisgender females only, effectively barring transgender girls and women from participation. The bill also gives legal cause for civil lawsuits for "any direct or indirect harm as a result of a violation". The bill applied to all accredited educational institutions, public or private, including post-secondary institutions such as colleges and universities. The law went into effect on July 1, 2022.

=== Gender-affirming healthcare ban on children ===
In March 2023, Senate File 538 passed both houses of the Iowa General Assembly, banning the provision of any and all gender-affirming healthcare to transgender minors within Iowa. Governor Kim Reynolds signed the bill, which took effect immediately. For minors who are currently receiving gender-affirming care, healthcare providers must cease providing it to that person within 180 days.

=== Bathroom bill ===
In March 2023, a bill passed both houses of the Iowa General Assembly to require students to have written permission from a parent or guardian before using a single-person restroom at school.

=== Civil rights protections ===
In 2025, Iowa passed a law stripping nondiscrimination protections from trans people within the state. In response, several cities passed their own protections, but the following year in 2026, Iowa passed a bill in response banning localities from having civil rights protections stronger or more broad than those provided by the state government.

== Classroom law ==
In May 2023, the Governor of Iowa signed a bill into law (that passed the Iowa Legislature) which officially banned "sexual orientation and gender identity lessons within Iowa school classrooms between Kindergarten to grade 6".

== Conversion therapy ==
On March 17, 2015, the Iowa Senate voted 26–24 to ban sexual orientation change efforts (conversion therapy) on LGBT minors. The bill, however, died without a vote in the Republican-controlled Iowa House of Representatives.

On April 8, 2016, the Iowa Board of Medicine announced it would look into a proposal to ban the use of conversion therapy on LGBT minors. The board, however, denied a petition from members of the State of Iowa Youth Advisory Council which wanted an administrative rule prohibiting Iowa doctors from practicing conversion therapy on minors. Instead, the board said it would form a subcommittee to study the topic. On August 12, the board declined to take action on a ban.

On August 12, 2016, the Iowa Board of Psychology voted down a proposal to prohibit state-licensed professionals from engaging in conversion therapy. The board unanimously agreed that such practices should be banned; however, they argued that this was the responsibility of the General Assembly. The board added that any person may file a complaint if there are concerns about a psychologist's practice and any complaint regarding conversion therapy employed by a licensed psychologist will be investigated.

In April 2020, Davenport became the first city in Iowa to pass an ordinance banning conversion therapy on minors. The ordinance was approved 8–2 by the Davenport City Council on April 22, 2020.

== Gay panic defense ==
In March 2020, the state House of Representatives unanimously passed a bill by a vote of 95–0 to abolish the gay panic defence. The Iowa House of Representatives has passed this legislation twice now, but both times the Republican controlled Iowa Senate has refused to take up the legislation, while still finding time to legislate that governmental agencies and entities, school districts, and public postsecondary educational institutions are banned from teaching so-called "divisive concepts" based on race or sex. This legislation has the opportunity to open the door to further discrimination against LGBTQ+ individuals, denying educators and others tasked with training and teaching the history of oppression faced by LGBTQ+ individuals and especially those who are Black, Indigenous, People of Color, while protecting conservative ideas.

== Public opinion ==
A 2017 Public Religion Research Institute (PRRI) opinion poll found that 59% of Iowans supported same-sex marriage, while 33% opposed it and 7% were unsure. The same poll found that 68% of Iowans supported an anti-discrimination law covering sexual orientation and gender identity, 23% were opposed. Furthermore, 55% were against allowing public businesses to refuse to serve LGBTQ people due to religious beliefs, while 37% supported allowing such religiously based refusals.

A 2022 Public Religion Research Institute (PRRI) poll found that 75% of Iowans support same-sex marriage, while 20% were opposed and 4% were unsure. The same poll found that 85% of Iowans supported an anti-discrimination law covering sexual orientation and gender identity. 11% were opposed.

Public opinion for LGBT anti-discrimination laws in Iowa
Poll source	Date(s) administered	Sample size	Margin of error	% support	% opposition	% no opinion
Public Religion Research Institute	January 2-December 30, 2019	622	?	69%	24%	7%
Public Religion Research Institute	January 3-December 30, 2018	723	?	68%	28%	4%
Public Religion Research Institute	April 5-December 23, 2017	895	?	68%	23%	9%
Public Religion Research Institute	April 29, 2015-January 7, 2016	1,103	?	71%	24%	5%

== Summary table ==
Same-sex sexual activity legal	Yes (Since 1978)
Equal age of consent (16)	Yes (Since 1978)
Anti-discrimination laws covering sexual orientation	Yes (Since 2007)
Anti-discrimination laws covering gender identity	No / Yes (From 2007 to 2025; gender identity no longer covered and removed effective July 1, 2025 under enacted Iowa laws)
Same-sex marriages	Yes (Since 2009)
Joint and stepchild adoption by same-sex couples	Yes (Since 2008)
Lesbian, gay, and bisexual people allowed to serve openly in the military	Yes (Since 2011)
Transgender people allowed to serve openly in the military	(Since 2025, per Executive Order 14183)
Intersex people allowed to serve openly in the military	(Current DoD policy bans "hermaphrodites" from serving or enlisting in the military)
Right to change legal gender	(as of July 1, 2025, previously legal gender changes could occur)
Conversion therapy banned on minors	No / Yes (Davenport only)
Abolition of the gay panic defense	X
Access to IVF for lesbian couples	Yes
Surrogacy arrangements legal for gay male couples	Yes
MSMs allowed to donate blood	Yes (Since 2023, FDA condition of being monogamous)
