= Dana Oxley =

American judge (born 1967)

Justice of the Iowa Supreme Court
- Incumbent
- Assumed office January 28, 2020
- Appointed by: Kim Reynolds
- Preceded by: Mark Cady

Personal details
- Born: Dana Leanne Wade; December 21, 1967 (age 58)
- Party: Republican
- Spouse: Randy Oxley
- Children: Ryan, Taylor
- Education: University of Northern Iowa (BA); University of Iowa (JD)

Dana Leanne Oxley (née Wade, born December 21, 1967) is an associate justice of the Iowa Supreme Court.

== Education ==
Oxley earned a Bachelor of Arts in accounting from the University of Northern Iowa in 1990. She earned her Juris Doctor from the University of Iowa College of Law in 1998. In law school, she was articles editor of the Journal of Corporation Law, graduated third in her class, and was elected to the Order of the Coif.

== Legal and academic career ==
Oxley joined the Cedar Rapids law firm Shuttleworth & Ingersoll in 1999. She then served as a career law clerk for Judge David R. Hansen of the United States Court of Appeals for the Eighth Circuit from 2001 to 2011. When Hansen retired in 2011, Oxley returned to Shuttleworth & Ingersoll and specialized in civil appellate litigation. She taught at the University of Iowa College of Law in 2007, 2011, and from 2014 until her appointment to the Iowa Supreme Court. She also served as an editor of the Eighth Circuit Appellate Practice Manual.

== Appointment to Iowa Supreme Court ==
On January 28, 2020, Governor Kim Reynolds appointed Oxley to the Iowa Supreme Court to fill the vacancy created by the death of Mark Cady. Oxley took office on February 24, 2020.

Iowa selected Oxley through the assisted appointment method, in which the State Judicial Nominating Commission submits three nominees to the governor. Oxley was Reynolds' third appointment to the Iowa Supreme Court and her appointment marked the first time two women served simultaneously on the Iowa Supreme Court. Governor Reynolds also appointed Joel Barrows and Matthew McDermott to the court along with Oxley. Oxley's current term is set to expire on December 21, 2030.

Oxley has stated that, before joining the court, her legal experience consisted entirely of private practice and that she values the differing perspectives of her colleagues on the bench. The Iowa Judicial Branch featured Oxley on its podcast in August 2022 to discuss differences between the Iowa Constitution and the United States Constitution.

Oxley participated in the Iowa Supreme Court's 2022 decision in Planned Parenthood of the Heartland v. Reynolds, a case that overruled the court's 2018 precedent recognizing abortion as a fundamental right under the Iowa Constitution. The decision replaced strict scrutiny review of abortion regulations with the undue burden standard.

== Professional associations ==
Oxley is a member of the Iowa State Bar Association, the Linn County Bar Association, and the Eighth Circuit Bar Association.

== Personal life ==
Oxley was born in Neosho, Missouri and grew up on a farm near Greenfield, Iowa.

Oxley and her husband, Randy, have two children, Ryan and Taylor, and reside in Swisher, Iowa.

Before choosing to attend law school, Oxley worked as a bank auditor.

Shortly before entering law school, Oxley learned she was pregnant. She had her first child in the fall of her first year and her second during the spring of her third year.

Legal offices
| Preceded by Mark Cady | Justice of the Iowa Supreme Court; 2020–present | Incumbent |
