= Bruce B. Zager =

American judge (born 1952)

Associate Justice of the Iowa Supreme Court
- In office 2011 – September 3, 2018
- Appointed by: Terry Branstad
- Preceded by: David L. Baker
- Succeeded by: Susan Christensen

Personal details
- Born: December 11, 1952 (age 73) Waterloo, Iowa
- Education: University of Iowa (BA); Drake University Law School (JD)

Bruce B. Zager (born December 11, 1952) is a former justice of the Iowa Supreme Court.

== Education ==
Zager was born and raised in Waterloo, Iowa. Zager was a high school classmate of David L. Baker, who he eventually replaced on the Iowa Supreme Court. Zager graduated from the University of Iowa in 1975, from Loyola University in 1977 and from Drake University Law School in 1980.

== Legal and judicial career ==
From 1981 to 1999, Zager practiced in Waterloo. He was a part-time Black Hawk County attorney for twelve of those years. He was appointed to be a judge of the Iowa District Court in 1999. Zager was then appointed to the Iowa Supreme Court in 2011, after Iowa voters had removed three justices seeking reelection in response to the court unanimously legalizing same-sex marriage in Varnum v. Brien. Zager retired from the Iowa Supreme Court on September 3, 2018. Zager currently serves as the lone senior judge of the Iowa Supreme Court.

Political offices
Preceded by David L. Baker	Justice of the Iowa Supreme Court; 2011–2018	Succeeded by Susan Christensen
