= Susan Christensen =

American judge (born 1962)

Chief Justice of the Iowa Supreme Court
- Incumbent
- Assumed office February 24, 2020
- Preceded by: David Wiggins (Acting)

Associate Justice of the Iowa Supreme Court
- Incumbent
- Assumed office September 21, 2018
- Appointed by: Kim Reynolds
- Preceded by: Bruce B. Zager

Personal details
- Born: April 27, 1962 (age 64) Harlan, Iowa, US
- Party: Republican
- Education: Judson University (BA); Creighton University (JD)

Susan Larson Christensen (born April 27, 1962) is an American lawyer who has served as an associate justice of the Iowa Supreme Court since 2018 and as the chief justice since 2020.

== Education ==
Christensen received an undergraduate degree in psychology from Judson University, where she was valedictorian and graduated with highest honors. She then received a Juris Doctor degree cum laude from Creighton University School of Law.

== Career ==
Christensen practiced law in Harlan, Iowa, at the firm Larson, Childs, Hall & Christensen from 1991 to 2003, specializing in family law. She then worked as a sole practitioner specializing in family law from 2003 to 2007. She was also a prosecutor, working as an assistant county attorney for Shelby County from 1991 to 2007, for Harrison County from 1996 to 2007, and for Crawford County in 2007. She is a part of the Iowa State Bar Association.

=== State court service ===
Christensen was an associate judge for the Iowa Fourth Judicial District from 2007 to 2015 then a district judge for the same district from 2015 until her appointment to the Iowa Supreme Court.

=== Appointment to Iowa Supreme Court ===
Christensen was one of three finalists sent to the governor for consideration after the retirement of Justice Bruce B. Zager. In August 2018 Governor Kim Reynolds appointed Christensen to the Iowa Supreme Court. On September 21, 2018, she was sworn into office. Christensen is Reynolds' first appointment to the Iowa Supreme Court. She became the first female since 2011 and the third female overall to join the court.

On February 24, 2020, she was selected to be the chief justice of the Iowa Supreme Court, following the death of Mark Cady. In 2025, she was re-elected as Chief Justice.

== Personal life ==
Christensen was born and raised in Harlan, Iowa where her husband Jay serves as mayor. She has five children and eight grandchildren with Jay. Her father was former justice Jerry L. Larson who served on the Iowa Supreme Court from 1978 to 2008. Her brother Jeffrey Larson is a judge of the Iowa Fourth Judicial District. She is a registered Republican.

Legal offices
| Preceded by Bruce B. Zager | Associate Justice of the Iowa Supreme Court; 2018–present | Incumbent |
| Preceded by David Wiggins; Acting | Chief Justice of the Iowa Supreme Court; 2020–present | Incumbent |
