= Thomas D. Waterman =

American judge (born 1959)

Thomas Waterman

Associate Justice of the Iowa Supreme Court
- Incumbent
- Assumed office February 23, 2011
- Appointed by: Terry Branstad
- Preceded by: Marsha Ternus

Personal details
- Born: Thomas Dana Waterman; 1959 (age 65–66) Davenport, Iowa, U.S.
- Education: Dartmouth College (AB); University of Iowa (JD)

Thomas D. Waterman (born 1959) is a justice of the Iowa Supreme Court.

== Education ==
Waterman was born in Davenport, Iowa. He graduated from Bettendorf High School and received a degree in history from Dartmouth College in 1981. He then graduated Order of the Coif in the top five percent of his class from the University of Iowa College of Law in 1984.

== Legal career ==
Waterman practiced for 27 years at the Davenport law firm Lane & Waterman LLP. He was a fourth-generation partner in the firm and specialized in civil trial and appellate litigation. Waterman was ranked in Band 1 for commercial litigation by Chambers and Partners and was also recognized by The Best Lawyers in America. He was also a member of the Iowa State Judicial Nominating Commission and the American College of Trial Lawyers.

== Iowa Supreme Court ==
Waterman was one of three justices appointed by Iowa Governor Terry Branstad in 2011. In November 2010, Iowa voters had removed all three justices seeking reelection in response to the court unanimously legalizing same-sex marriage in Varnum v. Brien. Waterman is an elected member of the American Law Institute. He is the second member of his family to serve on the Iowa Supreme Court after Charles M. Waterman, who founded Lane & Waterman.

In 2019, Waterman spoke with state Representative Steven Holt, the floor manager of a bill to modify procedures for choosing judges and the chief justice's term. Michael Gartner reported that the bill was a "power grab" by Waterman and his allies, who lobbied the legislature and wanted Waterman to replace Mark Cady before his term expired. Unlike Cady, Waterman refused to disclose his contacts with legislators or recuse himself in the ensuing litigation. Waterman subsequently took part in a 4-2 decision to refer the case to the Iowa Court of Appeals, which dismissed the lawsuit 3–2 on standing grounds, following which the Iowa Supreme Court declined review.
