= Zager =

Zager is a surname. Notable people with the surname include:

- Bruce B. Zager (born 1952), American justice of the Iowa Supreme Court
- Denny Zager (born 1944), American musician and half of the duo Zager and Evans, rock-pop duo
- Michael Zager (born 1943), American record producer
- Samuel Zager, American politician

== See also ==
- Zagers
