= David Wiggins (judge) =

American judge

Chief Justice of the Iowa Supreme Court Acting
- In office November 15, 2019 – February 24, 2020
- Preceded by: Mark Cady
- Succeeded by: Susan Christensen

Associate Justice of the Iowa Supreme Court
- In office October 7, 2003 – March 13, 2020
- Appointed by: Tom Vilsack
- Preceded by: Linda K. Neuman
- Succeeded by: Matthew McDermott

Personal details
- Born: October 19, 1951 (age 74) Chicago, Illinois, U.S.
- Education: University of Illinois, Chicago (BA); Drake University (JD)

David Stewart Wiggins (born October 19, 1951) is a former Justice of the Iowa Supreme Court.

== Education ==
Wiggins was born in Chicago and graduated from Niles East High School. He was the first in his family to attend college and received a bachelor's degree from the University of Illinois at Chicago in 1973. He then attended Drake University Law School While there, he was an associate editor of the Drake Law Review. He graduated with honors and Order of the Coif in 1976.

== Legal career ==
Wiggins began his career with the Des Moines based firm Williams, Hart, Lavorato & Kirtley. He made partner in 1979. The firm was eventually renamed Wiggins, Anderson, & Tully.

As a private practitioner, Wiggins served on the Iowa Commission on Judicial Qualifications, the Supreme Court Advisory Commission on Judicial Redistricting, the Supreme Court Advisory Committee on Rules of Civil Procedure, and the Supreme Court Committee on the Cost of Litigation. Wiggins also served on the Board of Governors of the Iowa State Bar Association, was president of the Iowa Trial Lawyers Association, was senior counsel for the American College of Barristers, and was master emeritus of the C. Edwin Moore American Inns of Court.

== Iowa Supreme Court ==
He was appointed by Governor Tom Vilsack to the Supreme Court in 2003. He was the first Jewish Justice on the Iowa Supreme Court. As the senior Associate Justice, Wiggins chaired the Iowa State Judicial Nominating Commission from 2011 until Kim Reynolds changed the Commission's structure to remove him as the chair and strengthen the governor's control of the committee. Following the death of Chief Justice Mark Cady, Wiggins was acting Chief Justice from November 21, 2019 to February 24, 2020. While serving as Chief Justice, Wiggins announced his intention to retire on March 13, 2020.

=== 2012 retention ===
Wiggins' term was scheduled to end on December 31, 2012. Wiggins had supported the 2009 Varnum v. Brien which declared the ban on same-sex marriage unconstitutional. In the 2010 election, three justices who had supported the decision were ousted, and Wiggins faced a major retention fight in 2012. Wiggins was retained in 2012 with 54.61% of the vote.

Legal offices
Preceded by Mark Cady	Chief Justice of the Iowa Supreme Court; Acting; 2019–2020	Succeeded by Susan Christensen
