= Matthew McDermott =

American judge (born 1977)

Associate Justice of the Iowa Supreme Court
- Incumbent
- Assumed office April 3, 2020
- Appointed by: Kim Reynolds
- Preceded by: David Wiggins

Personal details
- Born: Matthew Charles McDermott; November 22, 1977 (age 48)
- Education: University of Iowa (BA); University of California, Berkeley (JD)

Matthew Charles McDermott (born November 22, 1977) is an American lawyer who has served an associate justice of the Iowa Supreme Court since 2020.

In 2024, he wrote the majority ruling on the Iowa Supreme Court that implemented a six-week abortion ban. McDermott wrote that the abortion ban was "rationally related to the state’s legitimate interest in protecting unborn life."

== Early life and education ==
McDermott grew up in Carroll, Iowa and received a Bachelor of Arts with distinction and honors in economics and political science from the University of Iowa in 2000. He then attended the UC Berkeley School of Law, receiving a Juris Doctor in 2003. At Berkeley, he was executive editor of the California Law Review and taught in the political science department.

== Career ==
While in law school, McDermott worked as a summer associate at Cravath, Swaine & Moore in New York City. He also volunteered at the East Bay Community Law Center.

McDermott turned down an offer at Cravath and instead worked at the Des Moines law firm Belin McCormick P.C., where he was a partner specializing in civil litigation and criminal defense as well as, for a time, firm president. His clients included the State of Iowa, the Republican Party of Iowa, and Kim Reynolds. He was recognized by Chambers and Partners for his commercial litigation practice from 2012 to 2020 and won "Lawyer of the Year" awards for litigation in 2015 and 2020 from The Best Lawyers in America. At the firm, he worked with two other future justices of the Iowa Supreme Court, Edward Mansfield and Christopher McDonald, as well as with future federal judge Stephen H. Locher.

In addition to his private practice, McDermott was the president and a member of the board of directors of Iowa Legal Aid. He served as Iowa counsel to the John McCain 2008 presidential campaign and as a local chair for the Tim Pawlenty 2012 presidential campaign and the Jeb Bush 2016 presidential campaign.

=== Appointment to the Iowa Supreme Court ===
In April 2020, McDermott was appointed by Governor Kim Reynolds to the Iowa Supreme Court to fill the seat vacated by David Wiggins. McDermott was previously an unsuccessful finalist for the seat on the Iowa Supreme Court that went to Dana Oxley and for United States Attorney for the Southern District of Iowa.

Legal offices
| Preceded by David Wiggins | Associate Justice of the Iowa Supreme Court; 2020–present | Incumbent |
