= Michael Streit =

Iowa Supreme Court justice

Associate Justice of the Iowa Supreme Court
- In office 2001–2010
- Appointed by: Tom Vilsack
- Preceded by: Bruce M. Snell, Jr.
- Succeeded by: Edward Mansfield

Personal details
- Born: Michael John Streit; April 14, 1950 (age 76) Sheldon, Iowa, U.S.
- Education: University of Iowa (BA); University of San Diego School of Law (JD)

Michael John Streit (born April 14, 1950) is former justice of the Iowa Supreme Court.

== Education ==
Streit was born and raised in Sheldon, Iowa. He received his bachelor's degree in economics from the University of Iowa in 1972, and his Juris Doctor degree from the University of San Diego School of Law in 1975. In law school, he was the editor in chief of the San Diego Law Review.

== Legal and judicial career ==
After graduating from law school, Streit practiced law at Moore & Shelton in Chariton, Iowa until 1983. In that time, Streit also served as the Lucas County attorney. 1983, Streit was appointed to the Iowa District Court by Terry Branstad. Branstad later appointed Streit to the Iowa Court of Appeals in 1986. In 2001, Tom Vilsack appointed Streit to the Iowa Supreme Court. In 1992, Streit founded the Iowa Judicial Institute.

In 2010, Streit lost a retention vote along with David L. Baker and Marsha Ternus after a campaign against the Iowa Supreme Court's decision in Varnum v. Brien, which struck down a statutory same-sex marriage ban as unconstitutional. In 2012, Streit received a Profile in Courage Award from the John F. Kennedy Library Foundation. He has also received the Distinguished Alumni Award from the University of San Diego and served on the Board of Counselors of Drake University Law School.

After leaving the bench, Streit practiced law at Ahlers & Cooney in Des Moines, Iowa from 2011 to 2018, then at Sullivan & Ward P.C. in West Des Moines from 2018 to the present. He practices mediation, arbitration, and litigation.

Streit is married and has one son.

Political offices
Preceded by	Justice of the Iowa Supreme Court; 2001–2010	Succeeded by Edward Mansfield
