= 2010 Iowa judicial retention elections =

- November 2, 2010
- Outcome: Three Iowa Supreme Court justices removed from office
- Retention of Marsha K. Ternus

Results
Choice	Votes	%
Yes	443,451	45.02%
No	541,565	54.98%
- Results by county
- Retention of Michael J. Streit

Results
Choice	Votes	%
Yes	448,758	45.62%
No	534,902	54.38%
- Results by county
- Retention of David L. Baker

Results
Choice	Votes	%
Yes	451,359	45.86%
No	532,805	54.14%
- Results by county

Three of the seven justices of the Iowa Supreme Court — Marsha K. Ternus, Michael J. Streit, and David L. Baker — faced judicial retention elections on November 2, 2010. As part of merit selection reforms in 1962, Iowa Supreme Court judges face retention elections every eight years. Prior to 2010, retention elections were usually nonpartisan, and Supreme Court justices had been retained by large margins.

Following the Varnum v. Brien decision of 2009, a unanimous Supreme Court ruling which struck down prohibitions on same-sex marriage, a campaign, led primarily by Bob Vander Plaats, was launched advocating against judicial retention. The anti-retention campaign was mainly funded by out-of-state donors. The three justices did not actively campaign for re-election. All three Supreme Court justices were unseated in the vote. This was the first time Supreme Court justices had been unseated in Iowa by retention election, although four lower-court justices had been previously removed in the same manner.

Although Republican Governor Terry Branstad swore in replacement justices in June 2011, efforts to change the court's makeup further in response to Varnum, or to otherwise restrict same-sex marriage by enshrining a ban in the state constitution, were unsuccessful. A 2012 retention vote against David Wiggins, who ruled on Varnum, also failed, and the U.S. Supreme Court would decide Obergefell v. Hodges in 2015, establishing marriage equality nationwide on similar grounds to Varnum.

== Background ==
The state of Iowa first adopted judicial retention elections in 1962. This occurred alongside the implementation of the merit selection process for appointing major trial and appellate judges. Judges appointed through merit selection are shortlisted by a judicial nominating commission, who create a list of prospective judges, from which the state governor then selects a candidate to appoint to the vacant position. The seven justices of the Iowa Supreme Court are appointed to staggered eight-year terms. Three justices were up for retention in 2010: Marsha K. Ternus, Michael J. Streit, and David L. Baker. Ternus, the court's chief justice, had served on the bench since 1993, becoming the chief in 2006, while Streit and Baker had been justices since 2001 and 2008. No Iowa Supreme Court justice prior to 2010 had lost a retention election, with the votes usually considered nonpartisan and the elections not subject to active campaigning. Retention was usually approved by landslide margins, with the average vote for retention of a Supreme Court justice being 80 percent, and the lowest before 2010 being 72 percent.

In the Varnum v. Brien decision of April 2009, Iowa's Defense of Marriage Act was ruled invalid in a unanimous decision by the Iowa Supreme Court. This ruling allowed same-sex couples the right to marry in Iowa, citing protections in the Iowa state constitution:

All laws of a general nature shall have a uniform operation; the general assembly shall not grant to any citizen, or class of citizens, privileges or immunities, which, upon the same terms shall not equally belong to all citizens.

— Constitution of Iowa, Article 1, Section 6

In its opinion, the court stated that they had previously upheld this provision as a broad protection against discrimination on the basis of race and sex, and that there was no valid reason for gay and lesbian couples to be denied the same marriage rights as heterosexual couples.

The ruling upheld a 2007 decision by Polk County judge Robert Hanson, who was also up for recall in 2010. In response to the Varnum ruling, Republican state congressional leaders called for an amendment to the state constitution, which was not advanced by the majority Democratic legislature. Bob Vander Plaats, an attorney from Sioux City, centered his campaign for the Republican gubernatorial nomination in 2010 on overturning the Varnum decision, but was ultimately unsuccessful, losing the primary to former governor Terry Branstad.

== Campaign ==
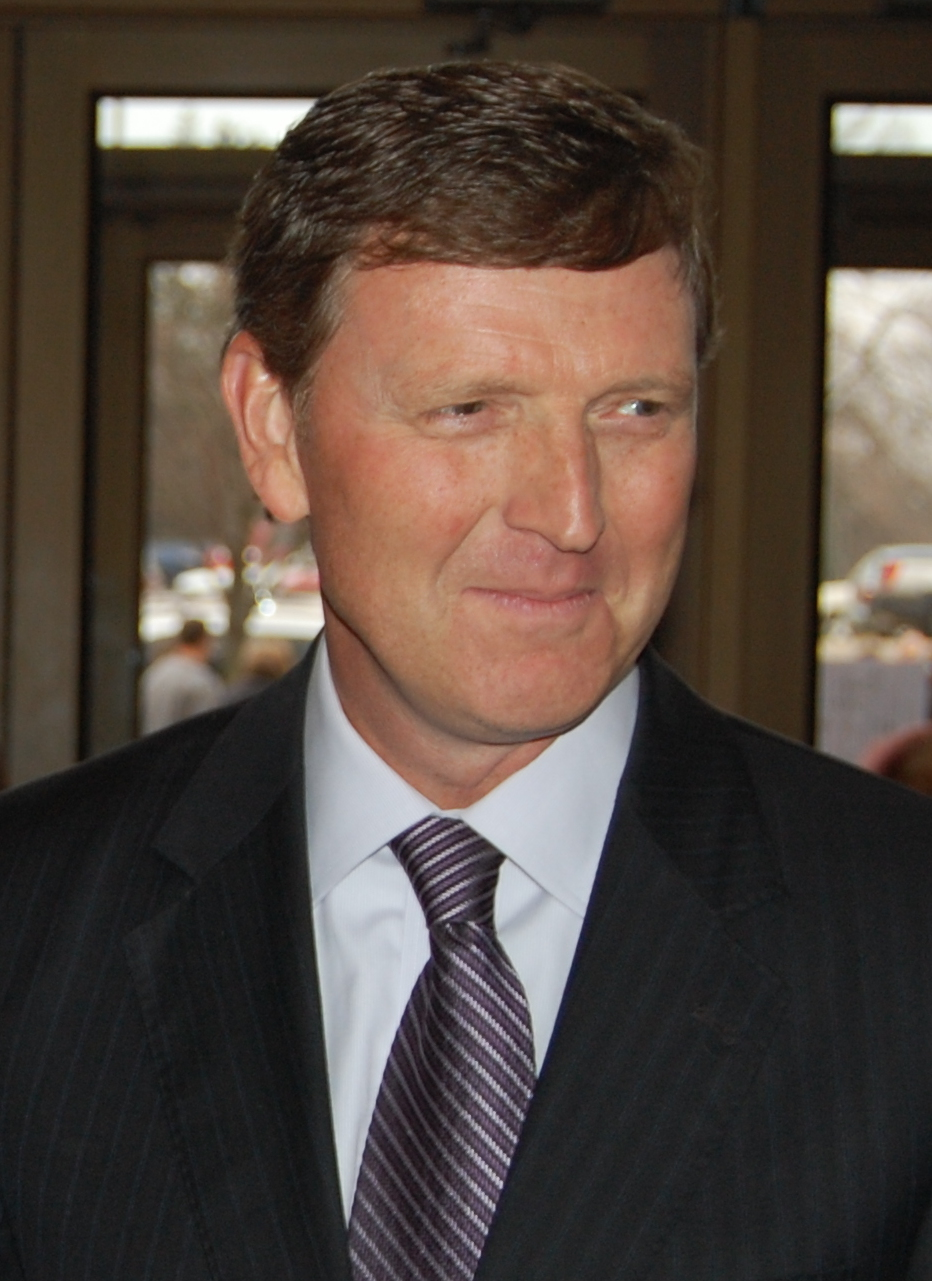
Bob Vander Plaats (pictured) was a key campaigner against judicial retention.

Following his loss in the gubernatorial primary, Vander Plaats announced on August 11, 2010 that he would campaign against the retention of Ternus, Streit, and Baker, creating the group Iowa for Freedom. The anti-retention campaign was funded in large part by an influx of out-of-state support, as Iowa for Freedom was largely financed by the Mississippi-based American Family Association, and $600,000 of advertising was paid for by the New Jersey-based National Organization for Marriage. Vander Plaats was widely labeled as the campaign's leader. Newt Gingrich, a former U.S. House Speaker from Georgia who was a prospective presidential candidate for the 2012 election at the time, assisted in raising money for the campaign, and donated $125,000 to the effort from his political action committee. Gingrich was described by the Los Angeles Times as having a "key behind-the-scenes role" in the campaign against retention. Steve King, who represented Iowa in the United States Congress, led a bus tour advocating against retention of the justices, describing their ruling as judicial activism.

The three justices up for election did not campaign, although they did increase their public appearances across Iowa. The pro-retention campaign was mainly led by the Fair Courts for Us Committee, which did not coalesce until mid-October. The group spent over $350,000 in the election, mainly on radio ads and mailers. A radio ad paid for by Fair Courts for Us compared the Varnum decision to a sports referee's "questionable call", and contained an endorsement for retention from Bob Ray, a former governor of Iowa. Two other groups, Justice Not Politics and Iowans for Fair Courts, focused their campaigning on educational efforts. Sandra Day O'Connor, a justice of the Supreme Court of the United States, addressed the Iowa Bar Association in September, emphasising the importance of courts as places for "a fair and impartial hearing", and stating that judges should not be subjected to "outright retaliation".

Overall, the campaign was described by Andrew J. Clopton and C. Scott Peters as being "one-sided", due to "scarce and poorly communicated" efforts from the pro-retention campaign. The opposition to judicial retention was driven by the Varnum decision, providing campaigners with a "highly salient issue", as Clopton and Peters describe it, to center their efforts on, which was especially relevant given strong evangelical Christian opposition to same-sex marriage.

== Results and reactions ==
In the Iowa general election of November 2, 2010, all three Supreme Court justices up for retention were unseated. The judges were the first Supreme Court justices to be removed through a judicial retention election in Iowa since their 1962 introduction, although four lower-court justices had previously been removed in this way. All 71 lower-court judges who had been up for retention in 2010 retained their seats, including Robert Hanson, who had initially ruled in favour of the Varnum plaintiffs.

The retention election was perceived in large part as a proxy vote on the justices' decision in the Varnum ruling. In The New York Times, A.G. Sulzberger wrote that the outcome of the vote indicated "a statewide repudiation of same-sex marriage". Andrew J. Clopton and C. Scott Peters, writing a 2013 analysis of the election in The Justice System Journal, described the retention vote as the "result of an unprecedented mobilization by opponents of same-sex marriage".

The ousted judges released a statement after the election stating their support for Iowa's merit selection system, but noted a "unprecedented attack by out-of-state special interest groups", and stated that "the preservation of our state’s fair and impartial courts" would "require the steadfast support of the people". Vander Plaats stated his hope that the result would "send a message across the country that the power resides with the people", and said "It’s we the people, not we the courts".

The rate of ballot roll-off, where voters cast ballots for higher offices but fail to vote in lower-salience down-ballot elections, was markedly lower in this election, with a statewide rate of 13.19 percentage points. In contrast, the previous judicial retention votes for Ternus and Streit, held in 2002 alongside a gubernatorial election, had a roll-off of 38.73 percentage points. Counties with higher levels of evangelicals were also likely to experience lower roll-off, suggesting a strong focus on same-sex marriage led opponents of judicial retention to galvanise religious opposition to the policy in the election.

Roy A. Schotland, an emeritus professor at Georgetown Law Center, described three prospective "severely harmful" impacts of the election outcome: judges being made to consider popular reaction to high-visibility cases, sitting judges being more subject to insecurity in their positions, and courts being subject to greater pressure from "public passions".

Retention of Marsha Ternus
Choice	Votes	%
For	443,451	45.02
Against	541,565	54.98
Total	985,016	100.00

Retention of Michael J. Streit
Choice	Votes	%
For	448,758	45.62
Against	534,902	54.38
Total	983,660	100.00

Retention of David L. Baker
Choice	Votes	%
For	451,359	45.86
Against	532,805	54.14
Total	984,164	100.00

== Aftermath ==
As the Chief Justice of the Iowa Supreme Court had been voted out, the four remaining justices were required to choose a new interim chief justice among themselves. On December 2, 2010, the justices elevated Mark Cady, the author of the decision in Varnum, to chief justice. Three justices were sworn into the Iowa Supreme Court in June 2011 by Governor Terry Branstad: Thomas Waterman, Edward Mansfield, and Bruce Zager. The three ousted justices were awarded a Profile in Courage award by Caroline Kennedy on behalf of the John F. Kennedy Library Foundation in May 2012.

Following the 2010 judicial retention elections, five Republican members of the Iowa House of Representatives launched impeachment resolutions against the remaining four Supreme Court justices. However, the attempt faced intense opposition in the House, with Republican Rich Anderson, who chaired the House Judiciary Committee, correctly predicting that the resolution would die in committee. An attempt was also made to amend the Iowa constitution to ban same-sex marriage, which was supported by Governor Branstad but blocked by Democrats in control of the Iowa Senate, who refused to let the proposal reach the floor.

Vander Plaats and the National Organisation for Marriage again waged a campaign in 2012 to unseat David Wiggins, who had also ruled on the Varnum case. However, Wiggins successfully retained his seat with 54 percent of the vote. Todd E. Pettys lists a number of reasons for Wiggins' success, including increased acceptance of same-sex marriage, larger Democratic turnout given the presidential re-election campaign of Barack Obama, and a campaign from the Iowa State Bar Association supporting retention.

In June 2015, the U.S. Supreme Court decided Obergefell v. Hodges, which used similar reasoning to Varnum to decide that prohibitions against same-sex marriage violated the Equal Protection Clause. Writing 10 years after the Varnum ruling, Allan W. Vestal stated that the Iowa Supreme Court had been vindicated in their decision, owing to the nationwide extension in Obergefell, widespread public support for marriage equality, and a lack of controversy in future judicial retention elections.
