= Edward Mansfield (judge) =

American judge (born 1957)

Associate Justice of the Iowa Supreme Court
- Incumbent
- Assumed office February 23, 2011
- Appointed by: Terry Branstad
- Preceded by: Michael Streit

Personal details
- Born: January 12, 1957 (age 68) Massachusetts, U.S.
- Political party: Republican
- Education: Harvard University (BA); Yale University (JD)

Edward M. Mansfield (born January 12, 1957) is an American lawyer who is a justice of the Iowa Supreme Court.

== Education ==
Mansfield grew up in Massachusetts. His mother was a refugee from the Soviet Union. He graduated from Harvard College, magna cum laude and Phi Beta Kappa, in 1978 and Yale Law School in 1982. During law school, Mansfield worked at the Boston office of Sullivan & Worcester and at the Los Angeles office of O'Melveny & Myers. He declined offers from both firms to join them permanently.

== Career ==
After law school Mansfield clerked for Judge Patrick Higginbotham of the United States Court of Appeals for the Fifth Circuit before entering private practice. From 1983 to 1996, he practiced at Lewis Roca Rothgerber Christie in Phoenix, Arizona, where he became a partner in 1988. He then moved to Des Moines for his wife's career and was a litigator at Belin McCormick P.C. from 1996 to 2009. In 1997, Mansfield started teaching as an adjunct professor at Drake University. He has also served as the chairperson of the board of directors of Goodwill Industries of Central Iowa.

== Judicial career ==
=== State court of appeals service ===
Mansfield was appointed by Chet Culver to the Iowa Court of Appeals in 2009.

=== Iowa Supreme Court ===
Mansfield was one of three justices appointed by Governor Terry Branstad in 2011. In November 2010, Iowa voters had removed all three justices seeking reelection in response to the court unanimously legalizing same-sex marriage in Varnum v. Brien.

In 2012, Mansfield authored an opinion for the court which found a dentist did not commit gender discrimination when, at the insistence of his wife, he fired a dental assistant to whom he was sexually attracted. In 2016, Mansfield dissented when the Court found that the Iowa Constitution categorically prohibited life without parole for juveniles who committed first degree murder.

In September 2016, Mansfield was named as a possible nominee for the Supreme Court of the United States by then-presidential candidate Donald Trump.

== See also ==
- Donald Trump Supreme Court candidates

Legal offices
Preceded by Michael Streit	Associate Justice of the Iowa Supreme Court; 2011–present	Incumbent
