= Marsha Ternus =

American judge (born 1951)

Marsha K. Ternus
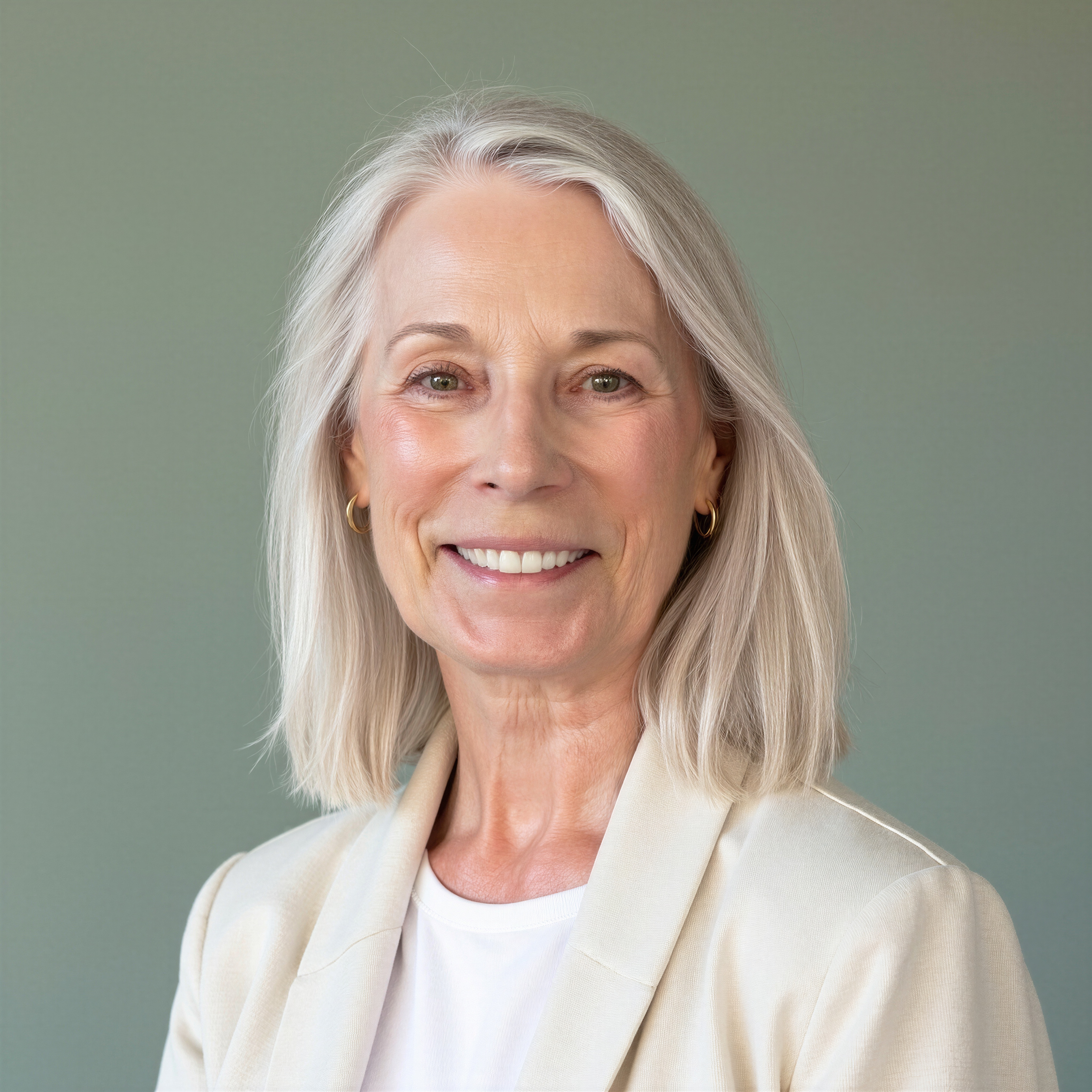

Chief Justice of the Iowa Supreme Court
- In office September 2006 – December 31, 2010
- Preceded by: Louis A. Lavorato
- Succeeded by: Mark Cady

Justice of the Iowa Supreme Court
- In office September 7, 1993 – December 31, 2010
- Appointed by: Terry Branstad
- Preceded by: Louis W. Schultz
- Succeeded by: Thomas D. Waterman

Personal details
- Born: May 30, 1951 (age 75) Vinton, Iowa, U.S.

Marsha K. Ternus (born May 30, 1951) is an American lawyer. She has served on Iowa's Supreme Court as Justice and Chief Justice. She was the first woman to serve as Chief Justice on Iowa's Supreme Court, where she served for four years. Iowa's governor at the time, Terry Branstad, nominated her to the Supreme Court in 1993. Later in 2006, her colleagues would vote her as Chief Justice of the Supreme Court. Voters removed her and two of her colleagues from the court in December 2010, after voting to legalize gay marriage in Iowa. She served from September 7, 1993, to December 31, 2010.

== Early life and education ==
Marsha K. Ternus was born on May 30, 1951. She is an Iowa native and grew up in Benton county. Marsha Ternus graduated from Vinton high school in 1969. She then went to college at the University of Iowa. Ternus graduated from the University of Iowa in 1972 with honors and high distinctions. She continued her education going into Drake University's law school, where she graduated in 1977 with honors and Order of the Coif. During her time at Drake Law School she also served as Editor-in-Chief of Drake Law Review. Since graduating law school she has received multiple honorary degrees.

== Early career ==
After law school Marsha started working in law's private sector within Des Moines IA. She spent 16 years working for a law firm called Bradshaw, Fowler, Proctor and Fairgrave where she focused mainly on civil litigation and insurance law. During her time of private practice she also had positions on the Board of Governors, the Iowa State Bar association, the Iowa Jury Instructions Committee, and the Board of Directors of Polk County Legal Aid Society. She was also the president of the Polk Count Bar Association along with the President of the Board of Counselors at Drake University Law School.

== Path to Iowa Supreme Court ==
She got her first opportunity to serve on the Iowa Supreme Court in 1993, Iowa's governor, Terry Branstad, nominated her. In 2006 other justices voted her to be the Chief Justice of the Supreme Court. She was the first woman to serve as Chief Justice of Iowa's highest court. Throughout her time as chief she helped create roughly 120 decisions. One of those decisions was a ruling on same-sex marriage in Iowa. Voters removed her, along with two of her colleagues, from office in 2010 after a judicial retention election, following campaigning by groups opposed to same-sex marriage. Some of those groups include the Iowans for Freedom (IFF) group and the National Organization for Marriage (NOM).

== Impact on Iowa Law ==
Justice Ternus is most commonly known for her part in legalizing same-sex marriage in Iowa. In Varnum v. Brien (2009) she, along with the other Iowan Supreme Court justices, voted unanimously in a decision to repeal the ban on gay marriage in Iowa. This decision was six years before it was formally legalized in the United States by Obergefell v. Hodges (2015). This decision made Iowa the third state, after Massachusetts and Connecticut, to legalize gay marriage.

She also advocated and participated in reforming Iowa's child welfare. With a main focus being on improving court oversight of child welfare cases, she chaired State Children’s Justice Council. Eventually, in 2007, it started a shift in how juvenile justice dockets were handled within Iowa.

During this time she also helped implement the electronic document system for the Iowa court.

Marsha Ternus, along with two of her colleagues, were removed from office in 2010 after a judicial retention election. This is primarily from campaigns by groups opposed to same-sex marriage. Including, but not limited to, organizations like the Iowans for Freedom (IFF) group and the National Organization for Marriage (NOM).

== Life after office ==
After her removal from office, she rejoined the private sector of law and continued working throughout the Des Moines community. From 2010 to 2012 she served on the Bar Admissions Committee of the ABA. From August 2013 to June 2016, she served as the part-time director of the Harkin Institute for Public Policy. From 2015 to 2022 she also served on the board of directors for the Iowa Public Radio. Throughout that time she served on the Institute’s National Advisory Council until 2024. She chaired a total of seven years at the council.

As of 2026, Marsha Ternus is still working in private sector law in Des Moines, working as an arbitrator and an appellate and trial case consultant.

== Awards ==
Since graduating law school in 1997 she has received honorary degrees from Iowa Wesleyan College in 2005, Simpson College in 2010, Coe College in 2011 and Drake University in 2015.

In 2012, Ternus received a Profile in Courage Award from the John F. Kennedy Library Foundation, along with fellow justices David L. Baker and Michael Streit.

Political offices
Preceded by Louis W. Schultz	Justice of the Iowa Supreme Court; 1993–2010	Succeeded by Thomas D. Waterman
