= David L. Baker =

American judge (born 1952)

David Lee Baker
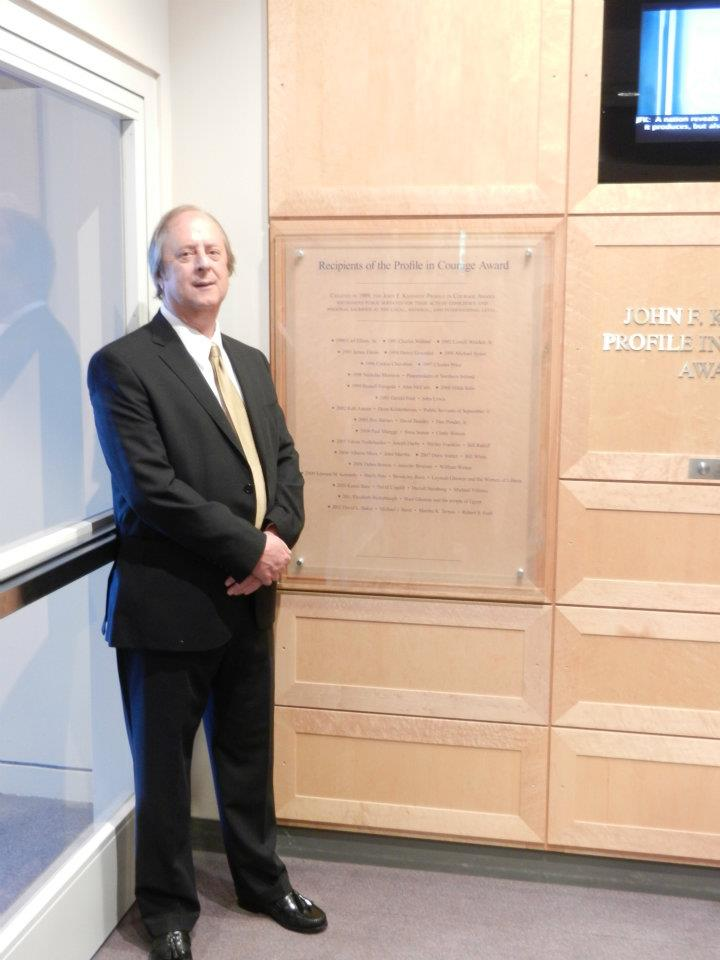
- Baker in 2012 with listing of winners for Kennedy Library Profiles in Courage

Associate Justice of the Iowa Supreme Court
- In office 2008 – December 31, 2010

Personal details
- Born: 1952 (age 73–74) Muscatine, Iowa
- Education: Luther College; University of Iowa
- Occupation: lawyer, judge

David Lee Baker (born 1952) is an American lawyer and judge who served as a justice of the Iowa Supreme Court from 2008 to 2010. Prior to his time in the state's supreme court, he served as a District Court judge for the Sixth Judicial District and on the Iowa Court of Appeals.

== Early life ==
Baker was born in 1952 in Muscatine, Iowa. He attended high school at Waterloo West High School in Waterloo, Iowa, graduating in 1971. He attended Luther College from 1971 to 1973. While attending Luther, Baker was a member of the swim team and the Community Assembly. Baker graduated undergraduate and law school at the University of Iowa, receiving his bachelor's degree in 1975 with Honors in Sociology and his Juris Doctor degree in 1979 with high honors, Order of the Coif.

== Career ==
Following graduation from law school, Baker worked as a lawyer in private practice for twenty-five years. In 2005 Baker was appointed as a District Court Judge for the Sixth Judicial District. He was appointed to the Iowa Court of Appeals in 2006 where he served until his appointment to the Iowa Supreme Court in 2008.

As a Justice, Baker was part of the unanimous Iowa Supreme Court ruling, Varnum v. Brien, legally recognizing same-sex marriage in Iowa, and was removed from office after a judicial retention election, following campaigning by groups opposed to same-sex marriage including the National Organization for Marriage.

In 2011, Baker received The Louise Noun Award, given annually by the ACLU of Iowa to honor people who have contributed significantly to the defense of civil liberties. In 2012, Baker received a Profile in Courage Award from the John F. Kennedy Library Foundation, along with fellow justices Marsha K. Ternus and Michael J. Streit. In his acceptance speech he stated "The three of us up for retention made a deliberate decision not to form campaign committees."

Justice Baker was an Adjunct Faculty Member at Iowa Law until 2019. He was a member of the Iowa Judicial Nominating Commission from 2012 to 2018 and the Cedar Rapids Board of Ethics.

Political offices
Preceded by	Justice of the Iowa Supreme Court; 2008–2010	Succeeded by
