= In re Ralph, a colored man =

Court case in Iowa

- Court: Supreme Court of Iowa (at the time Iowa Territory)
- Full case name: Montgomery v. Ralph
- Decided: June 4, 1839

Court membership
- Judges sitting: Charles Mason; Joseph Williams; Thomas Wilson

In re Ralph, a colored man was the first reported decision in the Supreme Court of the Iowa Territory. A black man from Missouri, Ralph, was allowed to travel to Iowa to work for an attempt to purchase his freedom. When Ralph could not obtain the amount needed, the slave owner sent bounty hunters to return Ralph to Missouri. The opinion denied the slave owner while giving Ralph his freedom.

== Background ==
Iowa had been separated from Wisconsin Territory and became Iowa Territory on June 12, 1838. Under the Missouri Compromise, slavery was illegal in the Iowa Territory but was legal in Missouri. Iowa Territory was provided with a Supreme Court with 3 justices. The Chief Justice was Charles Mason, and the 2 associate justices were Joseph Williams and Thomas Wilson.

In 1834, an enslaved man living in Missouri named Ralph entered a written agreement with William Montgomery. The agreement allowed Ralph to travel to Dubuque to pay back his freedom of $550 plus interest over time. Ralph worked in Dubuque for 5 years but wasn’t able to save up the money to buy his freedom. In 1839, two men from Virginia offered Montgomery $100 to return Ralph back to Missouri. The two men found Ralph and told a nearby sheriff that he was a runaway slave. The sheriff arrested Ralph and sent him on a riverboat headed back to Missouri. As he was getting on the riverboat, a merchant named Alexander Butterworth saw the bounty hunters taking Ralph away and was able to get a habeas corpus from Thomas Wilson.

== Case ==
Montgomery argued that he was entitled for his return of his property under Section 2 Article IV of the Constitution. Because Ralph was a resident of the Wisconsin Territory, and later the Iowa Territory, The Iowa Supreme Court found that Ralph should pay his debt, but he was considered a free man by law. The court rejected the idea that Ralph was a fugitive slave since Ralph was voluntarily given permission by Montgomery to live in Iowa Territory during the time, and according to the Missouri Compromise, slavery and servitude was illegal in the Iowa Territory. On July 4, 1839, Ralph was declared a free man by the Supreme Court.

After the case was dismissed, Ralph worked one day a year for Thomas Wilson as a sign of gratitude. Ralph died in Dubuque in 1870 from smallpox after contracting it from someone he was caring for.
