= Shuttleworth & Ingersoll =

American law firm

Shuttleworth & Ingersoll, P.L.C.
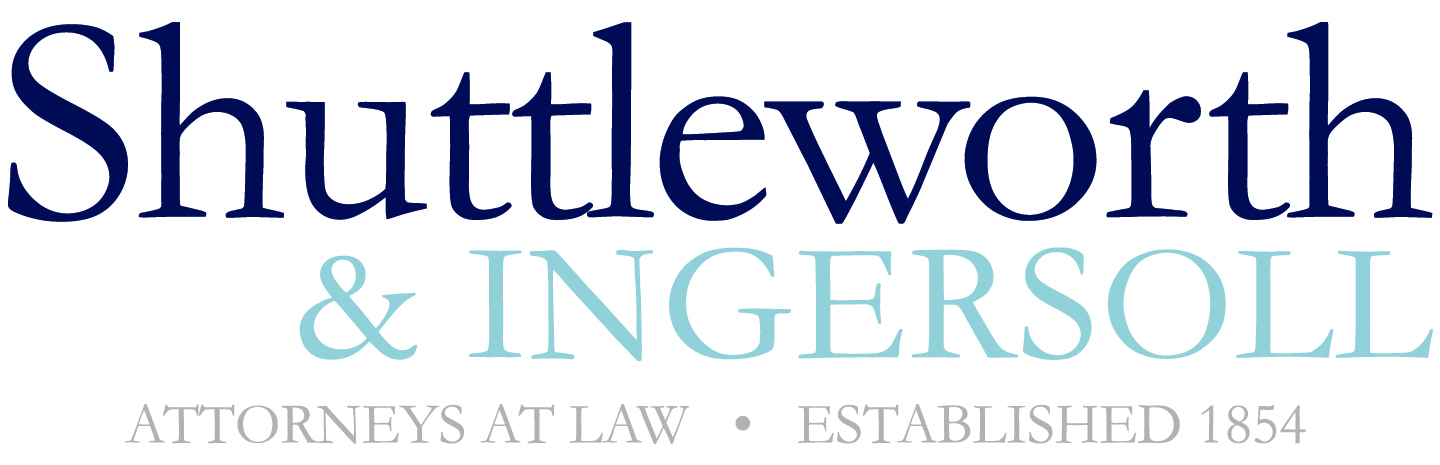
- Headquarters: Cedar Rapids, IA, USA
- Area served: Iowa
- Key people: Brian Bergstrom, President
- Services: Legal
- Revenue: $8.5 million
- Number of employees: 118
- Website: shuttleworthlaw.com

Shuttleworth & Ingersoll P.L.C. is a law firm located in Cedar Rapids, Iowa. It has been called one of the oldest legal firms in the western United States and is considered one of the largest law firms in Iowa. In addition to Cedar Rapids, the firm also has offices in Coralville, Davenport, Waterloo, and Nashua.

== History ==
The company was founded in 1854 by Nathaniel M. Hubbard.

The firm was called Grimm, Wheeler & Elliot beginning in 1911 and later became Grimm, Wheeler, Elliott and Shuttleworth. Grimm, Wheeler and Elliot became Elliot, Shuttleworth and Ingersoll in 1945.

The company became Shuttleworth & Ingersoll in 1983. Six lawyers left a rival firm to join Shuttleworth and Ingersoll in 1998 and the firm became a professional limited liability company in 1999. The company's president is Brian Bergstrom.

=== Partners ===
Early partners included Frank Dawley (1865-1922), Charles Wheeler (1851-1927) and Justice John M. Grimm (1866-1943). Owen N. Elliot (1886-1982) was a member of the firm from 1911 until his retirement in 1958. T.M. (Ty) Ingersoll (1902-1972) and V. Craven Shuttleworth (1900-1964) joined the firm in the 1920s.

Robert O. Daniel (1914-1992) was associated with the firm for 52 years. He remained active in his practice at the firm, until his death in 1992.

== Services ==
The firm provides tax, estate, commercial and litigation services including services to the wind energy industry. These activities are divided into four areas: business, intellectual property, family law and litigation.

== Recognition ==
Thirty attorneys from the firm were selected as part of the Best Lawyers in America 2026 list.

In 2017, the firm was selected as the Corridor's Best Law Firm for 2017.

In 2014 the firm was ranked as one of the best Iowa law firms by U.S. News & World Report.

The firm was awarded the Outstanding Philanthropic Organization by the National Society of Fundraising Executives and received the Edge of Excellence Award for Community Service from Edge Business Magazine in 2006. According to The Gazette in Cedar Rapids the firm's employees "are active with just about every non-profit group in the Corridor."
