= Iowa Senate File 538 =

2023 Iowa law

Senate File 538

Iowa General Assembly
- Long title: An act relating to prohibited activities regarding gender transition procedures relative to minors, and including effective date and applicability provisions.
- Territorial extent: Iowa
- Passed by: Iowa Senate
- Passed: March 7, 2023
- Passed by: Iowa House of Representatives
- Passed: March 8, 2023
- Signed by: Kim Reynolds
- Signed: March 22, 2023
- Effective: March 22, 2023
- Voting summary: 33 voted for; 16 voted against; 1 absent
- Voting summary: 58 voted for; 39 voted against; 3 absent

Summary
- Restricts access to gender-affirming medical care for Iowans under 18 years old.
- Status: In force

Iowa Senate File 538 (S.F. 538) is a 2023 law in the state of Iowa that restricts access to gender-affirming care for Iowans under eighteen years of age, including hormone replacement therapy (HRT) and puberty blockers. It was signed into law by Governor Kim Reynolds on March 22, 2023 and took effect immediately.

The bill passed the Senate by a vote of 33–16 on March 7 and the House of Representatives by a vote of 58–39 on March 8. A major high school student protest took place on March 1 in protest of Senate File 538.

== Provisions ==
Senate File 538 prohibits medical professionals from providing gender-affirming medical care to minors in the state of Iowa. A grandfather clause was included, which allowed Iowan minors already receiving such care to continue receiving it until September 18, 2023. Medical professionals who violate the law can be subject to disciplinary actions or lawsuits.

The bill separately contains language specifying it does not violate the Iowa Civil Rights Act, which drew controversy.

== Reactions ==
=== Support ===
Governor Kim Reynolds did not strongly support Senate Bill 538, but signed it into law. She stated in a press conference that while the bill would harm some Iowans, it was necessary for the safety of children as the long-term effects of such care are unknown. A poll conducted between March 5-8 by Selzer & Co. showed that 52% of Iowans supported such a ban. The main sponsor of the bill, Steven Holt, stated that he did not believe that gender-affirming care for minors had enough evidence to be safe.

=== Opposition ===
Several local organizations and medical professionals opposed Senate File 538, including the Human Rights Campaign and One Iowa Action. Over 60 businesses are known to have opposed Senate File 538. The Iowa Starting Line did not officially take a stance but referred to the bill as "homophobic". The Scarlet & Black, a newspaper connected to Grinnell College, opposed Senate File 538.
