= Drake University Law School =

Law school in Des Moines, Iowa, US

Coordinates: 41.60216°N 93.65306°W

- Parent school: Drake University
- Established: 1865
- Parent endowment: $538.2 million (2022)
- Dean: Jerry Anderson (interim)
- Location: Des Moines, Iowa, U.S.
- Enrollment: 330
- USNWR ranking: 91st (tie) (2026)
- Website: www.drake.edu/law/

Drake University Law School is the law school affiliated with Drake University, located in Des Moines, Iowa, United States. Over 330 full-time students attend the institution. Former dean Jerry Anderson serves as the interim dean of the law school.

Founded in 1865, Drake Law School is one of the 25 oldest law schools in the United States. It was established by Iowa Supreme Court justices George G. Wright and Chester Cole, who aimed to teach law in proximity to the courts so students could witness the law in action.

== History ==
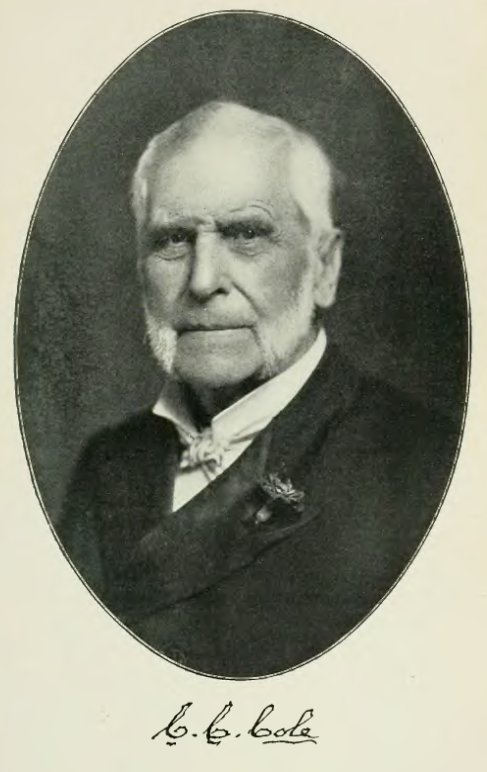
Founder Justice Chester C. Cole

Established in 1865 by Chester C. Cole, a justice of the Iowa Supreme Court, Drake Law School is one of the top 25 oldest law schools in the country and the second law school founded west of the Mississippi River after the University of Iowa, which Justice Cole co-founded with Justice George G. Wright. Justice Cole felt that having a law school located in the state capital would be advantageous. In time, Drake Law alumni would fill the ranks of all branches of Iowa local and state government.

== Programs ==
In addition to the full-scale, three-year, Juris Doctor program, the law school features the following special programs:

- Drake Law Review
- Drake Journal of Agricultural Law
- 5 Research Centers: Agricultural Law, Children's Rights, Constitutional Law, Intellectual Property, and Legislative Practice
- Certificate programs in several fields
- Civil and Criminal Clinical Programs
- Multiple Moot Court and Mock Trial teams
- Summer in France Program
- Summer Institute in Constitutional Law (for entering 1Ls)
- LL.M./M.J. Program in Intellectual Property
- M.J. Program in Health Law
- LL.M./M.J. Program in Individualized Legal Studies (Concentrations in: Business Law, Criminal Law, Estate Planning, Family Counseling and the Law, Human Rights and Global Citizenship, Legislative Practice and Government Relations, Sustainable Development)

== Drake Law Review ==
The Drake Law Review is nationally ranked among the top 40 law journals for the number of times courts have cited its articles. Drake is in the top group of more than 1,640 journals in the rankings.

Renovated in 2013, Cartwright Hall houses classrooms and conference spaces, technology, and the faculty and administration of Drake Law.

The Drake Law Review is published quarterly by Drake Law students. In the past few years, the Drake Law Review has published articles by distinguished legal scholars and judges, including: Erwin Chemerinsky, Cass Sunstein, Randy Barnett, Cheryl Harris, Paul Brest, Stephen Carter, Michael Gerhardt, Chief Justice John G. Roberts Jr., and Stephen Rapp (Chief Prosecutor of the United Nations Special Court for Sierra Leone).

== Notable alumni ==
Drake Law has graduated numerous lawyers, including several state or federal judges and politicians, including:

- Sean Bagniewski, member of the Iowa House of Representatives
- Turner W. Bell, pioneering black criminal defense attorney
- Mark W. Bennett, former federal judge for the Northern District of Iowa
- Robert D. Blue, former governor of Iowa
- Terry Branstad, former and longest-serving governor of Iowa, former U.S. Ambassador to China
- Mark Cady, former chief justice of the Iowa Supreme Court
- Russell C. Davis, United States Air Force lieutenant general
- George Gardner Fagg, United States federal judge on the United States Court of Appeals for the Eighth Circuit

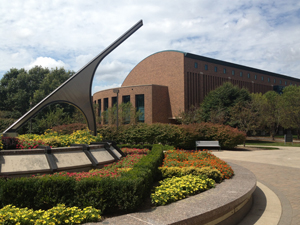
Opperman Hall, which houses the Drake University Law School Library

- Adam Gregg, former Iowa lieutenant governor
- James E. Gritzner, federal judge for the Southern District of Iowa since 2002
- Robert Helmick, president of the United States Olympic Committee
- John Alfred Jarvey, former federal judge for the Southern District of Iowa from 2007 to 2022
- Daniel Jay, former member of the Iowa House of Representatives
- Gary Lambert (politician), former New Hampshire state senator
- Louis A. Lavorato, former chief justice of the Iowa Supreme Court
- Dustin Manwaring, member of the Idaho House of Representatives
- Brian Meyer, member of the Iowa House of Representatives
- C. Edwin Moore, former chief justice of the Iowa Supreme Court
- Jim Nussle, former member of the U.S. House of Representatives and Director of the Office of Management and Budget
- Dwight D. Opperman, former CEO of West Publishing Company
- James W. Porter, chief justice of the Idaho Supreme Court
- Robert D. Ray, former governor of Iowa
- Ione Genevieve Shadduck, educator, women's rights activist, and attorney
- Neal Smith, former member of the U.S. House of Representatives
- Marsha Ternus, former chief justice of the Iowa Supreme Court
- Jack Whitver, current Iowa state senator and Senate Majority Leader
- David Wiggins, former justice of the Iowa Supreme Court
- Johnny C. Taylor, Jr., President and CEO of the Society for Human Resources Management (SHRM)

== Employment ==
According to Drake's official ABA-required disclosures, 94-95% of the classes of 2022, 2023, and 2024 obtained full-time, long-term, bar passage required jobs 10 months after graduation.

== Costs ==
The total cost of attendance (indicating the cost of tuition, fees, and living expenses) at Drake for the 2024-2025 academic year is $68,974. Drake Law School offers both guaranteed and conditional scholarships, that latter of which depend upon the student maintaining a specific grade point average, rather than remaining in good academic standing.
