= Varnum v. Brien =

Iowa Supreme Court Case, same-sex marriage (2009)

- Court: Iowa Supreme Court
- Full case name: Katherine Varnum, Patricia Hyde, Dawn Barbouroske, Jennifer Barbouroske, Jason Morgan, Charles Swaggerty, David Twombley, Lawrence Hoch, William M. Musser, Otter Dreaming, Ingrid Olson, and Reva Evans vs. Timothy J. Brien,, In His Official Capacities as the Polk County Recorder and Polk County Registrar
- Decided: April 3, 2009
- Citation: 763 N.W.2d 862 (Iowa 2009)

Case history
- Prior actions: Judgment for plaintiffs, Polk County District Court

Court membership
- Chief judge: Marsha Ternus
- Associate judges: Mark Cady, Michael Streit, David Wiggins, Daryl Hecht, Brent R. Appel, and David L. Baker

Case opinions
- Majority: Cady, joined by unanimous

Varnum v. Brien, 763 N.W.2d 862 (Iowa 2009), was a landmark Iowa Supreme Court case in which the Court unanimously held that the state's limitation of marriage to opposite-sex couples violated the equal protection clause of the Iowa Constitution. The case had the effect of legally recognizing same-sex marriage in Iowa. In 2007, a lower court had granted summary judgment in favor of six same-sex couples who sued Timothy Brien, Polk County Recorder, for refusing to grant them marriage licenses.

In 2010, Iowa voters defeated the retention of three of the judges responsible for the decision. However, in 2012, voters retained the one judge who participated in the decision and whose term would otherwise have ended, following various polls showing that a majority of Iowans support same-sex marriage.

== Issue ==
Six same-sex couples went to the Office of the Polk County Recorder in Des Moines, Iowa, at various times between November 2005 and January 2006 in an attempt to apply for marriage licenses. Each couple's application was denied because in each case the couple was composed of two people of the same sex, and Iowa law only permitted couples composed of one man and one woman to marry. The couples filed suit in Polk County District Court, arguing that this law violated certain rights guaranteed by the Iowa constitution.

== District Court ruling ==
Judge Robert Hanson of Polk County District Court ruled in favor of the plaintiffs on August 30, 2007. He ruled that the marriage statute was unconstitutional, and that the Polk County Recorder was required to issue marriage licenses to same-sex couples who otherwise meet the requirements for marriage. Hanson's ruling states, in part, that:

Couples, such as plaintiffs, who are otherwise qualified to marry one another may not be denied licenses to marry or certificates of marriage or in any other way prevented from entering into a civil marriage... by reason of the fact that both persons comprising such a couple are of the same sex.

Judge Hanson issued a stay of his ruling on August 31, 2007, in anticipation of an appeal to the Iowa Supreme Court. One same-sex couple was able to obtain a marriage license in the brief time between Hanson's ruling and the stay.

== Iowa Supreme Court ruling ==
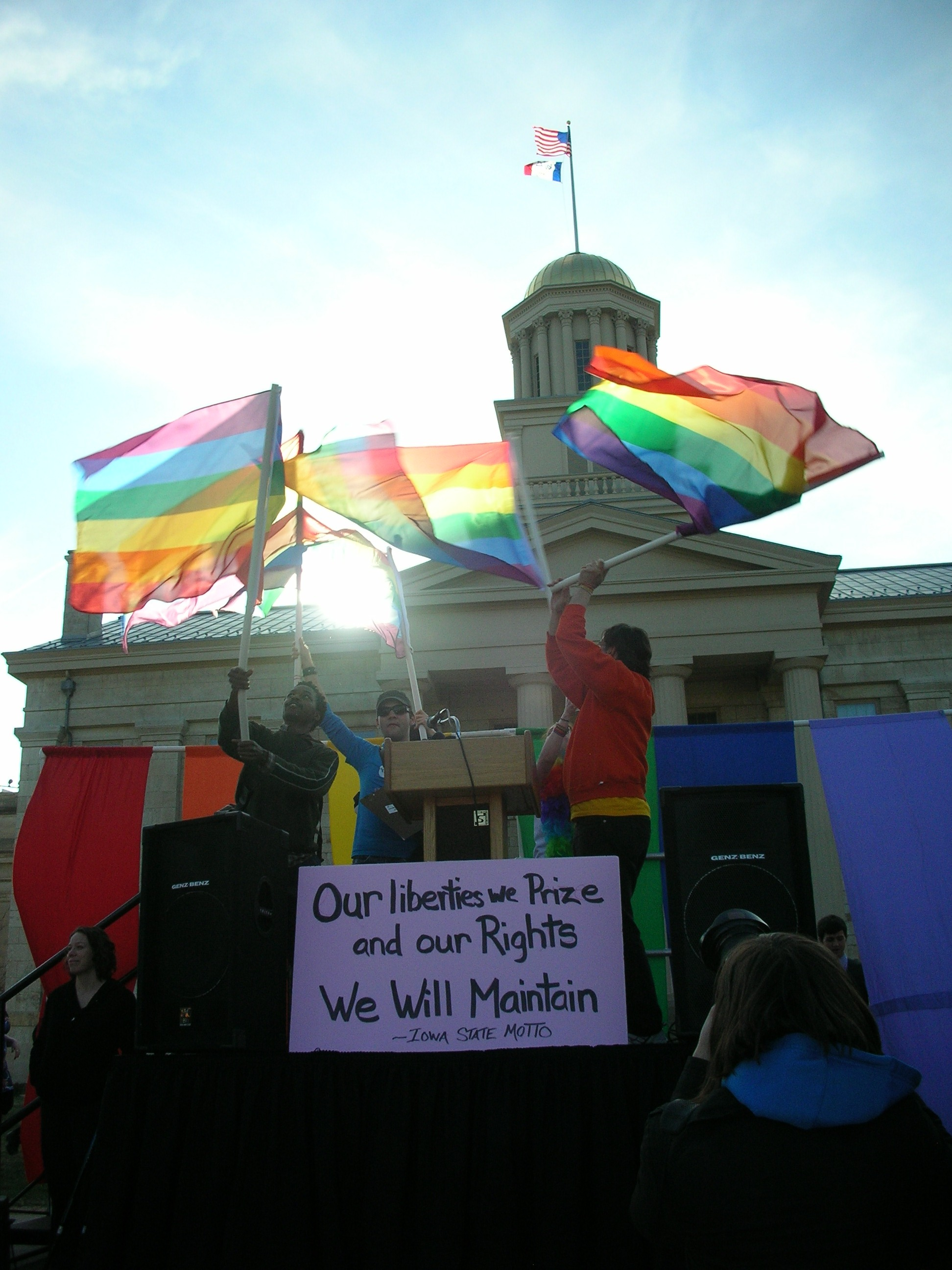
A rally held in Iowa City following Varnum v. Brien. The purple placecard in the center shows Iowa's state motto.

Polk County appealed Hanson's ruling to the Iowa Supreme Court, which heard oral arguments on December 9, 2008. There were 24 amicus curiae briefs filed with the court. In a unanimous opinion authored by Justice Mark S. Cady, the Court affirmed Hanson's decision on April 3, 2009.

The Supreme Court initially stated its duty to protect the right of individuals:

Our responsibility, however, is to protect constitutional rights of individuals from legislative enactments that have denied those rights, even when the rights have not yet been broadly accepted, were at one time unimagined, or challenge a deeply ingrained practice or law viewed to be impervious to the passage of time.

The Court noted that Iowa has a long history of progressive thought on civil rights. Seventeen years before the Dred Scott decision, the Iowa Supreme Court "refused to treat a human being as property to enforce a contract for slavery and held our laws must extend equal protection to persons of all races and conditions." Eighty-six years before "separate but equal" was struck down by the U.S. Supreme Court in Brown v. Board of Education, the Iowa Supreme Court ruled such practices unconstitutional in Iowa. In 1869, Iowa was the first state in the union to admit women to the bar and allow them to practice law. Three years later the U.S. Supreme Court affirmed the State of Illinois's decision to deny women admission to the bar.

The Court stated that the equal protection clause of the Iowa Constitution requires that laws treat alike all those who are similarly situated with respect to the purposes of the law, and concluded that homosexual persons are similarly situated compared to heterosexual persons for purposes of Iowa's marriage laws. The Court applied the standard of review known as intermediate scrutiny to assess the government's objectives as described by the county: maintaining traditional marriage, promotion of an optimal environment to raise children, promotion of procreation, promotion of stability in opposite-sex relationships and conservation of resources. The Court concluded that:

We are firmly convinced the exclusion of gay and lesbian people from the institution of civil marriage does not substantially further any important governmental objective. The legislature has excluded a historically disfavored class of persons from a supremely important civil institution without a constitutionally sufficient justification. There is no material fact, genuinely in dispute, that can affect this determination.

But the court noted the national development of gay rights in both Lawrence v. Texas and Romer v. Evans, and it cited discussion in these cases as evidence of a history of discrimination against gays and lesbians. Because plaintiffs brought a state constitutional claim, the state Supreme Court was not constrained by federal precedents, and the decision was not subject to review by a federal court.

On April 27, 2009, the Iowa Supreme Court issued a procedendo directing the Iowa District Court for the County of Polk to "proceed in the manner required by law and consistent with the opinion of the court." The court's decision became effective with the issuance of the procedendo.

== Reaction ==
In a joint press release on April 3, Iowa House Speaker Pat Murphy and Senate Majority Leader Mike Gronstal welcomed the court's decision, saying "When all is said and done, we believe the only lasting question about today's events will be why it took us so long. It is a tough question to answer because treating everyone fairly is really a matter of Iowa common sense and Iowa common decency. Iowa has always been a leader in the area of civil rights." Iowa State Senator Matt McCoy, who is openly gay, welcomed the decision, calling it "a red letter day for the state of Iowa."

The state Senate Republican leader, Paul McKinley, expressed disappointment and called for a constitutional amendment that "protects traditional marriage." Iowa Governor Chet Culver stated that he was "reluctant to support amending the Iowa Constitution to add a provision that our Supreme Court has said is unlawful and discriminatory." (Note: There are two ways to amend the Iowa constitution. One way is for an amendment to pass the legislature in two successive sessions, then be approved by a popular vote. The other is for a popular vote to convene a constitutional convention and then have any amendments approved by a popular vote. The people of Iowa are given the option of forming a constitutional convention every ten years in Iowa. Elizabeth Ahlin (April 8, 2009). "Culver won't back same-sex marriage ban". Omaha World-Herald.)

Critics contended that court rulings that grant same-sex couples the right to marry overstep the constitutional authority of the judicial branch, that such decisions should be left to more representative processes such as legislation and ballot-initiatives. Others contended that equal treatment under the law and due process with respect to denying same-sex couples the right to marry unequivocally deserved a response from the court. In declaring the DOMA statute an unconstitutional violation the Iowa's equal protection clause, the court referred to the constitutional provision declaring such statutes "void."

Following the decision, groups opposed to same-sex marriage organized a campaign against Chief Justice Marsha Ternus, Justice David L. Baker, and Justice Michael Streit in their subsequent retention election, "with heavy support from out-of-state conservative and religious groups." All three were dismissed by Iowa voters on November 2, 2010, marking the first time an Iowa Supreme Court justice was not retained since the retention system was adopted for Iowa justices in 1962. In 2012, the three of them received Profile In Courage Awards from the John F. Kennedy Library Foundation. In presenting the award, Caroline Kennedy said:

The three judges are interesting and courageous on many levels, ... Like many of the people who get this award, they don't consider that they are doing anything particularly courageous, they just feel they're doing what's right, they're doing their job.

In the November 6, 2012, election, voters retained Justice David Wiggins, the one judge who participated in Varnum whose retention was on the ballot, by a 54% to 46% margin.

== See also ==
- Same-sex marriage in the United States
- LGBT rights in Iowa
- Baker v. Vermont, 744 A.2d 864 (Vt. 1999)
- Goodridge v. Dept. of Public Health, 798 N.E.2d 941 (Mass. 2003)
- Lewis v. Harris, 188 N.J. 415 (N.J. 2006)
- Kerrigan v. Commissioner of Public Health, 289 Conn. 135 (2008)
- In re Marriage Cases, 43 Cal.4th 757 (2008)
