= Constitution of Iowa =

American state constitution

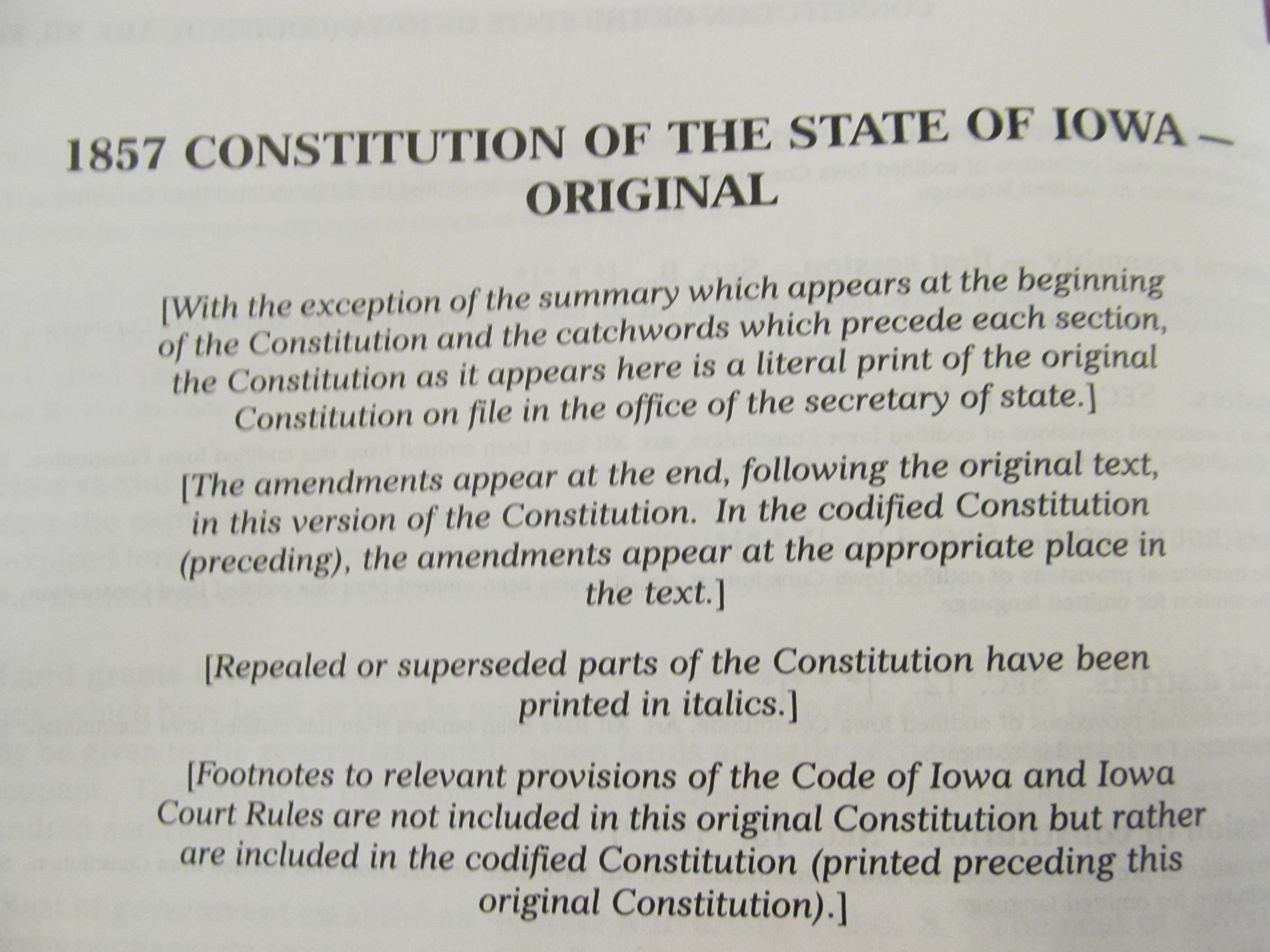

The Constitution of Iowa is the highest body of state law in the U.S. state of Iowa. It establishes the structure and function of the state. Iowa's constitution is subordinate only to the U.S. Constitution and federal law.

The state's first constitution was created in 1844, but not ratified. The second constitution was created in 1846. The present-day document, which went into effect in 1857, is the state's third constitution. All 3 constitutions had conventions. It supersedes Iowa's 1846 constitution and has had numerous amendments since its initial adoption.

== See also ==
- Iowa Supreme Court
- Iowa Code
- State constitutions in the United States
