= Iowa District Courts =

State trial courts of general jurisdiction in the U.S. state of Iowa

Iowa District Courts are the state trial courts of general jurisdiction in the U.S. state of Iowa.

They have original jurisdiction in civil cases with any amount in controversy; felony criminal cases, domestic relations, family law, and cases involving minors cases (including adoption, dependency, juvenile delinquency, and probate cases).

== Judicial personnel and structure ==
Judicial magistrates primarily serve their home county and have jurisdiction over simple misdemeanors, local infractions, and small claims. They have authority to order warrants, conduct preliminary hearings, and hear other simple issues. Most magistrates are attorneys, though it is not mandated by law. They serve four-year terms and are appointed by county commissions.

Associate juvenile judges only have jurisdiction over juvenile court matters. They are able to issue orders, make findings, and official decisions in juvenile cases, juvenile delinquency cases, adoption, and parental rights issues. They serve six-year terms, and are appointed by district judges for the judicial district after being selected by a county commission.

Associate probate judges have limited jurisdiction to probate cases. They are able to audit accounts, and perform other duties as ordered by the chief judge over the course of their six-year terms. They are appointed by the district court judge after having been selected by a county commission.

District associate judges have the same jurisdiction as judicial magistrates, with additional authority to hear more serious misdemeanors, civil suits up to $10,000, and certain juvenile cases. District associate judges are appointed by the district judge after having been selected by a county commission for a six-year term.

District judges have the authority to hear any case within the district. Felony criminal cases, adoptions, state administration issues, and many other matters come before these judges. These judges are appointed by the governor, from a list of nominees from a state nominating commission. The term for a district judge is six years.

Each county has a clerk of the district court who manages and maintains all trial records in the county.

Court attendants facilitate court proceedings, and aid with clerical work.

Court reporters transcribe all official statements in the courtroom, making the court record.

Juvenile court officers work with youth who are accused of delinquent acts, to oversee the treatment and restitution of the young person in question.

== Regions of jurisdiction ==
There are 8 judicial districts, each encompassing five or more of Iowa's 99 counties.

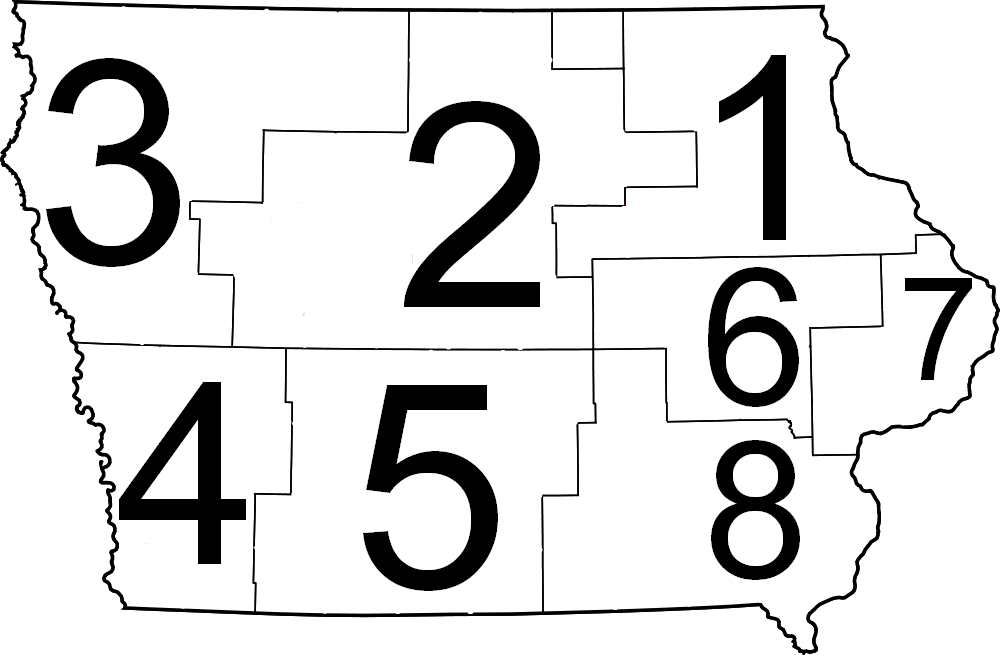
No county lines are crossed by the state judicial districts, accounting for irregular shapes and sizes

- 1st Judicial District - Allamakee County, Iowa; Black Hawk County, Iowa; Buchanan County, Iowa; Chickasaw County, Iowa; Clayton County, Iowa; Delaware County, Iowa; Dubuque County, Iowa; Fayette County, Iowa; Grundy County, Iowa; Howard County, Iowa; Winneshiek County, Iowa

Chief Judge: David P. Odekirk

- 2nd Judicial District - Boone County, Iowa; Bremer County, Iowa; Butler County, Iowa; Calhoun County, Iowa; Carroll County, Iowa; Cerro Gordo County, Iowa; Floyd County, Iowa; Franklin County, Iowa; Greene County, Iowa; Hamilton County, Iowa; Hancock County, Iowa; Hardin County, Iowa; Humboldt County, Iowa; Marshall County, Iowa; Mitchell County, Iowa; Pocahontas County, Iowa; Sac County, Iowa; Story County, Iowa; Webster County, Iowa; Winnebago County, Iowa; Worth County, Iowa; Wright County, Iowa

Chief Judge: Amy Moore

- 3rd Judicial District - Buena Vista County, Iowa; Cherokee County, Iowa; Clay County, Iowa; Crawford County, Iowa; Dickinson County, Iowa; Emmet County, Iowa; Ida County, Iowa; Lyon County, Iowa; Kossuth County, Iowa; Monona County, Iowa; O'Brien County, Iowa; Osceola County, Iowa; Palo Alto County, Iowa; Plymouth County, Iowa; Sioux County, Iowa; Woodbury County, Iowa

Chief Judge: Patrick H. Tott

- 4th Judicial District - Audubon County, Iowa; Cass County, Iowa; Fremont County, Iowa; Harrison County, Iowa; Mills County, Iowa; Montgomery County, Iowa; Page County, Iowa; Pottawattamie County, Iowa; Shelby County, Iowa

Chief Judge: Craig M. Dreismeier

- 5th Judicial District - Adair County, Iowa; Adams County, Iowa; Clarke County, Iowa; Dallas County, Iowa; Decatur County, Iowa; Guthrie County, Iowa; Jasper County, Iowa; Lucas County, Iowa; Madison County, Iowa; Marion County, Iowa; Polk County, Iowa; Ringgold County, Iowa; Taylor County, Iowa; Union County, Iowa; Warren County, Iowa; Wayne County, Iowa

Chief Judge: David M. Porter

- 6th Judicial District - Benton County, Iowa; Iowa County, Iowa; Johnson County, Iowa; Jones County, Iowa; Linn County, Iowa; Tama County, Iowa

Chief Judge: Lars G. Anderson

- 7th Judicial District - Cedar County, Iowa; Clinton County, Iowa; Jackson County, Iowa; Muscatine County, Iowa; Scott County, Iowa

Chief Judge: Henry W. Latham

- 8th Judicial District - Appanoose County, Iowa; Davis County, Iowa; Des Moines County, Iowa; Henry County, Iowa; Jefferson County, Iowa; Keokuk County, Iowa; Lee County, Iowa; Louisa County, Iowa; Mahaska County, Iowa; Monroe County, Iowa; Poweshiek County, Iowa; Van Buren County, Iowa; Wapello County, Iowa; Washington County, Iowa

Chief Judge: Shawn R. Showers

== Iowa Business Specialty Court ==
In December 2012, the Iowa Supreme Court created a specialized business court track pilot program, the Iowa Business Specialty Court. After annual studies and reporting, in 2016, the Supreme Court made the pilot program permanent. The judges appointed to the business court are qualified Iowa District Court judges.

The Business Specialty Court has limited specialized jurisdiction, where a case must be worth over $200,000 or primarily involve equitable or declaratory relief; and the subject matter includes, among other things, technology and biotechnology disputes, internal business disputes, commercial contract claims, shareholder derivative actions, trade secrets, and other specified litigation that is business or commercial in nature. Cases may be included by the parties' joint consent or by the motion of a party to the chief judge of the district court.

Seventh Judicial District Judge John Telleen was one of the three judges originally appointed to the Iowa Business Specialty Court Pilot Project in 2013, and remains one of the judges on the permanent court (as of May 2024). He is a Director of the American College of Business Court Judges.

== See also ==
- Outline of Iowa
- Index of Iowa-related articles

State government

- List of governors of Iowa
  - List of lieutenant governors of Iowa
- Iowa General Assembly
  - Iowa Senate
  - Iowa House of Representatives
- Courts of Iowa

Federal government

- Iowa's congressional delegations
  - List of United States senators from Iowa
  - List of United States representatives from Iowa
    - Iowa's congressional districts
