= Iowa State Bar Association =

Professoral association of lawyers

- Type: Legal Society
- Headquarters: Des Moines, IA
- Location: United States
- Members: 8,000
- Website: http://www.iowabar.org/

The Iowa State Bar Association is a voluntary bar association for the state of Iowa.

== History ==
In May 1874, Iowa lawyers met at the Polk County courthouse to organize The Iowa State Bar Association; it is the oldest voluntary state bar association in the United States.

== Organization ==
The Association's overall governance by a 43-member Board of Governors, elected from the state’s fourteen judicial election districts. A President, President-Elect and Vice-President, are nominated by the Board and elected by the membership.

== Functions ==
Prior to 1995, the Association policed the Bar for ethical rules violations and non-lawyers engaged in the unauthorized practice of law. In 1995, both of those functions were ceded to the Iowa Supreme Court.

The Association currently provides a broad array of services to its membership and the public.

== See also ==
- Official Website
