= Mark Cady =

American judge (1953–2019)

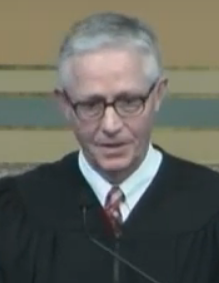
- Cady in 2015

Chief Justice of the Iowa Supreme Court
- In office January 11, 2011 – November 15, 2019
- Preceded by: Marsha Ternus
- Succeeded by: David Wiggins (Acting)

Associate Justice of the Iowa Supreme Court
- In office 1998 – November 15, 2019
- Appointed by: Terry Branstad

Personal details
- Born: July 12, 1953 Rapid City, South Dakota, U.S.
- Died: November 15, 2019 (aged 66) Des Moines, Iowa, U.S.
- Political party: Independent
- Education: Drake University (BA, JD)

Mark Steven Cady (July 12, 1953 – November 15, 2019) was an American jurist. He served on the Iowa Supreme Court for 21 years from 1998 to 2019. From 2011 to 2019, he was the chief justice of the court. He was the author of the court's opinion in Varnum v. Brien, which legalized same-sex marriage in Iowa.

== Early life and career ==
Mark Steven Cady was born on July 12, 1953, in Rapid City, South Dakota. His parents were Kenneth and Suzanne Cady. He graduated from Austin High School in Austin, Minnesota, in 1971. He graduated from Drake University in 1975 with a degree in economics. In 1978, he earned his Juris Doctor degree from Drake and was elected to the Order of the Coif.

== Judicial career ==
Cady began his legal career in Fort Dodge, Iowa, where he practiced law for five years, including one year as a law clerk and one year as an assistant Webster County attorney. In 1983, Cady was appointed as an Iowa District Associate Judge, and in 1986, he was appointed to be an Iowa District Judge. In 1994, Governor Terry Branstad appointed him to the Iowa Court of Appeals. In 1997, Cady became the youngest chief judge in the history of the Court of Appeals. In 1998, Branstad elevated Cady to the Iowa Supreme Court. In 2010, Cady was made interim chief justice, and in 2011, he was elected to a full term as chief justice Cady was retained in the 2017 retention elections. On the Court of Appeals and the Supreme Court, Cady continued to live in Fort Dodge.

As a justice, he wrote the opinion in Varnum v. Brien, a unanimous decision in 2009 that made Iowa the third state to permit same-sex marriage. In 2018, he wrote the 5–2 majority opinion in Planned Parenthood v Reynolds that struck down a 72-hour waiting period for an abortion. Cady also established the Iowa Access to Justice Commission, served as president of the national Conference of Chief Justices, and chaired the Board of Directors of the National Center for State Courts. Cady also taught at Buena Vista University from 1980 until his death.

== Other activities ==
He served as the chairman of the National Center for State Courts Board of Directors. He was also the president of the Conference of Chief Justices. He was an adjunct faculty member at Buena Vista University.

== Personal life ==
Cady was married to Rebecca Cady on May 22, 1982, in Des Moines, Iowa, and the couple had two children.

He died unexpectedly on November 15, 2019, after suffering a heart attack while walking his dog. He was 66 years old. Drake University and the Iowa State Bar Association created the Cady Day of Public Service in his memory. Drake University also created a Cady Law Opportunity Fellow Program for law students from underrepresented backgrounds.

Legal offices
Preceded by Marsha Ternus	Chief Justice of the Iowa Supreme Court; 2011–2019	Succeeded by David Wiggins; Acting
