= Iowa Supreme Court =

Highest court in the U.S. state of Iowa

Coordinates: 41.588273°N 93.601193°W

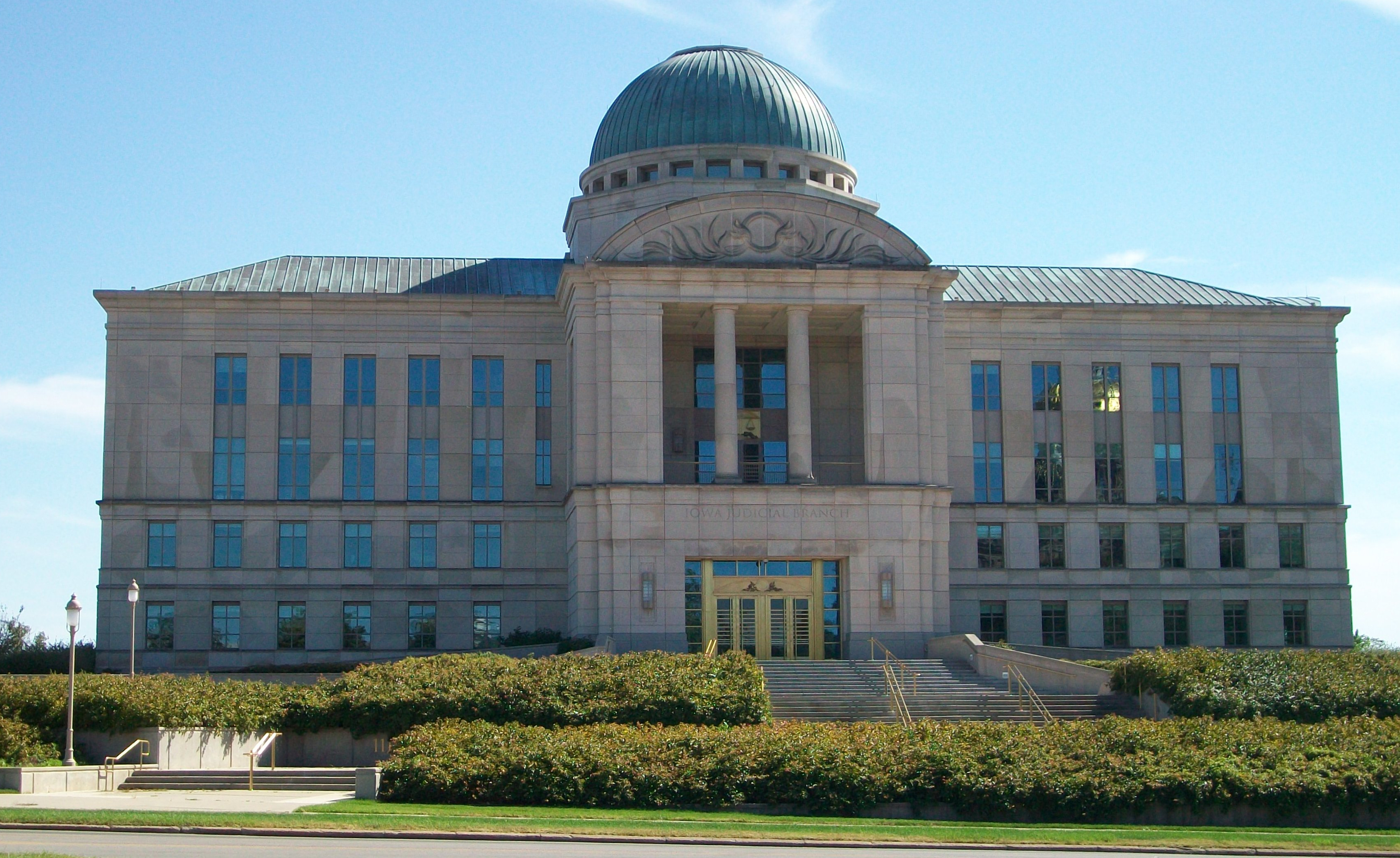
- Iowa Judicial Branch Building
- Interactive map of Iowa Supreme Court
- Established: 1846
- Jurisdiction: Iowa, United States
- Location: Des Moines, Iowa
- Composition method: Missouri Plan
- Authorized by: Iowa Constitution
- Appeals to: Supreme Court of the United States (for matters involving federal law or the U.S. Constitution only)
- Judge term length: 8 years
- Number of positions: 7
- Website: Official website

Chief Justice
- Currently: Susan Christensen
- Since: February 24, 2020

The Iowa Supreme Court is the highest court in the U.S. state of Iowa. The Court is composed of a chief justice and six associate justices.

The Court holds its regular sessions in Des Moines in the Iowa Judicial Branch Building located at 1111 East Court Avenue on the state Capitol grounds, south of the Iowa State Capitol.

== History ==
In 1846, Iowa became the 29th state to join the United States. Following the constitution of the Federal government, the powers of the government in Iowa were divided into the legislative branch, the executive branch, and the judicial branch. The Iowa General Assembly divided the state into four judicial districts, and Supreme Court justices were to serve six year terms, while district judges were elected for five year terms. The Constitution of Iowa of 1857 increased the number of judicial districts to 11, and allowed the General Assembly to reorganize districts after 1860 and every four years thereafter.

== Functions ==
The Supreme Court of Iowa is an appellate court. An appellate court reviews decisions of trial courts in which appeals have been allowed. An appellate court does not preside over trials. Appellate court hearings do not involve witnesses, juries, new evidence, or court reporters. Instead, an appellate court reviews the written record of the trial court to determine whether any significant legal errors occurred

The seven-member Supreme Court of Iowa has many important responsibilities.

- The Court is the "court of last resort" or the highest court in the Iowa state court system. Its opinions are binding on all other Iowa state courts.
- The Iowa Supreme Court has the sole power to admit persons to practice as attorneys in the courts of Iowa, to prescribe rules to supervise attorney conduct, and to discipline attorneys.
- The Court is responsible for promulgating rules of procedure and practice used throughout the state courts.
- The Supreme Court has supervisory and administrative control over the judicial branch and over all judicial officers and court employees.

== Justices ==
Justices are appointed by the governor from a list of nominees submitted by the State Judicial Nominating Commission. A justice serves an initial term consisting of one year plus whatever time remains until the January 1st following the next judicial retention election after the expiration of the one year period. The regular term of office of justices retained at election is eight years. A justice must retire upon reaching the age of 78. The justices elect the chief justice. Terms end on December 31 of the year listed.

Name	Born	Start	Term ends	Mandatory retirement	Appointer	Law school
Susan Christensen, Chief Justice	April 27, 1962 (age 64)	September 21, 2018 (Note: Became Chief Justice on February 24, 2020.)	2028	2040	Kim Reynolds (R)	Creighton
Edward Mansfield	January 12, 1957 (age 69)	February 23, 2011	2028	2035	Terry Branstad (R)	Yale
Thomas D. Waterman	1959 (age 66–67)	February 23, 2011	2028	2037	Terry Branstad (R)	Iowa
Christopher McDonald	September 17, 1974 (age 52)	February 20, 2019	2028	2052	Kim Reynolds (R)	Iowa
Dana Oxley	December 27, 1967 (age 58)	January 29, 2020	2030	2045	Kim Reynolds (R)	Iowa
Matthew McDermott	November 22, 1977 (age 48)	April 3, 2020	2030	2055	Kim Reynolds (R)	UC Berkeley
David N. May	May 23, 1971 (age 55)	July 27, 2022	2032	2049	Kim Reynolds (R)	Drake

== Notable decisions ==
=== In re Ralph, a colored man ===
In re Ralph, a colored man, July 4, 1839 was the first reported decision in the Supreme Court of the Territory of Iowa, a federal court with jurisdiction similar to that the Iowa Supreme Court would eventually hold when Iowa achieved statehood. It was decided twenty six years before the 13th Amendment, eighteen years before Dred Scott, and seven years before Iowa was granted statehood. A black man from Missouri, Ralph, was allowed to travel to Iowa to work, in an attempt to purchase his freedom. When Ralph could not obtain the amount needed, the slave owner sent bounty hunters to return Ralph to Missouri. The opinion denied the slave owner while giving Ralph his freedom, expounding that the law "extend[s] equal protection to men of all colors and conditions".

=== Clark v. The Board of Directors ===
In 1868, the Iowa Supreme Court decided Clark v. Board of School Directors, ruling that racially segregated "separate but equal" schools had no place in Iowa, 86 years before the U.S. Supreme Court reached the same decision.

=== Arabella Mansfield ===
In 1869, Iowa became the first state in the union to admit women to the practice of law, with the Court ruling that women may not be denied the right to practice law in Iowa and admitting Arabella Mansfield to the practice of law.

=== Coger v. The North Western Union Packet Co. ===
The Court heard Coger v. The North Western Union Packet Co. in 1873, ruling against racial discrimination in public accommodations 91 years before the U.S. Supreme Court reached the same decision.

=== Varnum v. Brien ===
On April 3, 2009, in Varnum v. Brien, the Iowa Supreme Court unanimously struck down a statutory same-sex marriage ban as unconstitutional, joining the highest judicial bodies of Massachusetts, Connecticut, California, and Hawaii as the fifth court to rule for the right of same-sex marriage under the state constitution. At the next judicial retention election in 2010, voters removed all three justices facing a retention vote. It was the first time any Iowa Supreme Court justice had been removed by voters. Chief Justice Marsha Ternus, Justice Michael Streit, and Justice David L. Baker each received support from 45% or less of voters.

=== Nelson v. Knight ===
Marissa Nelson, a dental assistant, filed suit against her former employer Dr. James Knight, who terminated her employment at the insistence of his wife. Nelson had previously been texting Knight about personal matters outside work. On December 21, 2012, the court issued a 7-0 decision siding with Knight. The opinion, authored by Edward Mansfield, held that the termination of Nelson's employment did not constitute unlawful sex discrimination.

=== Planned Parenthood v. Reynolds (2018) ===
The Court heard arguments in a lawsuit brought against the state of Iowa and the Iowa Board of Medicine by Planned Parenthood and Dr. Jill Meadows regarding a 72-hour waiting period to receive an abortion enacted by the state legislature and signed into law by Governor Terry Branstad in 2017. The Court decided in a 5-2 majority opinion, authored by Chief Justice Mark Cady, that the waiting period violated the due process and equal protection clauses of the Iowa Constitution because its restrictions "are not narrowly tailored to serve a compelling interest of the state." Justice Cady argued that the state can inform women about abortion, including providing information about adoption, but that a 72-hour waiting period does not serve this interest sufficiently narrowly and imposes an undue burden on Iowan women.

=== Planned Parenthood v. Reynolds (2022) ===
In June 2022, the Court, in a 5–2 vote, found that the Iowa Constitution did not protect a right to an abortion, overruling its 2018 decision. The Court upheld a law establishing a 24-hour waiting period.

== See also ==
- Courts of Iowa
