= List of justices of the Iowa Supreme Court =

Following is a list of justices of the Iowa Supreme Court.

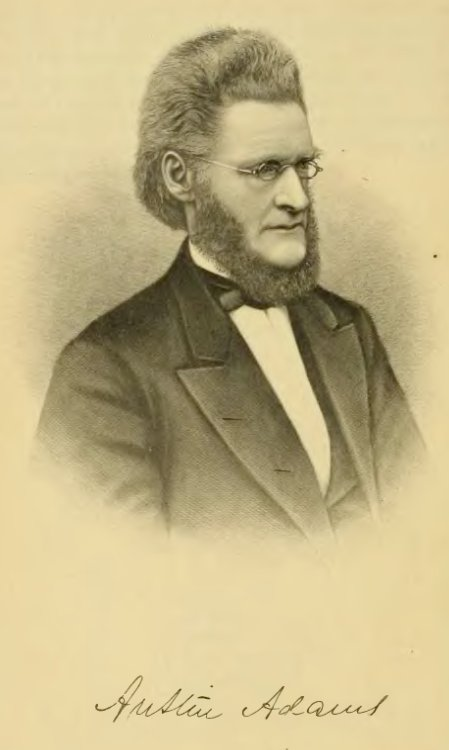
Austin Adams

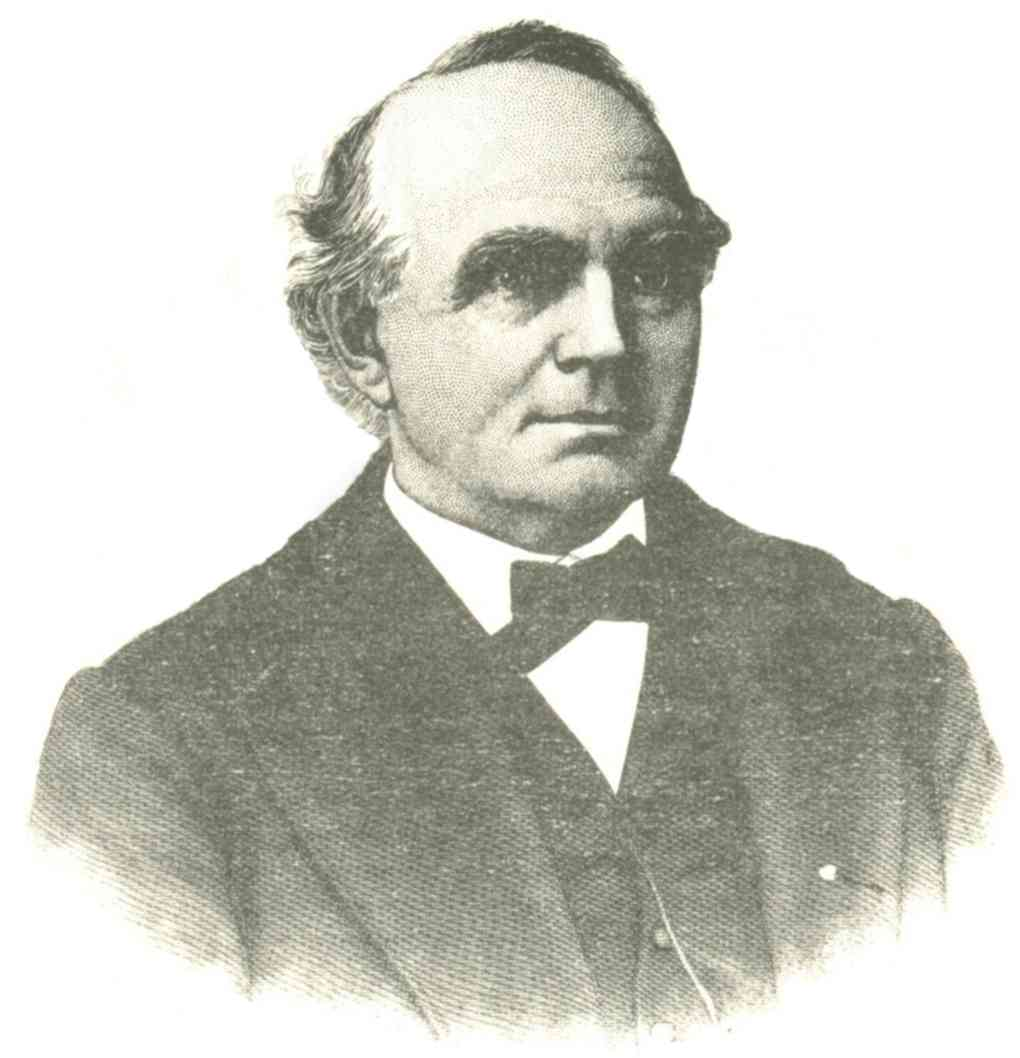
George Greene

Serranus Clinton Hastings served on the Iowa Supreme Court, and later became Chief Justice of the California Supreme Court.

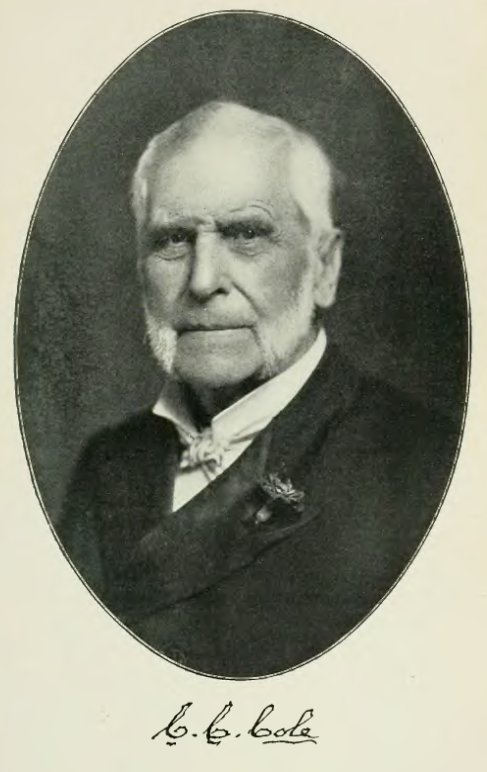
Chester C. Cole

Judge	County	Began active service	Ended active service
Austin Adams	Dubuque	January 1, 1876	December 31, 1887
Elma G. Albert	Greene	January 1, 1925	December 31, 1936
Robert G. Allbee	Polk	July 18, 1978	June 30, 1982
John W. Anderson	Woodbury	January 1, 1933	December 31, 1938
James H. Andreasen	Kossuth	November 13, 1987	October 1, 1998
Brent R. Appel	Warren	October 16, 2006	July 13, 2022
Thomas Arthur	Harrison	September 15, 1920	September 14, 1925
David L. Baker	Linn	April 4, 2008	December 31, 2010
Caleb Baldwin	Pottawattamie	January 11, 1860	December 31, 1863
Joseph M. Beck	Lee	January 1, 1868	December 31, 1891
Francis H. Becker	Dubuque	September 20, 1965	March 31, 1972
Charles A. Bishop	Polk	July 2, 1902	July 9, 1908
William L. Bliss	Cerro Gordo	September 27, 1932; January 1, 1939	December 5, 1932; April 16, 1962
Mark Cady	Webster	October 6, 1998	November 16, 2019
James H. Carter	Linn	August 14, 1982	October 16, 2006
Susan Christensen	Shelby	September 4, 2018	Incumbent
George C. Claussen	Clinton	October 21, 1932; April 17, 1933	December 4, 1932; December 3, 1934
Chester C. Cole	Polk	March 1, 1864	January 19, 1876
James G. Day	Fremont	September 1, 1870	December 31, 1883
Horace E. Deemer	Montgomery	May 8, 1894	February 26, 1917
Lawrence De Graff	Polk	January 1, 1921	December 31, 1932
John Forrest Dillon	Scott	January 1, 1864	December 31, 1869
Maurice F. Donegan	Scott	January 1, 1933	December 31, 1938
William D. Evans	Franklin	September 17, 1908	December 31, 1934
Frederick F. Faville	Webster	January 1, 1921	December 31, 1932
Theodore G. Garfield	Story	January 1, 1941	November 2, 1969
Harry F. Garrett	Wayne	December 15, 1958	December 31, 1960
Frank R. Gaynor	Plymouth	January 1, 1913	August 3, 1920
Josiah Given	Polk	March 12, 1889	December 31, 1901
Charles T. Granger	Allamakee	January 1, 1889	December 31, 1900
George Greene	Dubuque	November 1, 1847	January 9, 1855
John M. Grimm	Linn	February 1, 1929	September 15, 1932
Oscar Hale	Louisa	January 1, 1939	December 9, 1950
Jonathan C. Hall	Des Moines	February 15, 1854	January 15, 1855
Wilson H. Hamilton	Keokuk	January 1, 1935	December 31, 1940
K. David Harris	Greene	January 11, 1972	July 29, 1999
Serranus Clinton Hastings	Muscatine	January 26, 1848	January 14, 1849
Norman R. Hays	Marion	October 3, 1946	August 31, 1965
Daryl Hecht	Woodbury	August 1, 2006	December 13, 2018
Norman W. Isbell	Linn	January 16, 1855	June 2, 1856
John F. Kinney	Lee	June 12, 1847	February 15, 1854
James W. Kindig	Woodbury	April 30, 1927	December 31, 1934
La Vega G. Kinne	Tama	January 1, 1892	December 31, 1897
John W. Kintzinger	Dubuque	January 1, 1933	December 31, 1938
Scott M. Ladd	O'Brien	January 1, 1897	December 31, 1920
Jerry L. Larson	Shelby	September 1, 1978	May 31, 2008
Robert L. Larson	Johnson	February 3, 1953	April 1, 1971
Louis A. Lavorato	Polk	February 12, 1986	September 30, 2006
Clay LeGrand	Scott	July 5, 1967	February 26, 1983
Luke E. Linnan	Kossuth	September 3, 1958	December 15, 1958
Ralph P. Lowe	Lee	January 12, 1860	December 31, 1867
Edward Mansfield	Polk	February 23, 2011	Incumbent
Halleck J. Mantz	Audubon	January 1, 1943	January 1, 1953
Charles Mason	Des Moines	December 28, 1846	June 11, 1847
M. L. Mason	Cerro Gordo	July 19, 1965	June 14, 1978
David N. May	Polk	July 27, 2022	Incumbent
Emlin McClain	Johnson	January 1, 1901	December 31, 1912
Mark McCormick	Polk	April 12, 1972	January 31, 1986
Matthew McDermott	Polk	April 3, 2020	Incumbent
Christopher McDonald	Polk	February 20, 2019	Incumbent
Arthur A. McGiverin	Wapello	August 15, 1978	November 9, 2000
William E. Miller	Johnson	September 14, 1870	December 31, 1875
Frederic M. Miller	Polk	January 1, 1939	September 30, 1946
Ernest M. Miller	Shelby	December 27, 1937	December 13, 1938
Richard F. Mitchell	Webster	December 6, 1932	December 31, 1942
C. Edwin Moore	Polk	April 17, 1962	August 2, 1978
Edgar A. Morling	Palo Alto	October 1, 1925	October 15, 1932
John E. Mulroney	Webster	January 1, 1943	October 11, 1955
Linda K. Neuman	Scott	August 4, 1986	July 11, 2003
Dana Oxley	Linn	January 28, 2020	Incumbent
Ralph A. Oliver	Woodbury	December 14, 1938	October 1, 1962
James M. Parsons	Polk	January 1, 1935	December 16, 1937
Henry K. Peterson	Pottawattamie	November 3, 1955	June 30, 1965
Leon W. Powers	Crawford	December 4, 1934	February 14, 1936
Byron W. Preston	Mahaska	January 1, 1913	December 31, 1924
Maurice E. Rawlings	Woodbury	July 19, 1965	August 17, 1978
Joseph Rea Reed	Pottawattamie	January 1, 1884	February 28, 1889
Warren J. Rees	Jones	November 13, 1969	August 2, 1980
W. Ward Reynoldson	Clarke	May 1, 1971	October 1, 1987
Paul W. Richards	Montgomery	January 1, 1935	December 31, 1940
Gifford S. Robinson	Buena Vista	January 1, 1888	December 31, 1889
James H. Rothrock	Cedar	February 24, 1876	December 31, 1896
Edward A. Sager	Bremer	January 1, 1937	December 31, 1942
Benjamin I. Salinger	Carroll	January 1, 1915	December 31, 1920
Louis W. Schultz	Johnson	August 19, 1980	September 6, 1993
William H. Seevers	Mahaska	February 27, 1876	December 31, 1888
John Sherwin	Cerro Gordo	January 1, 1900	December 31, 1912
William A. Smith	Dubuque	January 1, 1943	June 10, 1958
Bruce M. Snell Jr.	Ida	October 8, 1987	August 18, 2001
Bruce M. Snell	Ida	January 1, 1961	March 4, 1970
Truman S. Stevens	Fremont	May 1, 1917	December 31, 1934
Carl B. Stiger	Tama	February 15, 1936	December 31, 1942
Lacon D. Stockton	Des Moines	June 3, 1856	June 9, 1860
Michael Streit	Lucas	August 19, 2001	December 31, 2010
William Corwin Stuart	Lucas	October 15, 1962	November 8, 1971
Marsha Ternus	Polk	September 7, 1993	December 31, 2010
G. King Thompson	Linn	January 1, 1951	June 30, 1965
T. Eugene Thornton	Black Hawk	January 1, 1959	May 9, 1967
Harvey Uhlenhopp	Franklin	March 10, 1970	May 22, 1986
Hubert Utterback	Polk	December 5, 1932	April 16, 1933
Charles W. Vermillion	Appanoose	November 15, 1923	September 3, 1927
Henry F. Wagner	Keokuk	September 6, 1927	December 31, 1932
Charles M. Waterman	Scott	January 1, 1898	June 18, 1902
Thomas D. Waterman	Scott	February 23, 2011	Incumbent
Silas M. Weaver	Hardin	January 1, 1902	November 6, 1923
Charles F. Wennerstrum	Lucas	January 1, 1941	December 31, 1958
David Wiggins	Polk	October 7, 2003	March 13, 2020
Joseph Williams	Muscatine	December 28, 1846; January 15, 1849	January 25, 1848; January 11, 1855
Elias Hewitt Williams	Clayton	January 18, 1870	September 14, 1870
Thomas Stokeley Wilson	Dubuque	December 28, 1846	October 31, 1847
Winfield S. Withrow	Henry	April 19, 1913	December 31, 1914
Charles R. Wolle	Woodbury	March 11, 1983	August 12, 1987
William G. Woodward	Muscatine	January 9, 1855	January 11, 1860
George G. Wright	Van Buren	January 5, 1855; June 26, 1860	January 11, 1860; September 1, 1870
Bruce B. Zager	Black Hawk	February 23, 2011	September 3, 2018
