= University of Iowa College of Law =

Law school in Iowa City, Iowa, US

The University of Iowa College of Law
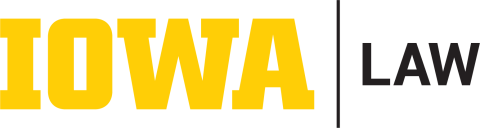
- Established: 1865
- School type: Public
- Dean: Todd Pettys
- Location: Iowa City, Iowa, U.S.
- Enrollment: 491 (2024)
- Faculty: 47 full-time (2025)
- USNWR ranking: 32nd (tie) (2026)
- Website: www.law.uiowa.edu

The University of Iowa College of Law is the law school of the University of Iowa, located in Iowa City, Iowa. It was founded in 1865 by two Iowa Supreme Court justices.

== History ==
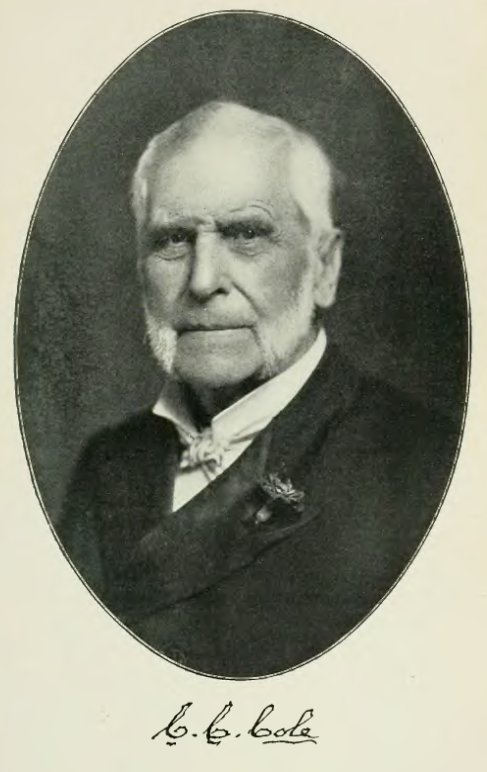
Co-founder Justice Chester C. Cole

The law school was founded in 1865 by George Grover Wright and Chester C. Cole as an independent law school in the state capital of Des Moines as Iowa School of Law, but it moved to Iowa City and became part of the University of Iowa in 1868. It is the oldest law school west of the Mississippi River. Iowa's College of Law is said to have graduated the first female law student in the nation, Mary Beth Hickey, in 1873. The second woman to graduate from Iowa Law was Mary Humphrey Haddok in 1875, who later became the first woman admitted to practice before the U.S. District and Circuit Courts. Alexander G. Clark, Jr. was the first African American to graduate from the law school, and his father Alexander G. Clark was the second. The senior Clark was ambassador to Liberia in 1890–1891.

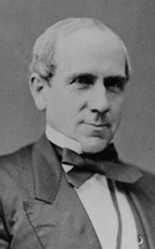
Co-founder Justice George Grover Wright

When the Law Building was built in 1986, the project included a low-rise library, classrooms, auditoriums, moot courts, and administrative facilities. The architect was Gunnar Birkets & Associates and the structural engineer was Leslie E. Robertson Associates. The law library has the second-largest collection of volumes and volume-equivalents and the second or third largest number of unique individual cataloged volume and volume-equivalent titles among all law school libraries. It contains more than one million volumes and volume equivalents and is one of the largest and finest collections of print, microform, and electronic legal materials in the United States.

For more than 30 yrs, the law school has sponsored "Bridging the Gap," a minority pre-law conference held at the law school. It participates in, and supports, CLEO and PLSI.

The Boyd Law Building is located in the center of the campus on a bluff overlooking the Iowa River.

== Law journals ==
The Law School has four academic journals, including the Iowa Law Review, founded in 1915 as the Iowa Law Bulletin. It is a scholarly legal journal, analyzing developments in the law and suggesting future paths for the law to follow. The Iowa Law Review ranks high among the top "high impact" legal periodicals in the country, and its subscribers include legal practitioners and law libraries throughout the world.

- Iowa Law Review, ranked 20th overall law review in Washington and Lee University School of Law's index of legal journals.
- Journal of Corporation Law, ranked 2nd overall law review in Washington and Lee University School of law's index of legal journals in the area of corporations and associations, and 60th overall law review in Washington and Lee University School of Law's index of legal journals.
- Transnational Law & Contemporary Problems
- Journal of Gender, Race & Justice

== Employment ==
According to the Iowa College of Law's official 2019 ABA-required disclosures, 89.3% of the Class of 2019 obtained full-time, long-term, JD-required employment within nine months after graduation. Iowa's Law School Transparency under-employment score is 5.7%, indicating the percentage of the Class of 2019 unemployed, pursuing an additional degree, or working in a non-professional, short-term, or part-time job nine months after graduation.

== Costs ==
The total tuition and mandatory fees for the 2024–2025 academic year are $32,512 for Iowa residents and $53,759 for non-resident students.

== Notable alumni ==
- James H. Andreasen (1958), Justice of the Iowa Supreme Court (1987–1998)
- Bruce Braley (1983), U.S. Representative (D-IA)
- Celeste F. Bremer (1977), U.S. Magistrate Judge, U.S. District Court for the Southern District of Iowa, 1985-2021
- Christopher Brown (author) (1991), science fiction writer
- Daniel E. Burrows (2008), Assistant Attorney General for Legal Policy, U.S. Department of Justice (2026-present); Chief Deputy Attorney General of Kansas (2023-25)
- James H. Carter (1960), Justice of the Iowa Supreme Court (1982–2006)
- Alexander Clark (1884), U.S. Ambassador to Liberia; successfully litigated Iowa state desegregation case nearly ninety years before Brown v. Board of Education (1954)
- George W. Clarke (1878), Iowa governor
- Norm Coleman (1976), former U.S. Senator (R-MN)
- Bill Crews (1977) Mayor of Melbourne, Iowa (1984-1998); Advisory Neighborhood Commissioner, Washington, DC, (2003-2005,2011-2012); DC Zoning Administrator (2005-2007)
- Lester J. Dickinson (1899), U.S. Representative (1919–1931), and U.S. Senator (1931–1937)
- Rita B. Garman (1968), Justice of the Illinois Supreme Court
- Theodore G. Garfield (1917), Justice of the Iowa Supreme Court (1941–1969), Chief Justice (1961–1969)
- K. David Harris (1951), Justice of the Iowa Supreme Court (1972–1999)
- John Hammill (1897), served three terms as the 24th Governor of Iowa from 1925 to 1931
- William Cook Hanson (1935), Senior federal district judge (1962–1995)
- Paul P. Harris, founder of Rotary International
- Bourke B. Hickenlooper (1922), former Iowa governor (1943–1945), and U.S. Senator (1945–1969)
- Paula Hicks-Hudson, lawyer, Toledo, Ohio Mayor and former Toledo City Council President
- Leo A. Hoegh (1932), former Iowa governor (1955–1957), Director of the Office of Civil and Defense Mobilization, and member of National Security Council
- Brian H. Hook (1999), former Special Assistant to President George W. Bush, and senior advisor to the U.S. Ambassador to the United Nations from 2006 to 2008
- Rachelle Keck, president of Grand View University (2022–), president of Briar Cliff University (2018–2022)
- William S. Kenyon (1890), U.S. Senator (1911–1922), and circuit judge for the United States Court of Appeals for the Eighth Circuit (1922–1933)
- Nile Kinnick (1940, attended), 1939 Heisman Trophy winner, 1939 Maxwell Award winner, consensus All-American, World War II veteran, inducted into the College Football Hall of Fame, and 1939 AP Male Athlete of the Year.
- Jeff Konya (1998), athletics director at San Jose State University
- Keith Kreiman (1978), former member of both the Iowa House of Representatives (1993–2003) and the Iowa Senate (2003–2011)
- Jerry L. Larson (1960), Justice of the Iowa Supreme Court (1978–2008)
- Donald P. Lay (1951), circuit judge for the United States Court of Appeals for the Eighth Circuit (1966–2007), Chief Justice (1980–1992)
- Ronald Earl Longstaff (1965), Senior federal district court judge (1991–present)
- Thomas E. Martin (1927), U.S. Representative (1939–1955), and U.S. Senator (1955–1961)
- Edward J. McManus (1942), Senior federal district court judge (1962–2017)
- Michael J. Melloy (1974), Federal judge on the United States Court of Appeals for the Eighth Circuit
- Ronald Moon (1965), Chief Justice of the Supreme Court of Hawaii (1993–2010)
- W. Ward Reynoldson (1948), Justice of the Iowa Supreme Court (1971–1987), Chief Justice (1978–1987)
- Tom Riley (1952), Iowa politician and trial attorney
- Coleen Rowley (1980), Retired FBI Special Agent and Time Magazine 2002 Woman of the Year
- Rob Sand (2010), 33rd Iowa State Auditor
- Frederick "Duke" Slater (1928), All-American College Football Player, and second African-American municipal judge in Chicago, IL
- Bruce M. Snell, Jr. (1956), Justice of the Iowa Supreme Court (1987–2001)
- Daniel F. Steck (1906), U.S. Senator (1926–1931)
- Roy L. Stephenson (1940), Chief federal district court judge, Southern District of Iowa (1960–1971), and circuit judge of the United States Court of Appeals for the Eighth Circuit (1971–1982)
- William C. Stuart (1942), Senior federal district court judge (1971–2010)
- Philip W. Tone (1948), Federal judge on the United States Court of Appeals for the Seventh Circuit
- Harold Vietor (1958), Senior federal district court judge (1979–present)
- Thomas D. Waterman (1984), Justice of the Iowa Supreme Court (2011–present)
- George A. Wilson (1907), Governor of Iowa (1939–42), and U.S. Senator (1943–1949)
- Charles R. Wolle (1961), Justice of the Iowa Supreme Court (1983–1987) and senior federal district judge (1987–2021)
- Dana L. Oxley (1998), Associate Justice of the Iowa Supreme Court
- Christopher L. McDonald (2001), Associate Justice of the Iowa Supreme Court
- Karin Nelsen (1993), Executive Vice President & Chief Legal Officer for the Minnesota Vikings
- Kara Westercamp (2009), Associate White House Counsel and Judge for the United States Court of International Trade
- Beulah Wheeler (1924), Iowa Law's first female African American graduate

== Notable faculty ==
- Austin Adams (1875–1890), lecturer and Justice of the Iowa Supreme Court from 1876 to 1887.
- David Baldus (1969–2011), notable academic in the field of Capital Punishment whose research was a key component in Furman v. Georgia (1972)
- Willard L. Boyd (1954–2022), President Emeritus of the University of Iowa and the Field Museum of Natural History
- Herbert F. Goodrich (1914–1922), co-founder of the Iowa Law Review, and circuit judge for the United States Court of Appeals for the Third Circuit (1940–1947)
- Herbert Hovenkamp (1986–2017), expert in Antitrust law
- A. Leo Levin (1919–2015), also law professor at the University of Pennsylvania Law School
- Eugene Wambaugh (1889–1892), introduced the Langdell case method to the University of Iowa Law School, and published the first Iowa casebook

=== List of deans ===
- George Grover Wright (1865–1868), as co-founder of independent law school based in Des Moines
- William Gardiner Hammond (1868–1881)
- Lewis Williams Ross (1881–1887)
- James M. Love (1887–1890)
- Emlin McClain (1890–1901)
- Charles Gregory (1901–1911)
- Austin Scott (interim; 1911–1912)
- Henry Wesley Dunn (interim; 1912–1914)
- Charles Gregory (second term; 1915–1916)
- Dudley Odell McGovney (1916–1921)
- Henry Craig Jones (1921–1929)
- Eugene A. Gilmore (1929–1935)
- Wiley B. Rutledge (1935–1939)
- Mason Ladd (1939–1966)
- David H. Vernon (1966–1971)
- Lawrence Blades (1971–1976)
- N. William Hines (1976–2004)
- Carolyn C. Jones (2004–2010)
- Gail Agrawal (2010–2018)
- Kevin Washburn (2018–2024)
- Todd Pettys (interim; 2025)
- Todd Pettys (2025–Pres.)
