= Elma G. Albert =

American judge (1866–1942)

Elma Albert

Chief Justice of the Iowa Supreme Court
- In office July 1, 1933 – December 31, 1933
- Preceded by: James W. Kindig
- Succeeded by: Richard F. Mitchell
- In office January 1929 – December 1929
- Preceded by: Truman S. Stevens
- Succeeded by: Edgar A. Morling

Associate Justice of the Iowa Supreme Court
- In office January 1, 1925 – December 21, 1936
- Preceded by: Byron W. Preston
- Succeeded by: Edward A. Sager

Judge of Iowa's 16th Judicial District
- In office January 1, 1915 – November 1924

Greene County Attorney
- In office January 1, 1900 – 1906

Personal details
- Born: June 5, 1866; Hampton, Pennsylvania
- Died: February 19, 1942 (aged 75); Jefferson, Iowa
- Spouse: Alice Alhert
- Children: 2
- Education: Drake University

Elma Gates Albert (June 5, 1866 – February 19, 1942) was a justice of the Iowa Supreme Court from January 1, 1925, to December 21, 1936, elected from Greene County, Iowa. For one and a half years he was Chief Justice.

== Life ==
Born in Hampton, Pennsylvania on June 5, 1866 to Daniel Albert and Margaret Getz Albert. His family moved in 1870 to Iowa. He was graduated from the Law Department of Drake University in 1891. He began practicing law in Greene County. He was elected County Attorney of Greene County serving from January 1, 1900 until 1906. In 1914 he was elected Judge of the District Court where he continued until his election to the Supreme Bench in November 1924.

He married Alice Elizabeth Alhert in 1897. They had a son and daughter.

After his retirement from the bench he resided in Jefferson, Iowa until his death February 19, 1942 from a Cerebral Hemorrhage.

Political offices
Preceded by Byron W. Preston	Justice of the Iowa Supreme Court; 1925–1936	Succeeded by Edward A. Sager
