= Justice Snell =

Justice Snell may refer to:

- Bruce M. Snell (1895–1976), associate justice of the Iowa Supreme Court from 1961 to 1970
- Bruce M. Snell Jr. (1929–2019), associate justice of the Iowa Supreme Court from 1987 to 2001
