= Justice Miller =

Justice Miller may refer to:

- Samuel Freeman Miller (1816–1890), justice of the Supreme Court of the United States
- Andrew G. Miller (1801–1874), associate justice of the Territorial Wisconsin Supreme Court
- Asher Miller (1752–1821), associate justice of the Connecticut Supreme Court
- Benjamin K. Miller (judge) (born 1936), associate justice of the Supreme Court of Illinois
- Benjamin M. Miller (1864–1944), associate justice of the Supreme Court of Alabama
- Bert H. Miller (1876–1949), associate justice of the Idaho Supreme Court
- Ernest M. Miller (1890–1941), associate justice of the Iowa Supreme Court
- Frederic M. Miller (1896–1958), associate justice of the Iowa Supreme Court
- Henry C. Miller (1828–1899), associate justice of the Louisiana Supreme Court
- John Miller (Indiana judge) (1840–1898), associate justice of the Supreme Court of Indiana
- Justin Miller (judge) (1888–1973), associate justice of the United States Court of Appeals for the District of Columbia
- Nathan L. Miller (1868–1953), justice of the New York Supreme Court from 1903 to 1915
- Oliver Miller (judge) (1824–1892), associate justice of the Maryland Court of Appeals
- Robert A. Miller (judge) (born 1939), former chief justice of the South Dakota Supreme Court
- Robert H. Miller (judge) (1919–2009), chief justice of the Kansas Supreme Court
- Theodore Miller (1816–1895), judge of the New York Court of Appeals
- Thomas B. Miller (judge) (died 2008), associate justice of the Supreme Court of Appeals of West Virginia
- Warren Miller (West Virginia politician) (1847–1920), associate justice of the Supreme Court of Appeals of West Virginia
- William E. Miller (Iowa judge) (1823–1897), associate justice of the Iowa Supreme Court
- William N. Miller (1855–1928), associate justice of the Supreme Court of Appeals of West Virginia
- Willis D. Miller (1893–1960), justice of the Supreme Court of Appeals of Virginia

== See also ==
- Lindsey Miller-Lerman (born 1947), associate justice of the Nebraska Supreme Court
- Judge Miller (disambiguation)
