= Cookies Food Products, Inc. v. Lakes Warehouse Distributing, Inc. =

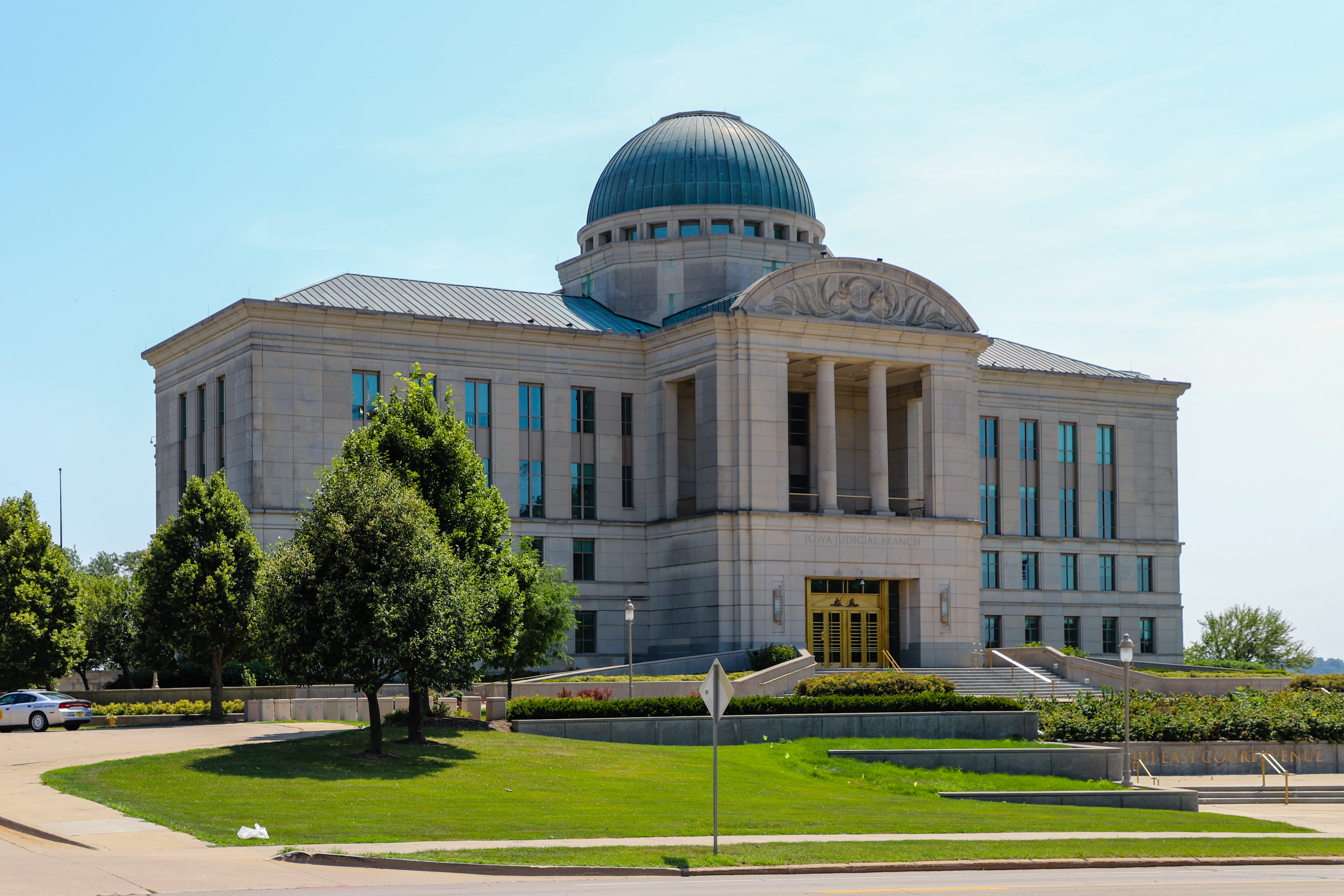
- Court: Supreme Court of Iowa
- Full case name: Cookies Food Products, Incorporation v. Lakes Warehouse Distributing, Incorporation
- Decided: October 19, 1988

Court membership
- Chief judge: David K. Harris
- Associate judges: Linda K. Neuman, Bruce M. Snell, Jr., James H. Andreasen

Case opinions
- Dissent: Louis W. Schultz

Cookies Food Products, Inc. v. Lakes Warehouse Distributing, Inc., 430 N.W.2d 447 (Iowa 1988), was a pivotal case decided by the Supreme Court of Iowa. The case addressed the fiduciary duty of loyalty owed by a majority shareholder and director to a closely held corporation and its minority shareholders, specifically in the context of self-dealing transactions. The central legal question was whether the director's self-interested business contracts with the company were fair and reasonable.

The court affirmed the trial court's decision, concluding that the director in this case had not breached his duties. The ruling is most known for establishing that directors who engage in self-dealing carry the burden of proving the fairness of the transaction to the corporation. The decision also clarified that a director’s duty to disclose information about management-level decisions is owed primarily to the board of directors, not to the shareholders. As a result, the case remains a foundational precedent in Iowa corporate law for issues concerning closely held businesses and shareholder rights.

== Background ==
The plaintiff is a collective of minority shareholders of Cookies Food Products, Inc. (Cookies). Cookies was founded in 1975 in Iowa with the initial goal of producing and distributing barbecue sauce. The company's early operations struggled and looked to Duane Herrig, a current stockholder for help.

Duane Herrig (Herrig) and his other solely owned companies Lakes Warehouse Distributing, Inc. (Lakes) and Speed's Automotive Co., Inc. (Speed's) are the defendants. Herrig, who owned stock in Cookie's at the time entered into an exclusive distribution agreement between Cookies and Lakes. Lakes became responsible for marketing and distributing Cookie's barbecue sauce through its existing routes including delivering auto parts.

In 1981, Herrig became majority stockholder of Cookie's to the plaintiffs' dismay. Once in majority, Herrig selected 4 out 5 board member replacements. Herrig extended Lakes exclusive distributorship agreement and paid Lakes the "going rate." He expanded his role into product development and paid himself royalty fees for the newly developed taco sauce recipe. The board authorized multiple compensation increases and consultant fees to Herrig's other companies.

== Argument ==
The minority shareholders of Cookies Food Products, Inc. initiated a derivative lawsuit against Duane Herrig and his affiliated companies alleging a breach of fiduciary duty. Their core issue was that Herrig, as a controlling shareholder and director, had engaged in self-dealing transactions that unfairly benefited his personal interests at the expense of Cookies.

The plaintiffs challenged the exclusive distributorship agreement with Lakes Warehouse for short-term storage services provided by Lakes to Cookies, and the consulting fees paid to Herrig's other company, Speed's for his role in developing a new taco sauce product. The shareholders argued that Herrig exploited his position to divert profits to his own companies rather than to Cookies or its shareholders.

== Decision ==
=== Lower Court's ruling ===
The trial court sided with Duane Herrig and his companies. It determined that Herrig's conduct and the contested agreements had not adversely affected Cookies. Rather, the court found they had clearly contributed to the corporation's welfare. This finding was heavily influenced by the substantial and rapid growth in Cookies' sales and overall financial health that occurred under Herrig's leadership. The court determined that the company's success outweighed the claims of harm from self-dealing.

=== Supreme Court decision and ruling ===
The Iowa Supreme Court acknowledged the principle that a corporate director who engages in a self-dealing transaction bears the burden of proving the fairness of the transaction to the corporation. The Court supported the trial court's conclusion that Herrig had successfully met this burden of proof. The majority decision was authored by Justice Neuman. The court’s decision highlighted the substantial growth and profitability experienced by Cookies as a direct result of the agreements with Herrig's companies, reinforcing the view that the transactions were advantageous to Cookies. The court's decision was heavily influenced by the evidence that Herrig was the "driving force" behind the company's success, with even the plaintiffs' expert conceding that Herrig performed the work of multiple people and might even be underpaid. The court also held that a director's duty to disclose information about management-level decisions is owed primarily to the board of directors, not to individual shareholders who do not participate in those decisions. As a result, the court concluded that Herrig did not have to disclose the extent of his profits to the shareholders, as the board had the authority to request that information.

=== Dissenting decision ===
Justice Schultz issued a dissenting opinion, arguing that the majority had misapplied the burden of proof in cases involving director self-dealing. He contended that the majority effectively placed the burden on the plaintiffs to demonstrate the unfairness of the transactions, rather than strictly requiring the defendant to. He argued that showing the success of the company does not show the fair market value of his services. The plaintiff had been the one to have shown this and it was significantly less than what Herrig was paid. Therefore, Justice Schultz stated:

I believe that the trial court and the majority opinion have been so enthralled by the success of the company that they have failed to examine whether these matters of self-dealing were fair to the stockholders. While much credit is due to Herrig for the success of the company, this does not mean that these transactions were fair to the company.

== Impact and legal significance ==
This case holds significant legal importance in Iowa corporate law. The ruling solidified the principle that while self-dealing by a corporate director is subject to examination, they can be upheld if the director can demonstrate their fairness to the corporation. It highlights that directors must be prepared to present clear evidence that certain actions are not merely self-serving but genuinely advantageous to the company. Cookies Food Products, Inc. v. Lakes Warehouse Distributing, Inc. was cited in Hanrahan v. Kruidenier, 473 N.W.2d 184 to share that in accordance with the business judgement rule, directors do act in good faith and in the best interest of their corporation.
