= James W. Kindig =

American judge (1879–1950)

James Kindig

Chief Justice of the Iowa Supreme Court
- In office January 1, 1933 – July 1, 1933
- Preceded by: Truman S. Stevens
- Succeeded by: Elma G. Albert

Associate Justice of the Iowa Supreme Court
- In office January 1, 1951 – June 30, 1965
- Appointed by: John Hammill
- Preceded by: Newly Created Seat

Assistant Attorney General of Iowa
- In office January 1917 – December 1918
- Appointed by: H.M. Havner

Assistant County Attorney of Woodbury County
- In office July 1, 1915 – August 1, 1917

Personal details
- Born: December 3, 1879; Welton, Iowa
- Died: May 12, 1950 (aged 70); Sioux City, Iowa
- Political party: Republican
- Spouse: Gertrude Crossan (m. 1908)
- Children: 2
- Education: Morningside University (BA) (LLD); Washington State University (LLB)

James W. Kindig (December 3, 1879 – May 12, 1950) was a justice of the Iowa Supreme Court from April 30, 1927, to December 31, 1934, appointed from Woodbury County, Iowa.

== Early life ==
He was born in Welton, Iowa in 1879. He attended Morningside University in Sioux City, Iowa, graduating in 1906. He then graduated from Washington State University with a law degree in 1907. He later would obtain a doctorate law degree from Morningside University in 1930.

== Legal career ==
He practiced law in Sioux City with the firm Kindig, Stewart and Hatfield, Stewart being the former US Senator from Iowa David W. Stewart.

He was an Assistant County Attorney in Woodbury County under County Attorney Ole T. Naglestad from 1915 to 1917. He then served as Assistant Attorney General of Iowa under Attorney General H. M. Havner from 1917 to 1918. He then returned to law practice until his appointment to the state supreme court.

On April 19, 1927, Governor John Hammill appointed Kindig to a newly created seat on the Iowa Supreme Court. He returned to private practice in Sioux City after his judicial retirement.

== Personal life ==
He was married Gertrude Crossan on September 3, 1908 and had two children. He died in Sioux City in 1950.

Political offices
Preceded by Newly established seat	Justice of the Iowa Supreme Court; 1927–1934	Succeeded by Court substantially remade
