= William A. Smith (Iowa judge) =

American judge (1870–1958)

William Smith

Chief Justice of the Iowa Supreme Court
- In office January 1, 1953 – June 30, 1953
- Preceded by: John E. Mulroney
- Succeeded by: Norman R. Hays
- In office July 1, 1948 – December 31, 1948
- Preceded by: John E. Mulroney
- Succeeded by: Halleck J. Mantz
- In office January 1, 1944 – June 30, 1944
- Preceded by: John E. Mulroney
- Succeeded by: Halleck J. Mantz

Associate Justice of the Iowa Supreme Court
- In office January 1, 1943 – June 10, 1958
- Preceded by: Carl B. Stiger
- Succeeded by: Luke E. Linnan

Personal details
- Born: November 19, 1870
- Died: June 10, 1958 (aged 87)

William A. Smith (November 19, 1870 – June 10, 1958) was a justice of the Iowa Supreme Court from January 1, 1943, to June 10, 1958, appointed from Dubuque County, Iowa.

Political offices
Preceded by Carl B. Stiger	Justice of the Iowa Supreme Court; 1943–1958	Succeeded by Luke E. Linnan
