= Hubert Utterback =

Iowa Supreme Court justice

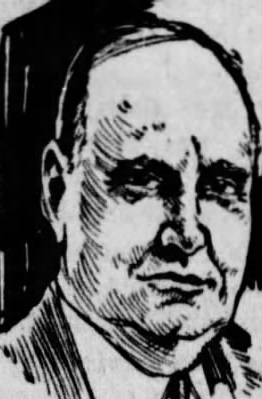
- From the November 7, 1934 edition of the Des Moines Register

Member of the U.S. House of Representatives from Iowa's 6th district
- In office January 3, 1935 – January 3, 1937
- Preceded by: Cassius C. Dowell
- Succeeded by: Cassius C. Dowell

Justice of the Iowa Supreme Court
- In office December 5, 1932 – April 16, 1933

Personal details
- Born: June 28, 1880 Hayesville, Iowa, U.S.
- Died: May 12, 1942 (aged 61) Des Moines, Iowa, U.S.
- Resting place: Glendale Cemetery
- Party: Democratic
- Relatives: John G. Utterback (cousin)
- Education: Drake University

Hubert Utterback (June 28, 1880 – May 12, 1942) served very briefly on the Iowa Supreme Court, then was elected as a Democrat to the United States House of Representatives, serving only one term.

== Personal background ==
Born on a farm near Hayesville, Iowa, Utterback attended the rural schools and Hedrick (Iowa) Normal and Commercial College. He graduated from Drake University in Des Moines, Iowa, studied law, and was admitted to the bar. He commenced practice in Des Moines, Iowa. Early in his practice, he began to teach, serving as an instructor at Drake University Law School from 1908 to 1935, and lecturing in law at Still College (now Des Moines University), Des Moines, Iowa from 1911 to 1933.

He served as member of the Iowa State Conference of Social Work and served as chairman of its legislative committee from 1923 to 1925.

== Judicial service ==
As a judge, he first served on the police court of Des Moines from 1912 to 1914, and was then elevated to the Ninth Iowa Judicial District, serving from 1915 to 1927.

According to the Iowa Supreme Court's biography of Utterback, he "served on the Iowa Supreme Court from December 5, 1932, when he was issued a certificate of election to fill a supposed vacancy, until April 16, 1933, when it was judicially determined that no vacancy on the court had existed, and therefore his election to the Supreme Court was a nullity." The episode began when Iowa Supreme Court Justice E. A. Morling died less than one month before the 1932 general election, and a controversy arose about whether a seat could become open to an election so close to the general election's date (or whether, conversely, no vacancy could exist until the scheduled completion of Morling's term several years later). Republican George C. Claussen was appointed to replace Morling and began to serve on the Court. However, the seat was added to the general election ballot, with the Republican Party nominating Claussen and the Democratic Party nominating Utterback. Utterback outpolled Claussen, received a certificate of election, and began to serve in Claussen's place. However, a legal challenge to his election succeeded, when a trial court judge concluded that the seat had not been open to election, ordered Claussen reinstated, and the Iowa Supreme Court upheld the ruling.

== Congressional elections and service ==
Utterback was the only Democrat elected by Iowa's 6th congressional district from its creation in 1920 until 1956. He defeated incumbent Republican Cassius C. Dowell in 1934, and served from January 3, 1935 to January 3, 1937.

In 1936 Utterback gave up a chance at re-election to his House seat, choosing instead to run for the U.S. Senate, but was defeated in the Democratic Primary by Iowa Governor Clyde L. Herring. That year, Dowell recaptured the House seat, defeating Harry Dunlap. Two years later, in 1938, Utterback tried unsuccessfully to win back his House seat, but Dowell easily won the rematch. The district would not send another Democrat to Congress until 1956, when Merwin Coad defeated James I. Dolliver by 198 votes, in one of Iowa's closest Congressional elections.

He was the cousin of John G. Utterback, who served in Congress from Maine from 1933 to 1935.

== After Congress ==
After leaving Congress, Utterback served as chairman of the State Board of Parole from 1937 to 1940, and served as a State Democratic National committeeman from 1937 to 1940.

He died in Des Moines, Iowa, on May 12, 1942. He was interred in Glendale Cemetery.

== External sources ==
- United States Congress. "Hubert Utterback (id: U000036)". Biographical Directory of the United States Congress.
- Iowa Judicial Branch Past Iowa Supreme Court Justices page for Hubert Utterback at the Wayback Machine (archived 2015-09-24)

U.S. House of Representatives
Preceded by Cassius C. Dowell	Member of the U.S. House of Representatives from Iowa's 6th congressional district 1935 – 1937 (obsolete district)	Succeeded by Cassius C. Dowell
Political offices
Preceded by George C. Claussen	Justice of the Iowa Supreme Court; 1933–1934	Succeeded by George C. Claussen
