= Oscar Hale =

American judge (1867–1950)

Chief Justice of the Iowa Supreme Court Acting
- In office April 1, 1949 – June 30, 1949
- Preceded by: Halleck J. Mantz
- Succeeded by: Norman R. Hays

Chief Justice of the Iowa Supreme Court
- In office January 1, 1945 – June 30, 1945
- Preceded by: Halleck J. Mantz
- Succeeded by: Frederic M. Miller
- In office January 1, 1941 – June 30, 1941
- Preceded by: Paul W. Richards
- Succeeded by: Frederic M. Miller

Associate Justice of the Iowa Supreme Court
- In office January 1, 1939 – December 9, 1950
- Preceded by: Maurice F. Donegan

Personal details
- Born: February 27, 1867
- Died: December 9, 1950 (aged 83)

Oscar Hale (February 27, 1867 – December 9, 1950) was a justice of the Iowa Supreme Court from January 1, 1939, to December 9, 1950, appointed from Louisa County, Iowa.

Political offices
Preceded by Maurice F. Donegan	Justice of the Iowa Supreme Court; 1939–1950	Succeeded by
