= William G. Woodward =

American judge and politician (1808–1871)

William Woodward

Justice of the Iowa Supreme Court
- In office January 9, 1855 – January 11, 1860

Personal details
- Born: May 20, 1808
- Died: February 24, 1871 (aged 62)

William G. Woodward (May 20, 1808 – February 24, 1871) was an American judge and politician.

Born in Hanover, New Hampshire, on May 20, 1808, Woodward moved to Iowa Territory in 1839, and was tasked by the second Iowa General Assembly in 1848 to draft a legal code, working alongside Charles Mason and Stephen Hempstead. The third General Assembly approved the code, which became known as the Code of 1851.

He served as a justice of the Iowa Supreme Court from January 9, 1855, to January 11, 1860, appointed from Muscatine County, Iowa. Between January 13, 1862 and January 10, 1864, Woodward was a Republican member of the Iowa Senate for District 14, then resigned the position to become clerk of the United States Circuit Court.

Political offices
Preceded by Joseph Williams	Justice of the Iowa Supreme Court; 1855–1860	Succeeded by
