= Deemer =

Deemer is a surname. Notable people with the surname include:

- Audrey Deemer (1930–2012), American baseball player
- Elias Deemer (1838–1918), American politician
- Horace E. Deemer (1858–1917), American judge

== See also ==
- Demmer
