= Kinzinger =

Kinzinger is a surname. Notable people with the surname include:

- Adam Kinzinger (born 1978), American politician
- Didi Contractor (1929–2021, née Delia Kinzinger), German-American architect
- Tonya Kinzinger (born 1968), American actress

== See also ==
- Matt Kinsinger (born 1977), an American former Arena Football League fullback/linebacker
- John W. Kintzinger (1870–1946), Iowa Supreme Court justice.
