= William D. Evans =

American judge

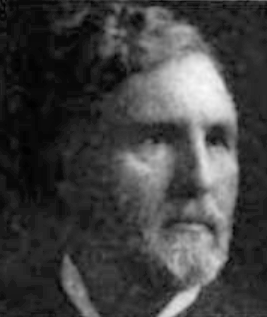

Justice of the Iowa Supreme Court
- In office 1908–1934

Personal details
- Born: May 10, 1852; Marquette County, Wisconsin
- Died: May 4, 1936 (aged 83); Hampton, Iowa
- Spouse: Julia Stark (m. 1879)
- Children: 5
- Occupation: Jurist

William D. Evans (May 10, 1852 – May 4, 1936) was a jurist in the State of Iowa from Hampton, Iowa.

== Biography ==
Evans was born to Evan J. and Ann Evans in Marquette County, Wisconsin. On October 29, 1879 he married Julia Stark. Evans was a Congregationalist.

He died at his home in Hampton on May 4, 1936.

== Career ==
Evans was a judge in the district court of Iowa from 1903 to 1908. From 1908 to 1934, he was a justice of the Iowa Supreme Court.

Political offices
Preceded by Charles A. Bishop	Justice of the Iowa Supreme Court; 1908–1934	Succeeded by Court substantially remade
