= Lacon D. Stockton =

Iowa Supreme Court justice (1814–1860)

Lacon Stockton

Justice of the Iowa Supreme Court
- In office June 3, 1856 – June 9, 1860

Personal details
- Born: 1814
- Died: June 9, 1860 (aged 45–46)

Portrait of Lacon Stockton

Lacon D. Stockton (1814 – June 9, 1860) was a justice of the Iowa Supreme Court from June 3, 1856, until his death on June 9, 1860, appointed from Des Moines County, Iowa, by Governor James W. Grimes.

Stockton was the first Iowa Supreme Court justice to die in office.

Political offices
Preceded by Norman W. Isbell	Justice of the Iowa Supreme Court; 1856–1860	Succeeded by
