= Adoniram Withrow =

American politician

Adoniram Judson Withrow (1825–1867) was an American politician.

Withrow was born in Greenbrier, Virginia in 1825. He relocated to Iowa, and represented District 10, encompassing Henry County in the Iowa House of Representatives from January 9, 1860, to January 12, 1862, as a Republican. During the American Civil War, Withrow served in the 25th Iowa Infantry Regiment.

Withrow married Libertatia A. Arnold on December 24, 1854. The couple raised three children, including Winfield S. Withrow. Adoniram died on June 6, 1867, of trichinosis. The Wilson Special Collections Library at the University of North Carolina at Chapel Hill holds the Adoniram Judson Withrow Papers.
