= Justice Arthur =

Justice Arthur may refer to:

- Claudeen Arthur (1942–2004), chief justice of the Supreme Court of the Navajo Nation
- Thomas Arthur (Iowa judge) (1860–1925), associate justice of the Iowa Supreme Court

== See also ==
- Arthur Justice (1902–1977), Australian rugby league footballer
