= William L. Bliss =

American judge (1876–1969)

Bill Bliss

Chief Justice of the Iowa Supreme Court
- In office January 1, 1957 – June 30, 1957
- Preceded by: G. King Thompson
- Succeeded by: Norman Hays
- In office January 1, 1954 – June 30, 1954
- Preceded by: Norman R. Hays
- Succeeded by: Theodore G. Garfield
- In office January 1, 1950 – June 30, 1950
- Preceded by: Norman R. Hays
- Succeeded by: Theodore G. Garfield
- In office January 1, 1946 – June 30, 1946
- Preceded by: Frederic M. Miller
- Succeeded by: Theodore G. Garfield
- In office January 1, 1942 – June 30, 1942
- Preceded by: Frederic M. Miller
- Succeeded by: Charles F. Wennerstrum
- In office July 1, 1939 – December 31, 1939
- Preceded by: Charles F. Wennerstrum
- Succeeded by: Paul W. Richards

Associate Justice of the Iowa Supreme Court
- In office January 1, 1939 – April 16, 1962
- Preceded by: John W. Anderson
- Succeeded by: C. Edwin Moore
- In office September 26, 1932 – December 5, 1932
- Appointed by: Dan W. Turner
- Preceded by: John M. Grimm
- Succeeded by: Richard F. Mitchell

Personal details
- Born: December 13, 1876 near Polk City, Iowa
- Died: January 29, 1969 (aged 92) Mason City, Iowa
- Spouse: Margaret A. McGruder (m.1895)
- Children: 3
- Education: Drake University (LLB)

William L. Bliss (December 13, 1876 – January 29, 1969) was appointed as justice of the Iowa Supreme Court.

== Life ==
He was born near Polk City in 1876 to Wentworth H. and Ellen (MacDonald) Bliss. He graduated from Guthrie County High School in 1895.

He graduated from Drake University Law Department in 1902 and began private practice in Britt. He moved to Mason City in 1914 where continued his private practice. He married Margaret McGruder on June 6, 1906 in Britt, Iowa, and they had 3 children.

On September 27, 1932, following the retirement of Justice John M. Grimm, he was appointed to the Iowa Supreme Court by Governor Dan W. Turner. He resigned his position following 1932 election, returning to private practice in Mason City. He was elected on January 1, 1939 and stay on the court until his retirement on April 16, 1962. He served as Chief Justice in the last 6 months of 1939.

Margaret died on April 20, 1955. Bill died in 1969 in Mason City. They were both interred at Elmwood-St. Joseph Cemetery in Mason City.

Political offices
| Preceded by John M. Grimm; John W. Anderson | Justice of the Iowa Supreme Court; 1932–1932; 1939–1962 | Succeeded by Richard F. Mitchell; C. Edwin Moore |
