= Joseph Beck =

Joseph Beck or Joe Beck may refer to:

- Joseph Beck (baritone) (1848–1903), Austrian operatic baritone
- Joseph D. Beck (1866–1936), United States congressman from Wisconsin
- Joseph M. Beck (1823–1893), justice of the Iowa Supreme Court, 1868–1891
- Joe Beck (1945–2008), American guitarist
- Josef Beck (1877–1936), Liechtenstein politician
- Józef Beck (1894–1944), Polish foreign minister
- József Beck (born 1952), Hungarian mathematician
