= Charles M. Waterman (judge) =

Iowa Supreme Court justice (1847–1924)

Charles Waterman
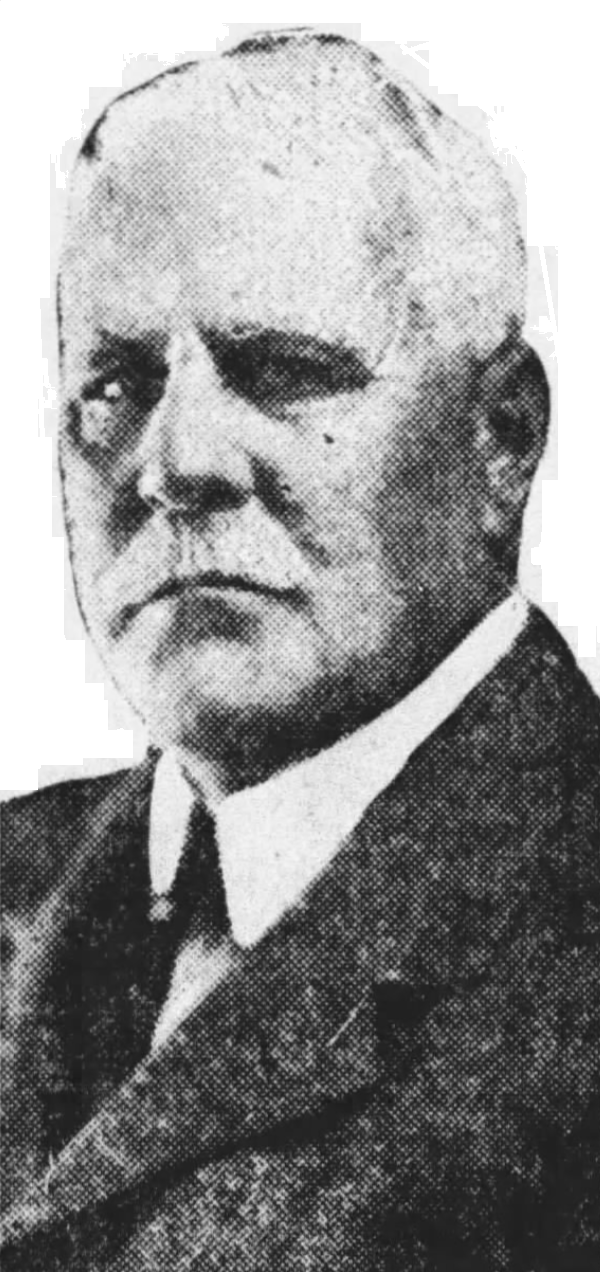
- Judge Charles M. Waterman.

Justice of the Iowa Supreme Court
- In office January 1, 1898 – June 18, 1902

Personal details
- Born: January 5, 1847 Frankfort, Kentucky
- Died: January 28, 1924 (aged 77)

Charles M. Waterman (January 5, 1847 – January 28, 1924) was a justice of the Iowa Supreme Court from January 1, 1898, to June 18, 1902, appointed from Scott County, Iowa.

Born in Frankfort, Kentucky, Waterman was admitted to the Iowa bar in 1871. After working for a time as a city attorney, Waterman was elected to the Iowa House of Representatives in 1877, and on June 28, 1887, was appointed by Governor William Larrabee to a seat on the Iowa Seventh Judicial Circuit. Waterman was reelected to the seat in November of that year, and again in 1890 and 1894. In 1898, he was elected to the state supreme court, serving until 1902, when he left to return to private practice.

He died in his home, after a lengthy illness.

Political offices
Preceded by La Vega G. Kinne	Justice of the Iowa Supreme Court; 1898–1902	Succeeded by Charles A. Bishop
