= John Sherwin =

John Sherwin may refer to:

- John C. Sherwin (1838–1904), American politician in Illinois
- John Sherwin (judge) (1851–1919), American politician and judge in Iowa
- John Sherwin (MP) (c.1527–1589), English politician
