= Clay LeGrand =

Iowa Supreme Court justice (1911–2002)

Justice of the Iowa Supreme Court
- In office July 5, 1967 – February 26, 1983

Personal details
- Born: February 26, 1911
- Died: November 17, 2002 (aged 91)

Clay LeGrand (February 26, 1911 – November 17, 2002) was a justice of the Iowa Supreme Court from July 5, 1967, to February 26, 1983, appointed from Scott County, Iowa. LeGrand died on November 17, 2002, at the age of 91.

Political offices
Preceded by T. Eugene Thornton	Justice of the Iowa Supreme Court; 1967–1983	Succeeded by Charles R. Wolle
