= Maurice F. Donegan =

American judge (1875–1950)

Justice of the Iowa Supreme Court
- In office January 1, 1933 – December 31, 1938

Chief Justice of the Iowa Supreme Court
- In office 1936–1936

United States Attorney for the Southern District of Iowa
- In office 1940–1949
- Appointed by: Franklin D. Roosevelt

Personal details
- Born: Maurice Francis Donegan; September 2, 1875 Welton Township, Clinton County, Iowa, U.S.
- Died: March 24, 1950 (aged 74) Davenport, Iowa, U.S.
- Party: Democratic
- Spouse: Mary I. Martin
- Education: Creighton University (A.B.); Georgetown University (A.M.); University of Iowa College of Law (LL.B.)
- Occupation: Judge, lawyer

Maurice Francis Donegan (September 2, 1875 – March 24, 1950) was an American jurist and lawyer from Iowa. A member of the Democratic Party, he served as a justice of the Iowa Supreme Court from 1933 to 1938, including one six-month term as chief justice, and later as United States Attorney for the Southern District of Iowa from 1940 to 1949.

== Early life and education ==
Donegan was born on a farm near Welton in Clinton County, Iowa, on September 2, 1875, to Jeremiah Donegan and Mary (Lucey) Donegan. He attended local district schools and high school in DeWitt, Iowa. He completed undergraduate study at Creighton University in Omaha, Nebraska, receiving an A.B. in 1895.

He later pursued legal studies at Georgetown University beginning in 1898, spending several years in its law program, and then completed his legal education at the University of Iowa College of Law, graduating in 1901.

== Legal career ==
After graduating from law school in 1901, Donegan began practice in Davenport, Iowa. He served as city attorney for Davenport from 1908 to 1912.

In 1913, Donegan was elected judge of Iowa’s Seventh Judicial District, headquartered in Davenport, and served until 1921, after which he returned to private practice.

== Iowa Supreme Court ==
Donegan was elected to the Iowa Supreme Court in the 1932 general election and took office on January 1, 1933. He served through December 31, 1938, including one six-month term as chief justice under the court’s rotation system. He was defeated for re-election in 1938 and left the court at the end of his term, replaced by Oscar Hale.

== United States Attorney ==
In 1940, Donegan was appointed United States Attorney for the Southern District of Iowa by Franklin D. Roosevelt, serving until 1949.

== Personal life ==
Donegan married Mary I. Martin on November 29, 1905. He was a Roman Catholic and belonged to the American Bar Association and the Knights of Columbus.

Donegan died in Davenport, Iowa, on March 24, 1950.

== See also ==
- List of justices of the Iowa Supreme Court
