= Winfield S. Withrow =

American judge (1855–1930)

Justice of the Iowa Supreme Court
- In office April 19, 1913 – December 31, 1914

Member of the Iowa House of Representatives
- In office 1884–1886

Personal details
- Born: Winfield Scott Withrow; September 28, 1855; Salem, Iowa
- Died: February 7, 1930 (aged 74); Mount Pleasant, Iowa
- Political party: Republican
- Education: State University of Iowa
- Occupation: Jurist, politician

Winfield Scott Withrow (September 28, 1855 – February 7, 1930) was a justice of the Iowa Supreme Court from April 19, 1913, to December 31, 1914, appointed from Henry County.

== Biography ==
Winfield S. Withrow was born in Salem, Iowa, on September 28, 1855, to parents Adoniram Withrow and Libertatia Arnold. He earned a law degree at the State University of Iowa in 1880. A Republican, he served one term in the Iowa House of Representatives. He was a district court judge, and was appointed to the state Supreme Court on April 19, 1913.

He was a longtime trustee of Iowa Wesleyan University.

He died in Mount Pleasant on February 7, 1930.

Political offices
Preceded by	Justice of the Iowa Supreme Court; 1913–1914	Succeeded by
