= Joseph Williams (justice) =

American judge

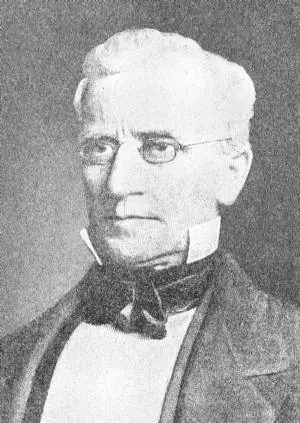
- Black-and-white portrait photograph of Williams

4th Chief Justice of the Iowa Supreme Court
- In office 1849–1855
- Preceded by: Serranus Clinton Hastings
- Succeeded by: George G. Wright

2nd Chief Justice of the Iowa Supreme Court
- In office 1847–1848
- Preceded by: Charles Mason
- Succeeded by: Serranus Clinton Hastings

Personal details
- Born: December 8, 1801
- Died: March 31, 1870 (aged 68)

Joseph Williams (December 8, 1801 – March 31, 1870) was a justice of the Kansas Territorial Supreme Court, and later chief justice of the Iowa Supreme Court. He served the court during Iowa's time as a territory. He was the state's second (1847-1848) and fourth chief justice (1849-1855).

Political offices
Preceded by Charles Mason; Serranus Clinton Hastings	Chief Justice of the Iowa Supreme Court; 1846–1848; 1849–1855	Succeeded by Serranus Clinton Hastings; William G. Woodward
