= Harvey Uhlenhopp =

American judge (1915–1986)

Clay LeGrand

Justice of the Iowa Supreme Court
- In office March 10, 1970 – May 22, 1986
- Preceded by: Bruce M. Snell
- Succeeded by: Linda K. Neuman

Personal details
- Born: June 23, 1915
- Died: May 22, 1986 (aged 70)

Harvey Harold Uhlenhopp (June 23, 1915 – May 22, 1986) was a justice of the Iowa Supreme Court from March 10, 1970, until his death in 1986, appointed from Franklin County, Iowa.

Political offices
Preceded by Bruce M. Snell	Justice of the Iowa Supreme Court; 1970–1986	Succeeded by Linda K. Neuman
