= George C. Claussen =

American judge (1882–1948)

George Claussen
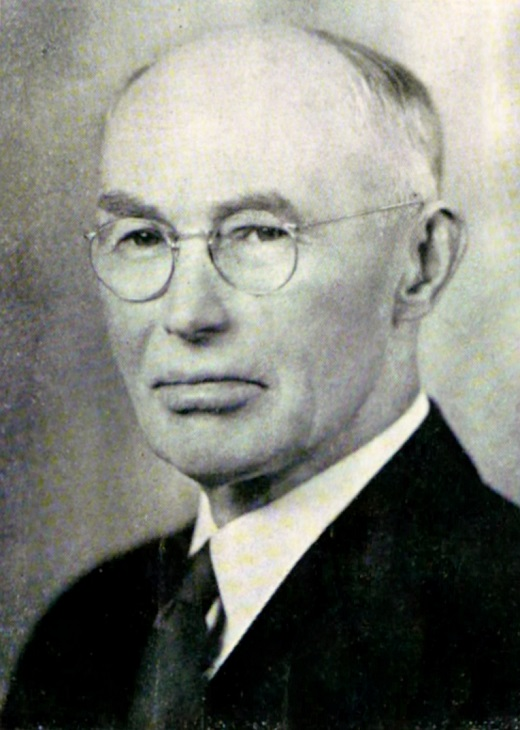
- Portrait of C. George Claussen (1882–1948) in 1945

Justice of the Iowa Supreme Court
- In office April 17, 1933 – December 3, 1934
- In office October 21, 1932 – December 4, 1932

Personal details
- Born: August 6, 1882
- Died: December 18, 1948 (aged 66)

George C. Claussen (August 6, 1882 – December 18, 1948) was a justice of the Iowa Supreme Court from October 21, 1932, to December 4, 1932, and again from April 17, 1933, to December 3, 1934, appointed from Clinton County, Iowa.

Political offices
Preceded by Edgar A. Morling; Hubert Utterback	Justice of the Iowa Supreme Court; 1932–1932; 1933–1934	Succeeded by Hubert Utterback; Leon W. Powers
