= Harold Duane Vietor =

American judge

Senior Judge of the United States District Court for the Southern District of Iowa
- In office December 29, 1996 – July 23, 2016

Chief Judge of the United States District Court for the Southern District of Iowa
- In office 1985–1992
- Preceded by: William Corwin Stuart
- Succeeded by: Charles R. Wolle

Judge of the United States District Court for the Southern District of Iowa
- In office May 11, 1979 – December 29, 1996
- Appointed by: Jimmy Carter
- Preceded by: Seat established by 92 Stat. 1629
- Succeeded by: Robert W. Pratt

Personal details
- Born: Harold Duane Vietor; December 29, 1931 Parkersburg, Iowa, U.S.
- Died: July 23, 2016 (aged 84) Tucson, Arizona, U.S.
- Education: University of Iowa (BA); University of Iowa College of Law (JD)

Harold Duane Vietor (December 29, 1931 – July 23, 2016) was a United States district judge of the United States District Court for the Southern District of Iowa.

== Education and career ==
Born in Parkersburg, Iowa in 1931, Vietor was in the United States Navy from 1952 to 1954. He received a Bachelor of Arts degree from the University of Iowa in 1955, and a Juris Doctor from the University of Iowa College of Law in 1958. He served as a law clerk for Judge Martin Donald Van Oosterhout of the United States Court of Appeals for the Eighth Circuit, from 1958 to 1959. He was in private practice in Cedar Rapids, Iowa from 1959 to 1965. In 1965 he was appointed as a judge of the Iowa District Court in Cedar Rapids, where he served until 1979, the last nine years as chief judge of his district.

== Federal judicial service ==
Vietor was nominated by President Jimmy Carter on March 15, 1979, to the United States District Court for the Southern District of Iowa, to a new seat authorized by 92 Stat. 1629. He was confirmed by the United States Senate on May 10, 1979, and received his commission on May 11, 1979. He served as Chief Judge from 1985 to 1992. He assumed senior status on December 29, 1996. His service terminated on July 23, 2016, due to his death in Tucson, Arizona from a stroke. He still heard cases until approximately one year before his death, when he moved to Tucson.

== Sources ==
Legal offices
Preceded by Seat established by 92 Stat. 1629	Judge of the United States District Court for the Southern District of Iowa; 1979–1996	Succeeded by Robert W. Pratt
Preceded by William Corwin Stuart	Chief Judge of the United States District Court for the Southern District of Iowa; 1985–1992	Succeeded by Charles R. Wolle
