= 28th Iowa Infantry Regiment =

- Iowa state flag
- Active: October 10, 1862, to July 31, 1865
- Country: United States
- Allegiance: Union
- Branch: Infantry
- Engagements: Battle of Port Gibson; Battle of Champion Hill; Battle of Big Black River; Siege of Vicksburg; Red River Campaign; Battle of Sabine Crossroads; Battle of Cedar Creek

The 28th Iowa Infantry Regiment was an infantry regiment that served in the Union Army during the American Civil War.

== Service ==
The 28th Iowa Infantry was organized at Iowa City, Iowa and mustered in for three years of Federal service on October 10, 1862. Iowa circuit court judge William E. Miller retired from the bench to become the colonel of the regiment at Camp Pope, near Iowa City. For two months they engaged in drilling of recruits, and in November of that year marched through Missouri to an encampment at Helena, Arkansas. The regiment engaged in various expeditions, but Miller "contracted a disease which meant death in the South", which forced him to return to Iowa in March 1863.

The regiment was mustered out on July 31, 1865.

== Total strength and casualties ==
A total of 1195 men served in the 28th Iowa during its existence It lost 6 officers and 76 enlisted men to combat action, and 3 officers and 186 enlisted men to disease, for a total of 271 fatalities.

== Commanders ==
- Colonel William E. Miller
- Colonel John Connell

== See also ==
- List of Iowa Civil War Units
- Iowa in the American Civil War
