= Edward A. Sager =

Iowa Supreme Court justice (1872–1943)

Edward Sager

Chief Justice of the Iowa Supreme Court
- In office July 1, 1938 – December 31, 1938

Associate Justice of the Iowa Supreme Court
- In office January 1, 1937 – December 31, 1942

Personal details
- Born: October 17, 1872
- Died: February 7, 1943 (aged 70) Red Oak, Iowa, U.S.

Edward A. Sager (October 17, 1872 – February 7, 1943) was a justice of the Iowa Supreme Court from January 1, 1937, to December 31, 1942, appointed from Bremer County, Iowa.

Political offices
| Preceded by | Justice of the Iowa Supreme Court; 1937–1942 | Succeeded by Halleck J. Mantz |
