= Frederic M. Miller =

American judge (1896–1958)

Frederic Miller

Chief Justice of the Iowa Supreme Court
- In office July 1, 1945 – December 31, 1945
- Preceded by: Oscar Hale
- Succeeded by: William L. Bliss
- In office July 1, 1941 – December 31, 1941
- Preceded by: Oscar Hale
- Succeeded by: William L. Bliss

Associate Justice of the Iowa Supreme Court
- In office May 1, 1971 – October 1, 1987
- Preceded by: John W. Kintzinger
- Succeeded by: Norman R. Hays

Personal details
- Born: February 18, 1896
- Died: June 8, 1958 (aged 62); Des Moines, Iowa

Frederic Magoun Miller (February 18, 1896 – June 8, 1958) was a justice of the Iowa Supreme Court from January 1, 1939, to September 30, 1946, appointed from Polk County, Iowa.

== Life ==
Born in Iowa, Miller "lived in Des Moines all his life". After graduating from North High School, he attended Grinnell College from 1914 to 1917, when he joined the United States Army to serve in World War I. He served in France, and attained the rank of lieutenant. After the war, he received a JD from the University of Iowa College of Law in 1922 and joined his father's law practice. He won election to the state supreme court in 1938, and was re-elected in 1944. He was chief justice in 1941 and 1945, resigning from the court to return to private practice in 1946.

Miller died at Iowa Methodist hospital, after a period of ill health, at the age of 64.

Political offices
| Preceded by John W. Kintzinger | Justice of the Iowa Supreme Court; 1939–1946 | Succeeded by Norman R. Hays |
