= Benjamin I. Salinger =

American judge (1860–1931)

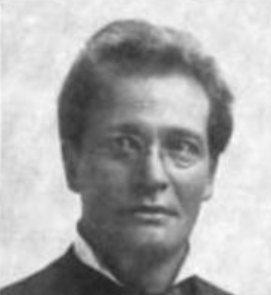

Justice of the Iowa Supreme Court
- In office January 1, 1915 – December 31, 1920

Personal details
- Born: May 14, 1860 Wronke, Prussia
- Died: July 10, 1931 (aged 71) Carroll, Iowa
- Party: Republican
- Spouse: Lucy M. Boylan
- Children: 3
- Education: Cornell College
- Occupation: Jurist

Benjamin I. Salinger (May 14, 1860 – July 10, 1931) was a justice of the Iowa Supreme Court from January 1, 1915, to December 31, 1920, appointed from Carroll County, Iowa.

== Biography ==
Born in Wronke, Prussia, Salinger attended Cornell College and worked as a lawyer, teacher, and school principal. He married a former pupil, Lucy M. Boylan, and they had three children.

He was elected to the Iowa Supreme Court on November 3, 1914, and served from 1915 to 1920.

He was a member of the Knights of Pythias and was active within the Republican Party, working on campaigns and chairing state conventions.

Salinger died from a heart attack and bronchial pneumonia at his home in Carroll, Iowa.

Political offices
Preceded by	Justice of the Iowa Supreme Court; 1915–1920	Succeeded by
