= Jonathan C. Hall =

Iowa Supreme Court justice (1808–1874)

Justice of the Iowa Supreme Court
- In office February 15, 1854 – January 15, 1855

Personal details
- Born: February 27, 1808
- Died: June 11, 1874 (aged 66)

Jonathan C. Hall (February 27, 1808 – June 11, 1874) was a justice of the Iowa Supreme Court from February 15, 1854, to January 15, 1855, appointed from Des Moines County, Iowa.

Political offices
Preceded by	Justice of the Iowa Supreme Court; 1854–1855	Succeeded by Norman W. Isbell
