= Elias Hewitt Williams =

American judge (1819–1891)

Elias Williams

Justice of the Iowa Supreme Court
- In office January 18, 1870 – September 14, 1870

Personal details
- Born: July 23, 1819 Groton, Connecticut
- Died: August 20, 1891 (aged 72)

Elias Hewitt Williams (July 23, 1819 – August 20, 1891) was a justice of the Iowa Supreme Court from January 18, 1870 to September 14, 1870, appointed from Clayton County, Iowa.

Williams was born in Groton, Connecticut, on July 23, 1819, and entered Yale College from that part of Groton which was incorporated as the town of Ledyard in 1836. His father died in his early childhood.

After graduation from Yale in 1840, he taught in New Hampshire for a year, and then migrated to South Carolina, where he continued teaching and began the study of law. Acquaintance with slavery operated to prevent his remaining in the South, and in 1846 he turned westwards and on arriving in northeastern Iowa, settled in Garnavillo, where in a short time he acquired a good practice as a lawyer. A strong desire for a more active life soon led him, however, to abandon the law and take up a large tract of land near Garnavillo for improvement as a farm.

From 1851 to 1855, he held the position of County Judge, and did much in that capacity to restore the public credit of the County. In 1858 he was elected District Judge of the Tenth Judicial District of the State, and was re-elected in 1862. These eight years of service were followed, in 1870, by an appointment to the Chief Justiceship of the Supreme Court; but he retained this office for a short time only, other interests claiming his entire attention.

At this period he originated the plan of a railway from Dubuque to St. Paul, and was connected with that enterprise through its earlier stages, until he started another effort, for a narrow gauge road across Iowa to the Missouri River. While engaged in the construction of this road, financial reverses overtook him, and a period of great anxiety and discouragement followed. He had already sold his Garnavillo farm, and had made a new home for himself on a large estate in Grand Meadow township in the northwestern part of the same county, which was now placed in jeopardy. After a severe struggle he was at length able, in 1882, to dispose of his railroad property; and with indomitable will he almost at once began the construction of another road in Grant County, Wisconsin (across the Mississippi River from his residence), and was thus finally enabled to extinguish the claims on his landed property.

He died at his home, on August 20, 1891, in his 73rd year.

In 1849 he married in his native State Hannah Larrabee, who survived him with their two sons and two daughters.

This article incorporates public domain material from the 1892 Yale Obituary Record.

Political offices
Preceded by	Justice of the Iowa Supreme Court; 1870–1870	Succeeded by William E. Miller
