= C. Edwin Moore =

American judge (1903–1988)

Charles Moore

Chief Justice of the Iowa Supreme Court
- In office November 11, 1969 – August 2, 1978
- Preceded by: Theodore G. Garfield
- Succeeded by: W. Ward Reynoldson

Associate Justice of the Iowa Supreme Court
- In office April 17, 1962 – August 2, 1978
- Appointed by: Norman Erbe
- Preceded by: William L. Bliss
- Succeeded by: Arthur A. McGiverin

Judge on the Iowa 9th Judicial District Court
- In office 1943 – April 17, 1962
- Appointed by: Norman Erbe

Des Moines Municipal Court
- In office 1936–1943

Polk County Attorney
- In office 1934–1936

Personal details
- Born: August 2, 1903; Des Moines, Iowa, U.S.
- Died: May 11, 1988 (aged 84); Des Moines, Iowa, U.S.
- Education: Drake University (LLB)

Charles Edwin Moore (August 2, 1903 – May 11, 1988) was a justice of the Iowa Supreme Court.

== Early life ==
Born on the east side of Des Moines, Iowa in 1903 to William H. Moore and Metta Mae Davis. He graduated from East High School in 1922. He received his LLB from Drake University in 1927.

== Legal and Judicial Career ==
He practiced law in Des Moines from 1927 to 1934. In 1934, he became a Polk County Attorney from 1934 to 1936. He was then elected to the Des Moines Municipal Court in 1936 until 1943 when he was elevated to Iowa 9th Judicial District Court. He held this job until 1962. In 1962, Governor Norman Erbe appointed Moore to a seat on the state supreme court, and in 1969 the members of the court chose him as their chief justice.

== Personal life ==
Moore married Margaret Douglas, of Des Moines, becoming the stepfather to her two sons and together had a daughter. He was a Methodist.

Political offices
| Preceded by William L. Bliss | Justice of the Iowa Supreme Court; 1962–1978 | Succeeded by Arthur A. McGiverin |
