= Arthur A. McGiverin =

American judge (1928–2019)

Arthur McGiverin

Chief Justice of the Iowa Supreme Court
- In office October 2, 1987 – November 10, 2000
- Preceded by: W. Ward Reynoldson
- Succeeded by: Louis A. Lavorato

Associate Justice of the Iowa Supreme Court
- In office August 11, 1978 – November 10, 2000
- Preceded by: C. Edwin Moore

Personal details
- Born: November 10, 1928 (age 97) Iowa City, Iowa
- Died: June 2, 2019 Iowa City, Iowa
- Spouse: Mary Joan Kuntz (m. 1951)
- Children: 4

Arthur A. McGiverin (November 10, 1928 – June 2, 2019) was an Associate Justice and Chief Justice of the Iowa Supreme Court serving longer than any other chief justice in Iowa history.

== Early life ==
He was born in 1928 to Joseph James and Mary Bernadette McGiverin in Iowa City. He graduated from McKinley High School in Cedar Rapids in 1946. He went to University of Iowa for his BS in Commerce in 1951 and from the University of Iowa's Law School in 1956.

== Legal and Judicial Career ==
He joined the practice of Barnes, Schlegel and McGiverin from 1956 to 1965. He was appointed to be a district judge from 1965 to 1978, when he was appointed to the Supreme Court. He was appointed as an Associate Justice to the Iowa Supreme Court in 1978 by Governor Robert D. Ray. He served as an Associate Justice until his appointment to Chief Justice in 1987. He served as Chief Justice until his retirement in 2000.

== Personal life ==
He married Mary Joan Kuntz on April 20, 1951 in Iowa City. They had 4 children.

Political offices
Preceded by C. Edwin Moore	Justice of the Iowa Supreme Court; 1978–2000	Succeeded by
