= James H. Carter =

American judge (1935–2016)

Associate Justice of the Iowa Supreme Court
- In office August 14, 1982 – October 16, 2006
- Nominated by: Robert D. Ray
- Preceded by: Robert G. Allbee
- Succeeded by: Brent Appel

Personal details
- Born: January 18, 1935 Waverly, Iowa
- Died: February 27, 2016 (aged 81)
- Education: University of Iowa (BA, JD)

James Harvey Carter (January 18, 1935 – February 27, 2016) was a justice of the Iowa Supreme Court from 1982 until 2006.

== Education ==
Carter was born in Waverly, Iowa and grew up in Clarksville, Iowa. He graduated from the University of Iowa with a B.A., then from the University of Iowa College of Law with a J.D., where he was elected to the Order of the Coif. During law school, Carter was a Notes Editor of the Iowa Law Review.

== Legal and judicial career ==
After graduating from law school, Carter worked as a judicial clerk to Judge Henry Norman Graven of the United States District Court for the Northern District of Iowa. He then practiced law in Cedar Rapids, Iowa at Shuttleworth & Ingersoll until 1973, when he was appointed to the Iowa District Court. In 1976, he was appointed to the Iowa Court of Appeals, and in 1982, he was appointed to the Iowa Supreme Court. Carter retired in 2006. Carter died on February 27, 2016.

Political offices
| Preceded by Robert G. Allbee | Justice of the Iowa Supreme Court; 1982–2006 | Succeeded by Brent Appel |
