= Frank R. Gaynor =

American judge (1852–1920)

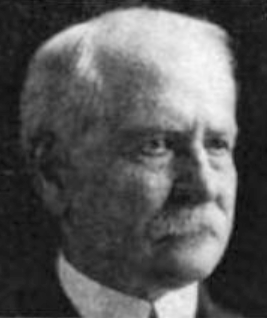

Justice of the Iowa Supreme Court
- In office January 1, 1913 – August 2, 1920

Personal details
- Born: September 2, 1852; Hamilton, Canada West
- Died: August 2, 1920 (aged 67); Des Moines, Iowa, United States
- Political party: Republican
- Spouse: Anna C. Judd (m. 1887)
- Children: 1
- Education: State University of Iowa
- Occupation: Jurist

Frank R. Gaynor (September 2, 1852 – August 2, 1920) was a justice of the Iowa Supreme Court from January 1, 1913, to August 2, 1920, appointed from Plymouth County.

== Biography ==
Frank R. Gaynor was born in Hamilton, Canada West, on September 2, 1852. He earned a law degree from the State University of Iowa in 1877.

He married Anna C. Judd in Iowa City on November 29, 1887. They had one daughter.

He was a district court judge before being elected to the state Supreme Court on November 5, 1912. He was a Republican.

Frank R. Gaynor died from heart disease at his home in Des Moines on August 2, 1920.

Political offices
Preceded by	Justice of the Iowa Supreme Court; 1913–1920	Succeeded by Thomas Arthur
