= Harry F. Garrett =

Iowa Supreme Court justice (1887–1971)

Harry Garrett

Justice of the Iowa Supreme Court
- In office December 15, 1958 – December 31, 1960

Personal details
- Born: December 24, 1887
- Died: August 10, 1971 (aged 83)

Harry F. Garrett (December 24, 1887 – August 10, 1971) was a justice of the Iowa Supreme Court from December 15, 1958, to December 31, 1960, appointed from Wayne County, Iowa.

Political offices
Preceded by Luke E. Linnan	Justice of the Iowa Supreme Court; 1958–1960	Succeeded by Bruce M. Snell
