= Judge Miller =

Judge Miller may refer to:

- Andrew Miller (North Dakota judge) (1870–1960), judge of the United States District Court for the District of North Dakota
- Andrew G. Miller (1801–1874), judge of the United States District Court for the District of Wisconsin and of the Eastern District of Wisconsin
- Brian S. Miller (born 1967), judge of the United States District Court for the Eastern District of Arkansas
- Christine Odell Cook Miller (born 1944), judge of the United States Court of Federal Claims
- Eric D. Miller (born 1975), judge of the United States Court of Appeals for the Ninth Circuit
- George W. Miller (judge) (1941–2016), judge of the United States Court of Federal Claims
- Gray H. Miller (born 1948), judge of the United States District Court for the Southern District of Texas
- Jack Miller (Iowa politician) (1916–1994), judge of the United States Court of Appeals for the Federal Circuit
- James Rogers Miller Jr. (1931–2014), judge of the United States District Court for the District of Maryland
- Jeffrey T. Miller (born 1943), judge of the United States District Court for the Southern District of California
- Joe Miller (Alaska politician) (born 1967), magistrate judge of the United States District Court for the District of Alaska
- John E. Miller (1888–1981), judge of the United States District Court for the Western District of Arkansas
- John Lester Miller (1901–1978), judge of the United States District Court for the Western District of Pennsylvania
- Loren Miller (1903-1967), civil rights attorney, publisher, and judge of the Los Angeles County Superior Court
- Philip R. Miller (1918–1989), judge of the United States Court of Federal Claims
- Robert Lowell Miller Jr. (born 1950), judge of the United States District Court for the Northern District of Indiana
- Shackelford Miller Jr. (1892–1965), judge of the United States Court of Appeals for the Sixth Circuit
- Walker David Miller (1939–2013), judge of the United States District Court for the District of Colorado
- Wilbur Kingsbury Miller (1892–1976), judge of the United States Court of Appeals for the District of Columbia Circuit
- William Ernest Miller (1908–1976), judge of the United States Court of Appeals for the Sixth Circuit

== See also ==
- Justice Miller
