= Luke E. Linnan =

Iowa Supreme Court justice (1895–1975)

Luke Linnan

Justice of the Iowa Supreme Court
- In office September 3, 1958 – December 15, 1958
- Preceded by: William A. Smith
- Succeeded by: Harry F. Garrett

Personal details
- Born: April 8, 1895
- Died: September 17, 1975 (aged 80)

Luke E. Linnan (April 8, 1895 – September 17, 1975) was a justice of the Iowa Supreme Court from September 3, 1958, to December 15, 1958, appointed from Kossuth County, Iowa.

Political offices
Preceded by William A. Smith	Justice of the Iowa Supreme Court; 1958–1958	Succeeded by Harry F. Garrett
