= Louis W. Schultz =

American judge (1927–2008)

Louis Schultz

Justice of the Iowa Supreme Court
- In office August 19, 1980 – September 6, 1993

Personal details
- Born: March 27, 1927 Deep River, Iowa
- Died: November 19, 2008 (aged 81) Williamsburg, Iowa

Military service
- Branch: United States Navy
- Rank: Pharmacist Mate, 3rd class
- Battles/wars: World War II

Louis W. Schultz (March 24, 1927 – February 19, 2008) is a former justice of the Iowa Supreme Court from August 19, 1980, to September 6, 1993, appointed from Johnson County, Iowa.

Born in Deep River, Iowa, to Martin and Esther Schultz, he served in the United States Navy during World War II, as a pharmacist mate 3rd class aboard the USS Benevolence and the USS President Adams. He graduated from Deep River High School in 1944, and attended Central College. He received an LL.B. from Drake University in 1949. He worked for Farm Bureau Insurance for a time, and entered the practice of law in Marengo, Iowa in 1956, serving as a county attorney from 1960 to 1968. He was a judge of the 6th Judicial District of Iowa from 1970 to August 19, 1980, when he was appointed to the Supreme Court.

Schultz died in his sleep from heart disease in his home in Williamsburg, Iowa, at the age of 80.

Political offices
Preceded by Warren J. Rees	Justice of the Iowa Supreme Court; 1980–1993	Succeeded by Marsha Ternus
