= John M. Grimm =

Iowa Supreme Court justice (1866–1943)

Justice of the Iowa Supreme Court
- In office February 1, 1929 – September 15, 1932

Personal details
- Born: December 21, 1866
- Died: December 22, 1943 (aged 77)

John M. Grimm (December 21, 1866 – December 22, 1943) was a justice of the Iowa Supreme Court from February 1, 1929, to September 15, 1932, appointed from Linn County, Iowa.

Political offices
Preceded by	Justice of the Iowa Supreme Court; 1929–1932	Succeeded by William L. Bliss
