= Bruce M. Snell Jr. =

American judge (1929–2019)

Justice of the Iowa Supreme Court
- In office October 8, 1987 – August 18, 2001
- Preceded by: Charles R. Wolle
- Succeeded by: Michael Streit

Personal details
- Born: August 18, 1929 Ida Grove, Iowa
- Died: December 20, 2019 (aged 90)

Bruce M. Snell Jr. (August 18, 1929 – December 20, 2019) was an American judge who served as a justice of the Iowa Supreme Court from 1987 to 2001.

Snell was born in Ida Grove, Iowa. He received a Bachelor of Arts from Grinnell College in 1951, and then served in the United States Army. He received a law degree from the University of Iowa College of Law in 1956, and was a law clerk to Judge Henry Norman Graven of the United States District Court for the Northern District of Iowa. Snell moved to New York City to practice law, later returning to Iowa and serving as assistant Iowa Attorney General. He practiced law in Ida Grove until 1976, when he was appointed to the Iowa Court of Appeals, where he remained until his appointment to the Iowa Supreme Court. He was a justice of the Iowa Supreme Court from October 8, 1987, to August 18, 2001.

His father was Bruce M. Snell Sr., who served on the Iowa Supreme Court from 1961 to 1970.

Political offices
Preceded by Charles R. Wolle	Justice of the Iowa Supreme Court; 1987–2001	Succeeded by Michael Streit
