= Gifford S. Robinson =

Iowa Supreme Court justice (1843–1936)

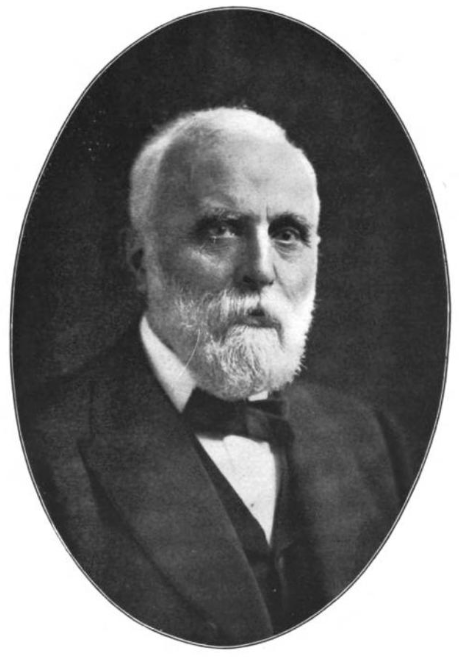

Justice of the Iowa Supreme Court
- In office January 1, 1888 – December 31, 1899
- Constituency: Buena Vista County

Member of the Iowa Senate
- In office 1882–1888

Member of the Iowa House of Representatives
- In office 1875–1877
- Constituency: 71st District

Personal details
- Born: May 28, 1843 Tremont, Illinois
- Died: May 28, 1936 (aged 93) West Okoboji Lake, Iowa
- Education: Illinois State Normal University; Washington University in St. Louis
- Occupation: Jurist, politician

Gifford Simeon Robinson (May 28, 1843 – May 28, 1936) was an American jurist and politician. He was a justice of the Iowa Supreme Court from January 1, 1888, to December 31, 1899, appointed from Buena Vista County.

== Biography ==
Gifford S. Robinson was born in Tremont, Illinois on May 28, 1843. He was educated at Illinois State Normal University and the Washington University School of Law in St. Louis.

During the Civil War, he enlisted with the 115th Illinois Infantry Regiment and fought in the battles of Franklin and Chickamauga. He was wounded in the latter, and was discharged. He moved to Iowa to practice law in 1870.

== Political career ==
Robinson was elected mayor of Storm Lake, Iowa, after which he won a seat in the Iowa House in 1875 and the Iowa Senate in 1881.

He was elected to the Iowa Supreme Court, serving from 1888 to 1899, and was chief justice for the 1892 session.

== Death ==
Gifford S. Robinson died at a cottage on West Okoboji Lake on May 28, 1936.

Political offices
Preceded by Austin Adams	Justice of the Iowa Supreme Court; 1888–1899	Succeeded by
