= Leon W. Powers =

Iowa Supreme Court justice (1888–1959)

Leon Powers
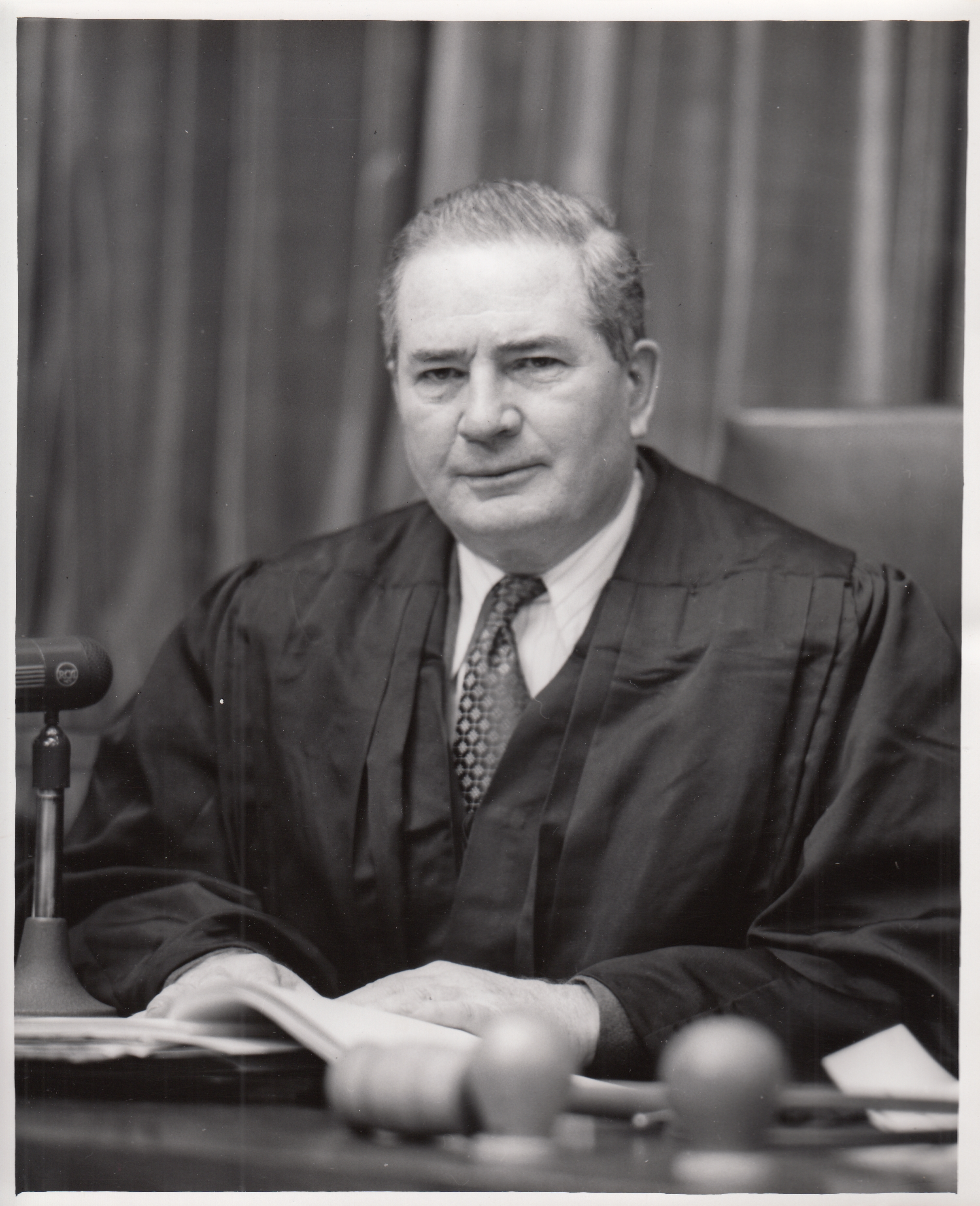

Justice of the Iowa Supreme Court
- In office 1934–1936

Personal details
- Born: June 12, 1888
- Died: January 7, 1959 (aged 70)

Judge Leon W. Powers (June 12, 1888 – January 7, 1959) from Iowa was one of three judges adjudicating the Ministries trial, the eleventh of the Subsequent Nuremberg Trials. In his dissenting summary on April 14, 1949, he wrote: "In my judgement, it is incorrect to say that all of the German people, except a few, participated in the persecution of the Jews, and it is incorrect to say that the Foreign Office knew of exterminations of the Jewish people, especially if by the term "Foreign Office", it is intended to imply that the Foreign Office defendants here had such knowledge. The evidence, in my opinion, falls far short of supporting any such a conclusion." From 1934 to 1936 he served on the Iowa Supreme Court.

Political offices
Preceded by George C. Claussen	Justice of the Iowa Supreme Court; 1934–1936	Succeeded by Carl B. Stiger
