= Francis H. Becker =

American judge in Iowa (1915–2011)

Francis Becker

Justice of the Iowa Supreme Court
- In office September 20, 1965 – March 31, 1972

Personal details
- Born: October 15, 1915
- Died: February 3, 2011 (aged 95) Bellingham, Washington
- Education: Saint Louis University; Washington University

Military service
- Branch: United States Army Air Corps
- Battles/wars: World War II

Francis H. Becker (October 15, 1915 – February 3, 2011) was a justice of the Iowa Supreme Court from September 20, 1965, to March 31, 1972, appointed from Dubuque County, Iowa.

Becker received an undergraduate degree from Saint Louis University in 1936 and a law degree from the Washington University in St. Louis, in 1939. He entered the practice of law in Dubuque, Iowa, which was interrupted by service in the United States Army Air Corps in World War II.

Becker died in Bellingham, Washington, at the age of 95.

Political offices
Preceded by Norman R. Hays	Justice of the Iowa Supreme Court; 1965–1972	Succeeded by Mark McCormick
