= Norman R. Hays =

American judge (1891–1966)

Norman Hays

Chief Justice of the Iowa Supreme Court
- In office July 1, 1957 – December 31, 1957
- Preceded by: William L. Bliss
- Succeeded by: Henry K. Peterson
- In office July 1, 1953 – December 31, 1953
- Preceded by: William A. Smith
- Succeeded by: William L. Bliss
- In office July 1, 1949 – December 31, 1949
- Preceded by: Oscar Hale
- Succeeded by: William L. Bliss

Associate Justice of the Iowa Supreme Court
- In office October 3, 1946 – August 31, 1965
- Preceded by: Frederic M. Miller
- Succeeded by: Francis H. Becker

Personal details
- Born: November 9, 1891
- Died: January 15, 1966 (aged 74)

Norman R. Hays (November 9, 1891 – January 15, 1966) was a justice of the Iowa Supreme Court from October 3, 1946, to August 31, 1965, appointed from Marion County, Iowa. He graduated from Grinnell College (1914) and Harvard Law School (1917).

Political offices
Preceded by Frederic M. Miller	Justice of the Iowa Supreme Court; 1946–1965	Succeeded by Francis H. Becker
