= Mary Newbury Adams =

American suffragist (1837–1901)

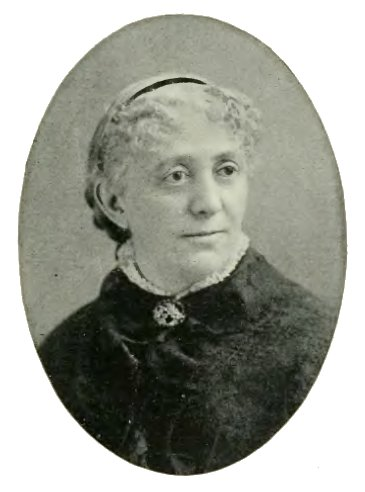
- Born: Mary Newbury; October 17, 1837; Peru, Indiana
- Died: August 5, 1901 (aged 63); Dubuque, Iowa
- Education: Troy Female Seminary
- Occupations: Suffragist, Social Advocate
- Spouse: Austin Adams
- Relatives: Eunice Gibbs Allyn (niece)

Mary Newbury Adams (October 17, 1837 – August 5, 1901) was an American women's suffragist and education advocate. She was a major social and political activist, and she helped found the Iowa Federation of Women's Clubs and the Northern Iowa Suffrage Association. Adams was inducted into the Iowa Women's Hall of Fame in 1981.

== Early life ==
Mary Newbury Adams was born in Peru, Indiana on October 17, 1837 to abolitionist missionaries Mary Ann Sergeant and Samuel Newbury. Her father was a Presbyterian minister and a supporter of co-education for men and women. Because her father held views of equal education for women and men, she received education beyond elementary school years.

Her parents were strong abolitionists, and their family was forced to move several times in search of a congregation with like-minded views. In her youth, Adams lived in Peru, Indiana, White Pigeon, Michigan, Cleveland, Ohio, and Jackson, Michigan. In Cleveland, Adams studied under the educator E.E. White. The family permanently settled in Dubuque, Iowa in 1853, though Adams was sent to the Troy Female Seminary in Troy, New York to complete her education.

== Public life and career ==
Adams was a passionate and lifelong learner, and she sought and created spaces of public discourse and education. Much of her work centered around the education and opportunities for women. She rejected the notion that women had to be defined by their roles of a daughter, sister, wife or a mother. She believed that women had played an essential role in the development of civilization and they were at par with men; she joined other feminists and suffragists to bring gender equality.

=== Conversational Club of Dubuque ===
In 1868 she established the Conversational Club of Dubuque, a study club that supported mutual education of its members on a wide range of subjects. Meetings were held in the homes of its members, which allowed women with young children to attend.

=== Association for the Advancement of Women ===
A number of similar clubs and organizations were being established across the country at this time, and in 1873, the Association for the Advancement of Women was founded by Maria Mitchell. These clubs were initiated with the purpose of coming together and educating one another on wide range of subjects but soon they turned to places where women were gaining the courage to speak before audiences and were getting confident to voice their opinions.

Adams, emboldened by her work organizing on a local level, became a vice president of the organization in 1875. In the following years, she became an active participant in the organization contributing papers to congresses and communicating with other local clubs that were being established.

=== Public speaking ===
Adams began taking public speaking engagements in 1867. The subject of her talks centered around the contributions and strength of women. She believed that in order for women to feel empowered they need to know the history of the contribution of women before them. In 1868 she delivered the commencement address at Lombard College, which may have been the first time a woman was invited to speak at any college commencement.

== Women's Rights Movement ==
In 1869, the Dubuque Times hired Adams to cover a women's suffrage meeting in Galena, Illinois run by Elizabeth Cady Stanton and Susan B. Anthony. She was impressed by the message and subsequently helped found the Northern Iowa Suffrage Association. Through the organization, Adams corresponded with other women in the state who were interested in suffrage. She also connected with the national movement, and became a council cabinet member of the National Council of Women. She continued to give public addresses and traveled extensively in the last years of her life, including at Stanton's 80th birthday celebration in New York City in 1895, the 1893 Columbian Exposition in Chicago, and at a meeting of the National American Women's Suffrage Association.

Adams, along with other women of the suffrage movement, laid the foundation from which sprouted a new generation of women who believed and fought for gender equality and the right to vote. Adams, during her earlier years in the movement was of the views that educating women was more important than giving them the right to vote as without education they will just be puppets in the hands of clergy, but her association with others of the suffrage movement, changed her views on the importance of right to vote and she began to believe that the right to vote was one's fundamental right. During her later years, she traveled extensively, spoke at meetings, and wrote greatly on equality.

== Personal life ==
Adams met Austin Adams, a lawyer and teacher, in 1853 in Dubuque, and the two agreed to be married after she finished her education at Troy Female Seminary. Austin Adams became a judge and eventually a chief justice of the Iowa Supreme Court. Together they had five children, four who survived: Annabel (b. 1858), Eugene (b. 1861), Herbart (b. 1863), and Cecilia (b. 1865).

== Death ==
Adams died of cancer in 1901 in Dubuque, Iowa. At her funeral, the minister took special notice of the Bible that was given to Adams by her father, and on the inside cover Adams had acknowledged the names of all the important women in both the Testaments.
