= Robert G. Allbee =

American judge (born 1928)

Robert Allbee

Associate Justice of the Iowa Supreme Court
- In office July 18, 1978 – June 30, 1982
- Preceded by: M. L. Mason
- Succeeded by: James H. Carter

Chief Judge of the Iowa Court of Appeals
- In office 1976 – July 18, 1978

Judge of Iowa Court of Appeals
- In office 1976 – July 18, 1978

Judge of the Iowa District Court for the 5th Judicial District
- In office 1975–1976

Personal details
- Born: December 14, 1928 (age 97) Muscatine, Iowa

Robert George Allbee (born December 14, 1928) is a former justice of the Iowa Supreme Court from July 18, 1978, to June 30, 1982, appointed from Polk County, Iowa.

== Life ==
He was born in Muscatine, Iowa on December 14, 1928. He attended Grinnell College from 1948-1950. He then graduated from Colorado College at Colorado Springs in 1952. In 1955 he was graduated from the Drake University Law School and began his law practice.

He was appointed Judge of the District Court for the Fifth Judicial District in 1975. He was appointed to the Court of Appeals in 1976, and was named as Chief Judge. He was appointed to the Iowa Supreme Court in 1978. He is a member of the American College of Trial Lawyers.

Political offices
Preceded by M. L. Mason	Justice of the Iowa Supreme Court; 1978–1982	Succeeded by James H. Carter
