= Horace E. Deemer =

American judge (1858–1917)

Horace Deemer

Chief Justice of the Iowa Supreme Court
- In office 1913 – February 23, 1917

Associate Justice of the Iowa Supreme Court
- In office May 8, 1894 – February 26, 1917

Personal details
- Born: September 24, 1858
- Died: February 26, 1917 (aged 58); Red Oak, Iowa, U.S.

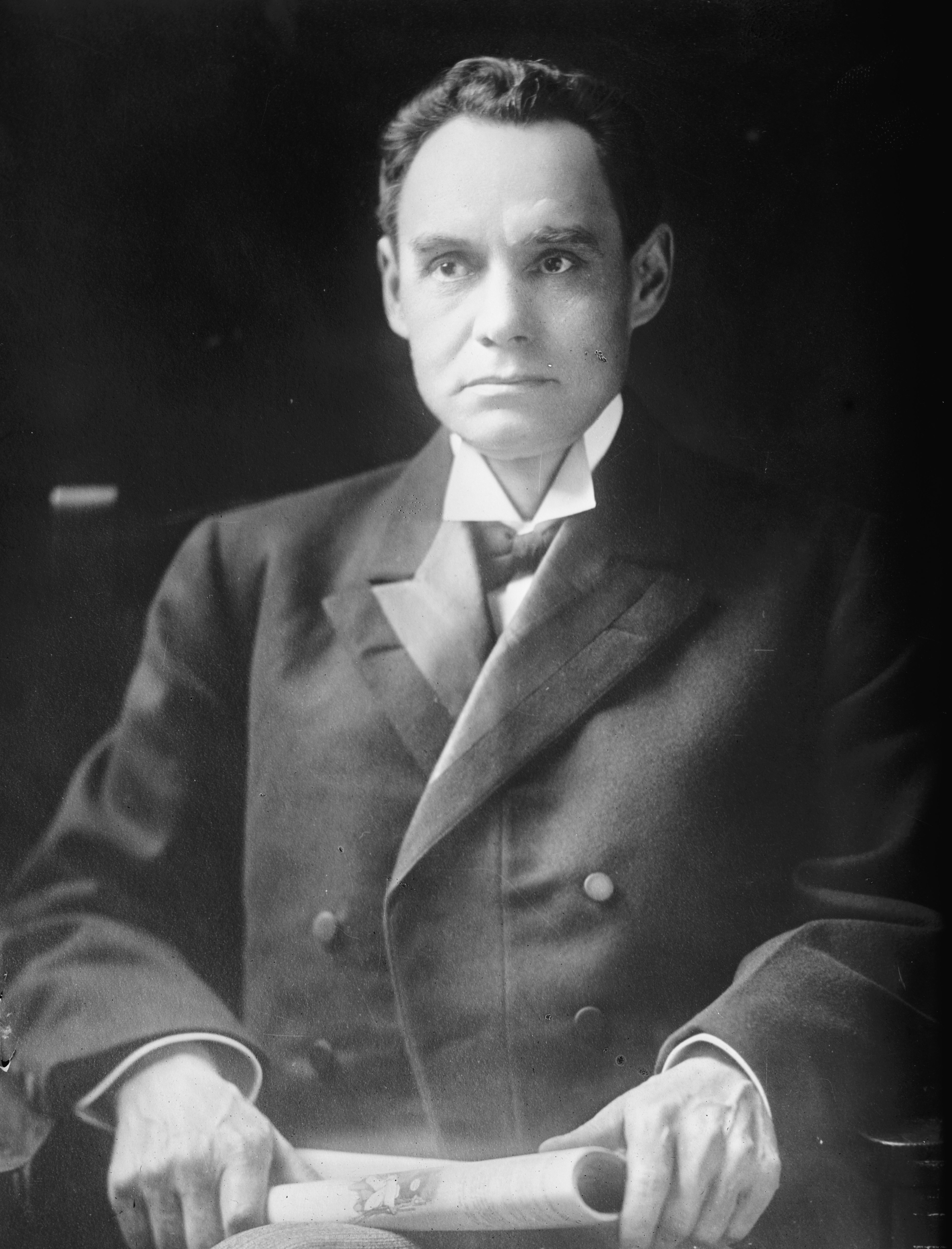
Horace E. Deemer

Horace Emerson Deemer (September 24, 1858 – February 26, 1917) was a justice of the Iowa Supreme Court from May 8, 1894, to February 26, 1917, appointed from Montgomery County, Iowa. His service included four years as chief justice.

Born in Bourbon, Marshall County, Indiana, Deemer was the eldest of six children. The family came to Iowa in 1866, settling on a farm near West Liberty, in Cedar County.

Deemer received his law degree from the University of Iowa in 1879, commencing the practice of law in Red Oak, Iowa. He was elected to a seat on the state district court in 1886, and was appointed to the Iowa Supreme Court on May 8, 1894, following passage of a law adding a sixth justice to the court. In 1911, Deemer's name was put forward as a candidate for appointment to the United States Senate, to a seat vacated by the death of Senator Lafayette Young, but William S. Kenyon was chosen instead. Deemer remained on the court thereafter until his death, in Red Oak, at the age of 66.

Political offices
Preceded by Newly established seat	Justice of the Iowa Supreme Court; 1894–1917	Succeeded by Truman S. Stevens
