= Halleck J. Mantz =

American judge (1877–1958)

Halleck Mantz

Chief Justice of the Iowa Supreme Court
- In office January 1, 1949 – June 30, 1949
- Preceded by: William A. Smith
- Succeeded by: Oscar Hale (Acting)
- In office July 1, 1944 – December 31, 1944
- Preceded by: William A. Smith
- Succeeded by: Oscar Hale

Associate Justice of the Iowa Supreme Court
- In office January 1, 1943 – January 1, 1953
- Preceded by: Carl B. Stiger

Personal details
- Born: September 23, 1877
- Died: November 14, 1958 (aged 81)

Halleck J. Mantz (September 23, 1877 – November 14, 1958) was a justice of the Iowa Supreme Court from January 1, 1943, to January 1, 1953, appointed from Audubon County, Iowa.

Political offices
Preceded by Carl B. Stiger	Justice of the Iowa Supreme Court; 1943–1953	Succeeded by
