= Charles Mason (Iowa judge) =

American judge

Chief Justice of the Iowa Territorial Supreme Court, later the Iowa Supreme Court
- In office July 4, 1838 – May 16, 1847
- Appointed by: Martin Van Buren
- Preceded by: Office established
- Succeeded by: Joseph Williams

Personal details
- Born: October 24, 1804 Pompey, New York
- Died: February 25, 1882 (aged 77) Burlington, Iowa
- Party: Democratic
- Education: United States Military Academy
- Occupation: Jurist, businessman

Charles Mason (October 24, 1804 – February 25, 1882) was born in Pompey, New York and became a patent attorney, taught engineering, and was the chief justice of the Iowa Territorial Supreme Court, from 1838 to 1846, and then became the first chief justice of the Iowa Supreme Court when Iowa was granted statehood, from 1846 to 1847.

However, today Mason is perhaps most remembered as the cadet who graduated first in the class of 1829 at the United States Military Academy at West Point, ahead of future Confederate Army commander Robert E. Lee. Mason and Lee were tied for the head of the class in Artillery, Tactics, and Conduct, but Mason bested Lee in all other subjects and graduated with an overall score of 1,995.5 points out of a possible 2,000, compared to Lee's 1,966.5. Mason resigned his commission in 1831, two years after graduation.

Mason and Lee also still have the two highest graduation point scores in the history of West Point. The third highest score in the Academy's history is held by Douglas MacArthur.

Later, Mason was president of the Burlington and Missouri River Railroad, from 1852 to 1853, and United States Commissioner of Patents, from 1853 to 1857. During his twice interrupted (he submitted his resignation three times 1853-7) tenure as Commissioner of Patents, Mason instituted a heretofore rare experiment in workplace diversity. He hired several women, among them Clara Barton, to work as equals to their male counterparts.

He was the Democratic candidate for Governor of Iowa in 1867, but was defeated by Samuel Merrill.

Mason was a patron of the painter George Henry Yewell.

Charles Mason died in Burlington, Iowa on February 25, 1882.

Party political offices
Preceded by Thomas H. Benton	Democratic nominee for Governor of Iowa; 1867	Succeeded by George Gillespie
Political offices
Preceded by	Justice of the Iowa Supreme Court; 1846–1847	Succeeded by
