= Austin Adams (lawyer) =

American judge (1826–1890)

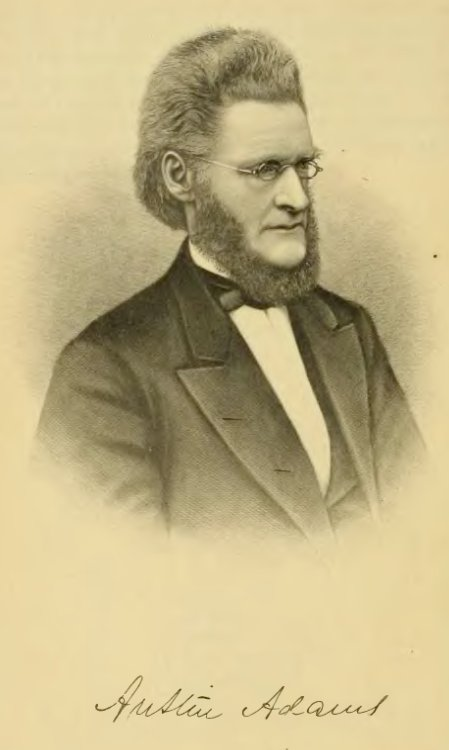

Chief Justice of the Iowa Supreme Court
- In office 1886–1887
- In office 1880–1881

Associate Justice of the Iowa Supreme Court
- In office January 1, 1876 – December 31, 1887
- Preceded by: William E. Miller
- Succeeded by: Gifford S. Robinson

Personal details
- Born: May 24, 1826 Andover, Vermont
- Died: October 17, 1890 (aged 64) Dubuque, Iowa
- Resting place: Linwood Cemetery in Dubuque, Iowa
- Citizenship: American
- Spouse: Mary Newbury Adams
- Parents: Jeremiah Adams (father); Dorcas Austin (mother)
- Relatives: Governor John J. Bagley (brother-in-law), Presidents John Adams and John Quincy Adams (distant cousins)
- Education: Dartmouth College, Harvard Law School
- Occupation: lawyer, judge

Austin Adams (May 24, 1826 – October 17, 1890) was an American lawyer and justice of the Iowa Supreme Court for twelve years.

== Heritage ==
Austin Adam's ancestors lived in Essex, England. Henry Adams, his 5x Greats-Grandfather, emigrated to Massachusetts in 1632 with his wife and children. His descendant include great-great-grandson Massachusetts Governor Samuel Adams; great-great-grandson President John Adams and 3x greats-grandson President John Quincy Adams. Presidents John Adams and John Quincy Adams are his 3rd cousin 3 times removed and 3rd cousin 4 times removed, respectively.

Austin's father, Jeremiah Adams, was a successful farmer, clerk of the school district, and served twice in the state legislature. He was a captain in the War of 1812. Jeremiah's father, Jonas, was a Lieutenant in the Revolutionary War.

== Youth ==
Austin Adams was born on May 24, 1826, in Andover, Vermont, a country village, son of Captain Jerry Adams and Dorcas Austin, grandson of Corporal Jonas Adams and Phebe How, and a direct descendant from Henry Adams, of Braintree, 1636. His grandparents had secured that school and a church on a corner of their farm in 1794. He retained pleasant memories of the district school, which he attended until he was fourteen. In later years he wrote "[The] older pupils, the young men and women [...] not only assisted me in my studies, but their presence and example afforded me inspiration." His family attended the Baptist church on their farm. Adams heard only "dogmatic and terrorizing theology" at the church and it "succeeded in destroying much of the happiness of his childhood."

He showed great interest in law as a boy: "The law had a perfect fascination for me before I was ten years old, and I think before I ever saw a lawyer or a court." He often went to the court house in Woodstock, Vermont to listen to cases.

At age thirteen, his teacher urged his father to give Austin a better education than he could receive at the country school house. At fourteen he was sent to Black River Academy in Ludlow, Vermont, to prepare for college. At age sixteen he began teaching students at the academy, some of whom were older than he was, in the winter while working on his father's farm in the summer.

At nineteen he entered the sophomore class at Dartmouth College; he graduated in 1848, receiving his A.M. degree in course. Lighting then was so poor that he lost some of his vision studying, and had to wear spectacles at an early age. "The physical inability to see distinctly increased an introspective state of mind and somewhat blunted the observing powers which he himself regretted."

For the next five years he taught at West Randolph Academy in West Randolph, Vermont, while pursuing his legal studies. Teaching at the academy "perfect[ed] his classical studies." He attended Harvard Law School for a short time in 1853. He was admitted to the bar in Woodstock, Vermont, in January 1853 and entered practice with ex-Governor Carlos Coolidge.

== Dubuque, Iowa ==
When Adams decided to move west, his friends believed that it wouldn't suit him and that he would return early. Despite this, he settled in Dubuque, Iowa in July 1854. "The evening he reached Dubuque [...] he felt that here was to be his life's work." He resided in Dubuque for the rest of his life. Later in life, he said: "I wanted more liberty, a society with more variety than I had ever seen in the East."

After arriving in Dubuque, he began to practice law there.

Like many at the time, he was drawn to seemingly-profitable real-estate investments, and he suffered when their value dropped in the Panic of 1857. He was so affected by this loss that when he was seventy and a friend offered him a share in a promising real-estate investment, he declined, saying "No, I have already had all the profits of real-estate transactions I can afford."

Adams was instrumental in promoting education in Dubuque; he opened an academy, one of the first institutes of secondary education in Dubuque, and taught with Mary Mann, wife of Horace Mann, for six months. During the winter of 1854 he proposed building a public library; he raised funds for it with a series of lectures and solicited donations of books from private libraries.

He actively supported John C. Frémont's campaign for president in 1856. While he didn't naturally like politics, he was strongly committed to early Republican principles.

He helped to organize a YMCA in Dubuque in 1857. For three years he had a Bible class, while a member and a trustee of the Congregational church, and for two years in the Universalist church. One year he had evenings devoted to the study of physical science at YMCA. He had the subject of geology, and "unrolled the gospel of the storied world to the youth gathered there."

In 1858, after listening to the Lincoln-Douglas debates in Galena, Illinois, he said of Lincoln:

I have heard the greatest man I have ever listened to; he ought to be our next president.

During the American Civil War in 1864, he was secretary of the Sanitary Fair for three months to raise funds for the hospital.

In December 1865, he and ten other gentlemen formed a literary club called "The Round Table". They obtained a room and furnished it with a round table that could fit fifteen people around it. Wendell Phillips and Ralph Waldo Emerson visited it while they were in Dubuque. They were impressed, and later told their friends in Boston about their "find in the West."

He was president of the Iowa State University (ISU) board of education, 1868, trustee of the university from 1871 to 1877, and lecturer in its law department, from 1875 until his death.

== Iowa Supreme Court ==
Adams had built up an excellent reputation in the 1860s, so when he was chosen to be a justice of the Iowa Supreme Court, from 1876 to 1880, the choice was welcomed with widespread approval. He began his term on the Iowa Supreme Court on January 1, 1876, leaving the firm of Adams, Robison & Lacy. He was chief justice for four years, from 1880 to 1881 and 1886–87. He was the first Chief Justice to admit a woman to practice in the Iowa Supreme Court. He later commended her for the way she tried the case. As a justice he slowly came to conclusions but then always stood by them. He never tried to appeal to popular opinion in cases. In June 1886 he presided over the opening of the new Supreme Court Rooms. His second term ended December 31, 1887, and he decided not to accept another term.

His decisions can be found in Volumes 42–73 of the Iowa Reports.

In 1883, Dartmouth honored him with an LL.D. degree.

== Personal life ==
On September 8, 1857, Austin Adams married Mary K. Newbury, second daughter of Samuel Newbury and Mary Sergeant. Mary Newbury Adams supported the advancement of women and was a member of many progressive and scientific organizations. Austin also enthusiastically supported the advancement of women, particularly women's education.

He enjoyed reading literature as recreation. He usually only read parts of a book—the rest he felt was unneeded.

All biographies praise his personal qualities, calling him a simple, considerate, intelligent man.

== Later life ==
During the last year of his life, he became fascinated with the natural world. "This year, he more than once said, was the happiest of his life, sustained and soothed by an unfaltering trust in the order and law of the universe." He remained strong mentally until his final hours: he usually read five to six hours a day.

Suffering a prolonged illness, he died at four in the morning in his home in Dubuque, Iowa, on October 17, 1890. He was buried in Linwood Cemetery in Dubuque, Iowa.

His wife later wrote: "His happiness was in the state of his mind, not exterior conditions. [...] He had that peace, that passeth understanding."

== Sources ==
- Adams, Mary Newbury (April 1891). "Austin Adams" . The Iowa Historical Record. 7 (2): 49–70.
- Gue, Benjamin F. (1903). "Austin Adams" . History of Iowa From the Earliest Times to the Beginning of the Twentieth Century . Vol. 4. New York: The Century History Company. pp. 1–2. OCLC 11582449.
- Iowa Judicial Branch,
- Iowa Reports, Volume 81, "In Memoriam, Austin Adams", pp. viii-xvi

Political offices
Preceded by William E. Miller	Justice of the Iowa Supreme Court; 1876–1887	Succeeded by Gifford S. Robinson
