= Carl B. Stiger =

Iowa Supreme Court justice (1883–1977)

Carl Stiger

Justice of the Iowa Supreme Court
- In office February 15, 1936 – December 31, 1942

Personal details
- Born: February 21, 1883
- Died: August 22, 1977 (aged 94)

Carl B. Stiger (February 21, 1883 – August 22, 1977) was a justice of the Iowa Supreme Court from February 15, 1936, to December 31, 1942. He was appointed from Tama County, Iowa.

Political offices
Preceded by Leon W. Powers	Justice of the Iowa Supreme Court; 1936–1942	Succeeded by Halleck J. Mantz
