= John Sherwin (judge) =

Iowa Supreme Court Justice (1851–1919)

Chief Justice of the Iowa Supreme Court
- In office 1904–1906

Associate Justice of the Iowa Supreme Court
- In office January 1, 1900 – December 31, 1912

Judge of Iowa's 12th Judicial District Court
- In office 1888 – January 1, 1900
- Appointed by: William Larrabee

District Attorney of Iowa's 12th Judicial District Court
- In office 1884–1885

Mayor of Mason City, Iowa
- In office 1884–1885

Personal details
- Born: February 6, 1851 Berlin, Ohio, U.S.
- Died: February 3, 1919 (aged 67) Mason City, Iowa, U.S.

John Collins Sherwin (February 6, 1851 – February 3, 1919) served as a justice of the Iowa Supreme Court from January 1, 1900, until December 31, 1912. He was chief justice for two years.

== Early life ==
He was born in Berlin, Ohio. Shortly after his birth his parents moved with him to LaCrosse, Wisconsin. He attended Ripon and Beloit Colleges in Wisconsin.

== Legal, political and judicial career ==
In June 1875, he graduated from University of Wisconsin Law School. A year later he moved to Mason City, Iowa, beginning his law practice and starting his career in public office.

In 1884, he became mayor of Mason City, serving until 1885. He was then elected District Attorney of Iowa's 12th Judicial District.

In September 1888, he was appointed by Governor William Larrabee to be a judge in the Iowa's 12th Judicial District Court. He was reelected continually until 1900, when he joined the state Supreme Court. He was on the Supreme Court for 12 years from 1900 to 1912, with a 2-year stint as chief justice.

Political offices
Preceded by	Justice of the Iowa Supreme Court; 1900–1912	Succeeded by
