= Joseph M. Beck =

American judge (1823–1893)

Joseph Beck

Justice of the Iowa Supreme Court
- In office January 1, 1868 – December 31, 1891

Personal details
- Born: April 21, 1823
- Died: May 30, 1893 (aged 70)

Joseph M. Beck (April 21, 1823 – May 30, 1893) was a justice of the Iowa Supreme Court from January 1, 1868, to December 31, 1891, appointed from Lee County, Iowa.

Political offices
Preceded by	Justice of the Iowa Supreme Court; 1868–1891	Succeeded by
