= T. Eugene Thornton =

American judge (1911–1967)

Eugene Thornton

Justice of the Iowa Supreme Court
- In office January 1, 1959 – May 9, 1967

Personal details
- Born: June 17, 1911
- Died: May 9, 1967 (aged 55)

T. Eugene Thornton (June 17, 1911 – May 9, 1967) was a justice of the Iowa Supreme Court from January 1, 1959, to May 9, 1967, appointed from Black Hawk County, Iowa.

Political offices
Preceded by	Justice of the Iowa Supreme Court; 1959–1967	Succeeded by
