= Warren J. Rees =

Iowa Supreme Court justice (1908–1988)

Warren Rees

Justice of the Iowa Supreme Court
- In office November 13, 1969 – August 2, 1980

Personal details
- Born: August 2, 1908 Anamosa, Iowa
- Died: November 20, 1988 (aged 80) Anamosa, Iowa

Warren J. Rees (August 2, 1908 – 1988) was a justice of the Iowa Supreme Court from November 13, 1969, to August 2, 1980, appointed from Jones County, Iowa.

Political offices
Preceded by	Justice of the Iowa Supreme Court; 1969–1980	Succeeded by
