= Charles R. Wolle =

American judge (1935–2022)

Senior Judge of the United States District Court for the Southern District of Iowa
- In office October 16, 2001 – December 6, 2022

Chief Judge of the United States District Court for the Southern District of Iowa
- In office 1992–2001
- Preceded by: Harold Duane Vietor
- Succeeded by: Ronald Earl Longstaff

Judge of the United States District Court for the Southern District of Iowa
- In office August 6, 1987 – October 16, 2001
- Appointed by: Ronald Reagan
- Preceded by: William Corwin Stuart
- Succeeded by: James E. Gritzner

Associate Justice of the Iowa Supreme Court
- In office March 11, 1983 – August 12, 1987
- Appointed by: Terry Branstad
- Preceded by: Clay LeGrand
- Succeeded by: James H. Andreasen

Personal details
- Born: Charles Robert Wolle; October 16, 1935 Sioux City, Iowa, U.S.
- Died: December 6, 2022 (aged 87) Westminster, Colorado, U.S.
- Education: Harvard College (AB); University of Iowa (JD)

Charles Robert Wolle (October 16, 1935 – December 6, 2022) was an American jurist who served as a justice of the Iowa Supreme Court from 1983 to 1987, and as a federal judge of the United States District Court for the Southern District of Iowa from 1987 until his death.

== Education ==
Born in Sioux City, Iowa, Wolle received a Bachelor of Arts from Harvard College in 1959, and a Juris Doctor from the University of Iowa College of Law in 1961. His brother, William D. Wolle, served as the American ambassador to Bahrain, Oman, and the United Arab Emirates.

== Legal and state judicial career ==
Wolle was in private practice in Sioux City from 1961 to 1980, practicing at Shull, Marshall, Mayne, Marks & Vizintos, where his mentor was future congressman Wiley Mayne. He practiced civil litigation and labor law. He also served as a Reserve Sergeant in the United States Army from 1961 to 1967.

He was a judge of the Iowa District Court for the Third Judicial District, from 1981 to 1983, nominated by Robert D. Ray. He became a justice of the Iowa Supreme Court on March 11, 1983, serving until August 12, 1987. During that time, he chaired the committee that drafted the Iowa Rules of Evidence. He also became a member of the faculty of the National Judicial College in 1983.

== Federal judicial service ==
On July 1, 1987, Wolle was nominated by President Ronald Reagan to a seat on the United States District Court for the Southern District of Iowa that was vacated when Judge William Corwin Stuart assumed senior status. Wolle was nominated on the recommendation of Chuck Grassley. Wolle was confirmed by the United States Senate on August 5, 1987, and received his commission on August 6, 1987. He served as Chief Judge of the Southern District from 1992 to 2001. Wolle assumed senior status on October 16, 2001, and continued actively hearing cases until December 2, 2021.

Wolle also regularly sat with the United States District Court for the Eastern District of New York. Wolle would split time between Douglas County, Nevada and Iowa and sat with the United States District Court for the District of Nevada and the United States Court of Appeals for the Ninth Circuit. As a judge, Wolle was known for emphasizing terse and concise judicial opinions. Wolle died on December 6, 2022, in Westminster, Colorado.

== Sources ==
Legal offices
Preceded by William Corwin Stuart	Judge of the United States District Court for the Southern District of Iowa; 1987–2001	Succeeded by James E. Gritzner
Preceded by Harold Duane Vietor	Chief Judge of the United States District Court for the Southern District of Iowa; 1992–2001	Succeeded by Ronald Earl Longstaff
