= Bruce M. Snell =

American judge (1895–1976)

Bruce Snell Sr.

Justice of the Iowa Supreme Court
- In office January 1, 1961 – March 4, 1970

Personal details
- Born: March 4, 1895
- Died: September 23, 1976 (aged 81)

Bruce M. Snell (March 4, 1895 – September 23, 1976) was an American jurist who served as a justice of the Iowa Supreme Court from January 1, 1961, to March 4, 1970, appointed from Ida County, Iowa.

His son, Bruce M. Snell Jr., also served on the Iowa Supreme Court.

Political offices
Preceded by Harry F. Garrett	Justice of the Iowa Supreme Court; 1961–1970	Succeeded by Harvey Uhlenhopp
