= John W. Kintzinger =

Iowa Supreme Court justice (1870–1946)

Justice of the Iowa Supreme Court
- In office January 1, 1933 – December 31, 1938

Personal details
- Born: August 12, 1870
- Died: April 3, 1946 (aged 75)

John W. Kintzinger (August 12, 1870 – April 3, 1946) was a justice of the Iowa Supreme Court from January 1, 1933, to December 31, 1938, appointed from Dubuque County, Iowa.

Political offices
Preceded by	Justice of the Iowa Supreme Court; 1933–1938	Succeeded by Frederic M. Miller
