= Thomas Arthur (Iowa judge) =

American judge (1860–1925)

Justice of the Iowa Supreme Court
- In office September 15, 1920 – September 15, 1925

Personal details
- Born: July 12, 1860 Harrison County, Iowa, U.S.
- Died: September 15, 1925 (aged 65) Des Moines, Iowa, U.S.
- Party: Republican
- Education: State University of Iowa
- Profession: Judge

Thomas Arthur (July 12, 1860 – September 15, 1925) was a justice of the Iowa Supreme Court from September 15, 1920, until his death on September 15, 1925, appointed from Harrison County, Iowa.

Born on a farm in Harrison County, Iowa, Arthur attended rural schools and received his law degree from the University of Iowa in 1881. A Republican, Arthur served as a district court judge from 1911 to 1920, when he was appointed to the supreme court.

Arthur died at Iowa Methodist Hospital at the age of 65, following a heart attack in his office that morning.

Political offices
Preceded by Frank R. Gaynor	Justice of the Iowa Supreme Court; 1920–1925	Succeeded by Edgar A. Morling
