= Greenbrier, Virginia =

Greenbrier
- Unincorporated community
- Location within the Commonwealth of Virginia Greenbrier (the United States)
- Coordinates: 36°46′48″N 76°13′40″W
- Country: United States
- State: Virginia
- Independent city: Chesapeake
- Time zone: UTC−5 (Eastern (EST))
  - Summer (DST): UTC−4 (EDT)

Greenbrier is a community located in the independent city of Chesapeake, Virginia, United States. It is made up of two sections, Greenbrier East and Greenbrier West. Greenbrier Parkway, a major road in Greenbrier, is the commercial hub of Chesapeake. Shopping centers line this major road, including Greenbrier Mall. Another major road, Volvo Parkway, cuts across Greenbrier Parkway. This road leads to the more residential section of Greenbrier along Battlefield Boulevard as well as another shopping center.

Elizabeth Rolfe was born here in 1620 to English colonist John Rolfe and his third wife, Jane Pierce. Two years later, Jane married Captain Roger Smith after Rolfe's death. Elizabeth was married to John Milner of Nansemond until her death in 1635.

== Public schools ==
Greenbrier public schools include Greenbrier Primary, Greenbrier Intermediate, and Greenbrier Middle School.

Students who live in Greenbrier attend Indian River High School or Oscar Smith High School.

== Notables ==
- Greenbrier is home to the headquarters of the nationwide store, Dollar Tree.
- Greenbrier is home to the Call Center of the nationwide shopping channel QVC.
- Greenbrier is also home to Greenbrier Mall (not to be confused with Atlanta's Greenbriar Mall).
- Chesapeake City Park hosts Chesapeake's yearly Jubilee .
- Greenbrier Public Library, a branch of the Chesapeake Public Library, is located in Greenbrier
