= W. Ward Reynoldson =

American judge (1920–2016)

Ward Reynoldson

Chief Justice of the Iowa Supreme Court
- In office August 3, 1978 – October 1, 1987
- Preceded by: C. Edwin Moore
- Succeeded by: Arthur A. McGiverin

Associate Justice of the Iowa Supreme Court
- In office May 1, 1971 – October 1, 1987
- Preceded by: Robert L. Larson
- Succeeded by: James H. Andreasen

Personal details
- Born: May 17, 1920 St. Edward, Nebraska, U.S.
- Died: March 28, 2016 (aged 95) Des Moines, Iowa
- Spouse(s): Janet Mills (m. 1942; died 1986) Patricia Frey (m. 1989)
- Children: 2

Walter Ward Reynoldson (May 17, 1920 – March 28, 2016) was an American lawyer and judge who served as Associate Justice and Chief Justice on the Iowa Supreme Court.

== Early life ==
He was born in 1920 to Walter S. and Mable (Sallach) Reynoldson the family farm near St. Edward, Nebraska and had two sisters. He graduated from Wayne State College, in Wayne, Nebraska, in 1942. He then joined the Navy during WWII in 1942 until 1946, when he went to University of Iowa Law School and graduated with his JD in 1948, graduating with the Order of the Coif.

== Legal and Judicial Career ==
After law school, he started practicing in Osceola from 1948 to 1971. During that time, he served as the county attorney for Clarke County, Iowa from 1953 to 1957. He was appointed to be an Associate Justice in 1971 by Governor Robert D. Ray. He remained an Associate Justice until 1978, when he was elevated to Chief Justice of the Iowa Supreme Court. In that role, he facilitated a pilot program to allow cameras in the courtroom.

== Personal life ==
In 1942, he married Janet Mills. They have 2 children. Janet died in 1986. He remarried to Patricia Frey in 1989.

Political offices
Preceded by Robert L. Larson	Justice of the Iowa Supreme Court; 1971–1987	Succeeded by James H. Andreasen
