= William Corwin Stuart =

American judge (1920–2010)

Senior Judge of the United States District Court for the Southern District of Iowa
- In office April 30, 1986 – August 12, 2010

Chief Judge of the United States District Court for the Southern District of Iowa
- In office 1977–1985
- Preceded by: William Cook Hanson
- Succeeded by: Harold Duane Vietor

Judge of the United States District Court for the Southern District of Iowa
- In office November 1, 1971 – April 30, 1986
- Appointed by: Richard Nixon
- Preceded by: Roy Laverne Stephenson
- Succeeded by: Charles R. Wolle

Justice of the Iowa Supreme Court
- In office October 15, 1962 – November 8, 1971

Personal details
- Born: William Corwin Stuart; April 28, 1920 Knoxville, Iowa, U.S.
- Died: August 12, 2010 (aged 90) Chariton, Iowa, U.S.
- Education: University of Iowa (BA, JD)

Military service
- Branch/service: United States Navy
- Battles/wars: World War II

William Corwin Stuart (April 28, 1920 – August 12, 2010) was an American attorney, politician, and jurist who served as a justice of the Iowa Supreme Court, and United States district judge of the United States District Court for the Southern District of Iowa.

== Early life and education ==
Born in Knoxville, Iowa, Stuart received a Bachelor of Arts degree from the University of Iowa in 1941, followed by a Juris Doctor from the University of Iowa College of Law in 1942. He was a Lieutenant in the United States Naval Air Corps during World War II, serving from 1943 to 1945.

== Career ==
Stuart operated a private legal practice in Chariton, Iowa, from 1946 to 1962, serving as a city attorney of Chariton from 1947 to 1949. He was a member of the Iowa Senate from 1953 to 1961. He became a justice of the Iowa Supreme Court on October 15, 1962, serving until he resigned November 8, 1971, following his appointment to the federal bench.

On October 13, 1971, Stuart was nominated by President Richard Nixon to a seat on the United States District Court for the Southern District of Iowa vacated by Judge Roy Laverne Stephenson. Stuart was confirmed by the United States Senate on October 28, 1971, and received his commission on November 1, 1971. He served as Chief Judge from 1977 to 1985, assuming senior status on April 30, 1986.

== Death ==
Stuart died in Chariton on August 12, 2010, at the age of 90.

Legal offices
Preceded by Ralph A. Oliver	Associate Justice of the Iowa Supreme Court; 1962–1971	Succeeded by K. David Harris
Preceded by Roy Laverne Stephenson	Judge of the United States District Court for the Southern District of Iowa; 1971–1986	Succeeded by Charles R. Wolle
Preceded by William Cook Hanson	Chief Judge of the United States District Court for the Southern District of Iowa; 1977–1985	Succeeded by Harold Duane Vietor
