= William E. Miller (Iowa judge) =

American judge (1823–1897)

Justice of the Iowa Supreme Court
- In office September 14, 1870 – December 31, 1875
- Preceded by: Elias Hewitt Williams
- Succeeded by: Austin Adams

Personal details
- Born: October 18, 1823 Westmoreland County, Pennsylvania
- Died: November 8, 1897 (aged 74) Des Moines, Iowa
- Party: Republican
- Spouse: Mary Robinson (m. 1844)
- Children: 8

Military service
- Allegiance: Union army
- Years of service: 1862–1863
- Rank: Colonel
- Commands: 28th Iowa Infantry Regiment

William Edward Miller (October 18, 1823 – November 8, 1897) was a justice of the Iowa Supreme Court from September 14, 1870, to December 31, 1875, having been appointed from Johnson County, Iowa.

== Early life, education, and career ==
Born in Westmoreland County, Pennsylvania, Miller studied law in 1846 while working as molder in his father's foundry to support his family. In 1850, he was elected a justice of the peace, and in 1852 he moved to Iowa City, Iowa. There he became a reporter and continued his studies, gaining admission to the bar in 1853.

In 1854 he was elected prosecuting attorney for Johnson County, Iowa, the only Republican elected. He served for two terms and then engaged In the general practice of law. He was nominated by the Republican party for a seat in the state legislature in 1857. In the following years he was elected judge of the Eighth district, comprising Benton, Cedar, Iowa, Johnson, Jones, Linn, and Tama counties.

== Military service and later judicial service ==
In 1862, Miller retired from the bench to become a colonel in the 28th Iowa Infantry Regiment then organised at Camp Pope, near Iowa City. For two months he was engaged in drilling recruits, and in November of that year marched through Missouri to an encampment at Helena, Arkansas. The regiment engaged in various expeditions, but Miller "contracted a disease which meant death in the South", which forced him to return to Iowa in March 1863.

In 1864, Miller began writing law books, beginning with A Treatise on Pleading and Practice in Actions and Special Proceedings at Law and Equity in the Court of Iowa Under the Revision of 1860. He was appointed to a vacancy on the state supreme court in 1869, and elected to the court the following year, serving for part of his term as chief justice. He taught in the law department of the University of Iowa from 1871 to 1875, relocating to Des Moines, Iowa, where he remained until his death.

== Personal life and death ==
On August 1, 1844, Miller married Mary Robinson of Fayette County, Pennsylvania, with whom he had eight children. Miller had a stroke in 1887, and was an invalid thereafter. He died at the Christian sanitarium in Des Moines at the age of 74, with his wife at his side.

Political offices
| Preceded by Elias Hewitt Williams | Justice of the Iowa Supreme Court; 1870–1875 | Succeeded by Austin Adams |
