= Norman W. Isbell =

Iowa Supreme Court justice (1818–1865)

Norman Isbell

Justice of the Iowa Supreme Court
- In office January 16, 1855 – June 2, 1856

Personal details
- Born: April 7, 1818 Charlton, New York
- Died: March 10, 1865 (aged 46) Napa, California

Norman W. Isbell (April 7, 1818 – March 10, 1865) was a justice of the Iowa Supreme Court from January 16, 1855, to June 2, 1856, appointed from Linn County, Iowa.

Born in Charlton, New York, Isbell read law to be admitted to the bar in 1839. He moved west due to poor health, first to Keytesville, Missouri in 1842, and later to Marion, Iowa in 1845.

After a short stint on the Supreme Court, his health forced him to resign. He later served briefly as a Linn County District Court judge, from 1862 to 1864, where he controversially ruled that Iowans stationed in other states while serving as soldiers in the American Civil War could not constitutionally vote in the state's elections. In 1864, he moved to California, where he resided until his death, in Napa, California.

Political offices
Preceded by Jonathan C. Hall	Justice of the Iowa Supreme Court; 1855–1856	Succeeded by
