= K. David Harris =

Iowa Supreme Court justice (1927–2010)

David Harris

Justice of the Iowa Supreme Court
- In office January 11, 1972 – July 29, 1999

Personal details
- Born: July 29, 1927 Jefferson, Iowa
- Died: June 27, 2010 (aged 82) Jefferson, Iowa

Military service
- Branch: United States Army
- Years of service: 1945
- Unit: 7th Infantry Division
- Battles/wars: World War II; Pacific Theater

K. David Harris (July 29, 1927 – June 27, 2010) was a justice of the Iowa Supreme Court from January 11, 1972, to July 29, 1999, appointed from Greene County, Iowa.

Born in Jefferson, Iowa, Harris graduated from Jefferson High School in 1945 and immediately entered the United States Army, serving in the 7th Infantry Division in the Pacific Theatre of World War II. He received a bachelor's degree from the University of Iowa in 1949, and a law degree from the same institution in 1951.

In 1962, Governor Norman A. Erbe appointed Harris to a seat on the Iowa District Court, and in 1972, Governor Robert D. Ray elevated Harris to a seat on the state supreme court.

== Personal life and death ==
In 1948, Harris married Madonna Coyne, with whom he had two daughters and a son. He died in Jefferson at the age of 82.

Political offices
Preceded by William Corwin Stuart	Justice of the Iowa Supreme Court; 1972–1999	Succeeded by
