= Truman S. Stevens =

Iowa Supreme Court justice (1867–1950)

Truman Stevens

Justice of the Iowa Supreme Court
- In office May 1, 1917 – December 31, 1934

Personal details
- Born: December 20, 1867
- Died: August 19, 1950 (aged 82)

Truman S. Stevens (December 20, 1867 – August 19, 1950) was a justice of the Iowa Supreme Court from May 1, 1917, to December 31, 1934, appointed from Fremont County, Iowa.

Political offices
Preceded by Horace E. Deemer	Justice of the Iowa Supreme Court; 1917–1934	Succeeded by Court substantially remade
