= Charles A. Bishop =

American judge

Charles Alvord Bishop (May 22, 1854 – July 9, 1908) was a politician and jurist in the State of Iowa.

== Biography ==
Bishop was born on May 22, 1854, to Roxana and Matthew Patrick Bishop in Waukesha County, Wisconsin. He married twice: first, on November 2, 1873, to Della M. Dow, who died in 1900, and second, on June 24, 1902, to Alice S. Lyman. He died in 1908.

== Career ==
Bishop served in the Iowa House of Representatives in 1882. He served as a judge in the district court of Iowa from 1889 to 1890 and from 1895 to 1902. From 1902 to 1908 he was a justice of the Iowa Supreme Court.

Political offices
Preceded by	Justice of the Iowa Supreme Court; 1902–1908	Succeeded by
