= Jerry L. Larson =

American judge (1936–2018)

Jerry Larson

Associate Justice of the Iowa Supreme Court
- In office 1978–2008

Iowa District Court Judge
- In office 1975–1978

Shelby County Attorney
- In office 1965–1970

Personal details
- Born: May 17, 1936 Harlan, Iowa, U.S.
- Died: April 25, 2018 (aged 81) Harlan, Iowa, U.S.
- Education: University of Iowa (BA, LLB)

Jerry Leroy Larson (May 17, 1936 – April 25, 2018) was an American judge who served as an associate justice of the Iowa Supreme Court from 1978 to 2008.

== Background ==
Larson was born in Harlan, Iowa on May 17, 1936. He received his bachelor's and law degrees in 1958 and 1960 from the University of Iowa. Larson served as county attorney for Shelby County from 1965 to 1970. Larson then served as an Iowa District Court judge from 1975 to 1978. He died in Harlan on April 25, 2018, at the age of 81.

== Personal life ==
He is the father of Susan Christensen, Chief Justice of Iowa Supreme Court, & Jeffrey Larson, a judge of the Iowa Fourth Judicial District. He swore in his daughter in 2016 for District Judge in Shelby County.
