= Paul W. Richards (judge) =

Iowa Supreme Court justice (1874–1956)

Paul Richards

Associate Justice of the Iowa Supreme Court
- In office January 1, 1935 – December 31, 1940

Personal details
- Born: March 16, 1874
- Died: December 17, 1956 (aged 82)

Paul W. Richards (March 16, 1874 – December 17, 1956) was a justice of the Iowa Supreme Court from January 1, 1935, to December 31, 1940, appointed from Keokuk County, Iowa.

Political offices
Preceded by Court substantially remade	Justice of the Iowa Supreme Court; 1935–1940	Succeeded by
