= James H. Andreasen =

American judge (1931–2015)

Associate Justice of the Iowa Supreme Court
- In office November 13, 1987 – October 1, 1998
- Preceded by: W. Ward Reynoldson
- Succeeded by: Mark Cady

Personal details
- Born: May 16, 1931 Minneapolis, Minnesota, U.S.
- Died: May 14, 2015 (aged 83)
- Spouse(s): Janet Kimmel (m. 1961; died 1985) Marilyn Kuester (m. 1987)
- Children: 6
- Parent(s): John Andreasen; Alice Wilberg Andreasen
- Education: University of Iowa
- Profession: Lawyer, judge

Military service
- Allegiance: United States
- Branch/service: United States Air Force
- Years of service: 1954–1956
- Rank: Second lieutenant

James Hallis Andreasen (May 16, 1931 – May 14, 2015) was Justice of the Iowa Supreme Court from November 13, 1987, to October 1, 1998, appointed from Kossuth County, Iowa.

Political offices
Preceded by W. Ward Reynoldson	Justice of the Iowa Supreme Court; 1987–1998	Succeeded by Mark Cady
