= Linda K. Neuman =

American judge (born 1948)

Associate Justice of the Iowa Supreme Court
- In office August 4, 1986 – July 11, 2003
- Appointed by: Terry Branstad
- Preceded by: Harvey Uhlenhopp
- Succeeded by: David Wiggins

Personal details
- Born: Linda Kinney; June 18, 1948 (age 77) Chicago, Illinois, U.S.
- Education: University of Colorado Boulder (BA, JD)

Linda Kinney Neuman (born June 18, 1948) is an American attorney and jurist who served as a justice of the Iowa Supreme Court from August 4, 1986, to July 11, 2003. She was appointed from Scott County, Iowa.

== Early life and education ==
Neuman was born in Chicago, Illinois on June 18, 1948, the daughter of Harold S. and Mary E. Kinney. She moved to Denver, Colorado with her family in 1956. She received a Bachelor of Arts degree from the University of Colorado Boulder in 1970 and a Juris Doctor from the University of Colorado Law School in 1973. She married Harry G. Neuman in 1977, with whom she would have two children.

== Career ==
After marrying her husband in 1977, Neuman moved to the Quad Cities region. She worked as a trust officer at a local bank and was a professor at the University of Iowa before her appointment as a judicial magistrate for Scott County, Iowa. She was appointed to the Iowa Supreme Court by Governor Terry Branstad in 1986, becoming the first woman to serve on the court.

Neuman was inducted into the Iowa Women's Hall of Fame in 2015.

== See also ==
- List of female state supreme court justices
