= Edgar A. Morling =

Iowa Supreme Court Justice (1864–1932)

Justice of the Iowa Supreme Court
- In office October 1, 1925 – October 15, 1932

Personal details
- Born: April 21, 1864
- Died: October 15, 1932 (aged 68)

Edgar Alfred Morling (April 21, 1864 – October 15, 1932) was a justice of the Iowa Supreme Court from October 1, 1925, to October 15, 1932, appointed from Palo Alto County, Iowa.

Political offices
Preceded by Thomas Arthur	Justice of the Iowa Supreme Court; 1925–1932	Succeeded by George C. Claussen
