= 2023 Des Moines mayoral election =

← 2019	November 7, 2023	2027 →
Candidate	Connie Boesen	Josh Mandelbaum
Popular vote	14,488	13,777
Percentage	48.22%	45.85%
- Precinct results Boesen: 40–50% 50–60% 60–70% 70–80% Mandelbaum: 40–50% 50–60% 60–70% Tie: 40–50% No votes
Mayor before election
Frank Cownie
Democratic
Elected mayor
Connie Boesen
Democratic

The 2023 Des Moines mayoral election was held on November 7, 2023. Mayoral elections in Des Moines are officially nonpartisan and use the plurality vote system, with no possibility of a runoff. Incumbent mayor Frank Cownie decided to retire rather than run for re-election to a historic sixth term in office.

At-large city councilor Connie Boesen narrowly defeated ward 3 city councilor Josh Mandelbaum, as well as several other candidates. Boesen had been endorsed by Cownie as well as the city's largest newspaper, The Des Moines Register, and every other member of the city council with the exception of Mandelbaum. Boesen was sworn in as the first female mayor of Des Moines on January 8, 2024.

== Candidates ==
=== Declared ===
- Connie Boesen, at-large city councilor and mayor pro tempore (Party affiliation: Democratic)
- Denver Foote, cosmetologist (Party affiliation: Democratic)
- Josh Mandelbaum, city councilor for ward 3 (Party affiliation: Democratic)
- Christopter Von Arx (Party affiliation: Republican)

=== Declined ===
- Frank Cownie, incumbent mayor (Party affiliation: Democratic) (endorsed Boesen)

== Endorsements ==
Connie Boesen (D)

Local officials

- Frank Cownie, incumbent mayor of Des Moines
- Joe Gatto, city councilor for ward 4
- Carl Voss, at-large city councilor
- Linda Westergaard, city councilor for ward 2

Newspapers

- The Des Moines Register

== Results ==
2023 Des Moines mayoral general election
Candidate	Votes	%
Connie Boesen	14,488	48.22
Josh Mandelbaum	13,777	45.85
Denver Foote	971	3.23
Christopher Von Arx	704	2.34
Write-ins	107	0.36
Total votes	30,047	100
