= Richard Olson =

Richard Olson or Richard Olsen may refer to:

- Richard G. Olson (born 1959), American diplomat
- Richard Olson (politician) (1929–2014), mayor of Des Moines, Iowa
- Richard Olson (racing driver) (born 2003), Swedish-German racing driver
- Richard Olsen (1911–1956), Danish rower
- Richard Olsen (hammer thrower) (born 1958), Norwegian hammer thrower, 21st at the 1983 World Championships in Athletics – Men's hammer throw

== See also ==
- Rick Olson (disambiguation)
