= Mark McCormick (judge) =

American judge (1933–2025)

Associate Justice of the Iowa Supreme Court
- In office April 12, 1972 – January 31, 1986
- Appointed by: Robert D. Ray

Personal details
- Born: April 13, 1933 Fort Dodge, Iowa, U.S.
- Died: March 30, 2025 (aged 91)
- Party: Democratic
- Education: Villanova University (AB); Georgetown University Law Center (LL.B.); University of Virginia School of Law (LL.M.)

Mark McCormick (April 13, 1933 – March 30, 2025) was an American judge who was a justice of the Iowa Supreme Court, serving from 1972 to 1986.

== Early career ==
After graduating from Villanova University, McCormick served for three years as an officer in the United States Navy. He graduated from Georgetown University Law Center in 1960, then clerked on the United States Court of Appeals for the Eighth Circuit for Judge Harvey M. Johnsen. McCormick then returned to Fort Dodge and practiced law from 1961 to 1968, during which he was also an Assistant Webster County attorney.

== Judicial career ==
From 1968 to 1972, McCormick served as a judge of the Iowa District Court. In 1972, Governor Robert D. Ray appointed McCormick to the Iowa Supreme Court.

== Return to private practice and political career ==
In 1986, McCormick retired from the Iowa Supreme Court to join the Des Moines firm Belin, Harris, Helmick & Tesdell as a partner. In 1997, the firm was renamed Belin Lamson McCormick Zumbach Flynn, before being renamed once more to Belin McCormick. In private practice, McCormick was rated in Band 1 for commercial litigation by Chambers & Partners.

He published a treatise on jury selection and articles in the Iowa Law Review and the Drake Law Review. He also argued before the Supreme Court of the United States in Fitzgerald v. Racing Association of Central Iowa in 2002.

In 1998, McCormick ran in the Democratic primary to be Governor of Iowa and narrowly lost to Tom Vilsack. In 2003, he ran for Mayor of Des Moines and narrowly came third in the first round and missed to stand in the run-off election which Frank Cownie won. In 2010, McCormick advocated for the retention of the justices of the Iowa Supreme Court in response to the backlash over the decision in Varnum v. Brien, legalizing same-sex marriage in Iowa.

== Death ==
McCormick died on March 30, 2025, at the age of 91.

Political offices
Preceded by Francis H. Becker	Justice of the Iowa Supreme Court; 1972–1986	Succeeded by Louis A. Lavorato
