= Judge McCormick =

Judge McCormick may refer to:

- Andrew Phelps McCormick (1832–1916), judge of the United States Court of Appeals for the Fifth Circuit
- John E. McCormick (1924–2010), judge of the Wisconsin Circuit Court
- Kathaleen McCormick (born 1979/80), judge of the Delaware Court of Chancery
- Mark McCormick (judge) (born 1933), justice of the Iowa Supreme Court
- Paul John McCormick (1879–1960), judge of the United States District Court for the Southern District of California
