= Mark McCormack (disambiguation) =

Mark McCormack (1930–2003) was an American lawyer, sports agent and writer.

Mark McCormack may also refer to:

- Mark McCormack (cyclist) (born 1970), American cyclo-cross and road bicycle racer
- Mark McCormack (footballer) (born 1972), former Irish football player

== See also ==
- Mark McCormick (disambiguation)
