= Barlow Granger =

Iowa politician (1816–1905)

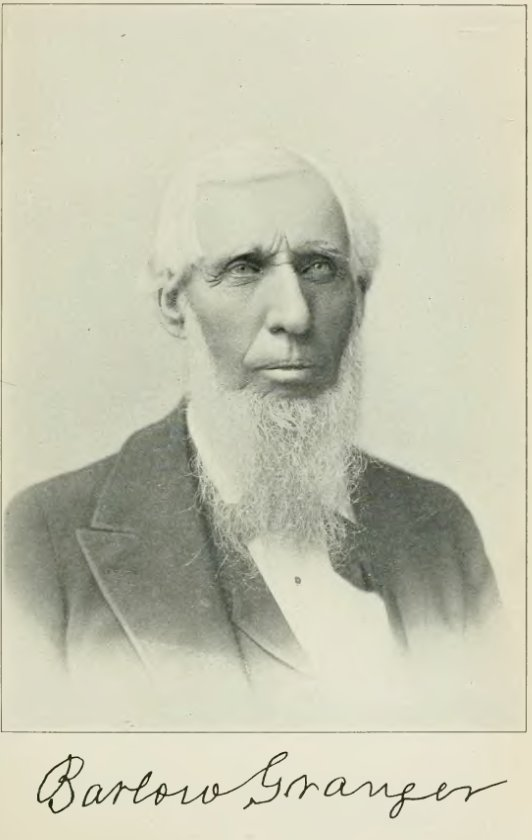
- Granger in 1903

Mayor of Des Moines
- In office 1855–1856
- Preceded by: Lampson P. Sherman
- Succeeded by: William DeFord

Personal details
- Born: May 31, 1816 Cayuga, New York
- Died: June 7, 1905 (aged 89) Des Moines, Iowa
- Resting place: Elm Grove Cemetery
- Spouse: Lucinda Rush

Barlow Granger (May 31, 1816 – June 7, 1905) was an American politician who founded The Des Moines Register and served as the mayor of Des Moines, Iowa, from 1855 to 1856. Granger was born in New York but travelled across the United States while working as a journeyman. In 1837, he started a tour out west, meeting a friend in St. Louis to explore Iowa, the newest state at the time. After moving to Des Moines, he bought a plot of land known today as Terrance Hill to initially start selling real estate, later starting a newspaper company called the Iowa Star that would become The Des Moines Register. He served as the mayor of Sevastopol, a Des Moines settlement, twice.

== Early life ==
Granger was born in Cayuga, New York, on May 31, 1816. In 1828, he moved with his family to Rochester and attended public schools until he was 13, when he worked as a printer's apprentice. In 1835, he found a job as a journeyman in New York City and travelled to cities such as Detroit, New Haven, and Cleveland. In 1838, he moved back to New York and lived in Albany for 10 years. In 1847, he started a tour out west to cities like Chicago, Minneapolis, and St. Louis to continue working.

== Work in Iowa ==
In St. Louis, Granger reunited with an old friend from Albany, and they both agreed to explore Iowa, which was the newest U.S. state at the time. They took a boat from St. Louis to Keokuk, then hired a horse and buggy to Des Moines, where they arrived in 1848. Granger founded a plot of land in Des Moines, now known as Terrace Hill. Initially, Granger started buying and selling real estate. He later started a newspaper business called the Iowa Star, now known as The Des Moines Register. Granger began the paper in an abandoned log cabin by the junction of the Des Moines and Raccoon River. On July 26, 1849, the first papers came into publication, and only a few hundred copies were distributed. The newspaper was known as "a spicy, well-gotten-up paper" with a mostly Democratic readership, though people from the Whig Party bought the paper as well. On February 22, 1850, Granger was succeeded by Curtis Bates.

Due to his previous experience with law in New York, he was admitted to the bar in 1848, and from 1850 to 1854, he served as colonel on the staff of the governor of Hampstead. In August 1854, he was elected prosecuting attorney of the county and served until July 1855. He served as the mayor of Des Moines for a year and twice as the mayor of Sevastopol.

== Personal life and death ==
On October 7, 1856, Granger married his wife, Lucinda Rush. After their marriage, they built a house, and Granger resided there until his death on June 7, 1905. Granger was buried at Elm Grove Cemetery, 3 miles (4.8 km) southwest of where he lived. His property was turned into Pioneer Park, a 46.4 acres (18.8 ha) park southwest of Des Moines.
