= Mark McCormick =

Mark McCormick may refer to:

- Mark McCormick (Santa Barbara), character on the television soap opera Santa Barbara
- Mark McCormick (judge) (1933–2025), justice on the Iowa Supreme Court from 1972 to 1986
- Mark McCormick, golfer who won the 2008 New Jersey State Open
- Mark McCormick, Ireland, baseball player chosen in the 2005 Major League Baseball draft who never played in MLB
- Mark McCormick, Northern Ireland, footballer who was a non-participating sideline player in the 2000 Scottish Challenge Cup Final
- Mark McCormick, American motorcycle racer who competed in the 2011 AMA Pro Daytona Sportbike Championship
- Mark McCormick, character on the American action crime drama television series Hardcastle and McCormick

== See also ==
- Mark McCormack (disambiguation)
