= 1861 Iowa gubernatorial election =

- October 8, 1861
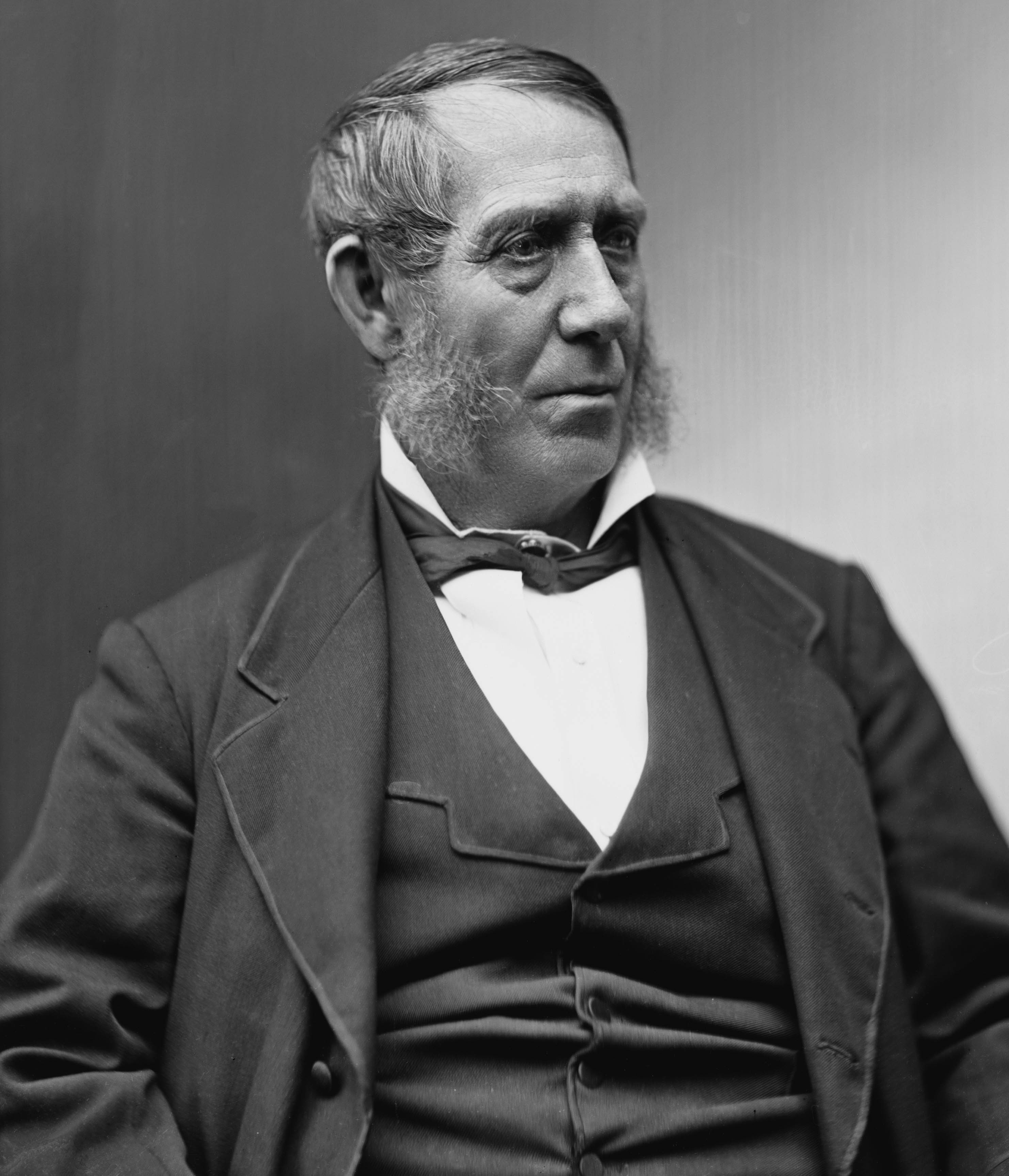

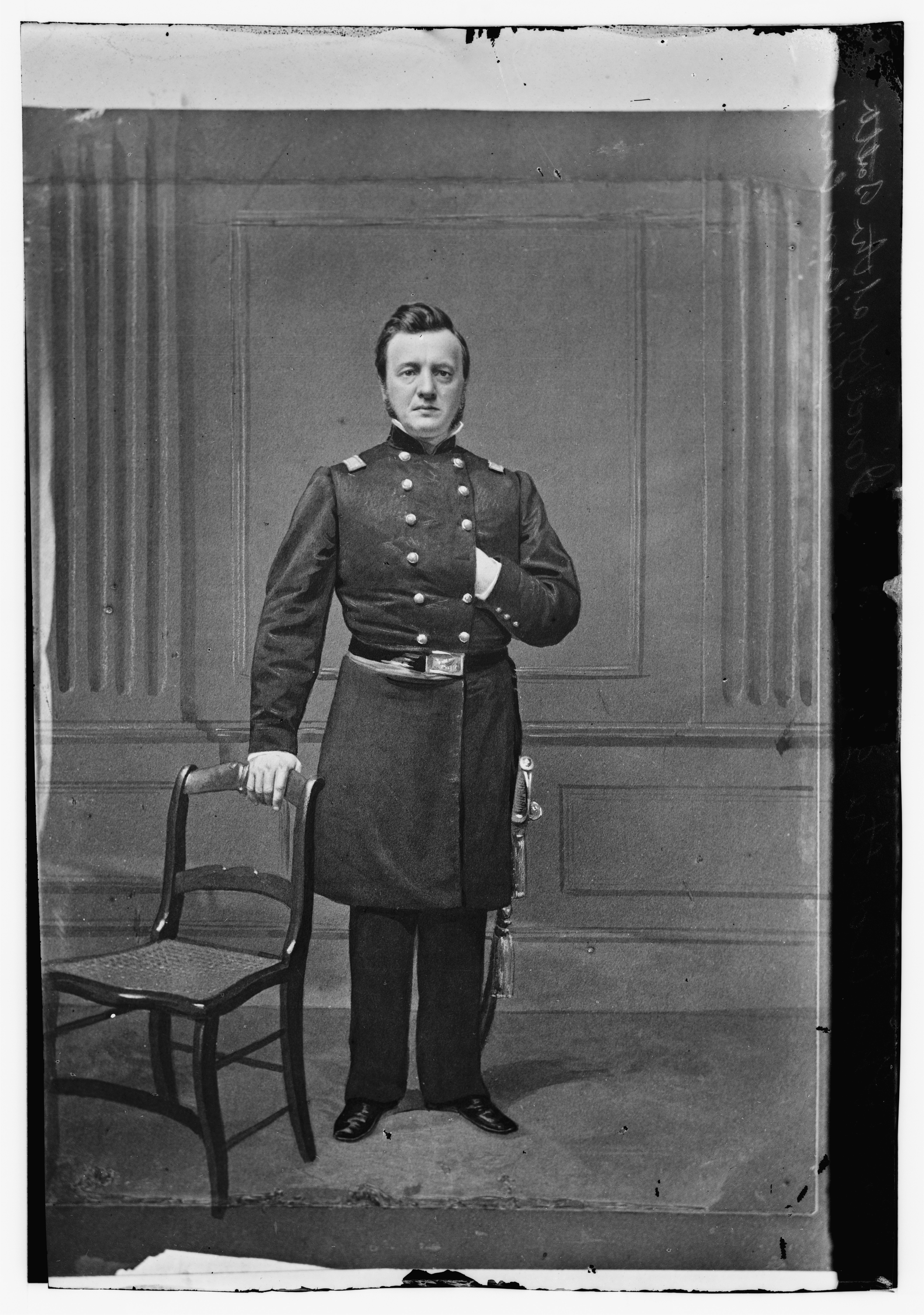
Nominee	Samuel J. Kirkwood	William H. Merritt
Party	Republican	Democratic
Popular vote	60,303	43,245
Percentage	55.48%	39.78%
- County results Kirkwood: 50–60% 60–70% 70–80% 80–90% 90–100% Merritt: 50–60% 60–70% 70–80% 80–90% 90–100% No Data/Votes
Governor before election
Samuel J. Kirkwood
Republican
Elected Governor
Samuel J. Kirkwood
Republican

The 1861 Iowa gubernatorial election was held on October 8, 1861, in order to elect the governor of Iowa. Incumbent Republican governor Samuel J. Kirkwood was re-elected against Democratic nominee William H. Merritt and several other candidates.

== General election ==
On election day, October 8, 1861, incumbent Republican governor Samuel J. Kirkwood won re-election by a margin of 17,058 votes against his foremost opponent Democratic nominee William H. Merritt, thereby holding Republican control over the office of governor. Kirkwood was sworn in for his second term on January 3, 1862.

=== Results ===
Iowa gubernatorial election, 1861
Party	Candidate	Votes	%
Republican	Samuel J. Kirkwood	60,303	55.48
Democratic	William H. Merritt	43,245	39.78
Democratic	Ben M. Samuels	4,495	4.14
Democratic	Henry Clay Dean	440	0.41
Democratic	Charles Mason	142	0.13
Democratic	Lincoln Clark	50	0.05
	Scattering	25	0.02
Total votes		108,700	100.00
Republican hold			
