= 1997 Des Moines mayoral special election =

Des Moines mayoral special election, 1997
- October 7, 1997 (first round); November 4, 1997 (runoff)
Candidate	Preston Daniels	Jim Cownie
Party	Democratic	Nonpartisan
Popular vote	20,659	17,394
Percentage	54.14%	45.58%
Mayor before election
Robert D. Ray (interim)
Republican
Elected mayor
Preston Daniels
Democratic

The 1997 Des Moines mayoral special election was held on October 7, 1997, to elect the mayor of Des Moines, Iowa. It saw the election of Preston Daniels. Daniels became the city's first African American mayor.

== Results ==
=== First round ===
First round results
Party	Candidate	Votes	%
Democratic	Preston Daniels	5,294	58.04
Nonpartisan	Jim Cownie	3,618	39.66
Nonpartisan	Thomas Alter	169	1.85
Write-in		41	0.45
Total votes		9,122	

=== Runoff ===
Runoff results
Party	Candidate	Votes	%
Democratic	Frank Cownie	20,659	54.14
Nonpartisan	Jim Cownie	17,394	45.58
Write-in		107	0.28
Total votes		36,350	
Democratic gain from Republican			
