= Benjamin Franklin Allen =

Iowa politician (1829–1914)

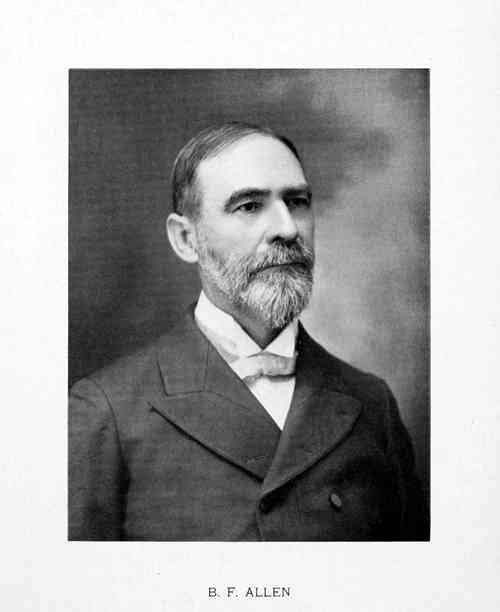
- Allen in 1908

Member of the Iowa Senate from the 29th district
- In office 1870–1874

Personal details
- Born: April 27, 1829 Salem, Indiana
- Died: April 14, 1914 (aged 84) Hollywood, California
- Resting place: Woodland Cemetery, Des Moines
- Party: Republican
- Spouse: Arathusa West
- Children: 6
- Occupation: Politician, businessman

Benjamin Franklin Allen (Note: Also written as Benjamin F. Allen, or B. F. Allen, and also known as Frank) (April 27, 1829 – April 14, 1914) was a member of Iowa's 29th Senate district, and Iowa's first millionaire. Allen owned multiple companies in Des Moines, then expanded to railroad companies and banks outside of Iowa. Most of his fortune was lost after investing the majority of his wealth into Cook County National Bank in Chicago, which later crashed, causing him to move to California and grow fruit.

== Early life ==
Allen was born in Salem, Indiana. Allen became an orphan at four years old, living with his grandfather in Ohio until he turned 17 when he enlisted in military service. Allen was a teamster in Mexico during the Mexican–American War. He travelled to Iowa in 1848 at 19 years old so he could collect an inheritance from his uncle, Captain James Allen, who was responsible for establishing Fort Des Moines, an army outpost, in 1843.

== Career ==
When Allen arrived in Iowa, he started making money as a merchant. In 1848, he opened a general store with Jonathan Lyon, and two years later in 1850 he started a sawmill with Charles Van. In 1851, Allen and R. W. Sypher bought a steamboat in St. Louis and brought it to Des Moines for trade. In 1855, Allen started banking in Des Moines, opening a bank and a real estate office. In 1857, the State Bank of Iowa opened with eight branches. Allen was a director for the Des Moines branch. During the Panic of 1857, Allen was able to rescue firms in Des Moines by making loans from his bank notes of Nebraska notes, slowly becoming one of the leading bankers in the west. The same year, Allen built a two-story brick house, in which the block it was built on was later turned into a hotel. In 1865, the branches were merged into the National State Bank.

Allen was elected to the Des Moines City Council in 1860 for the Second Ward. Allen represented Polk County as a senator in the Thirteenth and Fourteenth General Assemblies. During the thirteenth general assembly, he was chairman for the Suppression of Intemperance. During the fourteenth general assembly, he was chairman for banks, and part of committees for Claims, Public Buildings, Railroads, and Ways and Means. Allen also helped secure legislation for the new capitol building.

In 1865, Allen directed and was a stockholder in the Rock Island Railroad, where he helped it reach Des Moines in 1867. Allen was able to buy property along a proposed railroad route west to the Missouri River, where he then established a land company to plot and sell town sites. Allen also organized a gas and a coal company after the Civil War ended. He started the first gas company in Des Moines at Second and Elm streets. Allen tried using coal and superheated steam to make hydro-carbon gas. Due to the retorts cracking under the extreme heat, the company switched back to conventional methods. He also organized a coal company with Wesley Redhead called the Des Moines Coal Company, with the shallow deposits being quickly exhausted. The same year he also started an insurance company with E. J. Ingersoll called Hawkeye Insurance Company. In 1871, Allen organized the Des Moines Water Company which had $300,000 of capital. Allen became Iowa's first millionaire, with his fortune estimated at between $4 and $12 million at its height.

In 1873, Allen had significant debt due to borrowing the Rock Island Railroad trust funds for his own investments. Allen purchased controlling interest and became the president of Cook County National Bank in Chicago to try and pay off his court debts. Allen put most of his fortune into funding the bank, but in 1876 (Note: State of Iowa says January 1875), the bank crashed. The crash also affected many businessmen and regular people. This led to a committee being selected for Allen and what property he would have to turn over, but the litigation left almost nothing for creditors to take. The legal proceedings over Allen's estate dragged on into the mid-1880s. In the span of eight years he was tried twice for fraud and neither jury convicted him. He kept Terrace Hill and 8 acres (3.2 ha) of grounds until 1884 when it was purchased for $60,000. Allen sold the rest of his fortunes and moved to Leadville, Colorado to try starting up a store, but failed. Allen then moved to California to grow fruit. He later supervised forestry work in California for the federal government. He was later dismissed from the post for graft.

== Personal life and death ==
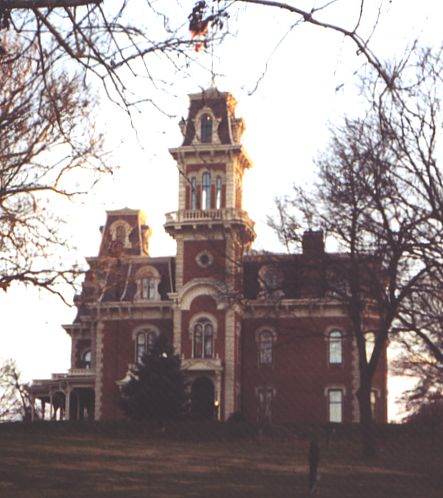
Terrace Hill in 2005

In 1854, Allen married Arathusa West. They had six children, two of whom died in infancy. In 1866, Allen began construction of Terrace Hill; the house was built between 1866 and 1869 and cost approximately $250,000 for the building and grounds. In 1869, Allen hosted a housewarming party for 700 guests, spending some $6,000 on the supper and $2,000 on floral decorations, including a $700 centerpiece. (Note: $8,000 in 1869 is approximately $194000 today.) Terrace Hill is now the official residence of the Governor of Iowa. Allen's wife died in January 1876. Allen died on April 14, 1914, in Hollywood, California. His ashes were placed in the family lot at Woodland Cemetery in Des Moines.
