= 1999 Des Moines mayoral election =

Des Moines mayoral election, 1999
- October 5, 1999 (first round); November 2, 1999 (runoff)
Candidate	Preston Daniels	Tim Urban
Party	Democratic	Nonpartisan
Popular vote	23,009	13,260
Percentage	63.30%	36.48%
Mayor before election
Preston Daniels
Democratic
Elected mayor
Preston Daniels
Democratic

The 1999 Des Moines mayoral election was held on October 5, 1999, to elect the mayor of Des Moines, Iowa. It saw Preston Daniels win reelection.

== Results ==
=== First round ===
First round results
Party	Candidate	Votes	%
Democratic	Preston Daniels (incumbent)	7,235	57.67
Nonpartisan	Tim Urban	5,035	40.14
Socialist Workers	Joseph R. Swanson	247	1.97
Write-in		28	0.22
Total votes		12,545	

=== Runoff ===
Runoff results
Party	Candidate	Votes	%
Democratic	Frank Cownie	23,009	63.30
Nonpartisan	Tim Urban	13,260	36.48
Write-in		81	0.22
Total votes		36,350	
Democratic hold			
