= Connie Boesen =

American politician

Mayor of Des Moines
- Incumbent
- Assumed office January 2, 2024
- Preceded by: Frank Cownie

Personal details
- Born: March 28, 1951 (age 75)
- Party: Democratic
- Education: Grand View University (attended); Des Moines Area Community College (attended)

Connie Boesen (born March 28, 1951) is an American politician from Iowa. She is the mayor of Des Moines.

Boesen is from Des Moines, Iowa. Her father, Ken Fulk, managed the Iowa State Fair. She graduated from East High School in Des Moines, Iowa. She attended Des Moines Area Community College and Grand View University. She worked for Younkers as a buyer for 34 years. In 1988, she founded a concessions company, Applishus.

Boesen served on the Des Moines School Board from 2003 to 2017. She was elected to the Des Moines City Council as an at-large member in 2017 and reelected in 2021. Boesen announced her candidacy for mayor in the 2023 election in March 2023. She defeated fellow councilmember Josh Mandelbaum in the general election. She assumed office on January 2, 2024. Boesen is Des Moines' first female mayor.

Political offices
| Preceded by Frank Cownie | Mayor of Des Moines; 2024–present | Incumbent |
