= 2007 Des Moines mayoral election =

Des Moines mayoral election, 2007
- November 6, 2007
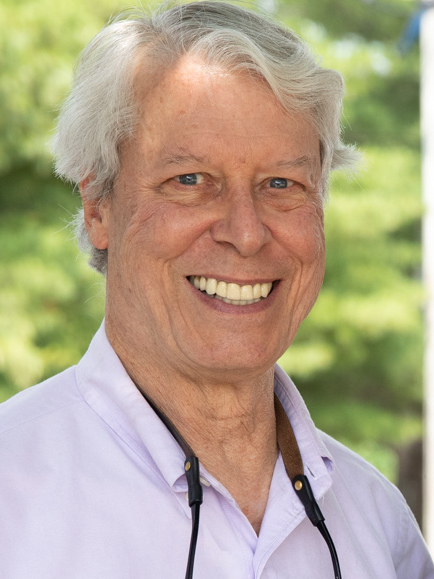

Candidate	Frank Cownie	Diana Newberry
Party	Democratic	Socialist Workers
Popular vote	6,455	1,617
Percentage	78.97%	19.78%
Mayor before election
Frank Cownie
Democratic
Elected mayor
Frank Cownie
Democratic

The 2007 Des Moines mayoral election was held on November 6, 2007, to elect the mayor of Des Moines, Iowa. It saw Frank Cownie win reelection.

== Results ==
Results
Party	Candidate	Votes	%
Democratic	Frank Cownie (incumbent)	6,455	78.97
Socialist Workers	Diana Newberry	1,617	19.78
Write-in		102	1.25
Total votes		8,174	
Democratic hold			
