= William H. Hatch (New Hampshire politician) =

American politician

Member of the New Hampshire House of Representatives from the Hillsborough 23rd district
- In office 1986–1990

Personal details
- Born: May 1, 1947 (age 79) Connecticut, U.S.
- Party: Republican
- Relatives: Jack Hatch (brother); Albert R. Hatch (great-grandfather)
- Education: Boston University

William H. Hatch (born May 1, 1947) is an American politician. A member of the Republican Party, he served in the New Hampshire House of Representatives from 1986 to 1990.

== Life and career ==
Hatch was born in Connecticut, the son of Francis and Joan Hatch. He was the brother of Jack Hatch, an Iowa state senator, and was the great-grandson of Albert R. Hatch, a New Hampshire representative. He attended Farmington High School, graduating in 1965. After graduating, he served in the United States Army, which after his discharge, he attended Boston University, earning his MBA degree in 1974.

Hatch served in the New Hampshire House of Representatives from 1986 to 1990.

In 1992, Hatch ran as a Republican candidate for United States representative from the New Hampshire's 2nd district. He received 91,127 votes, but lost to Democratic incumbent Richard N. Swett, who won with 157,328 votes.
