= Cayuga, New York =

- Village
- Location within the state of New York
- Coordinates: 42°55′7″N 76°43′37″W
- Country: United States
- State: New York
- County: Cayuga
- Town: Aurelius
- Incorporated: 1857

Government
  - Mayor: William Sherman

Area
  - Total: 1.37 sq mi (3.54 km^{2})
  - Land: 0.90 sq mi (2.34 km^{2})
  - Water: 0.46 sq mi (1.20 km^{2})
- Elevation: 482 ft (147 m)

Population (2020)
  - Total: 472
  - Density: 522.2/sq mi (201.63/km^{2})
- Time zone: UTC-5 (Eastern (EST))
  - Summer (DST): UTC-4 (EDT)
- ZIP code: 13034
- Area code: 315
- FIPS code: 36-13068
- GNIS feature ID: 0946081
- Website: www.villagecayugany.com

Cayuga is a village in Cayuga County, New York, United States. As of the 2020 census, Cayuga had a population of 472. The village derives its name from the indigenous Cayuga people and the lake named after them.

The village of Cayuga is in the western part of the town of Aurelius.

== History ==
The Sullivan Expedition of 1779 passed through the town. The village was incorporated in 1857, and re-incorporated in 1874.

The Hutchinson Homestead was listed on the National Register of Historic Places in 2009.

== Geography ==
According to the United States Census Bureau, Cayuga has a total area of 1.4 square miles (3.5 km^{2}), of which 0.89 square miles (2.3 km^{2}) is land and 0.46 square miles (1.2 km^{2}), or 33.81%, is water.

Cayuga is located on the eastern shore of the northern end of Cayuga Lake.

New York State Route 90 is a north–south highway through the village.

== Demographics ==
Historical population
Census	Pop.	Note	%±
1870	435		—
1880	484		11.3%
1890	511		5.6%
1900	390		−23.7%
1910	348		−10.8%
1920	300		−13.8%
1930	344		14.7%
1940	472		37.2%
1950	534		13.1%
1960	621		16.3%
1970	693		11.6%
1980	604		−12.8%
1990	556		−7.9%
2000	509		−8.5%
2010	549		7.9%
2020	472		−14.0%
U.S. Decennial Census

At the 2000 census there were 509 people, 203 households, and 137 families in the village. The population density was 554.4 inhabitants per square mile (214.1/km^{2}). There were 240 housing units at an average density of 261.4 per square mile (100.9/km^{2}). The racial makeup of the village was 99.02% White, 0.39% African American, 0.39% Native American, and 0.20% from two or more races. Hispanic or Latino of any race were 0.39%.

Of the 203 households 35.5% had children under the age of 18 living with them, 56.7% were married couples living together, 8.4% had a female householder with no husband present, and 32.5% were non-families. 29.6% of households were one person and 14.8% were one person aged 65 or older. The average household size was 2.51 and the average family size was 3.17.

The age distribution was 28.1% under the age of 18, 6.5% from 18 to 24, 25.7% from 25 to 44, 23.2% from 45 to 64, and 16.5% 65 or older. The median age was 39 years. For every 100 females, there were 92.8 males. For every 100 females age 18 and over, there were 85.8 males.

The median household income was $37,679 and the median family income was $50,156. Males had a median income of $30,769 versus $21,667 for females. The per capita income for the village was $17,894. About 1.5% of families and 3.1% of the population were below the poverty line, including 3.1% of those under age 18 and none of those age 65 or over.

== Education ==
It is in the Union Springs Central School District.

== Notable people ==
- Andrew Harris (1814–1841), African American minister and abolitionist; raised in Cayuga.
- John Richardson Harris (1790−1829), founder of Harrisburg, Texas
- Barlow Granger (1816-1905), mayor of Des Moines, Iowa.
- Marie Parcello (1860–1937), opera singer; born in Cayuga
- Rod Serling (1924–1975), creator of The Twilight Zone; lived partly in Cayuga
- William Foote Whyte (1914–2000), sociologist; retired to Cayuga
