= Christopher McDonald (jurist) =

American judge (born 1974)

Associate Justice of the Iowa Supreme Court
- Incumbent
- Assumed office February 20, 2019
- Appointed by: Kim Reynolds
- Preceded by: Daryl Hecht

Personal details
- Born: Christopher Lee McDonald; September 17, 1974 (age 50); Bangkok, Thailand
- Education: Grand View University (BA); University of Iowa (JD)

Christopher Lee McDonald (born September 17, 1974) is an American judge who has served as an associate justice of the Iowa Supreme Court since 2019.

== Education ==
McDonald was born in Bangkok, Thailand to a Vietnamese mother and an American father of Scots-Irish ancestry. He spent his childhood at military bases around the world before his family eventually moved to Des Moines. McDonald started college at the University of Iowa, but left after a year to teach policy debate at Abraham Lincoln High School in Des Moines. He later received a Bachelor of Arts from Grand View University and a Juris Doctor from the University of Iowa College of Law. At Iowa Law, he was an editor of the Iowa Law Review, graduated with highest distinction as valedictorian, and was elected to the Order of the Coif.

== Legal career ==
After graduation, McDonald served as a law clerk to Judge David R. Hansen of the United States Court of Appeals for the Eighth Circuit. He then practiced at the Des Moines office of Faegre & Benson from 2003 to 2006 before leaving for the Des Moines-based firm Belin McCormick P.C., where he became a partner and practiced from 2006 to 2010. At both firms, he practiced civil litigation, internal investigations, and employment law. He was then senior litigation counsel at Aviva in Des Moines from 2010 to 2012.

== Judicial career ==
=== State court service ===
McDonald served as a trial judge of Iowa's Fifth Judicial District from 2012 to 2013. Terry Branstad appointed him to the Iowa Court of Appeals in 2013 and he served in that capacity until his appointment to the Iowa Supreme Court.

=== Iowa Supreme Court ===
McDonald first applied for a vacancy on the Supreme Court upon the retirement of Justice Bruce B. Zager. That vacancy was ultimately filled by Susan Christensen. In January 2019 McDonald once again applied, and was among three nominees sent to the governor to fill the vacancy created by Justice Daryl Hecht who retired in December 2018. On February 20, 2019, Governor Kim Reynolds announced McDonald as her appointment to the Supreme Court. He is the first minority or person of color appointed to the Iowa Supreme Court.

== See also ==
- List of Asian American jurists

Legal offices
Preceded by Daryl Hecht	Associate Justice of the Iowa Supreme Court; 2019–present	Incumbent
