= Jack Hatch =

American politician (born 1950)

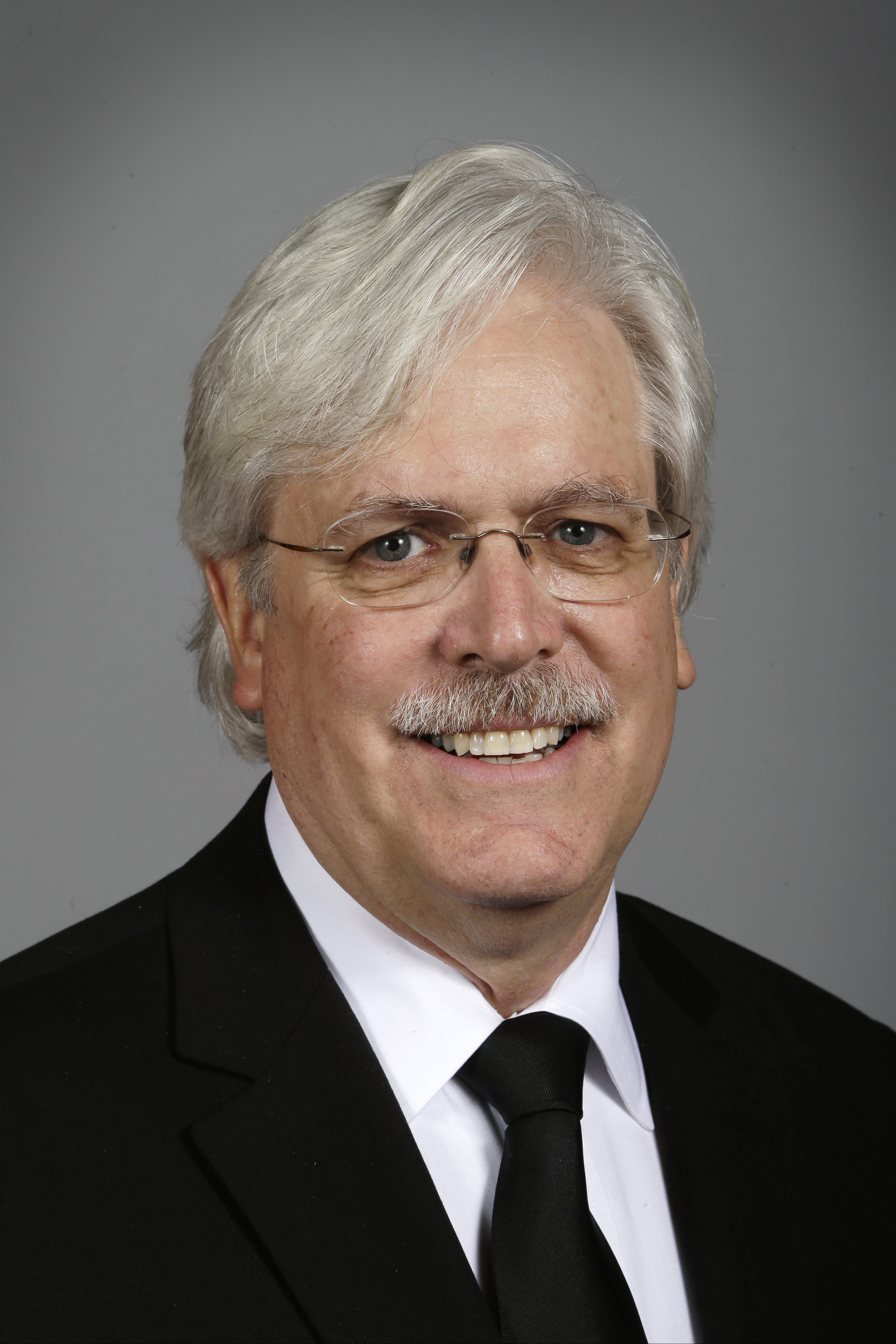

Member of the Iowa Senate from the 33rd district
- In office January 13, 2003 – January 12, 2015
- Preceded by: Jeff Lamberti
- Succeeded by: Tony Bisignano

Member of the Iowa House of Representatives from the 68th district
- In office January 8, 2001 – January 13, 2003
- Preceded by: Michael Cataldo
- Succeeded by: John Connors

Member of the Iowa House of Representatives from the 81st district
- In office January 14, 1985 – January 11, 1993
- Preceded by: Ned Chiodo
- Succeeded by: Jack Drake

Personal details
- Born: March 13, 1950 (age 76) Hartford, Connecticut, U.S.
- Party: Democratic
- Spouse: Sonja Roberts
- Children: 2
- Relatives: William H. Hatch (brother); Albert R. Hatch (great-grandfather)
- Education: Drake University (BS, MPA)
- Website: Campaign website

Jack G. Hatch (born March 13, 1950) is a former Iowa State Senator and American business owner. He was the Democratic nominee for Governor of Iowa in the 2014 election. A Democrat, Hatch served in the Iowa Senate from 2003 to 2015, and was an assistant majority leader. Prior to his election to the Iowa Senate, Hatch served in the Iowa House of Representatives from 1985 to 1993 and 2001 to 2003.

He unsuccessfully ran for mayor in the 2019 Des Moines mayoral election, narrowly being defeated by incumbent mayor Frank Cownie in the runoff.

== Personal life and education ==
Hatch, who struggled with dyslexia as a child, was born in Hartford, Connecticut. Hatch moved to Des Moines in 1968 as a freshman at Drake University. He graduated from Drake his B.S. in 1972 and his MPA in 1973. While a student at Drake, Hatch was elected student body president for the 1971–72 school year. In that school year he founded and organized the Ralph Nader inspired Iowa Student Public Interest Research group. After a petition drive on 13 college and university campuses, ISPIRG became a consumer-led interest group. Today, the organization still exists as Iowa PIRG. Prior to his election, Hatch organized the largest student volunteer program in the Midwest, The Revitalization Corps. The program sent more 750 students per year into inner-city tutoring programs and clinics offering counseling to mental health patients. Upon graduation he received the Orin E. Scott Award for the outstanding student of the year.

Hatch is married to Sonja Roberts. Together they live in the historic Sherman Hill neighborhood of Des Moines. They have two daughters.

== Career ==
Hatch represented the 33rd District of the Iowa Senate. His district includes much of the city of Des Moines. Hatch served on the Appropriations committee; the Economic Growth committee; the Human Resources committee; the Labor and Business Relations committee;and the State Government committee. He also chaired the Health and Human Services Appropriations Subcommittee.

Throughout his career, Hatch has helped write most of Iowa's major legislation over the past three decades. Hatch has primarily focused on issues relating to healthcare, education, children and families, and environmental proaction.

While in office, Hatch authored the 1989 Leaking Underground Storage Tank Act, co-sponsored legislation the creation of the Resource Enhancement Program, expanded Iowa's Brownfield and Greyfield tax credits, created IMAGES (Iowa's state-supported minority education scholarship program), created scholarship program to help foster kids attend state universities, co-sponsored earned income tax credits for low income earners, fought against discrimination to gays and lesbians in housing and employment and supported women's right to choose and family planning programs. Hatch also led the state's comprehensive health care reform establishing Hawk-i, Iowa's healthcare access program for young children.

Hatch's work reforming Iowa's healthcare system gained him national prominence when, in 2009, he was appointed chair of the White House Working Group of State Legislators for Health Reform. In that capacity, he led state legislators, in advising the president and Congress on national proposals for health reform.

Hatch was re-elected in 2006 and in 2010, running unopposed both times.

In 1997, together with his wife Sonja, Hatch founded Hatch Development Group, a company that builds affordable housing in low-income neighborhoods. Working with neighborhood leaders, city and county officials, lenders and investors, Hatch designed, built and managed eight housing communities.

Prior to serving in the Iowa Senate, Hatch twice served in the Iowa House of Representatives and served as the state director for U.S. Sen. Tom Harkin. Hatch also served as board member of the Des Moines Water Works in 1998, a board member of Des Moines Public Housing from 1996 to 1997, a board member of Children & Families of Iowa from 1980 to 1984.

== 2014 gubernatorial election ==
In 2013, Hatch announced his candidacy for Governor of Iowa. Hatch faced Republican incumbent Terry Branstad. Hatch focused his campaign on raising the minimum wage in Iowa, expanding healthcare and education access to children and cleaning environmental resources across the state.

In June 2014, Monica Vernon, a Cedar Rapids city councilwoman and advertising firm owner, joined Hatch's campaign as the candidate for Lieutenant Governor of Iowa.

Iowa House of Representatives
Preceded by Ned Chiodo	Member of the Iowa House of Representatives from the 81st district 1985–1993	Succeeded by Jack Drake
Preceded by Michael Cataldo	Member of the Iowa House of Representatives from the 68th district 2001–2003	Succeeded by John Connors
Iowa Senate
Preceded by Jeff Lamberti	Member of the Iowa Senate from the 33rd district 2003–present	Incumbent
Party political offices
Preceded by Chet Culver	Democratic nominee for Governor of Iowa; 2014	Succeeded by Fred Hubbell
