= Louis A. Lavorato =

American judge (born 1934)

Louis Lavorato

Chief Justice of the Iowa Supreme Court
- In office November 10, 2000 – September 2006
- Preceded by: Arthur A. McGiverin
- Succeeded by: Marsha Ternus

Associate Justice of the Iowa Supreme Court
- In office February 12, 1986 – 2000
- Preceded by: Mark McCormick
- Succeeded by: Daryl Hecht

Personal details
- Born: September 29, 1934 (age 91) Vinton, Iowa, U.S.
- Spouse: Diane Amsberg
- Children: 4

Military service
- Branch/service: United States Army
- Years of service: 1953-1957

Louis A. Lavorato (born September 29, 1934) is an American judge and lawyer. He was chief justice of the Iowa Supreme Court.

== Early life ==
Lavorato was born in Vinton, Iowa on September 29, 1934. His parents were Charles and Catherine Lavorato. He joined the United States Army, serving from 1953 to 1955.

Laborato graduated from Drake University with a BA and BS in 1959. He then graduated from Drake University Law School in 1962 with a JD. He was first in his class and received the Order of the Coif. He also served as the assistant editor of the Drake Law Review.

== Career ==
Lavorato practiced law in Des Moines, Iowa with Williams, Hart, Lavorato and Kirtley from 1962 to 1979. He then joined the Iowa Fifth District as a District Judge from 1979 to 1986, serving as its chief judge from 1983 to 1986. In January 1986, Governor Terry Branstad appointed Lavorato to be an associate justice of the Iowa Supreme Court. He was an associate justice from February 12, 1986, until 2000, when he became Chief Justice. He retired in September 2006.

Lavorato was a member of the American Bar Association, Iowa Academy of Trial Lawyers, and the Iowa State Bar Association. He served on the board of counselors of Drake Law School. In 1985. He received the Judicial Achievement Award from the Association of Trial Lawyers of Iowa. In 1996, he receviedthe Award of Merit of the Iowa Judges Association. Drake University gave him an honorary Doctor of Laws degree in 2003.

== Personal life ==
Lavorato married Dianne Amsberg of Davenport, Iowa. They have four children.

Political offices
| Preceded by Mark McCormick | Justice of the Iowa Supreme Court; 1986–2006 | Succeeded by Daryl Hecht |
