= Giles H. Turner =

American lawyer and politician (1824–1886)

Member of the Illinois House of Representatives from the 22nd district
- In office January 3, 1853 – January 1, 1855

Mayor of Des Moines
- In office 1873–1874
- Preceded by: J. P. Foster
- Succeeded by: A. Newton
- In office 1876–1877
- Preceded by: A. Newton
- Succeeded by: George Sneer

Personal details
- Born: May 13, 1824 Boone County, Missouri, U.S.
- Died: January 6, 1886 (aged 61) Des Moines, Iowa, U.S.
- Party: Republican; Whig
- Spouse: Delia Rickart

Giles H. Turner (May 13, 1824 – January 6, 1886) was an American lawyer and politician who served in the Illinois House of Representatives and as mayor of Des Moines, Iowa.

== Biography ==
Turner was born in Boone County, Missouri, May 13, 1824, and when fourteen years of age his parents moved to Jacksonville, Illinois. His father was a farmer, and young Turner naturally followed that as an occupation. He received a school education and graduated from the Illinois College. Studied law with Governor Yates and was admitted to the bar in 1846. From 1853 to 1855 he represented his district in the State Legislature. In 1858 he moved to Des Moines, Iowa, and was engaged, more or less, in the practice of his profession. He served as mayor of Des Moines from 1873 to 1874 and from 1876 to 1877, but resigned before the end of his second term, and was city attorney for six years. in 1851 he was married to Delia Rickart, Turner died from pleuropneumonia on January 6, 1886, at his home in Des Moines.
