= Daryl Hecht =

American judge (1952–2019)

Associate Justice of the Iowa Supreme Court
- In office September 6, 2006 – December 13, 2018
- Appointed by: Tom Vilsack
- Preceded by: Louis A. Lavorato
- Succeeded by: Christopher McDonald

Personal details
- Born: June 25, 1952 Lytton, Iowa
- Died: April 3, 2019 (aged 66)
- Education: Morningside College (BA); University of South Dakota (JD); University of Virginia (LLM)

Daryl L. Hecht (June 25, 1952 – April 3, 2019) was a justice on the Iowa Supreme Court and president of Iowa Trial Lawyers Association.

== Early life and education ==
Raised on a family farm near Lytton, Iowa, Hecht received a Bachelor of Arts in history and political science from Morningside College in 1974 and a Juris Doctor from the University of South Dakota School of Law in 1977. Hecht worked in private practice in Sioux City, Iowa for 22 years. His practice included plaintiff civil litigation, workers' compensation, and appeals.

== State judicial service ==
In 1999 Hecht was appointed to the Iowa Court of Appeals by Governor Tom Vilsack. In 2004, Hecht received a Master of Laws from the University of Virginia School of Law. On August 1, 2006, Hecht was appointed by Governor Vilsack to the Iowa Supreme Court. He succeeded Chief Justice Louis A. Lavorato upon Lavorato's retirement and joined the Supreme Court on September 30, 2006. In August 2017, he was retained in a retention election with 64% of the vote. Hecht continued to live in Sioux City as a judge on the Court of Appeals and the Supreme Court. Hecht worked on civil justice reform with the Institute for the Advancement of the Legal System, the National Center for State Courts, and the Conference of Chief Justices.

Hecht, through a press release from the Iowa Judicial Branch on November 16, 2018, announced his retirement from the court due to his battle with skin cancer. His resignation took effect December 13, 2018.

== Death ==
Hecht died on April 3, 2019, at the age of 66 from melanoma. Hecht and his wife Sandy had two daughters.

Political offices
Preceded by Louis Lavorato	Justice of the Iowa Supreme Court; 2006–2018	Succeeded by Christopher McDonald
