= Farmington Public Schools (Connecticut) =

School district in Connecticut, United States

Address
- 1 Monteith Drive Farmington, Connecticut 06032 United States

District information
- Type: Public
- Motto: Empowering Global Citizens
- Grades: Pre K-12
- Superintendent: Kathleen C. Greider

Other information
- Teachers' unions: AFT Connecticut; Connecticut Education Association

Farmington Public Schools is a school district headquartered in Farmington, Connecticut, United States.

== Schools ==
- Farmington High School (9-12)

=== Middle schools ===
- Irving A. Robbins Middle School (7-8)

=== Elementary schools ===
- East Farms Elementary School (K-4)
- Noah Wallace Elementary School (K-4)
- Union Elementary School (K-4)
- West District Elementary School (K-4)
- West Woods Upper Elementary School (5-6)

== Administrators ==
- Eric Martin (Director of Curriculum and Instruction)
