= Marie Parcello =

American opera singer (1860–1937)

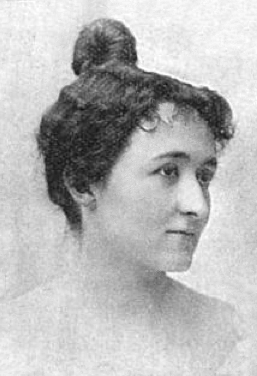
Marie Parcello

Marie Victoria Parcells (also, Maritje Victoria Parcells Bixby; nicknames, Maude, Maxie; August 27, 1860, Cayuga, New York – July 22, 1937, Plattsburgh, New York) was an American singer, better known by her adopted name, Marie Parcello. Her contralto voice had the unusual range of three octaves, from C to C. She debuted as a concert contralto in Paris at the age of 20.

== Early years and education ==
Parcello was born Maude Marie V. Parcells at Cayuga, New York. Her parents were Rev. Joseph Jerome and Mraitje (Felthousen) Parcells. She was surrounded by musical influences from her infancy, her grandfather, Dr. Christopher Feldhausen, being a violinist, and her father, Rev. Parcells, possessed a baritone voice. Two of her cousins were well-known musicians—the Rev. George Weed Barhydt, composer of church music, and the oratorio tenor, Edwin H. Douglass.

Parcells attended school at Auburn, New York, and from the age of seven had teachers in music, among them being I. V. Flagler, of Chautauqua, and for a short time Mrs. Sumner Salter, of Syracuse, New York. Becoming an orphan at an early age, her education was assumed by her aunt and adopted mother, Mrs. Gilbert Lincoln, who sent her to Europe to study piano and composition as a foundation for later vocal study, including the Berlin Music Conservatory, as well as music masters in Paris and Milan, and tutors in India and England. Upon her return to America, Psrcello made her home in New York City. She studied at New York University (graduate woman's law class), and took courses or lectures at Columbia University in New York.

== Career ==
She developed a reputation throughout the US as a teacher and lecturer in Young Ladies' Schools ("Illustrated Musical Lectures"). She diligently pursued her vocal studies with Adelina Murio-Celli d‘Elpeux, and became the solo contralto at the noted Church of St. Mary the Virgin. One summer was passed in London, where she began her operatic studies, gave many recitals, and became a social favorite.

At the beginning of her great career, she was severely injured by a fall on a defective sidewalk, while visiting at Auburn, New York. Spinal trouble resulted and she became an invalid for three years and was obliged to give up her profession. Part of this time, she was a cripple and under treatment at Auburn Hospital, after which upon the advice of physicians, she went to Nice, France where the climate proved a great help toward her recovery. She was absent from the musical world for three years, and during this enforced idleness showed the fortitude and patience, gaining many friends. As her prolonged ill-health involved great pecuniary loss, an action to recover damages was brought by Parcells against the city of Auburn, through whose official negligence the accident occurred. After a hotly contested lawsuit, the jury returned a verdict of US$9,000 damages in favor of the plaintiff. The city appealed from this, and the case was bitterly fought from court to court for more than two years, resulting in a victory for Parcells. Thirteen judges of the New York Supreme Court passed upon this case and all decided in her favor.

The long litigation ended in 1895, and Parcells at once started on an extended concert-tour, combining health and business interests. She visited Algiers, Italy, and the Riviera, giving song-recitals. From the Riviera, she went to Paris where her concert was the success of the season. The hall was hung with American flags and her patrons were the American Ambassador, Mrs. Eustis, the Duchess de Pomar, the British Ambassador, Lady Dufl'erin, and Mrs. Eames Story. Resuming her concert-tour she went to England and Belgium, appearing before King Leopold and other royalties and everywhere meeting success. During this tour, Parcells used the professional name of Marie Parcello, which she permanently adopted thereafter, for euphony.

After her return to New York, Parcello gave recitals at the Waldorf and Steinway Hall, and also opened a studio in Carnegie Hall where she trained contralto voices only, limiting herself to six pupils at a time. Parcello, having a liberal education, spoke and sang in four languages. She was also a pianist and devoted considerable time to composition. Her songs for contralto were published by Schuberth & Company.

== Writer ==
She was the author of The Persian Caravan, as well as a few songs, and newspaper letters for American and European journals. Her short stories included "A Ragged Rose", "Turkish Delight", "In an Algerian Garden", "The Song of Poulaphouca", and "The Long Irish Lady".

== Personal life ==
Parcells married George Stephenson Bixby, lawyer and journalist, in Amherst, Massachusetts on July 17, 1900. She made her winter home at 154 W. Fifty-seventh Street, New York City; and her spring, summer and autumn home at Gardenette, Plattsburgh, New York. Her studio was at Carnegie Hall. She had a religious nature, and since childhood, had a friend in Bishop Huntington, of Central New York, by whom she was confirmed and to whose influence and counsel she attributed much of her real success and happiness.

For 12 years, Parcells was a member of the board of managers of the Convalescent Home for Women, New York City. She was interested in playgrounds, concerts for working people, municipal art, public education, anti-tuberculosis movement and landscape gardening. She was a member of the State Charities Aid Association, Daughters of Holland Dames, the Navy League, American Scenic and Historic Preservation Society, Woman's Municipal League (New York City), Peace Society, Mary Washington Colonial Chapter D.A.R., the MacDowell Club of New York City, and Woman's Political Union, New York City. She was a Protestant Episcopalian, and favored women's suffrage.

== Bibliography ==
- Leonard, John W. (1914). Woman's Who's who of America: A Biographical Dictionary of Contemporary Women of the United States and Canada, 1914-1915 (Public domain ed.). American commonwealth Company.
- Singer, Sandra L. (2003). Adventures Abroad: North American Women at German-speaking Universities, 1868-1915. Greenwood Publishing Group. ISBN 978-0-313-32371-3.
- Werner, Edgar S. (1896). Werner's Magazine. Vol. 18 (Public domain ed.). E. S. Werner.
