= 1st Iowa Infantry Regiment =

- Active: May 14, 1861, to August 20/23, 1861
- Country: United States
- Branch: Union Army
- Role: Infantry
- Size: 959
- Engagements: American Civil War; Trans-Mississippi Theater; Battle of Dug Springs; Battle of Wilson's Creek

Commanders
- Notable commanders: William H. Merritt

The 1st Iowa Infantry Regiment was an infantry regiment that served in the Union Army during the American Civil War. The regiment's soldiers had enlisted for a period of three months after President Abraham Lincoln called for 75,000 volunteer soldiers in April 1861 after the outbreak of the war. The regiment was officially mustered in on May 14, and John F. Bates was elected as the regiment's commander. Starting out its service at Keokuk, Iowa, the regiment was transferred to Missouri in June, where it joined the forces of Nathaniel Lyon at Boonville. In July, the regiment marched with Lyon from Boonville to Springfield, and it participated in a skirmish at Forsyth on July 22.

On August 2, two companies of the regiment were present at the Battle of Dug Springs, and the entire regiment was engaged at the Battle of Wilson's Creek on August 10, when Lyon launched a surprise attack against the combined camps of the Missouri State Guard and a Confederate States Army force. At Wilson's Creek, the 1st Iowa fought on a prominence known as Bloody Hill, first on Lyon's left flank and then moving to another position to support the 1st Kansas Infantry Regiment. After Lyon was killed, his army, including the 1st Iowa, withdrew to Rolla. Mustered out at St. Louis on August 20 or 23, the men of the regiment returned to Iowa, where many reenlisted in other units.

== Service ==
=== Formation ===
The American Civil War began on April 12, 1861, with the Battle of Fort Sumter, in which troops of the Confederate States of America fired on a United States Army installation in Charleston Harbor. The Confederacy was a collection of slaveholding states that had seceded from the United States following the election of abolitionist Abraham Lincoln as president. The fort's garrison surrendered the next day, and on April 15 Lincoln called for troops to suppress the Confederacy. As part of Lincoln's call, which asked for 75,000 volunteer soldiers, the state of Iowa was asked to furnish a single regiment. In the patriotic fervor of the early days of the war, more men volunteered than Iowa's single regiment could contain. Ten companies were chosen to compose the infantry regiment, each with a minimum of 78 men; two companies each were taken from Des Moines County, Muscatine County, and Dubuque County, with single companies from Johnson County, Linn County, Henry County, and Scott County. The basis for these companies were pre-existing local militia units. A number of the soldiers were immigrants, with three companies being predominantly German and another Irish. Most of the men enlisted out of a desire to put down a rebellion against the United States government, and not out of abolitionist sentiment.

While the companies had been admitted to federal service by local officials upon their formation, regimental organization officially occurred on May 11, after the men had gathered at Keokuk, Iowa. That same day, the regiment held an election for officers. John F. Bates was elected colonel, William H. Merritt as lieutenant colonel, and Asbury B. Porter as major. The regiment mustered in three days later, to serve for a term of three months, although the regiment believed that their term of service had an earlier beginning date than what the federal government considered it to be. The total number of men enrolled in the regiment was 959. The First Iowa remained in Keokuk into June, although the regiment trained as individual companies instead of as an entire regiment until late May. Uniforms for the regiment were homemade and were not consistent throughout the unit: the shirts worn by the men varied in type and were a mixture of black, white, grey, and various shades of blue and blue-grey, while the pants could be pink, black, grey, or blue-grey.

=== Joining Lyon ===
The regiment was ordered to head to Missouri and join the forces of Brigadier General Nathaniel Lyon on June 13. Lyon was leading a multi-pronged offensive in Missouri, with his men clearing the pro-Confederate Missouri State Guard out of the Missouri River Valley, while other forces moved into southern Missouri to discourage Confederate involvement from Arkansas and to block the retreat of the forces Lyon had driven south. At the time they left Keokuk, the men were armed with antiquated flintlocks that had been converted to use the percussion cap system. The next day, the regiment arrived at Hannibal, Missouri, where it guarded the Hannibal and St. Joseph Railroad from pro-Confederate bushwhackers. Continuing on to Macon City on June 15, some of the men briefly took over a pro-Confederate newspaper. On June 16, the 1st Iowa traveled to Renick by train, and then began a march to Boonville, where the men joined Lyon's main force on June 20 or June 21. During the march to Boonville, the regiment encountered several fugitive slaves: six were returned to their masters, and another one was driven from the camp.

Lyon's advance from Boonville to join forces with the southern prong of his offensive was delayed by logistical issues. During the time at Boonville, the Iowans interacted in camp with some of Lyon's United States Regulars, taking a dislike to the stricter discipline of the Regular Army units. In one incident, violence almost broke out between the Iowans and some of the Regulars over objections to a Regular soldiers being bound and gagged as a punishment. The regiment drilled heavily while at Boonville, but the unit's status as volunteer troops led to Lyon, a Regular, disliking the unit, which returned the feelings. Early on the morning on July 3, Lyon's command advanced out of Boonville. One day on the march, the Iowans were placed at the rear of the column, and intentionally marched quickly, forcing the Regulars ahead of them to speed up and causing many of the Regulars to wear out and straggle behind. On another day, the Iowans were in the front of the column, and would march quicker than the Regulars, causing Lyon to have to order them to stop whenever the gap between them and the Regulars would grow too great. During the marches, the men of the 1st Iowa sang "The Happy Land of Canaan", a 217-verse ditty that was particularly popular with the unit.

On July 7, Lyon's men reached Clinton, where his force was supplemented by men commanded by Major Samuel Sturgis. Lyon's reinforced command made difficult crossings of the Grand River at Clinton and then the Osage River at Osceola. On July 9, Lyon learned of the Battle of Carthage, in which Colonel Franz Sigel's federal forces had been defeated by the Missouri State Guard, a state militia unit. Lyon reached Springfield on July 13, with his command following in bits and pieces over the next several days. Aware of a Missouri State Guard camp at Forsyth, Lyon ordered a strike against it. Captain Thomas W. Sweeny led a 1,200 man force towards Forsyth, beginning on July 20. The command included 550 men, in six companies, from the 1st Iowa, led by Merritt. Reaching Forsyth on July 22, the command drove off a small opposing force in a minor skirmish and then looted the town. During the skirmish, the Iowans supported an artillery unit. Sweeny's men returned to Springfield on July 25.

=== Wilson's Creek and mustering out ===
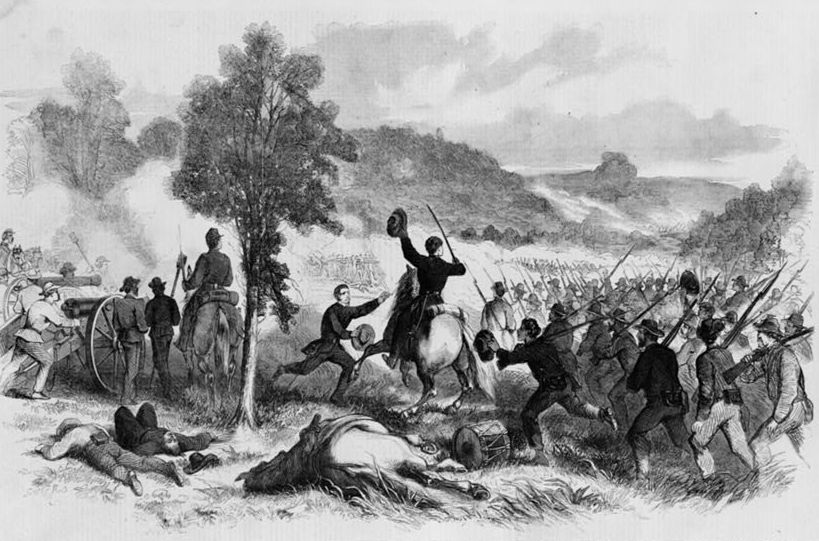
An 1861 depiction of Lyon leading the 1st Iowa at Wilson's Creek, shortly before his death.

Meanwhile, components of the Missouri State Guard under Major General Sterling Price had combined forces with a Confederate army led by Brigadier General Benjamin McCulloch. This combined force began an advance towards Springfield on July 31. Lyon, unaware that Price and McCulloch had joined forces, began an advance from Springfield on August 1, hoping to defeat in detail the Confederates and Missouri State Guardsmen. On August 2, a portion of Lyon's command routed some Missouri State Guard cavalry in the Battle of Dug Springs. Two companies of the 1st Iowa were present at Dug Springs, being aligned on the right of the command. Having learned that McCulloch and Price had combined, Lyon ordered a withdrawal to Springfield on August 4.

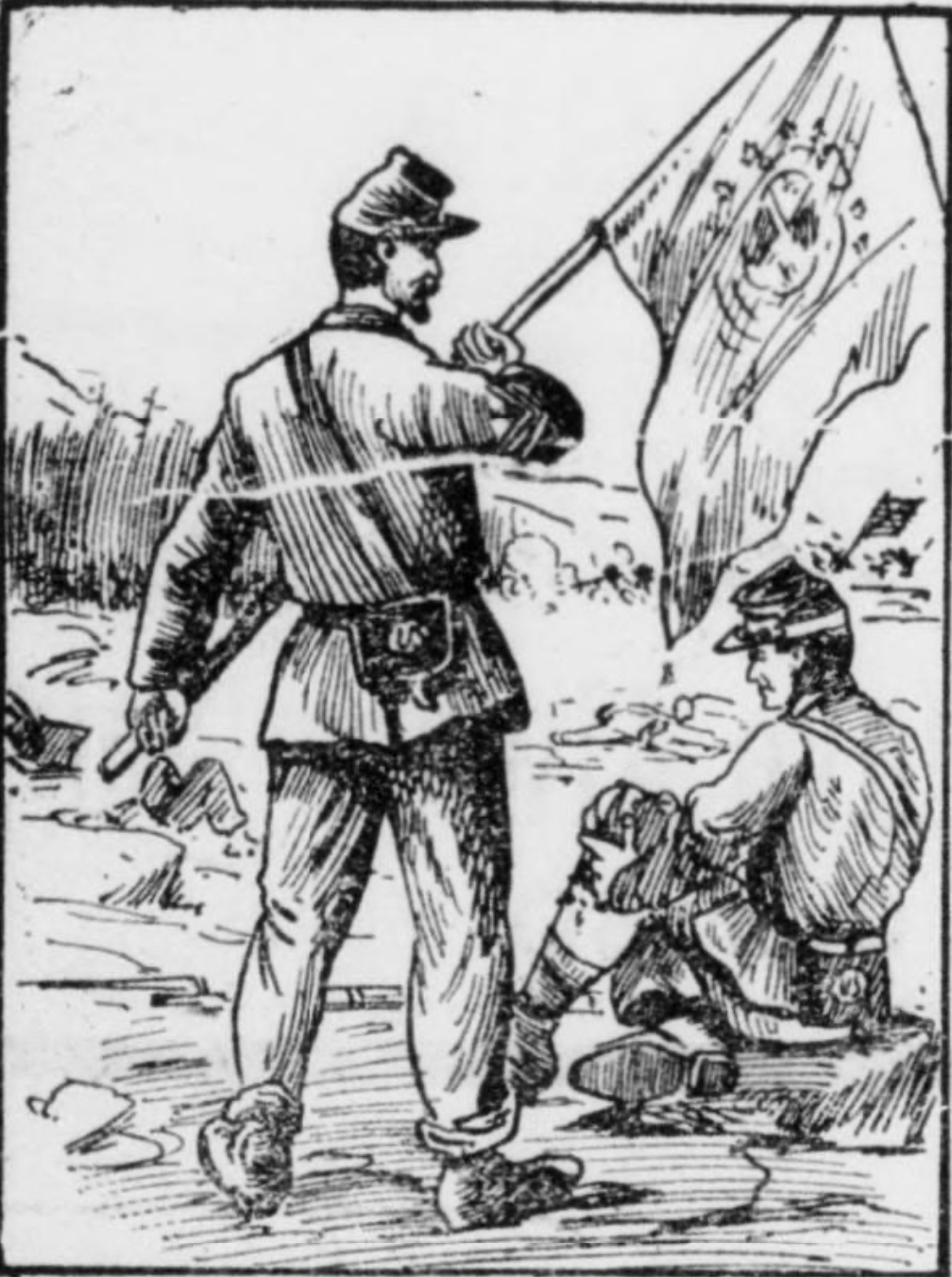
1904 illustration of Sergeant Jim Grant carrying company C's flag at Wilson's Creek.

On August 6, the regiment believed that its term of enlistment had expired, believing that its term of service began when it was placed into service by Iowa authorities. The regiment held a vote that resulted in a decision to remain in the service, as a battle was about to occur. Instead, the units term of service was actually calculated from the date of its mustering in to federal service, with the true expiration of enlistment being August 14. McCulloch and Price camped their forces along Wilson's Creek, and after much urging from Price, McCulloch decided on August 9 to attack Lyon in Springfield the next day. Lyon, in turn, had decided to attack as well, despite being outnumbered. For the upcoming battle, the Iowans were placed in Lyon's 4th Brigade, which was commanded by Colonel George Dietzler. The 4th Brigade, along with the 1st and 3rd Brigades, advanced with Lyon, while the 2nd Brigade moved with Sigel to strike the enemy position in the rear. Merritt led the regiment into battle, as Bates was left sick in Springfield. As the federals moved out on the evening of August 9, the Iowans sang loudly on the march, which made Lyon worried that the men would not fight well due to levity.

Lyon's attack surprised the Confederate camp on the morning of August 10, bringing on the Battle of Wilson's Creek. The federal soldiers encountered Missouri State Guard cavalry, and one man from the 1st Iowa was killed during the encounter. While the 1st Missouri Infantry Regiment, the 1st Kansas Infantry Regiment, and some artillery fought the cavalry, the 1st Iowa and the rest of Lyon's wing moved onto a prominence known as Bloody Hill. Lyon's men encountered another enemy cavalry unit, and unaware of the Confederate and Missouri State Guard positions, Lyon formed up a position on Bloody Hill, with the Iowans on the left flank. While Lyon held Bloody Hill, Sigel was defeated by a Confederate and Missouri State Guard attack. The Iowans played an indirect role in the fighting on Sigel's front: some of the Iowans were wearing gray uniforms, and when Sigel's men were faced by gray-clad Confederates of the 3rd Louisiana Infantry Regiment, they thought they were facing the Iowans and did not fire at first.

On Bloody Hill, Lyon's men repulsed an attack, but during a second enemy charge, the 1st Iowa, less two companies fighting as skirmishers on the left, was transferred from the left to a position supporting the 1st Kansas. After moving to the new position, the Iowans and 1st Missouri became somewhat disorganized, with two companies of the Iowans become commingled with the Missourians. Merritt ordered the regiment to withdraw, which both cut off the two companies with the Missourians from the rest of the regiment and opened a gap in Lyon's line. Merritt rode over to the isolated companies and maneuvered them over to the rest of the regiment, while Lyon ordered Sweeny to lead the 1st Iowa forward during Merritt's temporary absence. Lyon then began to lead the 2nd Kansas Infantry Regiment forward from a reserve role, but was shot dead. Sturgis took command after the death of Lyon, while the defeat of Sigel allowed Price and McCulloch to concentrate a larger force against Lyon than before. This stronger attack was repulsed, as well.

After this, Sturgis decided to withdraw, with his men outnumbered, running out of ammunition, and not knowing what had happened to Sigel. During the retreat from the field, men from the 1st Iowa helped rescue a federal artillery caisson, and Private Nicholas Bouquet of the 1st Iowa received the Medal of Honor for his actions in this incident. The 1st Iowa had taken about 800 men into the battle, and had 12 men killed, 138 wounded, and 4 missing in action. Sturgis withdrew his force back to Rolla via Springfield. One member of the 1st Iowa estimated that the regiment had marched 620 miles (1,000 km) from the time they reached Renick to the arrival at Rolla. At Rolla, the 1st Iowa received new gray uniforms, and then to St. Louis, where they were discharged. The historians William Garrett Piston and Richard W. Hatcher report that the discharge occurred on August 23, while Dyer's Compendium dates it on August 20. After their discharge, the Iowans were transported by steamboats from St. Louis to Burlington, Iowa, from whence the men returned to their homes. According to Dyer, the 1st Iowa had 20 men killed in action or mortally wounded during its existence, with another eight dying of natural causes. At least 600 veterans of the regiment reenlisted in other units, and two, Francis J. Herron and Charles L. Matthies became general officers during the war.

== See also ==
- List of Iowa Civil War Units
- Iowa in the American Civil War
