= Michael Cataldo =

American politician (born 1965)

Member of the Iowa House of Representatives
- In office January 11, 1993 – January 7, 2001
- Preceded by: Linda Beatty
- Succeeded by: Jack Hatch

Personal details
- Born: June 10, 1965 (age 61) Des Moines, Iowa, United States
- Party: Democratic
- Occupation: Businessman

Michael J. Cataldo (born June 10, 1965) is an American politician in the state of Iowa.

He was born in Des Moines, Iowa. He attended the American Institute of Business and is a businessman. He served in the Iowa House of Representatives from 1993 to 2001, serving the 68th district as a Democrat.
