= Ira Cook =

American businessman and politician

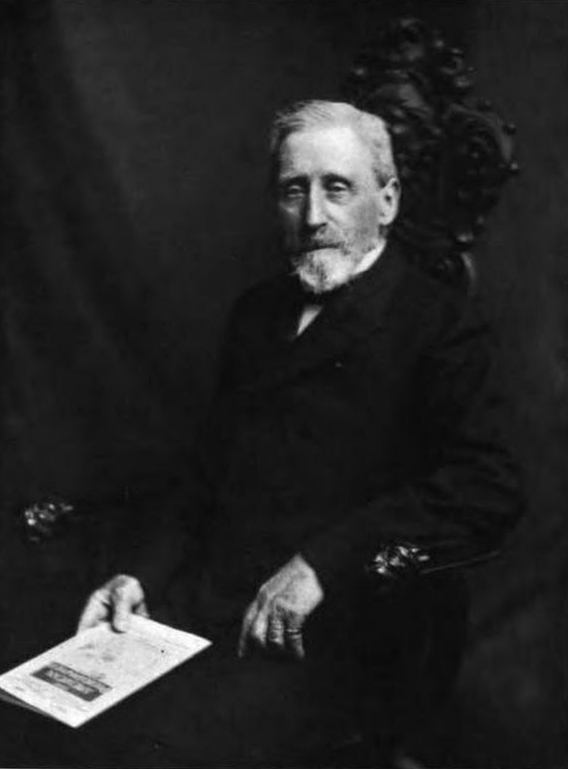
- Ira Cook of Des Moines, Iowa, depicted for his biography in the 1908 book Pioneers of Polk County, Iowa; And Reminiscences of Early Days

Mayor of Des Moines
- In office 1861–1862

Personal details
- Born: October 6, 1821 Union, New York, US
- Died: March 11, 1902 (aged 80)
- Spouse: Mary C. Owens (m. 1854)

Ira Cook (October 6, 1821 - March 11, 1902) was an American surveyor, mayor, banker, tax collector, city council member, investor and entrepreneur from Des Moines, Iowa.

== Background ==
Cook was born October 6, 1821, in the Town of Union, Broome County, New York. His father, one sister and her husband moved to Iowa in 1835 and settled on land in what is now Davenport. Ira and the remainder of his family moved to Iowa in the spring of 1836. He lived in Tipton, Iowa, from 1838 to 1841, working on the family farm and having the chance to meet then Iowa Territorial Governor Robert Lucas.

== Early career ==
In 1849, he teamed with John Evans on a contract which began his four-plus year career as a government surveyor. After leaving his surveying career and Davenport, Cook moved to Des Moines in 1855 and entered the banking business with the firm of Cook, Sargent & Cook.

He married Mary C. Owens on April 25, 1854. He and his wife were given a three-year-old girl to care for by the child's father in 1857. Fearful that they might lose the child due to provisions in her father's will, Cook consulted with John A. Kasson, then practicing law in Des Moines. Together they drafted a bill concerning the adoption of children in Iowa. When the bill passed, the Cooks promptly adopted the little girl, raising her as their own. Mary gave birth to a daughter of their own on June 5, 1859, Rachel Faxton Cook, and their second child was Carrie L. Cook.

== Mayoralty, Washington and return ==
He was elected mayor of Des Moines, Iowa, in 1861 and resigned not long after. Beginning in 1860 he engaged in insurance and real estate with C. C. Dawson. He moved to Washington, D.C., in 1862 and assumed a position in the Post Office Department. He took a position as a Deputy United States Revenue Collector in 1864. In 1866, he moved back to Des Moines and was elected to two terms on the city council.

== Investments ==
In 1875, he became a stockholder in the Iowa Loan and Trust Company, one of the most important financial institutions in the State of Iowa at the time. In 1880, he was elected one of Iowa Loan and Trust Companies trustees. In 1896, he partnered with G. M. Hippee and others to form the Des Moines Syrup Refining Company, which operated to make syrup, sugar, and glucose from corn.

Cook wrote a number of articles that were published in different newspapers in the state. He wrote "Government Surveying in Early Iowa", published in the January 1897, issue of The Annals of Iowa.

== Death ==
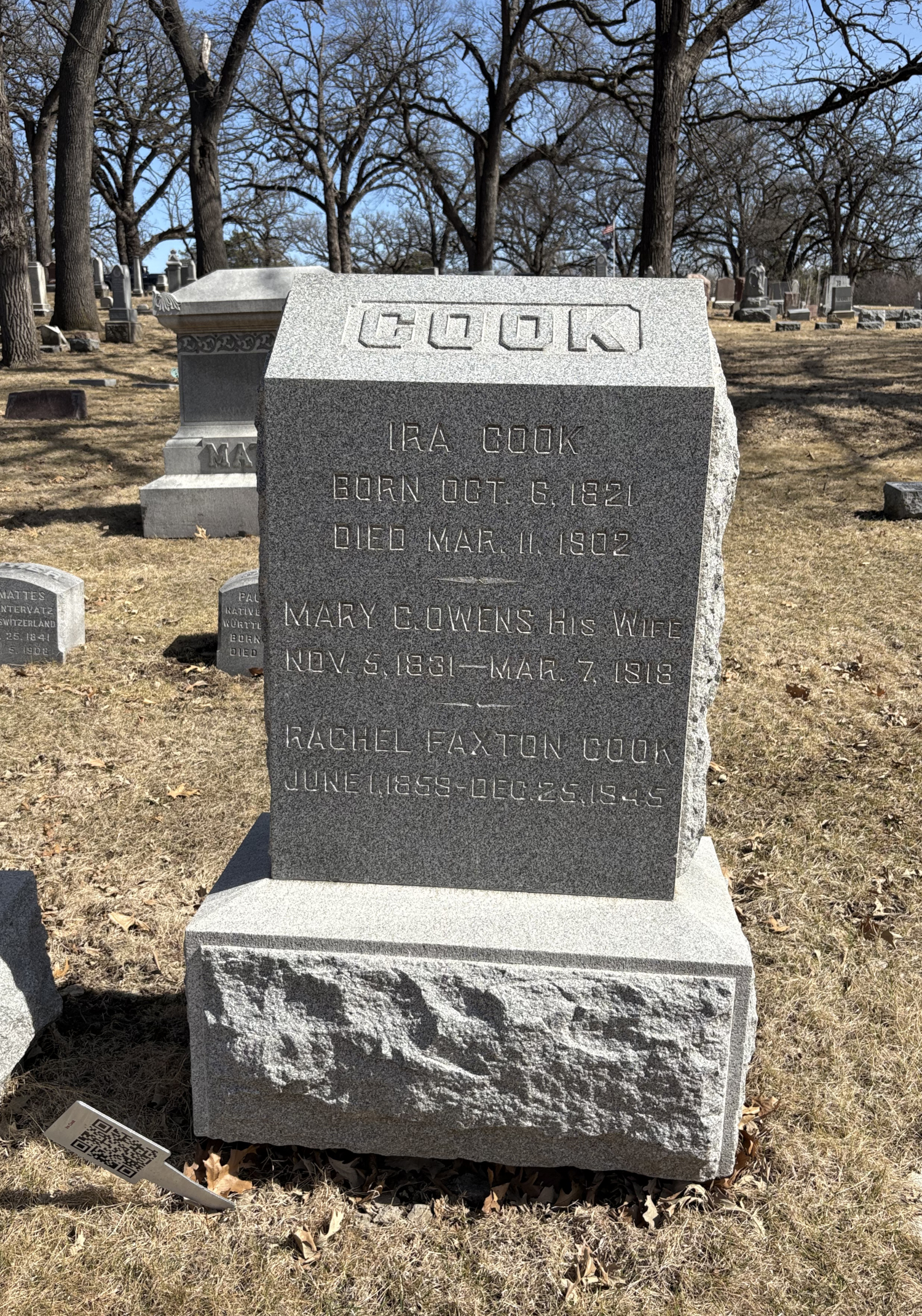
Cook's grave at Woodland Cemetery

He died March 11, 1902 and was buried in Woodland Cemetery in Des Moines. Visitors to the State Historical Museum in Des Moines will find Ira Cook featured in the "You Gotta Know the Territory" exhibit.
