= List of mayors of Des Moines, Iowa =

The following is a list of the mayors of Des Moines, Iowa.

== List of mayors ==
Image	Mayor	Term start and end	Political party	Notes
	Thompson Bird	1851 – 1852		
	Benjamin Luce	October 1853 – 1854		
	Lampson P. Sherman	1854–1855		
	Barlow Granger	November 1855 – 1856		
	William DeFord	November 1856 – 1857		
	Charles W. Nash	1857 – May 1, 1857		
	William H. McHenry	May 1, 1857 – 1858	Democratic	
	H. E. Lemoreaux	1858–1859		
	R. L. Tidrick	1859–1860		
	P. H. W. Latshaw	1860–1861	Republican	
	Ira Cook	1861	Republican	Resigned from office
	W. S. Barnes	1861–1862	Republican	
	Thomas Cavanagh	1862–1863	Democratic	
	William H. Leas	1863–1865	Republican	
	George W. Cleveland	1865–1868	Republican	
	Sumner F. Spofford	1868–1869		
	Joshua H. Hatch	1869–1871	Republican	
	Martin Tuttle	1871–1872		
	J. P. Foster	1872–1873	Republican	
	Giles H. Turner	1873 – March 16, 1874	Republican	
	A. Newton	March 16, 1874 – 1876	Republican	
	Giles H. Turner (2nd term)	March 1876 – 1877	Republican	Resigned from office
	George Sneer	1877–1880		
	William H. Merritt	1880–1882		
	P. V. Carey	1882 – March 15, 1886	Republican	
	James Harvey Phillips	March 15, 1886 – 1888		
	William Lytle Carpenter	1888 – March 17, 1890	Democratic	
	John H. Campbell	March 17, 1890 – April 18, 1892	Republican	
	C. C. Lane	April 18, 1892 – April 16, 1894	Republican	
	Isaac L. Hillis	April 16, 1894 – 1896	Republican	
	John MacVicar	1896 – April 2, 1900		
	Jeremiah J. Hartenbower	April 2, 1900 – 1902	Democratic	
	James M. Brenton	1902–1904		
	George W. Mattern	1904 – April 6, 1908		
	Adoniram Judson Mathis	April 6, 1908 – April 4, 1910		
	James R. Hanna	April 4, 1910 – April 3, 1916		
	John MacVicar	April 3, 1916 – 1918		
	Thomas Fairweather	1918–1920		
	H. H. Barton	1920–1922		
	C. M. Garver	1922 – April 5, 1926		
	Fred H. Hunter	April 5, 1926 – April 2, 1928		
	John MacVicar†	April 2, 1928 – November 15, 1928		Died in office
	E. H. Mulock	November 24, 1928 – 1930		
	Parker L. Crouch	1930–1932		
	Dwight N. Lewis	1932–1936		
	Joseph Holmes Allen	1936–1938		
	Dwight N. Lewis†	1938 – May 1, 1938		Died in office
	Mark L. Conkling	1938–1942		
	John MacVicar Jr.	1942–1948		
	Heck Ross	1948–1950		
	A. B. Chambers	1950–1952		
	Allan W. Denny	1952–1954		
	Joseph Van Dresser	1954–1956		
	Ray Mills	1956–1958		
	Charles F. Iles	1958–1960		
	Reinhold O. Carlson	1960–1962		
	Charles F. Iles	1962–1966		
	George C. Whitmer	1966–1968		
	Thomas N. Urban	1968–1972		
	Richard E. Olson	1972–1980		
	Pete Crivaro†	1980 – December 24, 1986		Died in office
	George Nahas	January 7, 1987 – April 15, 1987		Long term former councilmember appointed by the city council on January 7, 1987, to serve as mayor until the November election. Prior to that, local citizens secured sufficient votes to force a special election. Nahas served four months as mayor. First Lebanese mayor.
	John "Pat" Dorrian	April 15, 1987 – 1995		Won a special election on April 14, 1987, and sworn on April 15, 1987. Reelected in the November 1987 general election.
	Arthur Davis†	1995–1997		Died in office
	Robert D. Ray	1997	Republican	Former governor. Served as interim mayor after the death of Davis.
	Preston Daniels	1997–2004	Democratic	First African American mayor
	Frank Cownie	2004–2024		
	Connie Boesen	January 2, 2024 – Present		

== See also ==
- Des Moines City Council

== Notes ==
=== Works cited ===
- The History of Polk County, Iowa. Union Historical Company. 1880. pp. 670–676.
- Dixon, J. M (1876). Centennial history of Polk County, Iowa. Des Moines State Register, Print. p. 259.
- Revised Ordinances of the City of Des Moines. Register & Tribune Company. 1916. pp. 43–60.
- "Local goverment [sic]; Mayors of noteworthy cities of the United States". Notable names in American history; a tabulated register. James T. White & Co. 1973. p. 453. ISBN 0-88371-002-1.
