= Hutchinson Homestead =

Historic house in New York, United States

- U.S. National Register of Historic Places
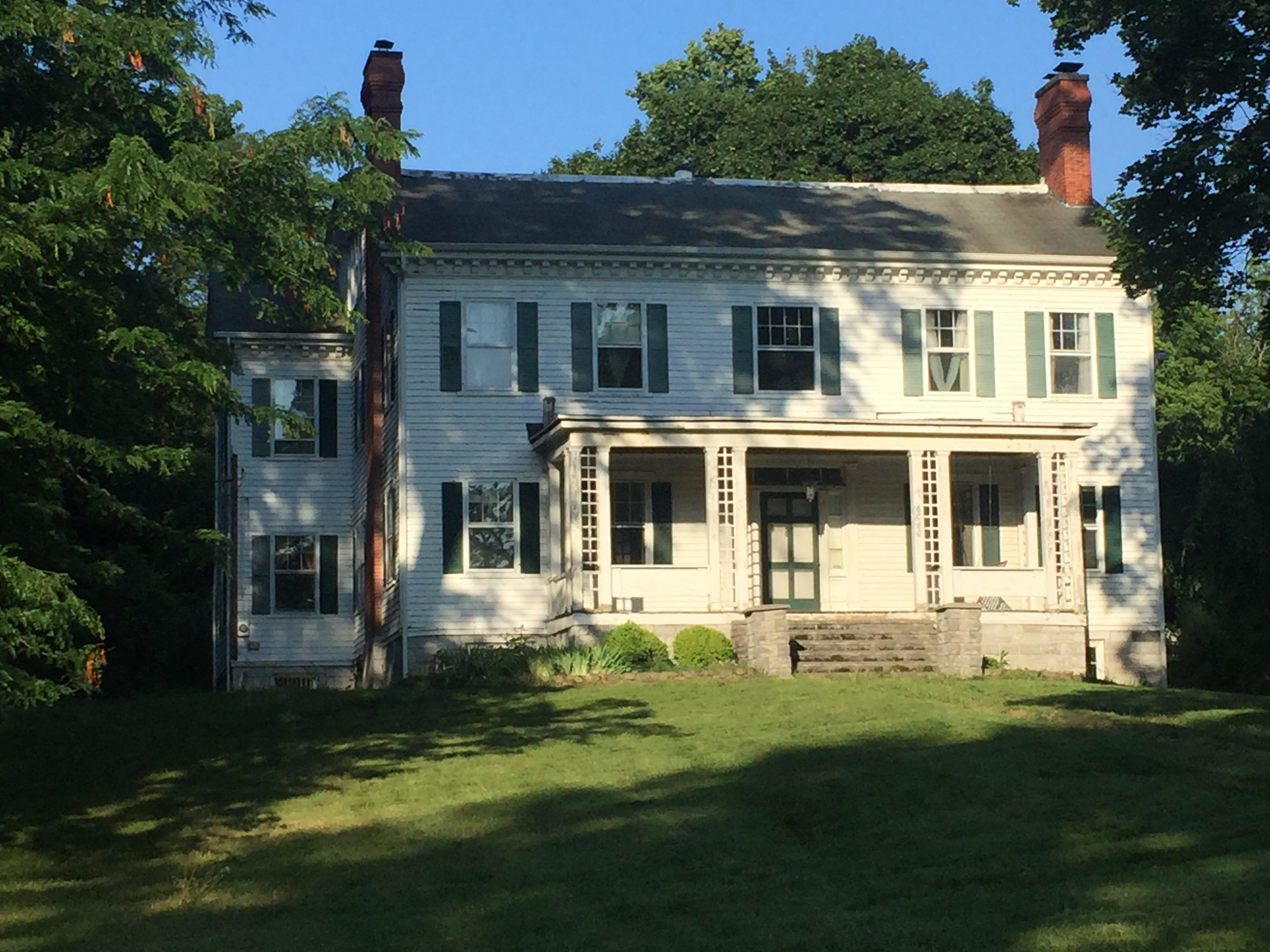
- House in 2022

- Location within New York Location within the United States
- Location: 6080 Lake St., Cayuga, New York
- Coordinates: 42.91209°N 76.72626°W
- Area: 4.75 acres (1.92 ha)
- Built: 1910
- Built by: Scofield, Levi
- Architectural style: Colonial Revival
- NRHP reference No.: 09000478
- Added to NRHP: September 9, 2009

Hutchinson Homestead is a historic home located at Cayuga in Cayuga County, New York. It was built about 1910 and is a two-story, five-bay, center-hall frame dwelling in the Colonial Revival style. It is surmounted by a low-pitched gambrel roof pierced by four brick chimneys.

It was listed on the National Register of Historic Places in 2009.
