= 2015 Des Moines mayoral election =

Des Moines mayoral election, 2015
- November 3, 2015
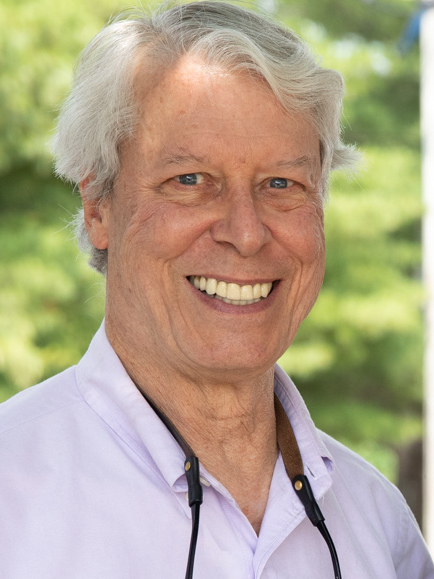

Candidate	Frank Cownie	Anthony Taylor
Party	Democratic	Nonpartisan
Popular vote	6,134	1,438
Percentage	80.16%	18.79%
Mayor before election
Frank Cownie
Democratic
Elected mayor
Frank Cownie
Democratic

The 2015 Des Moines mayoral election was held on November 3, 2015, to elect the mayor of Des Moines, Iowa. It saw Frank Cownie win reelection.

== Results ==
Results
Party	Candidate	Votes	%
Democratic	Frank Cownie (incumbent)	6,134	80.16
Nonpartisan	Anthony Taylor	1,438	18.79
Write-in		80	1.05
Total votes		7,652	
Democratic hold			
