= John MacVicar (mayor) =

American politician (1859–1928)

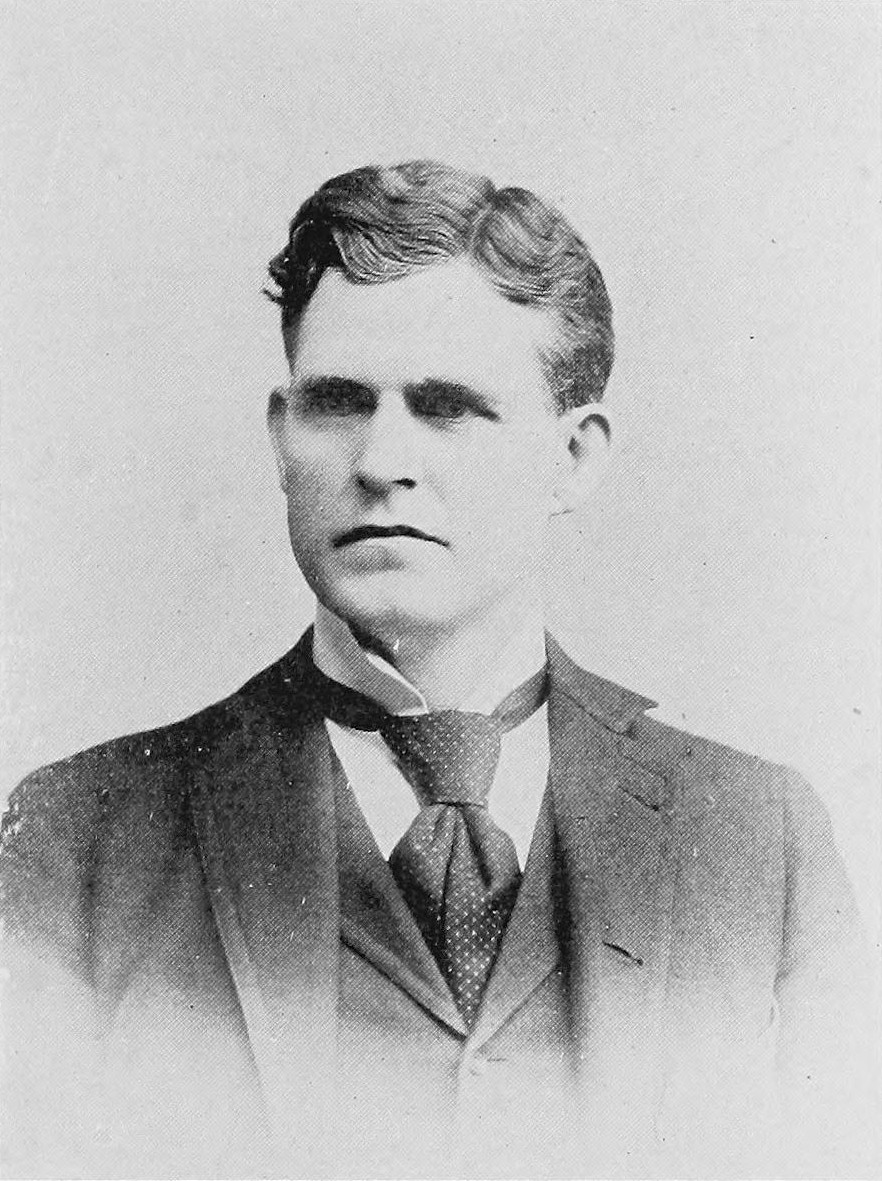

Mayor of Des Moines
- In office 1928 – November 15, 1928
- Preceded by: Fred H. Hunter
- Succeeded by: E. H. Mulock
- In office 1916–1918
- Preceded by: James R. Hanna
- Succeeded by: Thomas Fairweather
- In office 1896–1900
- Preceded by: Isaac L. Hillis
- Succeeded by: Jeremiah J. Hartenbower

Member of the Des Moines City Commission
- In office 1908–1912
- Preceded by: Office established

Personal details
- Born: July 4, 1859 Galt, Canada West
- Died: November 15, 1928 (aged 69) Des Moines, Iowa, United States
- Party: Republican
- Spouse: Nettie Nash

John MacVicar (July 4, 1859 – November 15, 1928) was an American politician who served as mayor of Des Moines, Iowa from 1896 to 1900 and from 1916 to 1918 and again in 1928 until his death.

== Early life ==
MacVicar was born on July 4, 1859, in Galt, Canada West, to Mary (née McEwan) and John MacVicar. Shortly after with his family he moved to Guelph, Canada West and when he was nine years old they moved to Erie, Pennsylvania, where he attended public schools until he was thirteen years old. After his mother's death he went to work selling newspapers and attended night school. in 1882 MacVicar moved to Des Moines, Iowa and in 1884 he was married to Nettie Nash.

== Career ==
In 1888 MacVicar was elected town recorder of North Des Moines and a year later was elected mayor. North Des Moines was annexed to Des Moines in 1890. In 1892 he participated in a campaign against the high rates charged by the Des Moines Water Works Company. In 1896 he was elected mayor of Des Moines and was reelected in 1898, in the 1900 election he was defeated by Jeremiah J. Hartenbower. In 1908 MacVicar was elected to the Des Moines City Commission and served from 1908 to 1912. He was again elected mayor, in 1916 and 1928.

== Death ==
MacVicar died on November 15, 1928, at his home in Des Moines
