= 2003 Des Moines mayoral election =

Des Moines mayoral election, 2003
- October 7, 2003 (first round); November 4, 2003 (runoff)
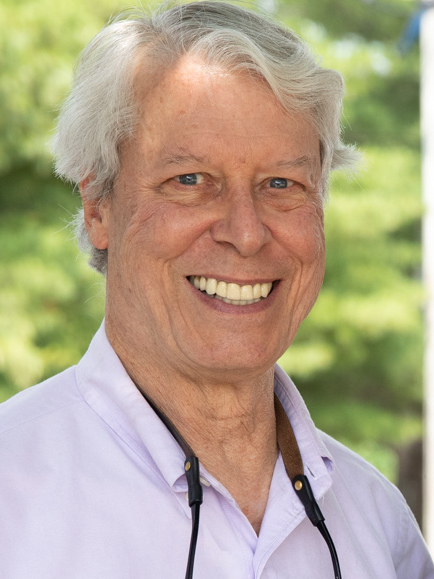

Candidate	Frank Cownie	Chris Hensley
Party	Democratic	Republican
First-round vote	4,330	7,301
First-round percentage	21.67%	36.53%
Second-round vote	16,581	13,848
Second-round percentage	54.21%	45.27%
Candidate	Mark McCormick	Gayle Collins
Party	Democratic	Democratic
First-round vote	4,298	3,456
First-round percentage	21.51%	17.29%
Mayor before election
Preston Daniels
Democratic
Elected mayor
Frank Cownie
Democratic

The 2003 Des Moines mayoral election was held on October 7, and November 4, 2003, to elect the mayor of Des Moines, Iowa, USA. Frank Cownie was elected.

== Results ==
=== First round ===
First round results
Party	Candidate	Votes	%
Republican	Christine Hensley	7,301	36.53
Democratic	Frank Cownie	4,330	21.67
Democratic	Mark McCormick	4,298	21.51
Democratic	Gayle Collins	3,456	17.29
Democratic	Peter M. Rose	388	1.94
Socialist Workers	Mary J. Martin	170	0.90
Write-in		33	0.17
Total votes		19,986	

=== Runoff ===
Runoff results
Party	Candidate	Votes	%
Democratic	Frank Cownie	16,581	54.21
Republican	Christine Hensley	13,848	45.27
Write-in		159	0.52
Total votes		30,588	
Democratic hold			
