= 2011 Des Moines mayoral election =

Des Moines mayoral election, 2011
- November 8, 2011
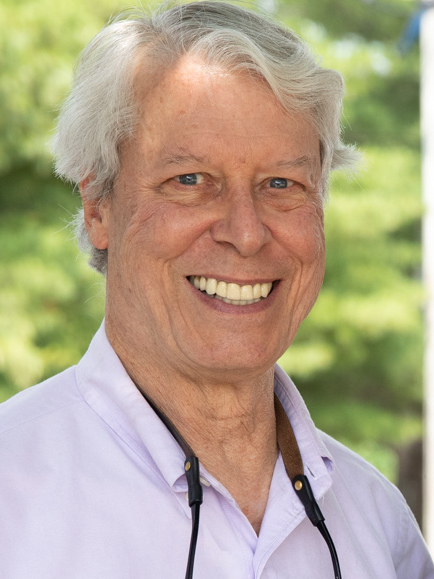
| Candidate | Frank Cownie |
| Party | Democratic |
| Popular vote | 4,363 |
| Percentage | 92.10% |
Mayor before election
Frank Cownie
Democratic
Elected mayor
Frank Cownie
Democratic

The 2011 Des Moines mayoral election was held on November 8, 2011, to elect the mayor of Des Moines, Iowa. It saw Frank Cownie win reelection, running unopposed.

== Results ==
Results
| Party | Candidate | Votes | % |
|---|---|---|---|
| Democratic | Frank Cownie (incumbent) | 4,363 | 92.10 |
| Write-in | | 374 | 7.90 |
| Total votes | 4,737 | | |
| Democratic hold | | | |
