= Farmington High School (Connecticut) =

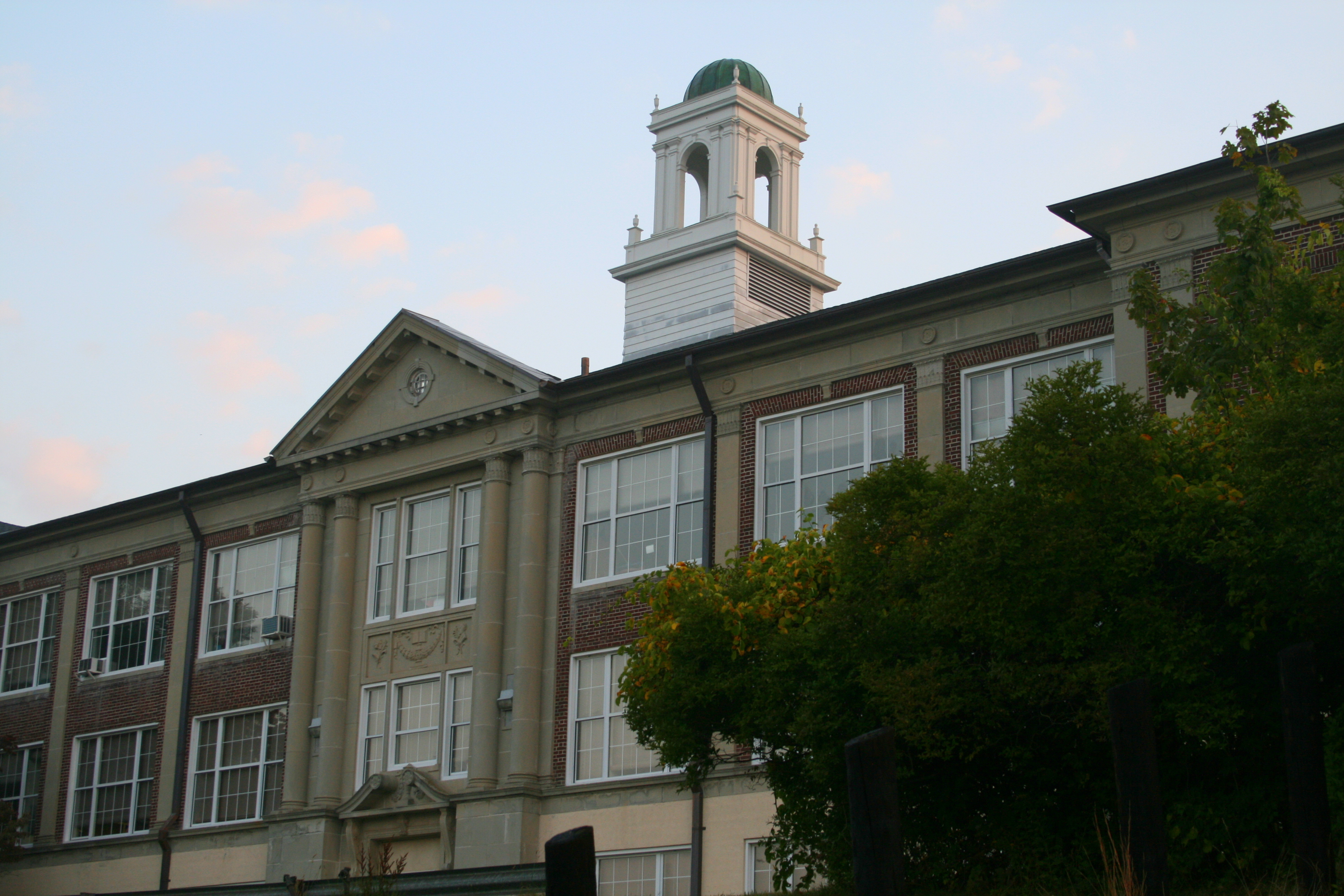

Location
- 10 Monteith Drive; Farmington, Connecticut 06032; United States; 41°45′02″N 72°52′04″W

Information
- Type: Public
- Founded: 1882 (144 years ago)
- School district: Farmington School District
- Superintendent: Kathleen C. Greider
- CEEB code: 070805
- NCES School ID: 090156000273
- Dean: Mary Lundquist
- Teaching staff: 105.90 (on an FTE basis)
- Grades: 9 - 12
- Enrollment: 1,287 (2023-2024)
- Student to teacher ratio: 12.15
- Colors: Maroon and white
- Slogan: One School, One Community, One Us
- Sports: Soccer, Basketball, Football, Swimming, Volleyball, Wrestling, Track & Field, Rowing
- Mascot: River Hawk
- Team name: River Hawks
- National ranking: 1. 472
- Budget: $76,674,261
- Website: www.fpsct.org/schools/fhs

Farmington High School is a public high school in Farmington, Connecticut, that serves grades 9-12.

In June 2017, a town vote to build a new school occurred. Advocates for the new building highlighted the severe aging and inadequacy of the existing facilities. Due to budgetary concerns, the vote did not pass. In June 2021, a subsequent referendum was held, with the proposed renovation estimated to cost $135.6 million; this referendum passed by a wide margin. Construction of the new school began in summer of 2022 and completed in August 2024.

== Athletics ==
=== CIAC State Championships ===
Team	Year
Boys soccer	1974, 1979, 1982, 1986, 1992, 1996, 2003, 2008, 2010, 2012, 2013, 2016, 2021, 2024
Girls volleyball	1966, 1967, 1968, 1969, 1970, 1972, 1979, 2014, 2023, 2024
Boys cross country	1971, 1972, 1973, 1974, 1989
Boys outdoor track	1970, 1973, 1982, 1983, 1985
Field hockey	1979, 1982, 1995, 1999
Girls soccer	1986, 2003, 2005
Baseball	1957, 1965, 1978
Girls gymnastics	1992, 1998
Girls Swimming	2008
Boys basketball	2019
Girls basketball	2013
Ice hockey	2005
Ice hockey (Farmington Valley Generals)	2018
Boys indoor track	1973
Girls golf	2010

== Notable alumni ==
- Tim Abromaitis, professional basketball player (Notre Dame)
- Nick Bonino, professional hockey player
- Michael Gladis actor (Mad Men)
- William H. Hatch, politician
- Shawn Haviland, professional baseball player
- Dick McAuliffe, professional baseball player
- Erin Pac, Olympic bobsledder
- Pawel Szajda, actor
- Terry Wooden, former linebacker in the NFL
