= Preston Daniels =

American politician

Preston A. Daniels

Mayor of Des Moines
- In office November 3, 1997 – January 5, 2004
- Preceded by: Robert D. Ray (interim)
- Succeeded by: Frank Cownie

Personal details
- Born: October 5, 1945 (age 80) Joliet, Illinois
- Party: Democratic
- Children: Preston A. Daniels II
- Education: Drake University
- Occupation: Politician, civic human rights leader

Preston A. Daniels is an American politician who became the first African-American mayor of Des Moines, Iowa.

== Early life and education ==
Preston Daniels served four years in the United States Army where he achieved the rank of sergeant. Daniels received his Bachelor of Science in psychology and his Master of Science in health science, both from Drake University, before he began his career at Employee and Family Resources (EFR) in Des Moines.

== Career ==
Prior to becoming mayor, he served in the Des Moines City Council from November 1991 until his election as mayor.

Daniels first became mayor upon his election in November 1997. In November 1999, he was elected to a four-year term. While serving as mayor, he hosted a local radio show. He did not seek another re-election and served out his term until January 2004. He was succeeded by Frank Cownie.

After leaving public office, he worked as the Program Director and Diversity Consultant for the Employee and Family Resource's Court and Community.

Daniels was appointed the director of the Iowa Department of Human Rights by Iowa governor Chet Culver in 2009 and served in that position until 2011.

== See also ==
- List of first African-American mayors

Preceded by Arthur Davis; Robert D. Ray (interim)	Mayor of Des Moines; 1997–2004	Succeeded by Frank Cownie
