= Iowa Law Review =

- Discipline: Law review
- Language: English
- Edited by: Jessica Pray Patel

Publication details
- Former name: Iowa Law Bulletin
- History: 1915-present
- Publisher: University of Iowa College of Law (United States)
- Frequency: 5/year

Standard abbreviations
- Bluebook: Iowa L. Rev.
- ISO 4: Iowa Law Rev.

Indexing
- ISSN: 0021-0552
- LCCN: 16027401
- OCLC no.: 1753893

Links
- Journal homepage

The Iowa Law Review is a law review published five times annually by the University of Iowa College of Law. It was established in 1915 as the Iowa Law Bulletin. It is ranked 14th among 1550 journals indexed in the W&L ranking. The journal has been student-edited since 1935.

== History ==
The Iowa Law Review has its origins in the Iowa Law Bulletin. The original Bulletin series was published from 1891 to 1900 by faculty. The Bulletin was reinstated in 1915, edited by both faculty members and students. It changed its name to Iowa Law Review in 1925, indicating that the journal's focus would be on Iowa legal issues, but "occasionally an article of general scope [would] appear." Indeed, it has published on topics of national and international law.

== Projects ==
In 1933, the Iowa Law Review became the first law review to publish a symposium (on administrative law), which was entitled "Administrative Law Based upon Legal Writings 1931-1933." Since then, the journal has continued to hold symposia on issues of national importance. Its most recent symposium was "The Economic Implications of Climate Change.

In 1968, the Iowa Law Review began the "Contemporary Studies Project". These projects were large-scale, usually empirically based, and often lasted for more than one year. Some of the projects have received national recognition and/or have affected legislation and judicial reforms in Iowa and around the country. An examples is Facts and Fallacies About Iowa Civil Commitment (Iowa Law Review 55:895, 1970; leading to a revision in 1975 of Iowa's civil commitment laws). Two studies (A Comparison of Iowans' Dispositive Preferences with Selected Provisions of the Iowa and Uniform Probate Codes, Iowa Law Review 63:1041, 1978; The Iowa Small Claims Court: an Empirical Analysis, Iowa Law Review 75:433, 1990) have been widely cited and relied upon in law review articles and by courts throughout the US.

== Recognition ==
The Iowa Law Review has been widely cited for its legal research, theory, and analysis. Recent notable citations include the Iowa Supreme Court's citation of an Iowa Law Review student note in its April 2009 decision of Varnum v. Brien, which struck down the state's ban on gay marriage. Also, in its January 2010 decision of Citizens United v. FEC, the United States Supreme Court (Justices Scalia and Stevens in separate concurring opinions) cited Randall P. Bezanson, Institutional Speech, 80 Iowa Law Review 735, 775 (1995). Shortly thereafter the United States Supreme Court cited Jenny Roberts, Ignorance Is Effectively Bliss: Collateral Consequences, Silence, and Misinformation in the Guilty-Plea Process, 95 Iowa Law Review 119, 124 n.15 (2009), in its March 2010 decision of Padilla v. Kentucky. The Review receives cultural recognition, as well; John Oliver cited Guyora Binder & Alexandra Harrington, Racially Disparate and Disproportionate Punishment of Felony Murder: Evidence from New York, 110 Iowa Law Review 1055 (2025), in an episode of Last Week Tonight.

== Alumni ==
=== Iowa Supreme Court Justices ===
- Thomas D. Waterman, served as associate editor for volume 69.
- Christopher McDonald, served as associate editor for volume 86.

=== Iowa Court of Appeals Judges ===
- Samuel Langholz, served as managing editor for volume 93.
