= Rick Olson =

Rick Olson may refer to:

- Rick Olson (Iowa politician) (born 1951), Iowa state representative
- Rick Olson (Michigan politician) (born 1949), member of the Michigan House of Representatives
