= Mark McCormack (footballer) =

Irish footballer

Mark McCormack (born 30 December 1974) is an Irish former footballer who played as a midfielder.

He joined Shamrock Rovers from Stella Maris in 1993 and made his debut on 3 April 1994 as Rovers sealed their 15th League Championship. He made one appearance for the Hoops in the UEFA Cup in 1994.

As of October 2020, he was the Under 8 A and Nursery Coach for Corduff F.C.

== Honours ==
- Shamrock Rovers Young Player of the Year: 1994–95
