= Richard Olson (politician) =

American politician (1929–2014)

Mayor of Des Moines
- In office 1972–1979
- Preceded by: Thomas N. Urban
- Succeeded by: Peter Crivaro

Personal details
- Born: August 3, 1929 Aurora, Illinois
- Died: August 5, 2014 (aged 85) Dedham, Maine
- Party: Republican
- Spouse: Cleojean Olson

Richard Elmer Olson (August 3, 1929 – August 5, 2014) was an American politician and insurance executive who served as the Mayor of Des Moines, Iowa, for two consecutive terms from 1972 until 1979.

Olson is widely credited with spearheading the ongoing redevelopment and rebirth of downtown Des Moines during his tenure as the city's mayor. Downtown Des Moines, the capital and largest city in Iowa, had suffered from neglect and blight by the 1970s. Olson oversaw much of the "first wave" of the downtown's redevelopment. He was an early proponent of Des Moines' skywalk. Olson also supported the construction and development of numerous city landmarks, including the Greater Des Moines Botanical Garden, Civic Center of Greater Des Moines, the renovation of the riverfront, and Cowles Commons (formerly known as Nollen Plaza). Olson successfully persuaded the city's political and business communities to support his redevelopment efforts, including developer and Iowa Realty founder, Bill Knapp. In 2014, Knapp called Olson "the spark plug to get things rolling" for downtown Des Moines.

== Biography ==
Olson was born on August 3, 1929, in Aurora, Illinois, to Elmer Olson and Dalla (née Bargholz) Olson. He graduated from West Aurora High School in 1947. He next graduated from Drake University in 1951, where he was a member Drake Bulldogs football team.

Olson worked as an agency manager at the Des Moines office of The Bankers Life, an insurance company now Principal Financial Group, for 30 years. He joined Bankers Life in 1960 when he was 29 years old, becoming the youngest manager in the company's history. Olson was inducted into the Iowa Insurance Hall of Fame in 1999.

Olson was a member of the Republican Party, but eschewed partisan politics. He served on the Des Moines City Council before becoming mayor. In 1971, Olson was elected Mayor of Des Moines, defeating his opponent, public servant Peter Crivaro. He served for two, consecutive four-year terms.

He was once approached by the Democratic Party, who tried to persuade him to switch parties and run for Governor of Iowa as a Democrat. Olson declined the offer. His wife, Cleojean Olson, recalled joking, ""I told him, 'If you run, you'll run divorced'."

Olson served as the chairman of the United States Olympic Committee for eight states in the American Midwest from 1984 until 2002. He also founded the Des Moines chapter of Big Brothers of America.

== Death ==
Olson was killed in a car accident in Dedham, Maine, on the evening of August 5, 2014. He was 85 years old. Olson was returning to his Maine vacation home, after spending much of the day at a casino in Bangor, when his Chevrolet Tahoe crossed the center line and struck an oncoming GMC pickup truck shortly before 6 p.m. on August 5. The two people in the pickup truck, Roxanne Papken, 25, and Phillip Carter, 32, both of Bangor, Maine, were also killed. Olson, who had been seen drinking at a nearby restaurant just before the crash, had a blood alcohol content of 0.14, nearly twice the legal limit, and was driving 76 miles per hour, 21 miles per hour over the speed limit. Olson was survived by his wife, Cleojean, and four children. Philip Carter was survived by a young daughter. Roxanne had had her wedding planned in a few weeks.
