= Terrace Hill =

Historic house in Iowa, United States

- U.S. National Register of Historic Places
- U.S. National Historic Landmark
- Terrace Hill in 2019

- Location within Iowa Location within the United States
- Location: 2300 Grand Avenue, Des Moines, Iowa
- Coordinates: 41°35′0″N 93°38′57″W
- Area: 8 acres (3.2 ha)
- Built: 1866–1869
- Architects: William W. Boyington, Jacob Weidenmann, JT Elletson
- Architectural style: Second Empire
- NRHP reference No.: 72000480 (NRHP); 03001036 (NHL)

Significant dates
- Added to NRHP: June 14, 1972
- Designated NHL: July 31, 2003

Terrace Hill, also known as Hubbell Mansion, Benjamin F. Allen House or the Iowa Governor's Mansion, is the official residence of the Governor of Iowa in the capital city of Des Moines.

An example of Second Empire architecture, the Terrace Hill gubernatorial residence sits on a hill overlooking downtown Des Moines and features a prominent 90-foot (27 m) tower. The house was designated a National Historic Landmark in 2003.

== History ==
Terrace Hill was built by Benjamin Franklin Allen, the first millionaire in Iowa, as a home for his family. The architect for this project was William Boyington, a popular Chicago architect. Construction began in 1866, and was finished in 1869. The total cost of the project was $250,000 for the Mansion, the Carriage House, the original furnishings, and about 30 acres (120,000 m^{2}) of land. The house had very modern features for its time, which included hot and cold running water, indoor restrooms, an elevator, and gas lights.

When the house was first built, it was on the western edge of Des Moines. However, the city expanded westward. As a result, Terrace Hill is now nearly in the center of the city.

In 1884, the mansion was bought by local Des Moines businessman F.M. Hubbell. The mansion was purchased for $60,000 from Benjamin Franklin Allen.

From the time Iowa became a state in 1846 until 1947, no official residence was provided for the governor aside from Governor William L. Harding (1917–1921). In 1947, Iowa purchased an old colonial style home to serve as the residence for the governor, but by 1970, a new home was needed to serve the needs of the governor and the state to host visiting dignitaries. At first, the Iowa government considered building a new home to serve as the governor's residence. The Hubbell family—the owners of Terrace Hill—then offered the home to the state for use as a residence for the governor and his family. In the fall of 1976, Robert D. Ray became the first governor to use Terrace Hill as his residence when he moved there with his wife Billie Ray and their three daughters. Governors Terry Branstad (1983–1999, 2011–2017), Tom Vilsack (1999–2007), Chet Culver (2007–2011), and Kim Reynolds (2017–present) have occupied Terrace Hill since then.

== Design information ==
An example of Second Empire architecture, the 18,000 square feet (1,600 m^{2}) Iowa gubernatorial residence sits on a hill overlooking downtown Des Moines. Terrace Hill's 90-foot (27 m) tower offers a commanding view of Des Moines. The building's characteristic Second Empire features include a steeply pitched mansard roof, open verandas, narrow paired windows, and bracketed eaves. The house was designated a National Historic Landmark in 2003.

Terrace Hill is located at 2300 Grand Avenue, south of Interstate 235. Most visitors stop first at the nearby Carriage House, which is used as a reception area for visitors who arrive to tour the home. The Carriage House also contains permanent and changing exhibits, including information about the home's previous owners, the Hubbell family.

=== First floor ===
The first floor of Terrace Hill is a formal area. The rooms on the first floor were used often for reception of important guests, a tradition which continues.

The vestibule is the entry area to the mansion. Formerly, a servant would greet guests in the vestibule. They would enter through two sets of doors there that weigh more than 200 pounds (90 kg) each.

From there, guests would be taken to the reception room. Guests would wait while their presence was announced to the owners, and the host or hostess would greet them in that room.

Across the hall is the drawing room. At one time it was used for weddings and funerals of the home's residents. Now the room is used for important events – which include entertaining of foreign dignitaries. The room also features a 7.5 foot (2.3 m) crystal chandelier, and handcarved, laminated, rosewood Belter furniture.

The music room was previously an entertainment room. Young women would usually play music in this room. The room features a Steinway "Music Room Grand" from 1869 – the same year the house was completed.

The dining room was used for formal dinners by the previous owners of the home. Today the dining room continues to be used for state dinners and receptions. Food served in the dining room is prepared in the kitchen in the basement.

The library was another important room on the first floor. It served originally as the gathering place for the men of the home, and as a storage place for knowledge. The room contains several interesting items, which include F. M. Hubbell's leather chair. Because he was just over 5 feet (1.5 m) tall, the chair sits close to the floor to accommodate him. There is also a portable gentleman's "desk", and a partners' table, where two people could work at once.

The sitting room was the family room during earlier times.

All of these rooms are connected by the main hall. The ceilings in the hall are 14.5 feet (4.4 m) tall. The main hall has carpets by Wilton. There are also a number of interesting portraits.

Outside there is a large porch that overlooks the downtown area. It is still used occasionally for parties.

=== Second floor ===
At the end of the main hall on the first floor, there is a grand staircase that leads up to the second floor, with a landing in between. At the landing between the first and second floors, there is a stained glass window. The window is often described as "garden in glass" and measures 9 by 13 feet (3 by 4 m). This window colors the landing and part of the staircase with colorful light. The window was added by F. M. Hubbell between 1884 and 1890.

After the landing, the staircase divides into two approaches to the second floor. Originally the second floor served as the bedrooms for most of the family. Now, the formal office of the governor is located on the second floor (their working office is located at the Capitol).

The First Gentleman's office is also located on the second floor. Their office is not normally part of tours because the office is used as a working office for writing speeches, scheduling appearances, and planning special events.

=== Third floor and basement ===
The Governor of Iowa and the First Family live in the private apartment on the third floor of the house. This floor is not open to tours.

The basement, like the third floor, is also not open to the public. A kitchen located in the basement prepares meals for special events. Also located in the basement is an Iowa State Patrol security office where an unspecified number of troopers assigned to the premises provide 24/7 protection to the governor of Iowa and Terrace Hill property.

== Tour information ==
Terrace Hill is open for guided tours Tuesdays through Saturdays at 10:30 am and 12:00 pm by reservation made 48 hours in advance. Terrace Hill's touring season is March through December.

== See also ==
- List of governors' residences in the United States
- List of National Historic Landmarks in Iowa
- National Register of Historic Places listings in Polk County, Iowa
