= William H. Merritt =

American politician and journalist (1820–1891)

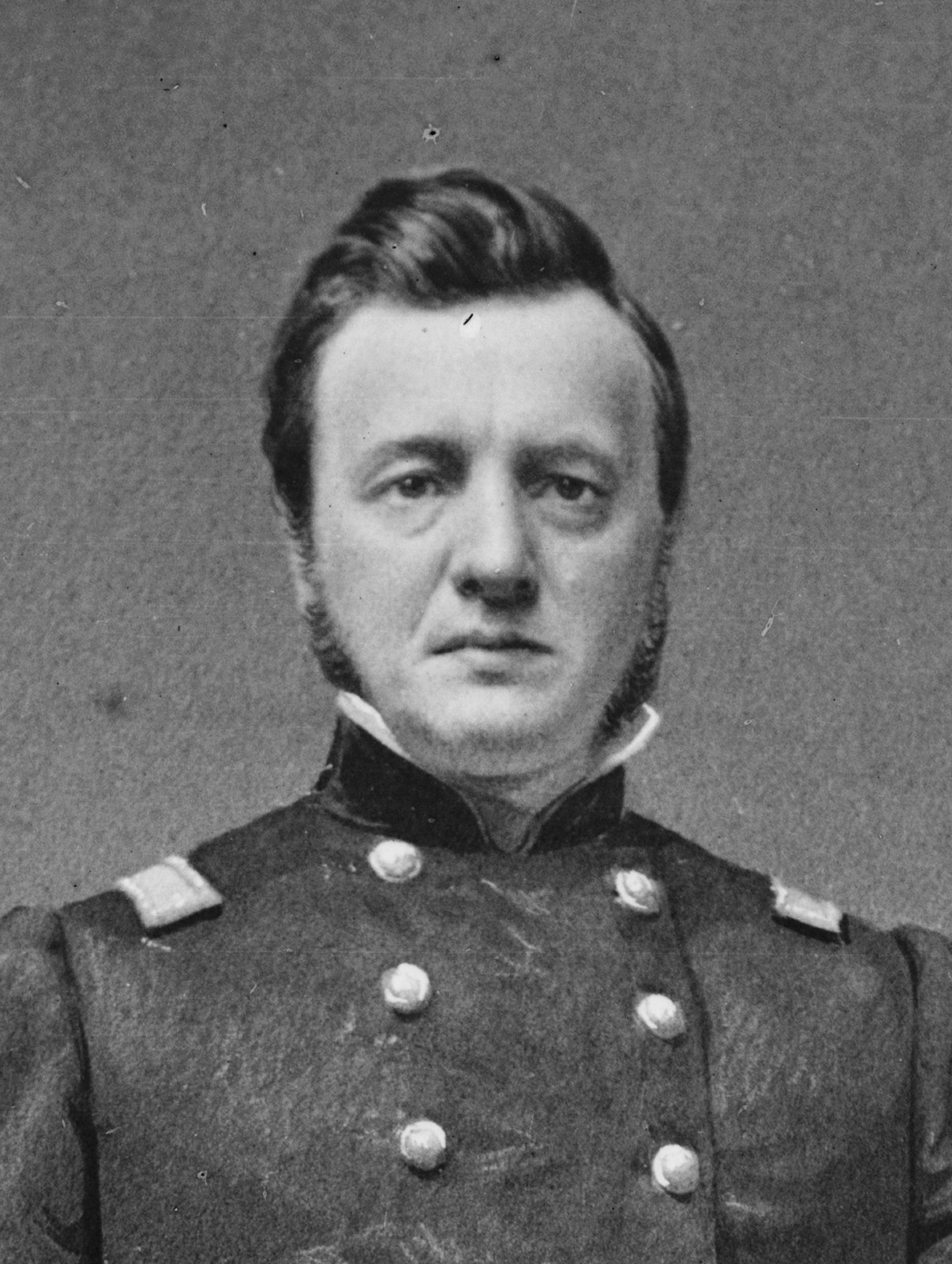

Mayor of Des Moines
- In office 1880–1882
- Preceded by: George Sneer
- Succeeded by: Peter V. Carey

Personal details
- Born: September 12, 1820 New York City, U.S.
- Died: July 23, 1891 (aged 70) Ceder Rapids, Iowa, U.S.
- Party: Democratic
- Spouse: Marcia Maria Sutherland

William Hilton Merritt (September 12, 1820 – July 23, 1891) was an American politician and newspaper editor, who served as mayor of Des Moines, Iowa, from 1880 to 1882.

== Early life ==
Merritt was born on September 12, 1820, in New York City, to Jesse and Harriet (née Hilton) Merritt, His father was a physician and merchant. He was educated at the Genesee Wesleyan Seminary in Lima, New York.

== Career ==
In 1838, he came to Rock Island, Illinois where he clerked a few months for Naylor and Myers, who sent him to Ivanhoe, Iowa in 1839 to manage a branch store. In 1840, he closed the store and moved to Burlington to accept his appointment as enrolling clerk in the Iowa Territorial Council, after the Council's adjournment he returned to Linn County, Iowa and in 1842 moved to Buffalo, New York, where he engaged in the mercantile business. He was married to Marcia Maria Sutherland on January 6, 1846.

In 1847, he returned to Iowa locating at Dubuque where he become editor of the Miners' Express until he withdrew from the paper in May 1848, and went on a government survey in the northern part of the state. In January 1849, the news of gold discoveries in California attracted his attention and he then made the journey there via the Isthmus of Panama. He returned to Iowa in March 1851 and joined W. A. Jones in the purchase of the Miners' Express and become editor of the paper again. In August 1854, he was appointed surveyor of the port of Dubuque. In 1855, he was appointed register of the United States Land Office at Fort Dodge, he served for two years selling about two million acres of land, in 1857 he resigned to enter into the banking business in Ceder Rapids with George and William Greene.

== American Civil War ==
In 1861, at the outbreak of the American Civil War, Merritt withdrew from his business interests to enter the service, at the first call of president Abraham Lincoln for three months troops. He was first elected Captain of Company K, First Iowa Infantry, which honor he declined, after which he was elected Lieutenant Colonel of the regiment and so commissioned. Owing to the illness of Colonel Bates, Merritt led that gallant regiment at the Battle of Wilson's Creek, Missouri. When General Lyon fell, mortally wounded, on that occasion. he stood within a few steps of that officer. At the expiration of four months, when the regiment was mustered out, Merritt was appointed on the staff of General McClellan with the rank of Colonel of Cavalry. He was strongly presented for promotion to Brigadier General, and was to have gone to Texas on an expedition with General Kilpatrick, but different orders were issued and he was stationed in Fort Leavenworth, Kansas, where he remained until late in 1862, when he resigned and returned to Iowa. He subsequently raised a company at Cedar Rapids for the Sixth Cavalry, under the promise of a commission as Lieutenant Colonel, failing of which he resigned and again engaged in the newspaper business.

== Later career and death ==
In July 1861, he was nominated by the Democratic State Convention for Governor of Iowa but was defeated by Samuel J. Kirkwood. In 1863 he moved to Des Moines and took editorial charge of The Statesman, a leading Democratic newspaper that he published until 1866 when he sold it. In 1866, he was appointed by president Andrew Johnson Collector of Internal Revenue but his nomination was rejected by the Senate. In 1880, he was elected mayor of Des Moines, in 1886 he was appointed postmaster of Des Moines. Merritt died in Ceder Rapids on July 23, 1891, aged 70.
