= 2019 Des Moines mayoral election =

- November 5, 2019 (first round); December 3, 2019 (runoff)
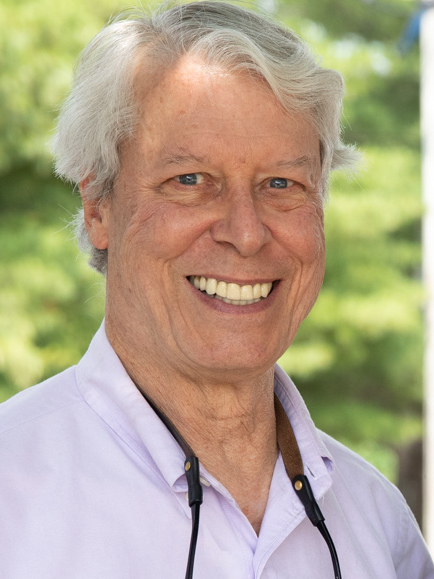

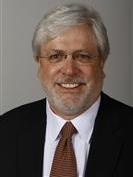
Candidate	Frank Cownie	Jack Hatch
Party	Democratic	Democratic
First round	10,751; 43.40%	10,569; 42.67%
Runoff	10,312; 50.58%	10,023; 49.16%
Candidate	Chase E. Holm	Joe Grandanette
Party	Republican	Republican
First round	2,054; 8.29%	1,336; 5.39%
Mayor before election
Frank Cownie
Democratic
Elected mayor
Frank Cownie
Democratic

The 2019 Des Moines mayoral election had an initial round held on November 5, 2019, with a runoff scheduled for December 3 to elect the mayor of Des Moines, Iowa. It saw the reelection of incumbent mayor Frank Cownie.

Cownie's margin of victory in the runoff was narrower than the margin of victory in any of his previous mayoral elections.

== Background ==
Incumbent Mayor Frank Cownie announced his intent to seek re-election on September 11, 2019. At that time, Cownie would face Republican challengers Chase Holm and Joe Grandanette in the November election. With his announcement, Cownie was seeking an unprecedented fifth term as Mayor of Des Moines.

After speculation, Jack Hatch, a former Iowa State Representative and State Senator representing the Des Moines area, formally announced his candidacy for Mayor on September 19th, 2019. In his announcement, Hatch emphasized his commitment to addressing infrastructure issues across the city.

Both Cownie and Hatch engaged in an active and intense campaign, with both candidates launching attack ads against the other. Cownie maintained a fundraising advantage against Hatch, though Hatch was able to contribute $75,000 in personal funds to his campaign.

== Candidates ==
- Frank Cownie, incumbent mayor of Des Moines since 2004 (Party affiliation: Democratic)
- Jack Hatch, Iowa state senator (Party affiliation: Democratic)
- Chase E. Holm, U.S Army veteran (Party affiliation: Republican)
- Joe Grandanette, Independent candidate for Iowa's 3rd Congressional District in 2016 and 2018, Republican candidate for Iowa's 3rd Congressional District in 2014 and 2016 (Party affiliation: Republican)

== Endorsements ==
Frank Cownie (incumbent, Democrat)

State Officials

- Janet Petersen, Iowa State Senator
- Tony Bisignano, Iowa State Senator
- Ako Abdul-Samad, Iowa State Representative
- Jo Oldson, Iowa State Representative
- Ruth Ann Gaines, Iowa State Representative

County Officials

- Kevin Schneider, Polk County Sheriff
- Angela Connolly, Polk County Supervisor
- Matt McCoy, Polk County Supervisor
- Tom Hockensmith, Polk County Supervisor

Local Officials

- Bill Gray, Des Moines City Council Member
- Chris Coleman, Des Moines City Council Member
- Connie Boesen, Des Moines City Council Member
- Joe Gatto, Des Moines City Council Member
- Josh Mandelbaum, Des Moines City Council Member
- Linda Westergaard, Des Moines City Council Member

Labor Unions

- AFSCME Council 61
- LiUNA! Local 177
- IBEW Local Union 347
- Des Moines Firefighters, local 4
- Central Iowa Building & Construction Trades Council
- Des Moines Police Bargaining Unit Association Local 10

Others

- Chase Holm, candidate for Des Moines Mayor

== Results ==
=== First round ===
First round results
Party	Candidate	Votes	%
Democratic	Frank Cownie (incumbent)	10,751	43.40
Democratic	Jack Hatch	10,569	42.67
Republican	Chase E. Holm	2,054	8.29
Republican	Joe Grandanette	1,336	5.39
Write-in		60	0.24
Total votes		24,770	

=== Runoff ===
Runoff result
Party	Candidate	Votes	%
Democratic	Frank Cownie (incumbent)	10,312	50.58
Democratic	Jack Hatch	10,023	49.16
Write-in		54	0.26
Total votes		20,389	
Democratic hold			
