= Frank Cownie =

American politician

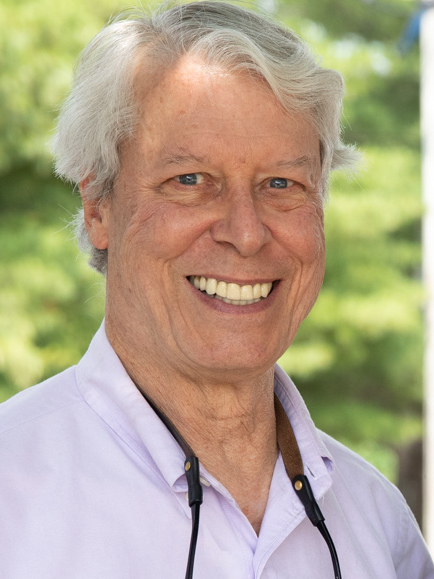

Mayor of Des Moines
- In office January 5, 2004 – January 2, 2024
- Preceded by: Preston Daniels
- Succeeded by: Connie Boesen

Personal details
- Born: March 13, 1948 (age 78) Des Moines, Iowa, U.S.
- Party: Democratic
- Education: Iowa State University

Thomas Michael Franklin "Frank" Cownie (born March 13, 1948) is an American politician who served as mayor of Des Moines, Iowa from 2004 to 2024. He also owns and operates Cownie Furs, a store that has been in his family for generations.

== Early life and career ==
Thomas "Frank" Cownie was born on March 13, 1948, in Des Moines, Iowa. He grew up on the city's west side, attending Theodore Roosevelt High School and Iowa State University. He came from a political family; both of his parents served on the city's school board.

Cownie served several terms on the Planning and Zoning Commission and was chairman of Downtown Des Moines, Inc.

In November 2001, he was elected as an at-large member of the Des Moines City Council. He served for two years.

=== 2003 mayoral campaign ===
While Iowa's city elections are non-partisan, Cownie is a Democrat.

His mayoral campaign was motivated in part by a $4.7 million budget shortfall that caused the city to have to cut power for 50% of the city's nonresidential streetlights, triple parking meter fines, and fire over 40 city employees.

He narrowly finished second in a six-way primary in 2003, and later defeated Councilwoman Christine Hensley by a nine-point margin. He succeeded fellow Democrat Preston Daniels, who was the first African American mayor of Des Moines.

== Mayoralty ==
While Iowa's city elections are non-partisan, Cownie is a Democrat. In 2015 he was re-elected for a fourth term with 80 percent of the vote, 61 points ahead of Anthony Taylor. Cownie narrowly won re-election in 2019 in a runoff against challenger Jack Hatch. Having been elected to five terms, Cownie is the longest-serving mayor in Des Moines history. On September 21, 2023, Cownie announced he would not be seeking a sixth term, effectively ending his 20-year tenure as mayor. He was succeeded by Connie Boesen in January 2024, the first female to hold the office.

== See also ==
- 2003 Des Moines mayoral election
- 2007 Des Moines mayoral election
- 2011 Des Moines mayoral election
- 2015 Des Moines mayoral election
- 2019 Des Moines mayoral election
- List of mayors of Des Moines, Iowa
- Timeline of Des Moines, Iowa#21st century

Political offices
Preceded by Preston Daniels	Mayor of Des Moines; 2004–2024	Succeeded by Connie Boesen
