= Des Moines City Council =

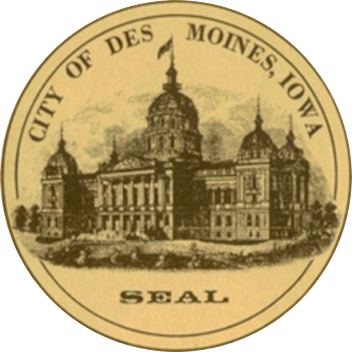

Type
- Type: Unicameral

Leadership
- Mayor: Connie Boesen
- Seats: 7

Elections
- Voting system: Electoral districts with four-year terms
- Last election: November 7, 2023

Meeting place
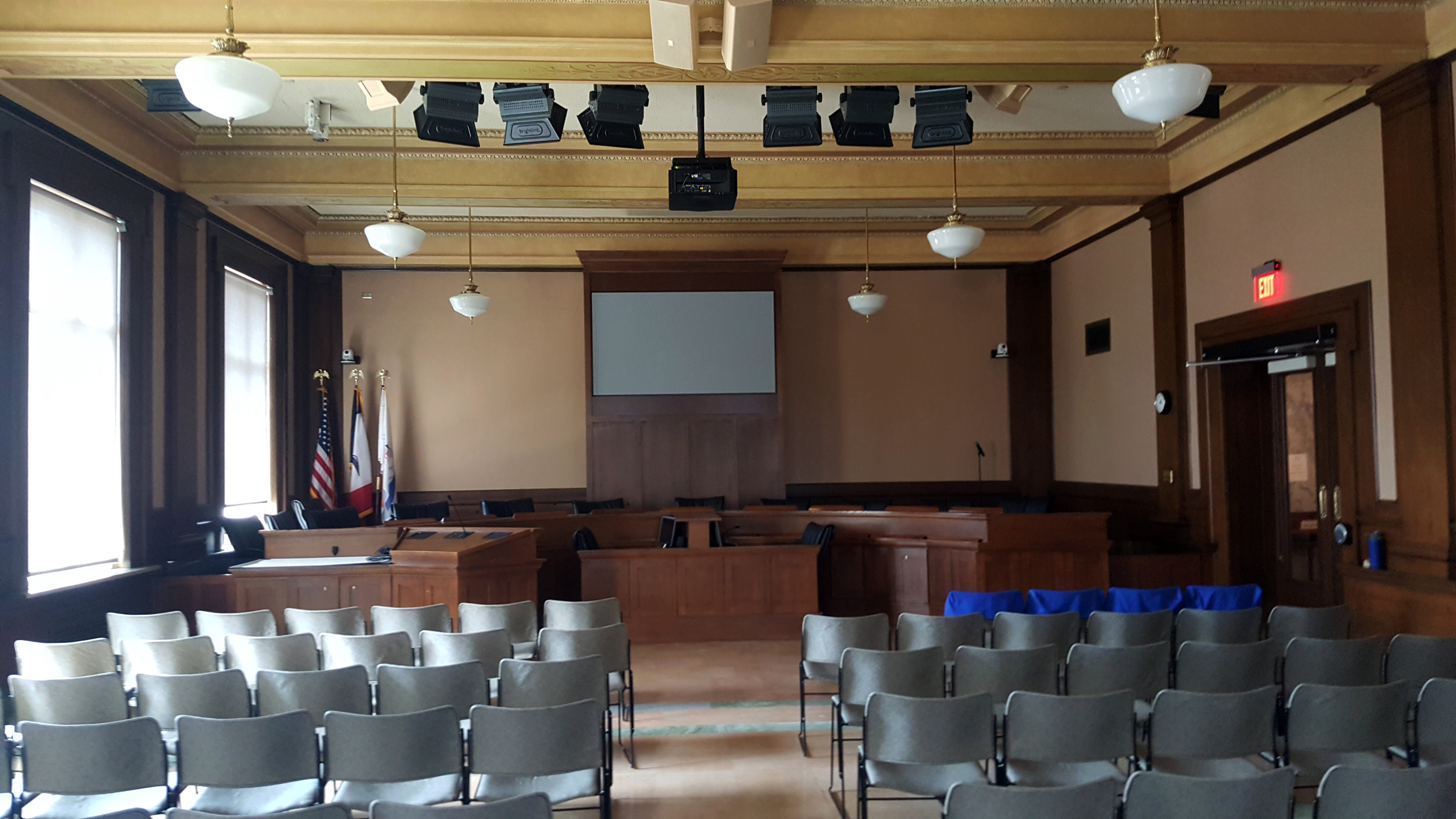
- Des Moines City Hall

Website
- https://www.dsm.city/government/

The Des Moines City Council is the legislative branch that governs the city of Des Moines, Iowa, and its more than 214,000 citizens. It has seven members, including the mayor, two of whom are elected at large and four of whom represent the city's four wards. All serve four-year terms. Des Moines has a council–manager form of government.

== History ==
=== Members of the Des Moines City Council ===
Ward	Locale	Member	Elected	Term ends
1	Northwest	Robert X. Barron	2026	2030
2	Northeast	Linda Westergaard	2015	2028
3	Southwest	Josh Mandelbaum	2017	2030
4	Southeast	Joe Gatto	2014	2028
At-large	City wide	Carl Voss	2019	2028
At-large	City wide	Mike Simonson	2024	2030
Mayor	City wide	Connie Boesen	2023	2028

== See also ==
- Des Moines City Hall
