= 1954 Iowa gubernatorial election =

- November 2, 1954
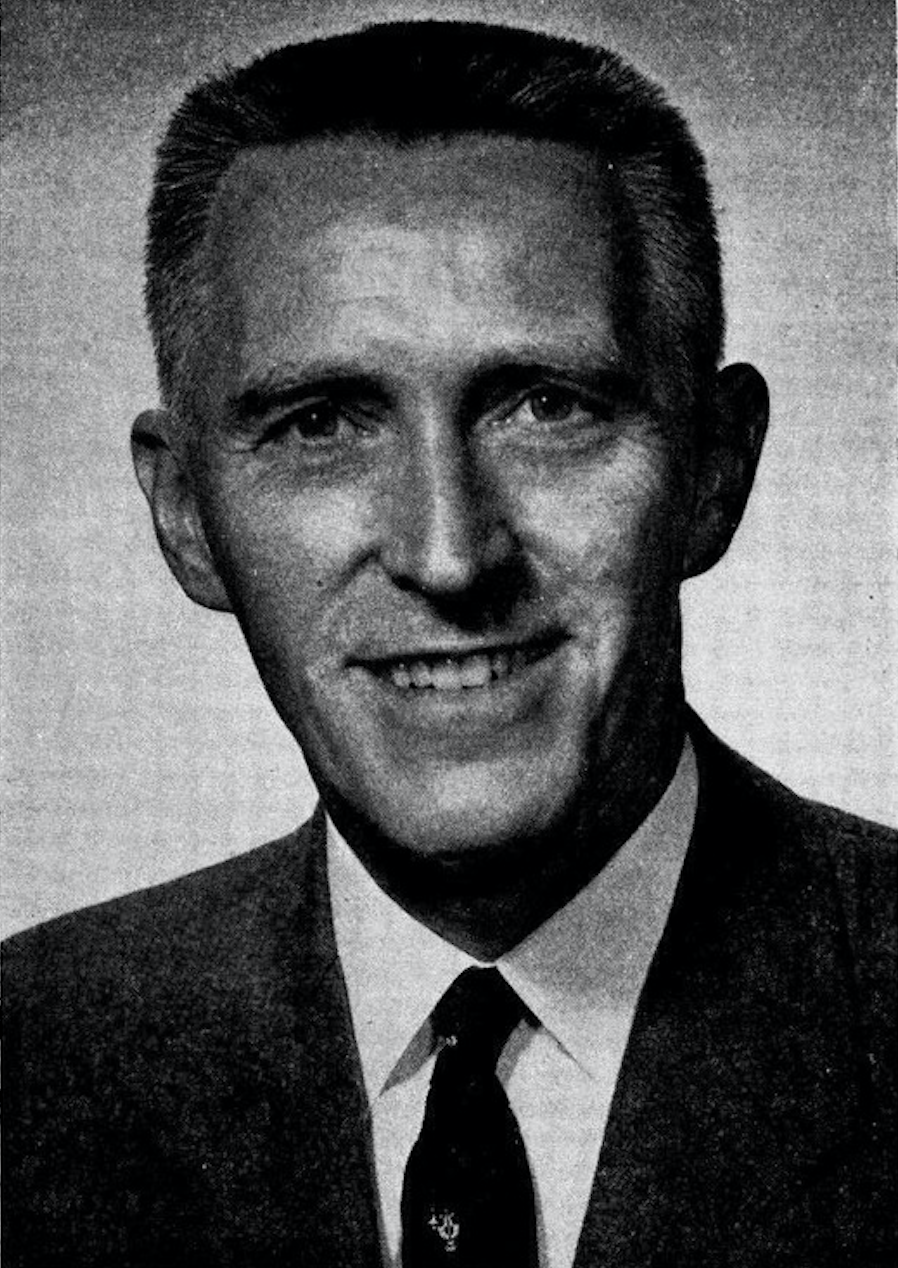

Nominee	Leo Hoegh	Clyde E. Herring
Party	Republican	Democratic
Popular vote	435,944	410,255
Percentage	51.37%	48.35%
- County results Hoegh: 50–60% 60–70% 70–80% Herring: 50–60% 60–70%
Governor before election
William S. Beardsley
Republican
Elected Governor
Leo Hoegh
Republican

The 1954 Iowa gubernatorial election took place on November 2, 1954. Republican candidate Leo Hoegh, who won the Republican primary against William H. Nicholas, defeated Democratic candidate Clyde E. Herring, receiving 51.37% of the vote. Following the election, on November 21, outgoing Governor William Beardsley died in a car accident. Lieutenant Governor Leo Elthon served as governor until Hoegh's term began.

== General election ==
=== Candidates ===
Major party candidates

- Leo Hoegh, Republican
- Clyde E. Herring, Democratic

Other candidates

- Howard H. Tyler, Independent

=== Results ===
1954 Iowa gubernatorial election
Party	Candidate	Votes	%	±%
Republican	Leo Hoegh	435,944	51.37%	
Democratic	Clyde E. Herring	410,255	48.35%	
Independent	Howard H. Tyler	2,393	0.28%	
Majority		25,689		
Turnout		848,592		
Republican hold		Swing		
