= Robert L. Larson =

American judge (1898–1986)

Robert Larson

Chief Justice of the Iowa Supreme Court
- In office July 1, 1959 – December 31, 1961
- Preceded by: G. King Thompson
- Succeeded by: Theodore G. Garfield
- In office January 1, 1956 – June 30, 1956
- Preceded by: Ralph Oliver
- Succeeded by: G. King Thompson

Associate Justice of the Iowa Supreme Court
- In office February 9, 1953 – April 1, 1971
- Appointed by: William S. Beardsley
- Preceded by: Halleck J. Mantz

23rd Attorney General of Iowa
- In office 1947–1953
- Governor: Robert D. Blue; William S. Beardsley
- Preceded by: John M. Rankin
- Succeeded by: Leo Hoegh

Assistant Attorney General of Iowa
- In office 1943–1947

Solicitor for Iowa City
- In office 1937–1941

Personal details
- Born: September 20, 1898 Fairfield, Iowa, U.S.
- Died: October 6, 1986 (aged 88)
- Spouse(s): Helen Kruse (m. 1922) Wilma Donham (m. 1938)
- Children: 4

Military service
- Branch/service: United States Navy
- Rank: Apprentice Seaman

Robert Leonard Larson (September 20, 1898 – October 6, 1986) was a justice of the Iowa Supreme Court from February 9, 1953, to April 1, 1971, appointed from Johnson County, Iowa. He was previously Attorney General of Iowa from 1947 to 1953.

== Personal life ==
Larson was born in Fairfield, Iowa to Charles Leonard Larson and Nellie (Stever) Larson. He graduated from Parsons College in 1921. He served in the U.S. Navy during World War I. He later attended the University of Chicago before receiving his J.D. degree from the University of Iowa in 1930. While at Iowa he was initiated into Sigma Pi fraternity.

After graduating he practiced law in Iowa City until 1943 while also teaching at public schools in Wapello and Anamosa. From 1937 to 1941 he was the Solicitor of Iowa City and on the Johnson County Republican Central Committee.

Larson was a member of the American Legion, Freemasons, Shriners, the American Bar Association, and the Rotary.

He married Helen Kruse on June 1, 1922 and later to Wilma Donham on March 12, 1938. He had four children.

== Government ==
Larson began serving as the assistant attorney general of Iowa in 1943. He was appointed as the state's attorney general in 1947 to fill the unexpired term of John M. Rankin. He was elected to the office in 1948 and served until 1953.

In 1952 he turned down an opportunity to run for governor.

In 1953, he was appointed to the Iowa Supreme Court by Governor William S. Beardsley. He served a six-month term as the Chief Justice in 1955. He became the first permanent Chief Justice from 1959 to 1961.

== Notable cases ==
Katko v. Briney while an associate justice of the Iowa Supreme Court.

Party political offices
Preceded by John M. Rankin	Republican nominee for Attorney General of Iowa; 1946, 1948, 1950, 1952	Succeeded by Dayton Countryman
Legal offices
Preceded by John M. Rankin	Attorney General of Iowa; 1947–1953	Succeeded by Leo Hoegh
