= Henry Burma =

American politician (1894–1974)

Speaker of the Iowa House of Representatives
- In office January 11, 1943 – January 7, 1945
- Preceded by: Robert D. Blue
- Succeeded by: Harold Felton

Member of the Iowa House of Representatives from the 73rd district
- In office January 11, 1937 – January 7, 1945

Personal details
- Born: Henry W. Burma; November 7, 1894 Washington Township, Butler County, Iowa, U.S.
- Died: December 8, 1974 (aged 80) Allison, Iowa, U.S.
- Party: Republican
- Spouse: Katheryn McGinn (m. 1924)
- Children: 2
- Education: University of Dubuque
- Occupation: Politician

Military service
- Allegiance: United States
- Branch/service: United States Army
- Unit: 351st Infantry Regiment
- Battles/wars: World War I

Henry W. Burma (November 7, 1894 – December 8, 1974) was an American politician.

Henry Burma was born in Washington Township, Butler County, Iowa, to parents Harm F. and Anna Nuttbrook Burma on November 7, 1894. Burma was educated in the rural schools of Bristow, attended high school in Allison, and after serving in World War I with the 351st Infantry Regiment, graduated from the University of Dubuque.

Throughout his political career, Burma was affiliated with the Republican Party. Between 1923 and 1937, Burma served as sheriff of Butler County. He was then elected to four consecutive terms on the Iowa House of Representatives for District 73. In his final term as a state legislator, Burma's colleagues elected him house speaker. Burma contested the Republican primary for the 1944 Iowa gubernatorial election, losing to Robert D. Blue. Subsequently, Burma was named to the Iowa Board of Control from 1944 to 1954, then worked as a juvenile probation officer for the counties of Hancock, Mitchell, Winnebago, and Worth from 1954 until 1967.

Burma married Katheryn McGinn in Nashua on June 30, 1924. The couple raised a son and daughter, Charles Henry and Marjorie. McGinn died in 1957, Charles in 1973, and Marjorie in 1974. Burma died of leukemia at home in Allison on December 8, 1974. A collection of Burma's papers are held by the University of Iowa Libraries.
