= Charles F. Wennerstrum =

American lawyer and judge (1889–1986)

Chief Justice of the Iowa Supreme Court
- In office January 1, 1955 – June 30, 1955
- Preceded by: Theodore G. Garfield
- Succeeded by: Ralph A. Oliver
- In office January 1, 1951 – June 31, 1951
- Preceded by: Theodore G. Garfield
- Succeeded by: Ralph A. Oliver
- In office January 1, 1947 – June 30, 1947
- Preceded by: Theodore G. Garfield
- Succeeded by: Ralph A. Oliver
- In office July 1, 1942 – December 31, 1942
- Preceded by: William L. Bliss
- Succeeded by: Theodore G. Garfield
- In office January 1, 1939 – June 31, 1939
- Succeeded by: William L. Bliss

Associate Justice of the Iowa Supreme Court
- In office January 1, 1941 – December 31, 1958
- Preceded by: Wilson H. Hamilton

Personal details
- Born: October 11, 1889 Cambridge, Illinois, U.S.
- Died: June 1, 1986 (aged 96)
- Cause of death: Heart attack
- Education: Drake University
- Profession: Lawyer, judge
- Known for: Presiding over and criticizing the Nuremberg trials

Military service
- Allegiance: United States
- Branch/service: United States Army
- Rank: Lieutenant
- Battles/wars: World War I

Charles F. Wennerstrum (October 11, 1889 – June 1, 1986) was an American lawyer who presided over and sharply criticized some of the Nuremberg war crimes trials after World War II.

== Life ==
Wennerstrum was born in Cambridge, Illinois and studied at Drake University, where he graduated in law in 1914. Elected county attorney of Lucas County in 1916, he served as a lieutenant of the U.S. Army in World War I. From January 1, 1941, until December 31, 1958, he served on the Iowa Supreme Court, where he was chief justice for two years. During that time, he also served as the presiding judge in the Hostages Case at the Subsequent Nuremberg Trials in Nuremberg, Germany in 1947/48, where some German generals were tried for war crimes.

He assailed what he saw as the nationalistic and biased approaches of some prosecutors to the trials, suggesting that some of them were more interested in furthering their own careers than in seeing justice done.

'The trials were to have convinced the Germans of the guilt of their leaders,' he said in 1948. 'They convinced the Germans merely that they lost the war to tough conquerors.'

After retiring from the Supreme Court of Iowa, he opened a private law practice in Des Moines.

Political offices
Preceded by Wilson H. Hamilton	Justice of the Iowa Supreme Court; 1941–1958	Succeeded by
