= 1944 Iowa gubernatorial election =

- November 7, 1944
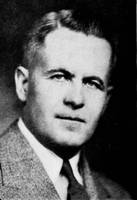

Nominee	Robert D. Blue	Richard F. Mitchell
Party	Republican	Democratic
Popular vote	561,827	437,684
Percentage	56.01%	43.63%
- County results Blue: 50–60% 60–70% 70–80% Mitchell: 50–60%
Governor before election
Bourke B. Hickenlooper
Republican
Elected Governor
Robert D. Blue
Republican

The 1944 Iowa gubernatorial election was held on November 7, 1944. Republican nominee Robert D. Blue defeated Democratic nominee Richard F. Mitchell with 56.01% of the vote.

== Primary elections ==
Primary elections were held on June 5, 1944.

=== Democratic primary ===
==== Candidates ====
- Richard F. Mitchell, former Associate Justice of the Iowa Supreme Court

==== Results ====
Democratic primary results
Party	Candidate	Votes	%
Democratic	Richard F. Mitchell	38,086	100.00
Total votes		38,086	100.00

=== Republican primary ===
==== Candidates ====
- Robert D. Blue, incumbent Lieutenant Governor
- Henry W. Burma, Speaker of the Iowa House of Representatives
- Milton W. Strickler, former State Representative

==== Results ====
Republican primary results
Party	Candidate	Votes	%
Republican	Robert D. Blue	102,246	
Republican	Henry W. Burma	63,011	
Republican	Milton W. Strickler	9,859	
Total votes			

== General election ==
=== Candidates ===
Major party candidates

- Robert D. Blue, Republican
- Richard F. Mitchell, Democratic

Other candidates

- Glen Williamson, Prohibition
- Hugo Bockewitz, Socialist

=== Results ===
1944 Iowa gubernatorial election
Party	Candidate	Votes	%	±%
Republican	Robert D. Blue	561,827	56.01%	
Democratic	Richard F. Mitchell	437,684	43.63%	
Prohibition	Glen Williamson	2,815	0.28%	
Socialist	Hugo Bockewitz	832	0.08%	
Majority		124,143		
Turnout				
Republican hold		Swing		
