= Ralph A. Oliver =

American judge (1886–1968)

Ralph Oliver

Chief Justice of the Iowa Supreme Court
- In office July 1, 1955 – December 31, 1955
- Preceded by: Charles F. Wennerstrum
- Succeeded by: Robert L. Larson
- In office July 1, 1951 – December 31, 1951
- Preceded by: Charles F. Wennerstrum
- Succeeded by: G. King Thompson
- In office July 1, 1947 – December 31, 1947
- Preceded by: Charles F. Wennerstrum
- Succeeded by: John E. Mulroney
- In office July 1, 1939 – December 31, 1939
- Preceded by: Charles F. Wennerstrum
- Succeeded by: Wilson H. Hamilton

Associate Justice of the Iowa Supreme Court
- In office December 14, 1938 – October 1, 1962
- Appointed by: Nelson Kraschel
- Preceded by: James M. Parsons
- Succeeded by: William Corwin Stuart

Personal details
- Born: July 31, 1886; Eddyville, Iowa, U.S.
- Died: October 13, 1968 (aged 82); Sioux City, Iowa, U.S.
- Relatives: S. Addison Oliver (grandfather)

Ralph A. Oliver (July 31, 1886 – October 13, 1968) was a justice of the Iowa Supreme Court from December 14, 1938, to October 1, 1962, appointed from Woodbury County, Iowa by Governor Kraschel following the death of Justice Parsons.

== Judicial career ==
Oliver was elected as a Republican, defeating appointed incumbent Ernest M. Miller.

== Personal Life and Family History ==
He was the son of Judge John F. Oliver, Iowa District Court Judge from 1898 to 1914. He was the grandson of US Congressman S. Addison Oliver who served as County Supervisor, State Representative in the Iowa House, Senator in the Iowa Senate and Iowa District Court Judge from 1868 to 1871. Addison also served as a delegate for Republican's re-nomination of Abraham Lincoln at the Baltimore Convention.

Political offices
Preceded by James M. Parsons	Justice of the Iowa Supreme Court; 1938–1962	Succeeded by William Corwin Stuart
