= Richard F. Mitchell =

American judge (1889–1969)

Richard Mitchell

Chief Justice of the Iowa Supreme Court
- In office 1934–1934
- Preceded by: Elma G. Albert

Associate Justice of the Iowa Supreme Court
- In office December 6, 1932 – December 31, 1942
- Preceded by: William L. Bliss
- Succeeded by: John E. Mulroney

Personal details
- Born: October 11, 1889 Fort Dodge, Iowa U.S.
- Died: August 2, 1969 (aged 79) Chevy Chase, Maryland, U.S.
- Spouse: Mirian Reynolds
- Relations: Jim Gaffigan (Grandson)
- Children: 2

Richard Furlong Mitchell (October 11, 1889 – August 2, 1969) was the chief justice of the Iowa Supreme Court in 1934.

== Early life and Legal career ==
Born in Fort Dodge, Iowa, he was the son of Sarah A. (née Furlong) and Peter M. Mitchell. He was one of six children. He graduated from Iowa state law school in 1913. He spent much of the next 19 years of his career in private practice at Fort Dodge. From 1924 to 1931, he was a Democratic State Central Committee member. In 1929, he was a Democratic National committeeman. He married Mirian Reynolds. They had two daughters.

== Iowa Supreme Court ==
He was elected from Webster County on December 6, 1932, after Justice William L. Bliss resigned from the court. During that time, he authored 465 opinions. He also served as chief justice for part of his time. He left the court in 1942 and was replaced by John E. Mulroney.

== Post Court ==
After he left the court, he returned to his private practice in Fort Dodge.

During World War Two, he was a labor mediator for President Franklin D. Roosevelt, and then President Harry S. Truman.

In the 1944 Iowa gubernatorial election, Mitchell was the Democratic nominee for governor of Iowa. He received 43.61 percent of the vote, and lost to republican Robert D. Blue. In 1946, Truman appointed Mitchell to the Interstate Commerce Commission, and was the chairman of it from 1954 to 1957. He retired in 1959.

Mitchell died at his home in Chevy Chase, Maryland, at the age of 79. His funeral was in Washington, D.C., and he is buried in Gate of Heaven Cemetery, in Maryland. His grandson is comedian and actor Jim Gaffigan.

Party political offices
Preceded by Nelson G. Kraschel	Democratic nominee for Governor of Iowa; 1944	Succeeded by Frank Miles
Political offices
Preceded by William L. Bliss	Justice of the Iowa Supreme Court; 1932–1942	Succeeded by John E. Mulroney
