= Maurice E. Rawlings =

Iowa Supreme Court justice (1906–1982)

Maurice Rawlings

Justice of the Iowa Supreme Court
- In office July 19, 1965 – August 17, 1978

Personal details
- Born: August 17, 1908
- Died: September 10, 1982 (aged 74)

Maurice Edward Rawlings (August 17, 1906 – September 10, 1982) was a justice of the Iowa Supreme Court from July 19, 1965, to August 17, 1978, appointed from Woodbury County, Iowa.

Political offices
| Preceded by Henry F. Peterson | Justice of the Iowa Supreme Court; 1965–1978 | Succeeded by |
