= Dayton Countryman =

American lawyer and politician

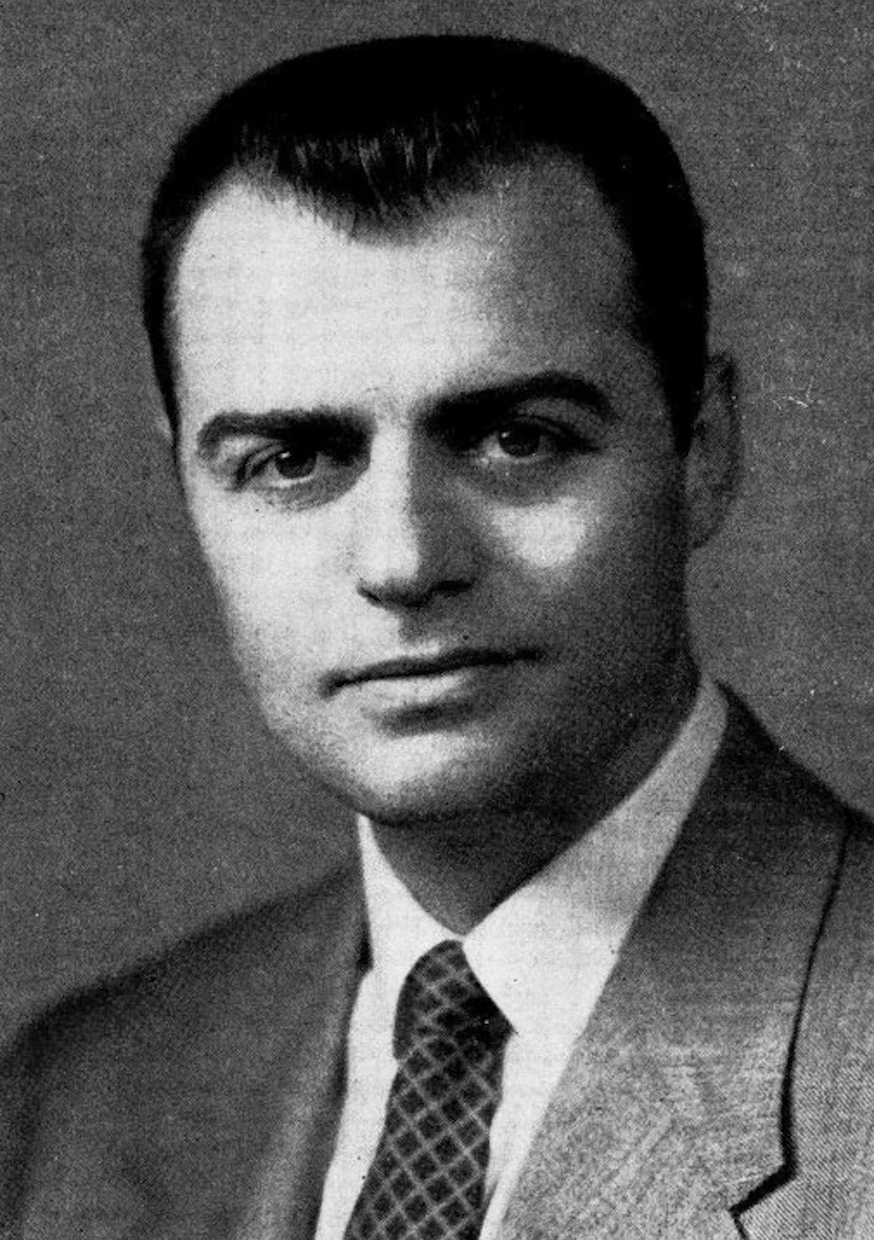

25th Attorney General of Iowa
- In office 1955–1957
- Governor: Leo Hoegh
- Preceded by: Leo Hoegh
- Succeeded by: Norman A. Erbe

Story County Attorney
- In office 1954–1950

Personal details
- Born: Dayton Wendell Countryman; March 31, 1918 Sioux City, Iowa, U.S.
- Died: September 13, 2011 (aged 93) Ames, Iowa, U.S.
- Party: Republican
- Education: Iowa State University (BS); University of Iowa (LLB)

Military service
- Branch/service: United States Army
- Battles/wars: World War II

Dayton Wendell Countryman (March 31, 1918 – September 13, 2011) was an American attorney, farmer, and politician who served as the 26th Attorney General of Iowa from 1955 to 1957.

== Early life and education ==
Born in Sioux City, Iowa, Countryman attended Pierson High School. He then received his bachelor's degree in forestry from Iowa State University in 1940. During World War II, Countryman served in the United States Army Air Forces as a pilot and was commissioned lieutenant colonel. He then graduated from the University of Iowa College of Law in 1948 and was admitted to the Iowa bar.

== Career ==
Countryman practiced law in Nevada, Iowa. From 1950 to 1954, Countryman served as attorney for Story County, Iowa as a member of the Republican party. From 1955 to 1957, Countryman served as Attorney General of Iowa. In 1956, 1960, and 1968, Countryman unsuccessfully sought the Republican nomination for United States Senate. He continued to practice law in Nevada, Iowa and also managed his farms.

== Death ==
Countryman died in Ames, Iowa, from complications of Alzheimer's disease.

Party political offices
Preceded by Robert L. Larson	Republican nominee for Attorney General of Iowa; 1954	Succeeded by Norman A. Erbe
