= James McGowan Morgan =

American politician (1813–1862)

James McGowan Morgan (1813–1862) was an American politician.

Morgan was born in 1813, and moved from his native Ohio to Burlington, Iowa, in 1837. On November 17, 1842, Morgan married Ann Maria Mauro.

Morgan took office in the Iowa Legislative Assembly on December 6, 1841, representing the third district of the Territorial House of Representatives, and served until December 3, 1843. He returned to the third district seat on May 5, 1845, serving continuously until November 29, 1846. He was speaker of the territorial house in the Fifth Legislative Assembly, as well as during his partial term in the Seventh Legislative Assembly. Throughout his political career, Morgan was a member of the Democratic Party.

Morgan died on October 6, 1862, in Burlington.
