= 1950 Iowa gubernatorial election =

- November 7, 1950
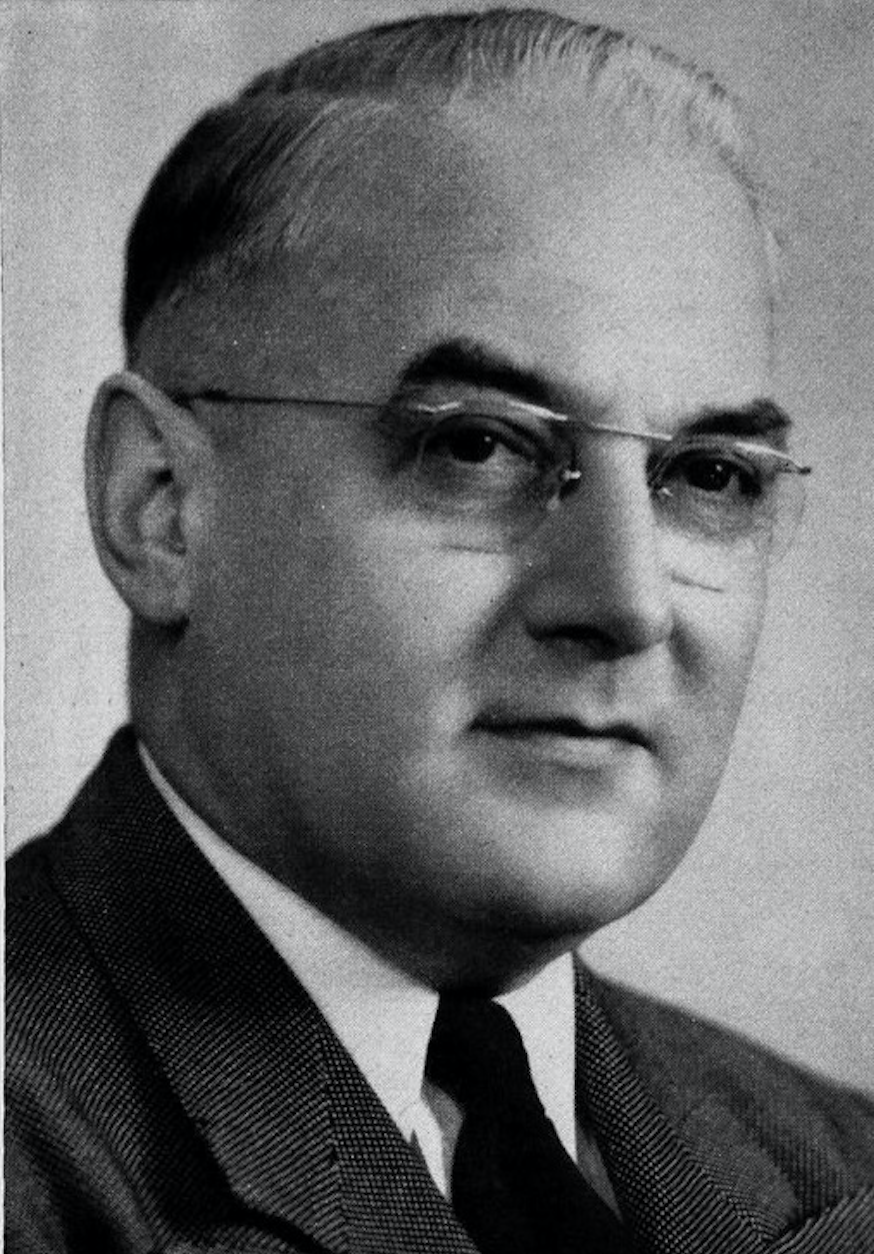

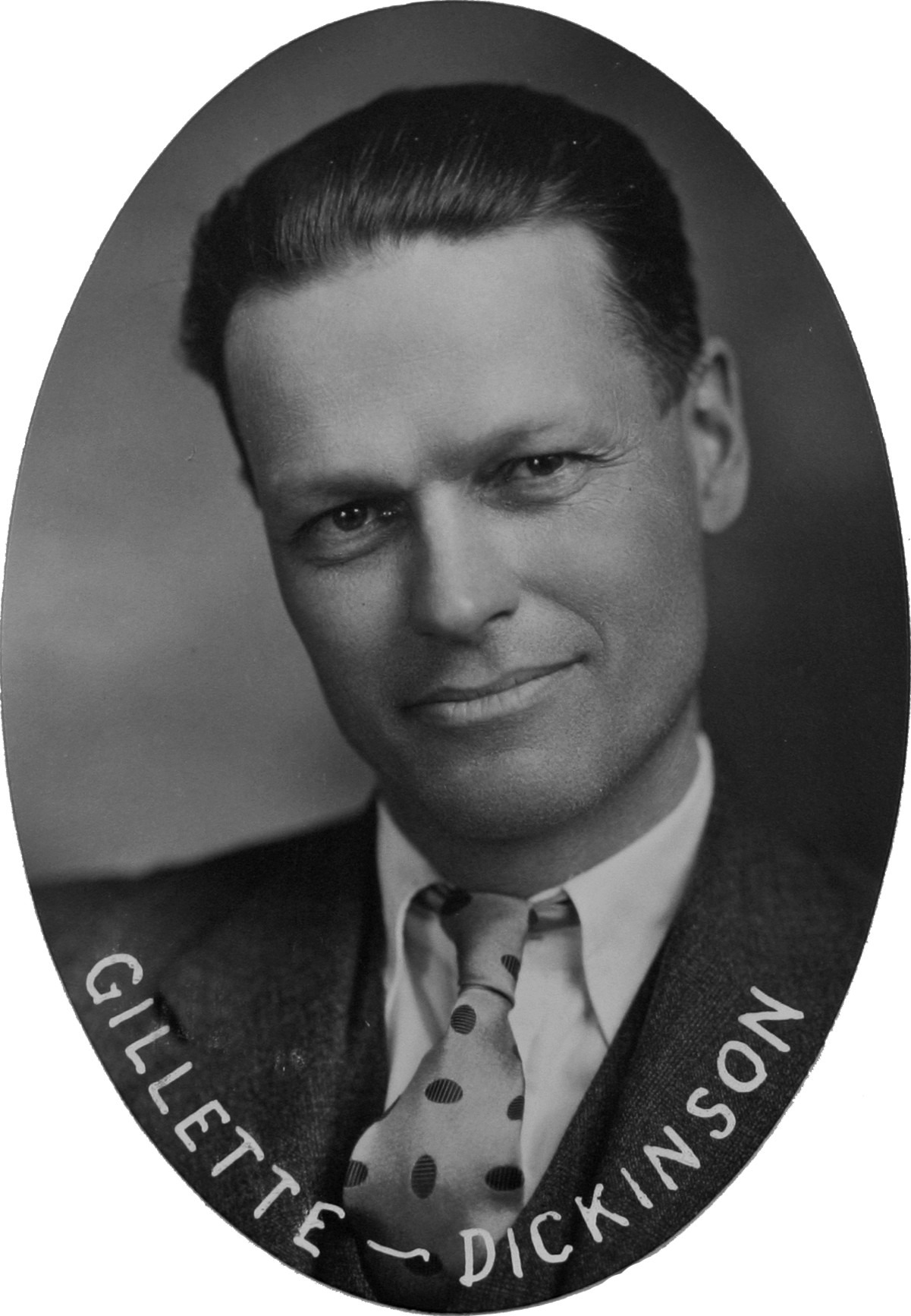
Nominee	William S. Beardsley	Lester S. Gillette
Party	Republican	Democratic
Popular vote	506,642	347,176
Percentage	59.10%	40.50%
- County results Beardsley: 50–60% 60–70% 70–80% Gillette: 50–60%
Governor before election
William S. Beardsley
Republican
Elected Governor
William S. Beardsley
Republican

The 1950 Iowa gubernatorial election was held on November 7, 1950. Incumbent Republican William S. Beardsley defeated Democratic nominee Lester S. Gillette with 59.10% of the vote.

== Primary elections ==
Primary elections were held on June 5, 1950.

=== Democratic primary ===
==== Candidates ====
- Lester S. Gillette, former State Senator
- Myron J. Bennett

==== Results ====
Democratic primary results
Party	Candidate	Votes	%
Democratic	Lester S. Gillette	70,046	
Democratic	Myron J. Bennett	23,458	
Total votes		93,504	

=== Republican primary ===
==== Candidates ====
- William S. Beardsley, incumbent Governor

==== Results ====
Republican primary results
Party	Candidate	Votes	%
Republican	William S. Beardsley (incumbent)	238,686	100.00
Total votes		238,686	100.00

== General election ==
=== Candidates ===
Major party candidates

- William S. Beardsley, Republican
- Lester S. Gillette, Democratic

Other candidates

- W. Raymond Picken, Prohibition
- Howard H. Tyler, Independent

=== Results ===
1950 Iowa gubernatorial election
Party	Candidate	Votes	%	±%
Republican	William S. Beardsley (incumbent)	506,642	59.10%	
Democratic	Lester S. Gillette	347,176	40.50%	
Prohibition	W. Raymond Picken	2,805	0.33%	
Independent	Howard H. Tyler	590	0.07%	
Majority		159,466		
Turnout		857,213		
Republican hold		Swing		
