= Reuben Noble =

American politician and judge in Iowa (1821–1896)

Reuben Noble (April 14, 1821 – August 8, 1896) was an American politician and judge from Iowa.

== Early life ==
Noble was born on April 14, 1821, in Adams County, Mississippi, near Natchez. He worked on the family farm in Mississippi until 1833, when the Nobles moved to Jersey County, Illinois, due to his father's opposition to slavery, and started a new farm. Aged 18, Reuben Noble moved to the Quincy area to pursue education at a manual labor college run by David Nelson. He also began studying law with Edward H. Buckley. By 1842, Noble moved to Fair Play, Wisconsin, where he worked as a miner and lawyer. The following year, Noble settled in Garnavillo, Iowa. Noble married Harriett C. Douglas in 1844. He was active in the bar association of northeastern Iowa from 1850.

== Early Whig and Republican political career ==
Prior to 1850, Noble had served a single term as Clayton County district attorney, subsequently refusing to run for reelection. Noble was elected to the Iowa House of Representatives for District 2 in 1854, as a Free Soil Whig. During his single term in office, Noble additionally served as house speaker. Upon stepping down as a state representative, Noble moved his family to McGregor. After the Whig Party dissolved, Noble became a member of the succeeding Republican Party and was elected to its 1856 state convention in Iowa. He and Fitz Henry Warren were also considered as Republican electors in that year's presidential election, a position Noble refused.

== Later Democratic political activity, judgeship, and legal career ==
Throughout Andrew Johnson's presidency, Noble supported him. In 1866, the same year he became the founding president of Iowa's Pioneer Lawmakers' Association, Noble accepted the Democratic Party's nomination to contest Iowa's 3rd congressional district in the United States House of Representatives election in Iowa. Noble lost the election to Republican incumbent William B. Allison. Four years later, Noble was a Democratic candidate for the Iowa Supreme Court seat eventually assumed by James G. Day. Noble won consecutive terms as a district court judge in 1874 and 1878, but resigned shortly soon after winning his second term to privately practice law alongside Thomas Updegraff. Noble was again defeated in his 1879 bid for the Iowa Supreme Court. The Noble–Updegraff legal partnership ended after Updegraff completed his second term in the United States House of Representatives, and thereafter, Noble worked as a lawyer for what became known as Milwaukee Road.

== Death ==
Noble died in McGregor, Iowa, on August 8, 1896.
