= Jacob Butler (politician) =

American politician (1817–1874)

Jacob Butler (August 14, 1817 – April 23, 1874) was an American politician.

Butler was born in Franklin County, Ohio, on August 14, 1817. After graduating from Miami College, Butler studied law with Joseph Rockwell Swan. Butler's move westward was funded in part by Swan. Butler successively lived in New Orleans and St. Louis before he relocated to Muscatine, Iowa, in 1841, where his former Miami College classmates John D. Deshler and Charles S. Foster had also moved. In addition to practicing law, Butler served as president of the Muscatine National Bank and the local gas company.

Butler was a Republican member of the Iowa House of Representatives from January 11, 1864, to January 7, 1866. He concurrently held the District 25 seat as well as the speakership.

Butler died on April 23, 1874.
