= Henry Stone (1853–1909) =

American politician

Henry Stone (January 23, 1853 – July 31, 1909) was an American politician.

Stone was born on a farm in Noble County, Ohio, on January 23, 1853. He attended local schools until the age of fourteen, and graduated from Oberlin College in 1875, then pursued a legal education in Cincinnati. Stone subsequently moved to Marshall County, Iowa, to teach near Marietta. In 1878, Stone moved into Marshalltown to practice law alongside R. E. Sears at the firm Sears & Stone. After eighteen months, Sears left the partnership and Stone maintained the practice as a solo endeavor.

Stone was active in Republican Party politics before he won his first election to the Iowa House of Representatives in November 1891, having served chair of the Marshall County Republican Central Committee. He contested the House District 51 seat, and took office on January 10, 1892. In the presidential election held later that year, Stone was a member of the Electoral College, representing Iowa's fifth congressional district. He won a second term for Iowa House District 51 in 1893, and was additionally selected to the speakership. Stone was considered, alongside Albert B. Cummins, John H. Gear, and three others, by the Iowa General Assembly for the Republican nomination in the 1894 United States Senate election in Iowa, won by Gear. Stone stepped down from the state house at the end of his term in 1896 to resume working at his law firm. In 1899 and 1901, Stone was elected to consecutive terms as Marshall County attorney.

Stone died in at a sanatorium in Chicago on July 31, 1909, at the age of 56.
