= Ernest M. Miller =

Iowa Supreme Court justice (1890–1941)

Ernest Miller

Justice of the Iowa Supreme Court
- In office December 27, 1937 – December 13, 1938

Personal details
- Born: November 26, 1890
- Died: June 13, 1941 (aged 50)

Ernest M. Miller (November 26, 1890 – June 13, 1941) was a justice of the Iowa Supreme Court from December 27, 1937, to December 13, 1938, appointed from Shelby County, Iowa.

Political offices
Preceded by James M. Parsons	Justice of the Iowa Supreme Court; 1937–1938	Succeeded by Ralph A. Oliver
