= G. King Thompson =

American judge (1887–1979)

King Thompson

Chief Justice of the Iowa Supreme Court
- In office January 1, 1959 – June 30, 1959
- Preceded by: Theodore G. Garfield
- Succeeded by: Robert L. Larson
- In office July 1, 1956 – December 31, 1956
- Preceded by: Robert L. Larson
- Succeeded by: William L. Bliss
- In office January 1, 1952 – June 30, 1952
- Preceded by: Ralph A. Oliver
- Succeeded by: John E. Mulroney

Associate Justice of the Iowa Supreme Court
- In office January 1, 1951 – June 30, 1965
- Preceded by: Oscar Hale
- Succeeded by: M. L. Mason

Judge of Iowa's 18th Judicial District
- In office 1941 – December 31, 1949

County Attorney of Linn County
- In office 1933–1940

Personal details
- Born: November 24, 1887 near Jamaica, Iowa
- Died: May 12, 1979 (aged 91) Cedar Rapids, Iowa
- Spouse(s): Margaret Kane (m. 1915; died 1918) Grace Byfield (m. 1921)
- Education: Iowa University (BA)(JD)

George King Thompson (November 24, 1887 – May 12, 1979) was a justice of the Iowa Supreme Court from January 1, 1951, to June 30, 1965, appointed from Linn County, Iowa.

== Early life ==
He was born on farm near Jamaica, Iowa to William Jenkins Thompson and Ida America (King) Thompson.

He graduated from Iowa University with a Liberal Arts Degree in 1911 and then from the Law Department in 1914. While at Iowa University, he was a co-owner and editor of Daily Iowan. After graduating in 1914, he joined the Iowa City Citizen, as a city editor, until January 1915.

== Legal career ==
In 1915, he joined the firm of Rickel, Dennis & Thompson, in Cedar Rapids for two years. In May 1917 he moved to firm of Barnes & Chamberlain, until 1920 when he joined the firm of Barnes, Chamberlain, Hanzlik & Thompson.

In 1923, he became an Assistant County Attorney for Linn County. He became the County Attorney in 1933 until 1940. He was elevated to be a Judge in Iowa's 18th Judicial District from 1941 until he was appointed to the state supreme court. He served on the Iowa Supreme Court from 1951 to 1965, serving as Chief Justice from 1959 to 1961.

== Personal life ==
He married Margaret Kane on September 1, 1915. She died in 1918. They had one son, George Jr. He later married Grace Byfield on December 17, 1921. They had another son, named William. Grace was the superintendent of nurses at Saint Luke's Hospital in Cedar Rapids. He was a Presbyterian and a Republican.

He died on May 12, 1979, in Cedar Rapids.

Political offices
Preceded by Oscar Hale	Justice of the Iowa Supreme Court; 1951–1965	Succeeded by M. L. Mason
