= Lore Alford =

American politician (1838–1900)

Lore Alford (March 8, 1838 – March 30, 1900) was an American politician.

== Early life and military service ==
Alford was a native of Hope, Maine, born on March 8, 1838. He attended Kent's Hill Seminary and Union College. Alford enlisted in the 16th New York Infantry Regiment soon after the American Civil War began, and saw action at the First Battle of Bull Run. Alford later served under Benjamin Butler during the Capture of New Orleans. In June 1862, Alford received his commission as a second lieutenant of Company H, 8th Maine Infantry Regiment. While attached to the 8th Maine, Alford served as judge's advocate from 1863 to 1864 at Beaufort and Hilton Head, South Carolina. In March 1864, Alford began reporting to Israel Vogdes of the X Corps, and subsequently joined the Army of the James. Alford ended his Union Army service in October 1864, and moved to Waterloo, Iowa, in 1886.

== Legal and political career in Iowa ==
In Waterloo, Alford started his own practice of law, then partnered with J. C. Elwell until Elwell's retirement in 1879. From January 1881 until his death, Alford practiced law alongside J C. Gates. Alford won his first election to the Iowa House of Representatives in 1877 as a Republican for District 54. He was reelected in 1879, and additionally served as Speaker of the House during his second term.

== Personal life ==
Alford married Miss Lilla St. John on March 29, 1871, in Chicago. The couple raised six children. He died in Waterloo on March 30, 1900.
