= Leo Hoegh =

American politician (1908–2000)

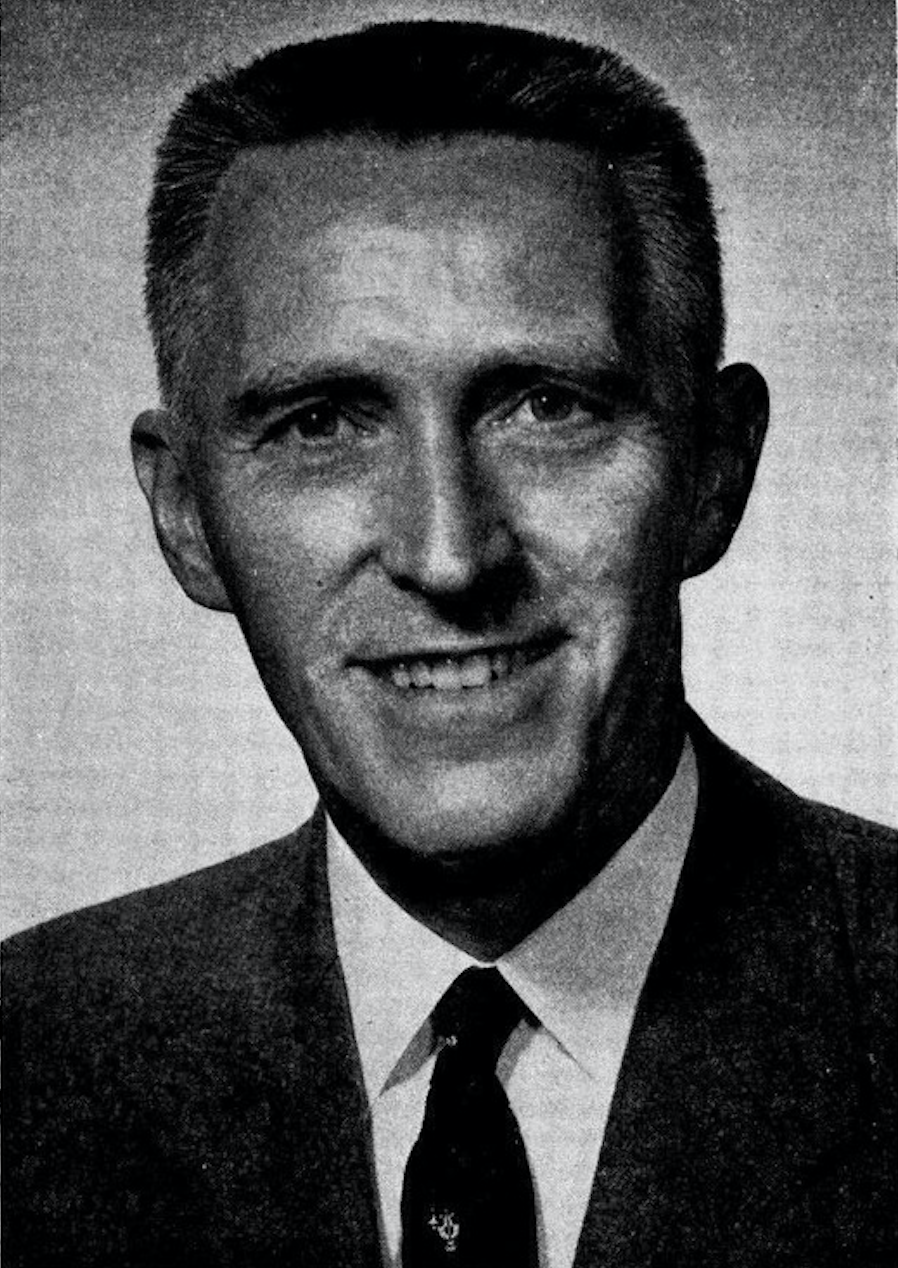

Director of the Office of Civil and Defense Mobilization
- In office July 1, 1958 – January 20, 1961
- President: Dwight D. Eisenhower
- Preceded by: Himself (Federal Civil Defense Administration); Gordon Gray (Office of Defense Mobilization)
- Succeeded by: John Patterson (acting)

Administrator of the Federal Civil Defense Administration
- In office July 19, 1957 – July 1, 1958
- President: Dwight D. Eisenhower
- Preceded by: Lewis Berry (acting)
- Succeeded by: Himself (Office of Civil and Defense Mobilization)

33rd Governor of Iowa
- In office January 13, 1955 – January 17, 1957
- Lieutenant: Leo Elthon
- Preceded by: Leo Elthon
- Succeeded by: Herschel C. Loveless

24th Attorney General of Iowa
- In office February 1953 – January 13, 1955
- Appointed by: William S. Beardsley
- Governor: William S. Beardsley; Leo Elthon
- Preceded by: Robert L. Larson
- Succeeded by: Dayton Countryman

Member of the Iowa House of Representatives
- In office 1937–1942
- Constituency: 16th district

Personal details
- Born: Leo Arthur Hoegh; March 30, 1908 Audubon, Iowa, U.S.
- Died: July 15, 2000 (aged 92) Colorado Springs, Colorado, U.S.
- Party: Republican
- Spouse: Mary Louise Foster (m. 1936)
- Children: 2
- Education: University of Iowa (BA, LLB)

Military service
- Allegiance: United States
- Branch/service: United States Army
- Years of service: 1942-1945
- Rank: Lieutenant Colonel
- Unit: 350th Infantry, Reserve; 104th Infantry Division
- Battles/wars: World War II
- Awards: Bronze Star Medal (with oak leaf cluster); Croix de Guerre (with palm); Legion of Honour

Leo Arthur Hoegh (/hɔɪɡ/); March 30, 1908 – July 15, 2000) was a decorated United States Army officer, lawyer, and politician who served as the 33rd governor of Iowa from 1955 to 1957.

His record of public service included important contributions to his home state and to his country. His career in elective office came to an early end, after his willingness to raise taxes to jump-start improvements to Iowa's roads and schools alienated his conservative Republican allies, and handed Democratic gubernatorial nominee Herschel C. Loveless an issue to exploit.

== Early life ==
Hoegh was born on a farm in Audubon, Iowa in 1908, to William Hoegh, who was the president of the farmer Savings Bank of Elkhorn, Iowa, and Annie (Johnson) Hoegh. Nels Peder Hoegh, Hoegh's grandfather, left a farm in Denmark in 1866 to search for gold in Colorado. He invested much of his newfound fortune in farmland in Audubon County, Iowa, became a community leader, and upon his death left separate farms for each of his thirteen children.

When Hoegh was born his family only spoke Danish, it was not until Leo attended school that he began to speak English. While his father ran a bank in nearby Elk Horn, Iowa, Leo decided to become a lawyer.

He received a Bachelor of Arts degree from the University of Iowa in 1929, where he distinguished himself as a captain of the water polo team and as the founding president of Gamma Nu chapter of Pi Kappa Alpha. He competed in swimming and was selected for membership the original Iowa Honor Society, forerunner to the national honor society, Omicron Delta Kappa.

As Leo graduated from the University of Iowa College of Law in 1932, his father sold all of his assets in an unsuccessful effort to prevent the Elk Horn bank from failing. Leo started private practice in Chariton, the county seat of Lucas County in south central Iowa.

He married Mary Louise Foster in 1936 and had two daughters.

== State House ==
In 1936, Hoegh was elected as a Republican to the first of his three terms in the Iowa House of Representatives, where he exhibited leadership and rose successively to become Republican Floor Leader and chairman of the Judiciary Committee. He also developed "a solid, orthodox reputation as an unrelenting penny pincher." He served from 1937 to 1942, resigning to join the war effort. While serving in the Iowa House, he also served as Chariton City Attorney from 1941 to 1942.

== World War II service ==
Hoegh resigned from the Iowa legislature when he was called up for duty as a junior officer in the Iowa National Guard in 1942.

Rising quickly in the U.S. Army, he became a Lieutenant Colonel and the operations officer for the 104th Infantry Division, nicknamed the Timberwolf Division, and wrote the operations orders that carried the 104th through to the Rhine and into Germany.

For his gallant action during World War II, Hoegh received the following decorations: the Bronze Star with cluster, Croix de Guerre with palm, and Legion of Honor. It was during those months that he first came to the attention of General Dwight D. Eisenhower, then serving as the supreme allied commander.

At war's end, when the 104th linked up with the Soviet forces in Germany, Lt. Col. Hoegh was in a group that flew behind the Soviet lines in a Piper Cub to establish liaison with Marshal Ivan Konev's advancing army. He wrote a history of the division, Timberwolf Tracks.

== Post-war activities ==
After the war, Hoegh returned to Iowa to resume his law practice in Chariton. Eager to return to public service at a higher level, he ran in the 1948 Republican primary against incumbent Republican Congressman Karl M. LeCompte. LeCompte won the primary and the general election.

Putting himself at odds with the more conservative factions that controlled the Iowa Republican Party in the decade after the end of the war, Hoegh became an active supporter of Former Minnesota Governor Harold Stassen in his bid for the 1948 Republican nomination for president, and former General Dwight Eisenhower in his bid for the 1952 Republican nomination for president.

== Iowa Attorney General ==
In February 1953, he was appointed Iowa Attorney General by Governor William Beardsley, filling a position created by Beardsley's appointment of Robert L. Larson to the Iowa Supreme Court. There, he earned a reputation as a strict law enforcer, especially of Iowa's widely ignored law against sale of liquor.

== Governorship (1955-1957) ==
In 1954, Hoegh was elected Governor of Iowa, winning a close contest over Democrat Clyde Edsel Herring, son of the former Iowa Governor and U.S. Senator, Clyde Herring.

As chief executive, he championed the cause of education and orchestrated a major increase in funding for the state universities and the public schools. He also worked to improve the state's mental institutions, changing the focus from custody to caring for and curing the mentally ill. He urged recognition of the union shop, legislative reapportionment to 'reduce the control of rural areas over the cities,' funds to promote industrial expansion, and a reduction in the voting age from 21 to 18.

In 1955, he appointed Iowa's first "Commission to Study Discrimination in Employment." The commission's report, issued the following year, identified by name the employers and supervisors alleged to have discriminated on the basis of race or religion, and recommended adoption of a state fair employment practices act. A supporter of labor unions, Hoegh urged repeal of the right-to-work law in the state.

To balance the budget while accomplishing his ambitious agenda, Hoegh sought to increase revenues by more than $31 million, to be collected through proposed increases in the taxes on beer, cigarettes and gasoline, a capital-gains tax and extension of the sales tax to include services. The Republican-controlled General Assembly approved enough tax increases to bring in $22 million a year, and Hoegh found himself labelled by his Democratic opponents as "High-Tax Hoegh." Meanwhile, his support for a union shop alienated a traditional ally of Iowa Republicans, the Iowa Manufacturers Association, without disturbing labor's allegiance to the Iowa Democratic Party.

In his race for re-election in 1956, Hoegh won the Republican primary. Two weeks before the election, Time Magazine placed Hoegh's face on its cover. The cover story ended with this prediction:

His principal problem is that he has caught the spirit of an era that is beginning to recognize the need for a resurgence of good local and state government—and, in doing so, he has perhaps stirred his quiet state too much. But if he has gone too far too fast, he can take a governor's small comfort from the conviction that one year—if not this year—his state will forget the anthills and look with satisfaction on the considerable movements of home-grown progressive government.

Hoegh lost to Democratic nominee Herschel C. Loveless, by 29,469 votes.

== Post-Governorship Offices ==
In July 1957, President Dwight D. Eisenhower appointed him as federal administrator of civil defense. In 1958, Eisenhower appointed Hoegh director of the Office of Civil and Defense Mobilization. He was a member of the National Security Council, and helped to represent the United States at emergency planning meetings with NATO.

After John F. Kennedy's inauguration, Hoegh moved into the private sector, heading the backyard bomb-shelter division of Wonder Building Corporation of Chicago. and he returned to practicing law.

== Later life ==
In 1964, he moved to Denver, then Chipita Park, and finally Colorado Springs. Hoegh moved his law practice to Chipita Park, Colorado, where he practiced from 1965 until his retirement in 1985. He died in Colorado Springs, Colorado in 2000, and was interred there at the Evergreen Cemetery.

Many of his ancestors reside in the Danish community of Elk Horn, Iowa and the extended areas of Audubon and Shelby County.

== See also ==
- List of Iowa attorneys general
- List of governors of Iowa
- List of Danish Americans

Legal offices
Preceded by Robert L. Larson	Attorney General of Iowa; 1953–1955	Succeeded by Dayton Countryman
Party political offices
Preceded by William S. Beardsley	Republican nominee for Governor of Iowa; 1954, 1956	Succeeded by William G. Murray
Political offices
Preceded by Leo Elthon	Governor of Iowa; 1955–1957	Succeeded by Herschel C. Loveless
Preceded by Lewis Berry; Acting	Administrator of the Federal Civil Defense Administration; 1957–1958	Succeeded by Himself as Director of the Office of Civil and Defense Mobilization
Preceded by Himself as Administrator of the Federal Civil Defense Administration	Director of the Office of Civil and Defense Mobilization; 1958–1961	Succeeded by John Patterson; Acting
Preceded by Gordon Gray as Director of the Office of Defense Mobilization	Director of the Office of Civil and Defense Mobilization; 1958–1961	Succeeded by John Patterson; Acting
