= 1946 Iowa gubernatorial election =

- November 5, 1946
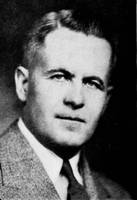

Nominee	Robert D. Blue	Frank Miles
Party	Republican	Democratic
Popular vote	362,592	266,190
Percentage	57.40%	42.14%
- County results Blue: 40–50% 50–60% 60–70% 70–80% Miles: 50–60%
Governor before election
Robert D. Blue
Republican
Elected Governor
Robert D. Blue
Republican

The 1946 Iowa gubernatorial election was held on November 5, 1946. Incumbent Republican Robert D. Blue defeated Democratic nominee Frank Miles with 57.40% of the vote.

== Primary elections ==
Primary elections were held on June 3, 1946.

=== Democratic primary ===
==== Candidates ====
- Frank Miles, Editor of the Iowa Legionnaire

==== Results ====
Democratic primary results
Party	Candidate	Votes	%
Democratic	Frank Miles	50,385	100.00
Total votes		50,385	100.00

=== Republican primary ===
==== Candidates ====
- Robert D. Blue, incumbent Governor
- George H. Olmsted, United States Army General

==== Results ====
Republican primary results
Party	Candidate	Votes	%
Republican	Robert D. Blue (incumbent)	141,024	63.63
Republican	George H. Olmsted	80,590	36.37
Total votes			

== General election ==
=== Candidates ===
Major party candidates

- Robert D. Blue, Republican
- Frank Miles, Democratic

Other candidates

- E. P. Gabriel, Prohibition

=== Results ===
1946 Iowa gubernatorial election
Party	Candidate	Votes	%	±%
Republican	Robert D. Blue (incumbent)	362,592	57.40%	
Democratic	Frank Miles	266,190	42.14%	
Prohibition	E. P. Gabriel	2,899	0.46%	
Majority		96,402		
Turnout		631,681		
Republican hold		Swing		
