= Fertile, Iowa =

- City
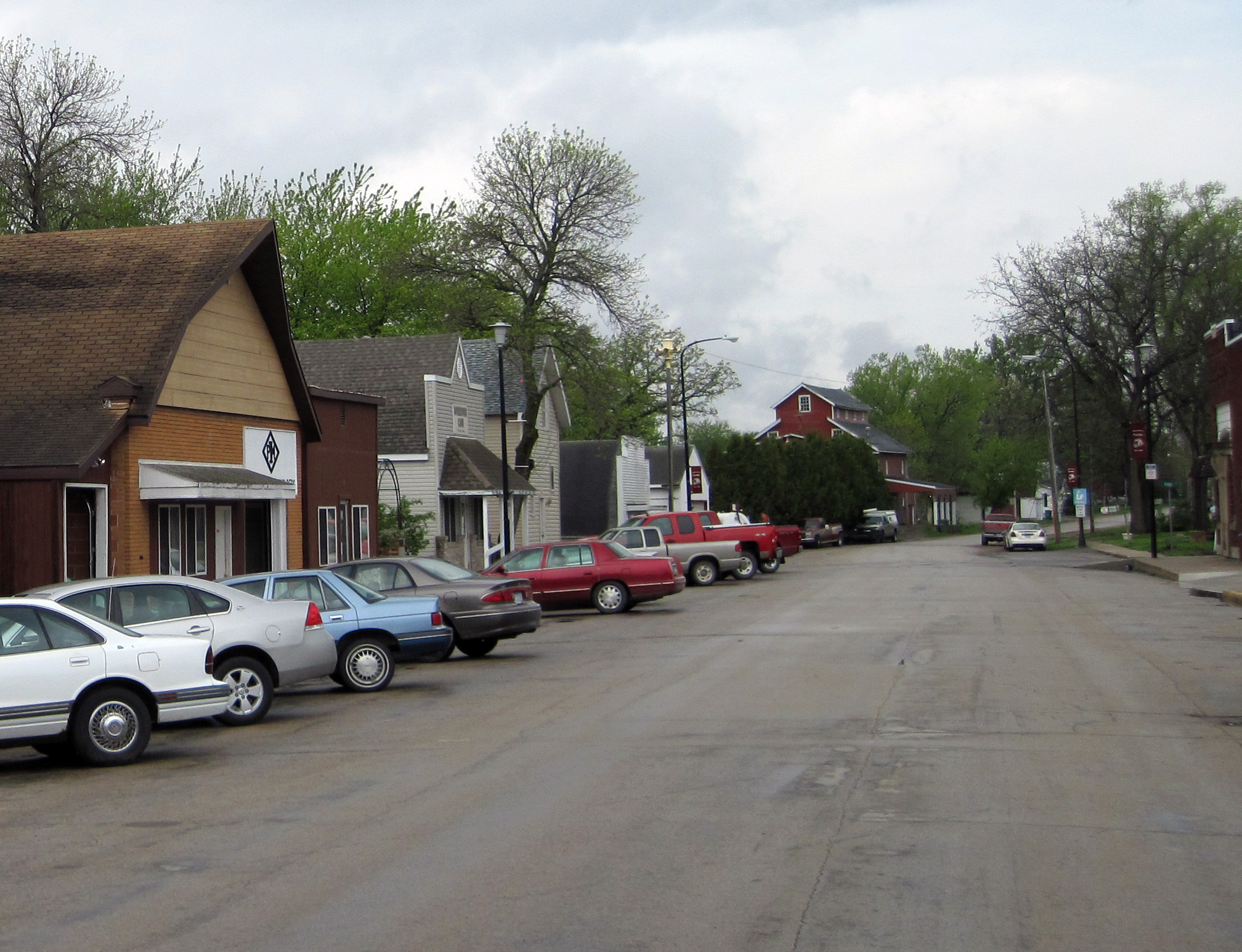
- Street in Fertile

- Location of Fertile, Iowa
- Coordinates: 43°15′44″N 93°25′24″W
- Country: USA
- State: Iowa
- County: Worth

Government
  - Type: Mayor

Area
  - Total: 0.94 sq mi (2.44 km^{2})
  - Land: 0.94 sq mi (2.44 km^{2})
  - Water: 0 sq mi (0.00 km^{2})
- Elevation: 1,168 ft (356 m)

Population (2020)
  - Total: 305
  - Density: 324.2/sq mi (125.19/km^{2})
- Time zone: UTC-6 (Central (CST))
  - Summer (DST): UTC-5 (CDT)
- ZIP code: 50434
- Area code: 641
- FIPS code: 19-27390
- GNIS feature ID: 2394762
- Website: www.fertileiowa.us

Fertile is a city in Worth County, Iowa, United States. The population was 305 at the time of the 2020 census. It is part of the Mason City Micropolitan Statistical Area.

== History ==
The community was first called Rhodes Mill after William Rhodes, who settled there in 1856 and built a house. A land speculator created a fictional town nearby and named it Fontanelle, though the locals called it Putsey. Fertile was established in 1877, and named for the quality of the soil in the valley it was located in. Fertile was incorporated in 1908.

Rhodes Mill is listed on the National Register of Historic Places.

== Geography ==
According to the United States Census Bureau, the city has a total area of 0.94 square miles (2.43 km^{2}), all land.

== Demographics ==
Historical populations
Year	Pop.	±%
1910	207	—
1920	223	+7.7%
1930	238	+6.7%
1940	276	+16.0%
1950	397	+43.8%
1960	386	−2.8%
1970	394	+2.1%
1980	372	−5.6%
1990	382	+2.7%
2000	360	−5.8%
2010	370	+2.8%
2020	305	−17.6%
Source:"U.S. Census website". United States Census Bureau. and Iowa Data Center; Source: U.S. Decennial Census

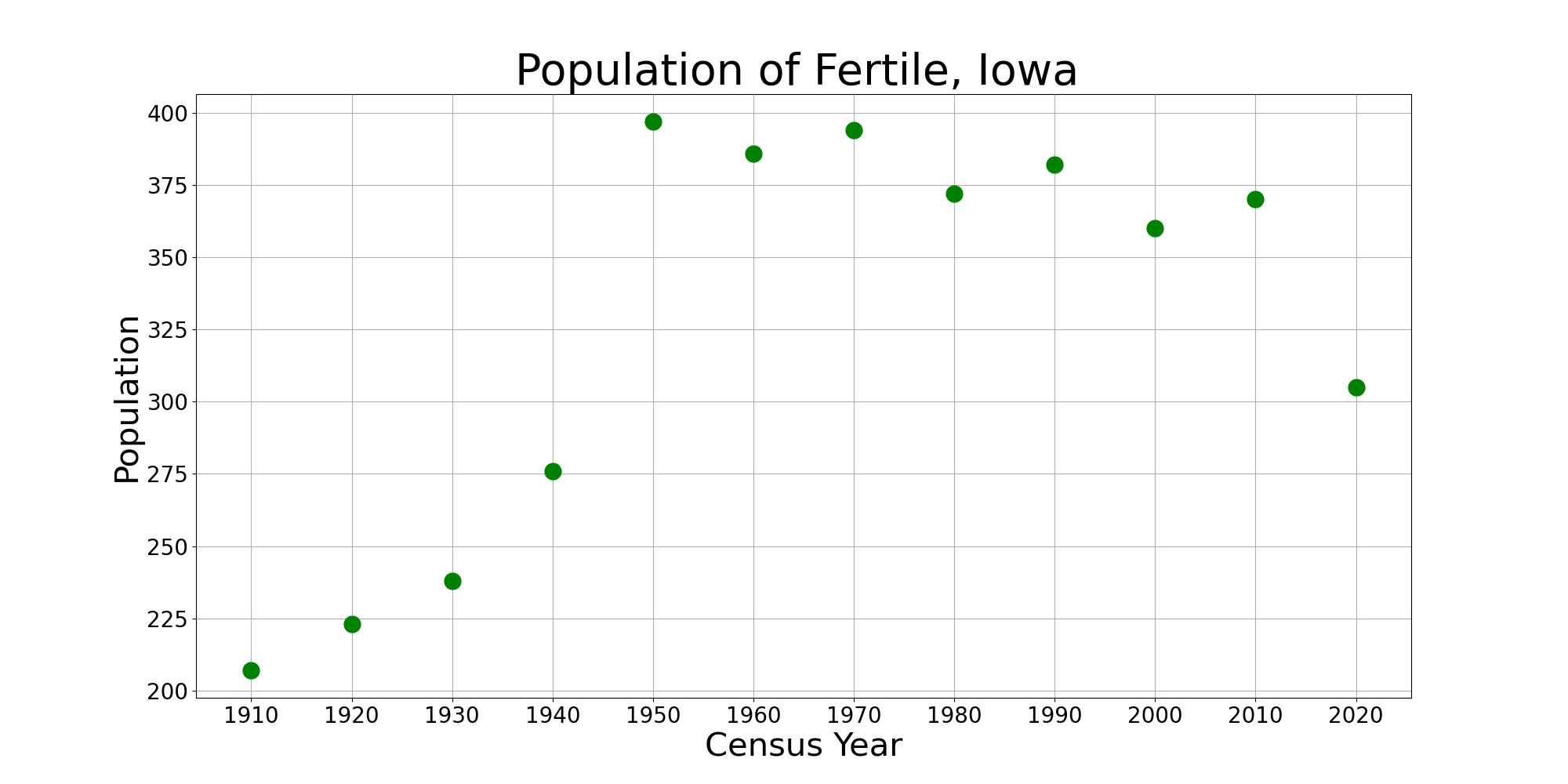
The population of Fertile, Iowa from US census data

=== 2020 census ===
As of the census of 2020, there were 305 people, 133 households, and 93 families residing in the city. The population density was 324.2 inhabitants per square mile (125.2/km^{2}). There were 154 housing units at an average density of 163.7 per square mile (63.2/km^{2}). The racial makeup of the city was 92.8% White, 0.7% Black or African American, 0.0% Native American, 0.7% Asian, 0.0% Pacific Islander, 0.3% from other races and 5.6% from two or more races. Hispanic or Latino persons of any race comprised 4.3% of the population.

Of the 133 households, 24.8% of which had children under the age of 18 living with them, 54.9% were married couples living together, 10.5% were cohabitating couples, 18.8% had a female householder with no spouse or partner present and 15.8% had a male householder with no spouse or partner present. 30.1% of all households were non-families. 25.6% of all households were made up of individuals, 6.0% had someone living alone who was 65 years old or older.

The median age in the city was 44.2 years. 22.6% of the residents were under the age of 20; 4.9% were between the ages of 20 and 24; 23.3% were from 25 and 44; 25.9% were from 45 and 64; and 23.3% were 65 years of age or older. The gender makeup of the city was 51.1% male and 48.9% female.

=== 2010 census ===
As of the census of 2010, there were 370 people, 148 households, and 111 families residing in the city. The population density was 393.6 inhabitants per square mile (152.0/km^{2}). There were 161 housing units at an average density of 171.3 per square mile (66.1/km^{2}). The racial makeup of the city was 97.8% White, 0.5% African American, 1.1% Native American, 0.3% Asian, and 0.3% from two or more races. Hispanic or Latino people of any race were 4.9% of the population.

There were 148 households, of which 30.4% had children under the age of 18 living with them, 64.2% were married couples living together, 4.7% had a female householder with no husband present, 6.1% had a male householder with no wife present, and 25.0% were non-families. 19.6% of all households were made up of individuals, and 8.1% had someone living alone who was 65 years of age or older. The average household size was 2.50 and the average family size was 2.88.

The median age in the city was 41 years. 23.5% of residents were under the age of 18; 5.7% were between the ages of 18 and 24; 25.5% were from 25 to 44; 27.8% were from 45 to 64; and 17.3% were 65 years of age or older. The gender makeup of the city was 51.9% male and 48.1% female.

=== 2000 census ===
As of the census of 2000, there were 360 people, 149 households, and 102 families residing in the city. The population density was 382.9 inhabitants per square mile (147.8/km^{2}). There were 161 housing units at an average density of 171.3 per square mile (66.1/km^{2}). The racial makeup of the city was 95.83% White, 0.56% African American, 0.28% Native American, 3.06% from other races, and 0.28% from two or more races. Hispanic or Latino people of any race were 2.50% of the population.

There were 149 households, out of which 32.2% had children under the age of 18 living with them, 60.4% were married couples living together, 7.4% had a female householder with no husband present, and 30.9% were non-families. 26.2% of all households were made up of individuals, and 17.4% had someone living alone who was 65 years of age or older. The average household size was 2.42 and the average family size was 2.94.

In the city, the population was spread out, with 24.2% under the age of 18, 5.8% from 18 to 24, 26.9% from 25 to 44, 25.8% from 45 to 64, and 17.2% who were 65 years of age or older. The median age was 41 years. For every 100 females, there were 90.5 males. For every 100 females age 18 and over, there were 88.3 males.

The median income for a household in the city was $33,558, and the median income for a family was $36,500. Males had a median income of $26,583 versus $20,179 for females. The per capita income for the city was $14,464. About 4.5% of families and 9.3% of the population were below the poverty line, including 17.5% of those under age 18 and 7.8% of those age 65 or over.

== Education ==
Residents are part of the Forest City Community School District.

== Notable people ==
Leo Elthon, the 32nd Governor of Iowa, was born in Fertile.
