= John E. Mulroney =

Iowa Supreme Court justice (1896–1979)

John Mulroney

Judge of the United States Tax Court
- In office October 11, 1955 – April 30, 1966
- Appointed by: Dwight D. Eisenhower

Chief Justice of the Iowa Supreme Court
- In office July 1, 1952 – December 31, 1952
- Preceded by: G. King Thompson
- Succeeded by: William A. Smith
- In office January 1, 1948 – June 30, 1948
- Preceded by: Ralph A. Oliver
- Succeeded by: Halleck J. Mantz
- In office July 1, 1943 – December 31, 1943
- Preceded by: Theodore G. Garfield
- Succeeded by: William A. Smith

Associate Justice of the Iowa Supreme Court
- In office January 1, 1943 – October 11, 1955
- Preceded by: Richard F. Mitchell
- Succeeded by: Henry F. Peterson

Personal details
- Born: February 15, 1896
- Died: May 18, 1979 (aged 83)

John Edward Mulroney (February 15, 1896 – May 18, 1979) was a justice of the Iowa Supreme Court and later a judge of the United States Tax Court.

== Life ==
Born in Ruthven, Iowa, Mulrony attended Creighton University in Omaha, Nebraska in 1915, and then served in the Rainbow Division during World War I, before receiving an LL.B. from the University of Iowa, in 1922.

He was a county attorney for Webster County, Iowa from 1929 to 1933, and was assistant attorney general of Iowa from 1939 to 1942. He became a justice of the Iowa Supreme Court from January 1, 1943, to October 11, 1955, appointed from Webster County, Iowa. He resigned from the Iowa Supreme Court to accept an appointment by President Dwight Eisenhower to a seat on the United States Tax Court. He retired on April 30, 1966, but was recalled to perform further judicial duties, continuing in that capacity until December 31, 1970.

Mulroney married Martha O'Connor in 1929.

Political offices
Preceded by Richard F. Mitchell	Justice of the Iowa Supreme Court; 1943–1955	Succeeded by Henry F. Peterson
