= Smiley Bonham =

American politician

Smiley Hughes Bonham (May 29, 1814 – April 18, 1879) was an American politician.

Bonham was born in Knox County, Ohio, on May 29, 1814, and moved steadily westward, eventually settling in Washington Township, Johnson County, Iowa. He was elected to the first and second Iowa General Assemblies as a Democratic Party member of the Iowa House of Representatives for District 16, serving continuously from November 30, 1846 to December 1, 1850. From December 4, 1848, the start of his second consecutive term, Bonham was also house speaker. Later, Bonham moved to Clarke County, and held the District 13 seat between January 12, 1874 and January 9, 1876, while affiliated with the Anti-Monopoly Party. Bonham died on April 18, 1879, at the age of 64.
