= Theodore G. Garfield =

American judge

Theodore Garfield

Chief Justice of the Iowa Supreme Court
- In office January 1, 1961 – November 11, 1969
- Preceded by: Robert L. Larson
- Succeeded by: C. Edwin Moore
- In office June 1, 1958 – December 31, 1958
- Preceded by: Henry K. Peterson
- Succeeded by: G. King Thompson
- In office July 1, 1954 – December 31, 1954
- Preceded by: William L. Bliss
- Succeeded by: Charles F. Wennerstrum
- In office July 1, 1950 – December 31, 1950
- Preceded by: William L. Bliss
- Succeeded by: Charles F. Wennerstrum
- In office July 1, 1946 – December 31, 1946
- Preceded by: William L. Bliss
- Succeeded by: Charles F. Wennerstrum
- In office January 1, 1943 – June 30, 1943
- Preceded by: Charles F. Wennerstrum
- Succeeded by: John E. Mulroney

Associate Justice of the Iowa Supreme Court
- In office January 1, 1941 – November 11, 1969
- Preceded by: Paul W. Richards

Judge of Iowa's 11th Judicial District
- In office January 1, 1927 – January 1, 1941

Personal details
- Born: November 12, 1894 Humboldt, Iowa, U.S.
- Died: November 4, 1989 (aged 94) Ames, Iowa, U.S.
- Spouse: Carolyn
- Children: 4

Military service
- Branch/service: United States Army
- Years of service: 1917-1918
- Rank: Lieutenant

Theodore G. Garfield (November 12, 1894 – November 4, 1989) served as a justice of the Iowa Supreme Court longer than all but one other justice from January 1, 1941, until his retirement on November 11, 1969.

== Early life ==
Born in Humboldt, Iowa to George S. and Mary (White) Garfield, he received a BA from the University of Iowa in 1915 and his LLB from the University of Iowa Law in 1917. Immediately thereafter, he volunteered for military service in the United States Army, He was on a tour of duty as a lieutenant teaching artillery fire at Fort Sill, Oklahoma, at the time the armistice ended World War I in 1918.

== Legal and judicial career ==
He entered the private practice of law at Ames, Iowa, as the junior partner of Lee & Garfield. In 1926, he was elected as a Republican as a trial-court judge for Iowa's Eleventh Judicial District. He served in this position from January 1927 until his elevation to the Supreme Court in 1941.

According to the Iowa Official Register, he served as Chief Justice on rotation first half of 1943 and last half of 1946, 1950, 1954 and 1958. He was then elected to serve as Chief Justice from 1961 until his retirement in 1969.

After mandatory retirement from the court, he returned to the practice of law at Ames. Soon after his retirement, he agreed to serve as a hearing officer for University of Iowa students and groups subjected to discipline as part of antiwar activities.

Garfield's 28-year-tenure on the Iowa Supreme Court was not exceeded until 2006 by Justice Jerry L. Larson, who retired soon thereafter.

Political offices
Preceded by Paul W. Richards	Justice of the Iowa Supreme Court; 1941–1969	Succeeded by
