= Henry K. Peterson =

American judge (1884–1966)

Henry Peterson

Chief Justice of the Iowa Supreme Court
- In office January 1, 1958 – June 1, 1958
- Preceded by: Norman Hays
- Succeeded by: Theodore G. Garfield

Associate Justice of the Iowa Supreme Court
- In office November 3, 1955 – June 30, 1965
- Preceded by: John E. Mulroney
- Succeeded by: Maurice E. Rawlings

Personal details
- Born: March 16, 1884
- Died: October 7, 1966 (aged 82)

Henry K. Peterson (March 16, 1884 – October 7, 1966) was a justice of the Iowa Supreme Court from November 3, 1955, to June 30, 1965. He was appointed from Pottawattamie County, Iowa. He served as chief justice for six months.

Political offices
Preceded by John E. Mulroney	Justice of the Iowa Supreme Court; 1955–1965	Succeeded by Maurice E. Rawlings
