= S. Addison Oliver =

American politician (1833–1912)

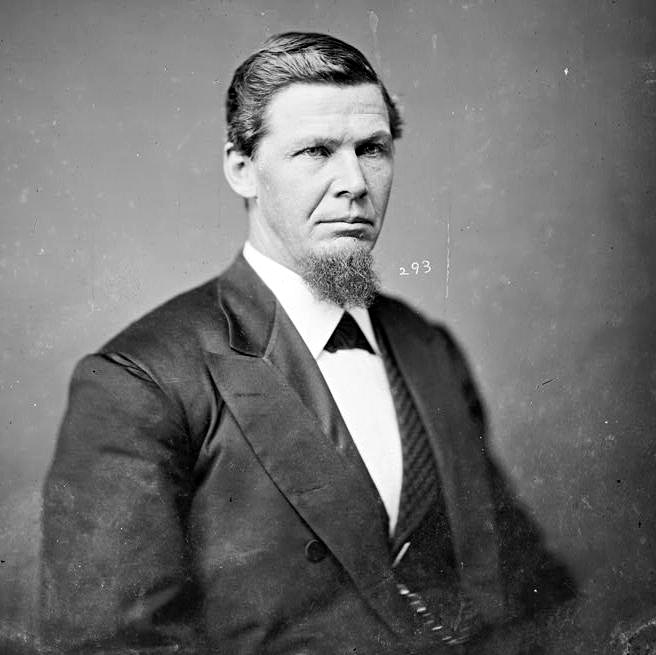

Member of the U.S. House of Representatives from Iowa's 9th district
- In office March 4, 1875 – March 3, 1879
- Preceded by: Jackson Orr
- Succeeded by: Cyrus C. Carpenter

Personal details
- Born: July 21, 1833 Washington, Pennsylvania, U.S.
- Died: July 7, 1912 (aged 78) Onawa, Iowa, U.S
- Party: Republican
- Relatives: Ralph A. Oliver (grandson)
- Education: Washington & Jefferson College

Samuel Addison Oliver (July 21, 1833 – July 7, 1912) was an American pioneer, lawyer, judge, and politician from western Iowa.

== Life ==
He was born near Washington, Washington County, Pennsylvania, in 1834, and received a classical education at the common schools and West Alexandria Academy. He graduated from Washington College in Washington, Pennsylvania (now Washington & Jefferson College) in 1850. He taught school for two years in Arkansas, returning to Pennsylvania to study law. He married Hannah Towne on January 1, 1854. He was admitted to the bar, and moved to Iowa in 1857, taking up his residence at Onawa, in Monona County, where he began practice law. He was county supervisor in 1861, and served as provost marshal during the Civil War.

Oliver was elected to the Iowa House of Representatives of the Tenth Iowa General Assembly in 1863, to represent the district composed of the counties of Carroll, Crawford, Monona and Sac. He was a delegate to the Republican National Convention in 1864. He became a prominent member of the Iowa House, and at the close of his term was elected to the Iowa Senate for the Forty-fifth District, composed of fifteen counties in the northwestern part of the State, serving from 1865 to 1867. He was then chosen as circuit judge, and was twice re-elected, serving from 1868 to 1875.

In 1874 he was elected as a Republican to represent Iowa's 9th congressional district in the United States House of Representatives. After serving in the 44th United States Congress, he was re-elected in 1876 to a two-year second term, then served in the 45th United States Congress. In all, he served in Congress from March 4, 1875, to March 3, 1879.

Oliver was mayor of Onawa several times. He became one of the most extensive farmers in western Iowa after retiring from public life. Addison and Hannah Oliver had ten children, one of whom, Cyrus G. Oliver, became a member of the Iowa General Assembly. He died in Onawa, and was interred in Onawa Cemetery. His grandson, Ralph A. Oliver, was a Chief Justice of the Iowa Supreme Court.

U.S. House of Representatives
Preceded by Jackson Orr	Member of the U.S. House of Representatives from Iowa's 9th congressional district 1875–1879	Succeeded by Cyrus C. Carpenter
