= Wilson H. Hamilton =

American judge (1877–1949)

Wilson Hamilton

Chief Justice of the Iowa Supreme Court
- In office January 1, 1940 – June 30, 1940
- Preceded by: Ralph A. Oliver
- In office July 1, 1937 – December 31, 1937

Associate Justice of the Iowa Supreme Court
- In office January 1, 1935 – December 31, 1940

Personal details
- Born: March 16, 1874
- Died: December 17, 1956 (aged 82)

Wilson H. Hamilton (May 1, 1877 – December 15, 1949) was a justice of the Iowa Supreme Court from January 1, 1935, to December 31, 1940, appointed from Keokuk County, Iowa. He was elected Chief Justice on July 1, 1937.

Political offices
| Preceded by Court substantially remade | Justice of the Iowa Supreme Court; 1935–1940 | Succeeded by |
