= James M. Parsons =

Iowa Supreme Court justice (1858–1937)

James Parsons

Justice of the Iowa Supreme Court
- In office January 1, 1935 – December 16, 1937

Personal details
- Born: October 16, 1858
- Died: December 16, 1937 (aged 79)

James M. Parsons (October 16, 1858 – December 16, 1937) was a justice of the Iowa Supreme Court from January 1, 1935, to December 16, 1937, appointed from Polk County, Iowa.

Political offices
Preceded by Court substantially remade	Justice of the Iowa Supreme Court; 1935–1937	Succeeded by Ernest M. Miller
