= Washington Township, Butler County, Iowa =

Township in Iowa, US

Washington Township, Butler County
- Township
- Coordinates: 42°35′44″N 092°58′19″W
- Country: United States
- State: Iowa
- County: Butler

Area
  - Total: 36.1 sq mi (93.6 km^{2})
  - Land: 36.1 sq mi (93.5 km^{2})
  - Water: 0.039 sq mi (0.1 km^{2})
- Elevation: 1,030 ft (314 m)

Population (2020)
  - Total: 326
  - Density: 9.1/sq mi (3.5/km^{2})
- FIPS code: 19-94464
- GNIS feature ID: 0468906

Washington Township is one of sixteen townships in Butler County, Iowa, USA. As of the 2020 census, its population was 326.

== Geography ==
Washington Township covers an area of 36.14 square miles (93.6 km^{2}) and contains no incorporated settlements. According to the USGS, it contains two cemeteries: Memorial Park and the cemetery at Washington Reformed Church.
