= William S. Beardsley =

American politician (1901–1954)

Bill Beardsley
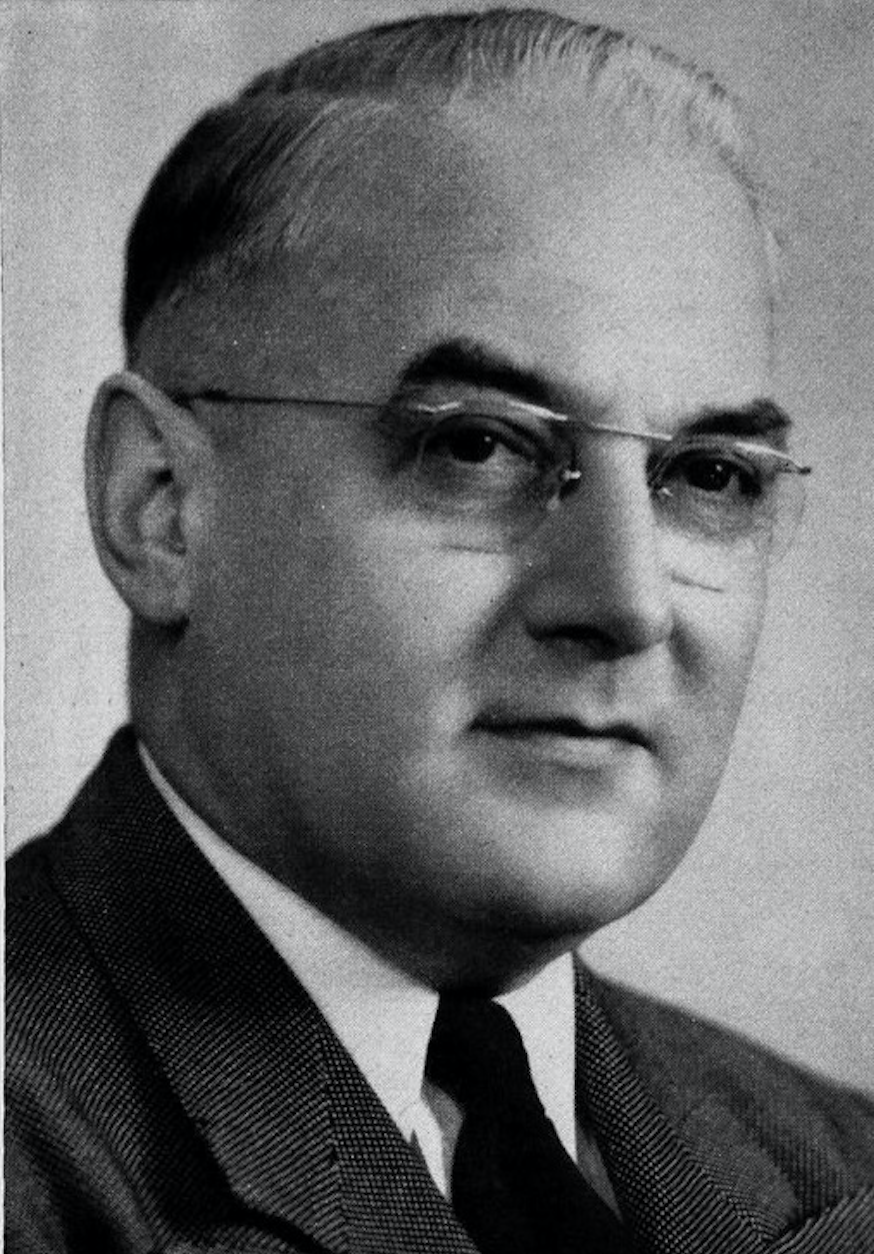

31st Governor of Iowa
- In office January 13, 1949 – November 21, 1954
- Lieutenant: Kenneth A. Evans (1949–1951); William H. Nicholas (1951–1953); Leo Elthon (1953–1954)
- Preceded by: Robert D. Blue
- Succeeded by: Leo Elthon

Member of the Iowa House of Representatives from the 27th district
- In office January 13, 1947 – January 9, 1949
- Preceded by: Howard E. Felton
- Succeeded by: Carroll Brown

Member of the Iowa Senate from the 11th district
- In office January 9, 1933 – January 12, 1941
- Preceded by: Wesley Lowe
- Succeeded by: Floyd Jones

Personal details
- Born: May 13, 1901 Beacon, Iowa, U.S.
- Died: November 21, 1954 (aged 53) Des Moines, Iowa, U.S.
- Party: Republican
- Spouse: Charlotte E. Manning (m. 1919)
- Children: 5
- Education: Bowen Institute of Pharmacy and Chemistry (PharmD)

William Shane Beardsley (May 13, 1901 – November 21, 1954) was an American politician. He served in the Iowa Senate from 1933 to 1941, and was a member of the Iowa House of Representatives between 1947 and 1949. Beardsley was the 31st governor of Iowa from 1949 to 1954.

== Early life ==
Beardsley was born in Beacon, Iowa to William Beardsley, a pharmacist and Carrie Shane, and grew up in Birmingham, Iowa. He worked in his father's pharmacy after school until his father died in 1914.

He attended pharmacy school at Bowen Institute of Pharmacy and Chemistry in Brunswick, Missouri and graduated in 1921. He then established a drugstore in New Virginia, Iowa in 1922.

He attended Methodist Church. In June 1919, he married Charlotte Ellen Manning and had 5 children. One son, William Shane Beardsley Jr., died of Polio in 1930 at age 11.

== Political career ==
=== State Senate and House ===
He was elected to the Iowa Senate, and served from 1933 to 1941. In 1941, he retired from politics and he raised cattle and hogs on his farm in New Virginia and focused on his drugstore.

He was appointed to the Iowa House of Representatives in 1947 to fill the term of Harold Felton, who had died of a heart attack in December 1946. He became a prominent opponent of the labor and education policies of Governor Robert D. Blue, a fellow Republican.

=== Governorship ===
In June 1948, Beardsley successfully challenged Blue in the Republican primary, and went on to an easy victory in the general election.

Beardsley was known for his advocacy of a balanced state budget, and his opposition to the Truman administration's Brannan Plan. He was reelected in 1950 and 1952, but chose not to run for a fourth term in 1954. During his tenure the following notable accomplishments were achieved: workmen's compensation benefits were increased; the highway patrol was expanded; anti-gambling laws were sanctioned; roads, schools, and institutions were all advanced; and a World War II veteran's bonus was authorized.

== Death ==
On November 21, 1954, Beardsley was killed in a highway accident, where he came over a hill and hit the back end of a pickup truck that had slowed to help another motorist, on Iowa 60 just north of Des Moines. He was returning, with his wife, from a visit to his son, Dan, a student at Iowa State University in Ames, Iowa. Unfortunately, Dan was at the movies and did not get to visit with his parents. Dan heard about his father's death on the radio. Charlotte had been injured to the point of partial paralysis.

President Eisenhower released a statement the next day saying:

I WAS SHOCKED to hear of the tragic accident which took the life of Governor William S. Beardsley of the State of Iowa. The people of Iowa have lost a devoted public servant whom they elected three times as Chief Executive of their State. Mrs. Eisenhower and I extend to Mrs. Beardsley our deep sympathy in the great personal loss she has sustained.

He was interred at the New Virginia Cemetery in New Virginia, Iowa.

Charlotte died in 1995 of a heart issue in Des Moines, aged 93.

Party political offices
Preceded by Robert D. Blue	Republican nominee Governor of Iowa; 1948, 1950, 1952	Succeeded by Leo Hoegh
Political offices
Preceded by Robert D. Blue	Governor of Iowa; 1949–1954	Succeeded by Leo Elthon
