= List of speakers of the Iowa House of Representatives =

Speaker of Iowa House of Representatives

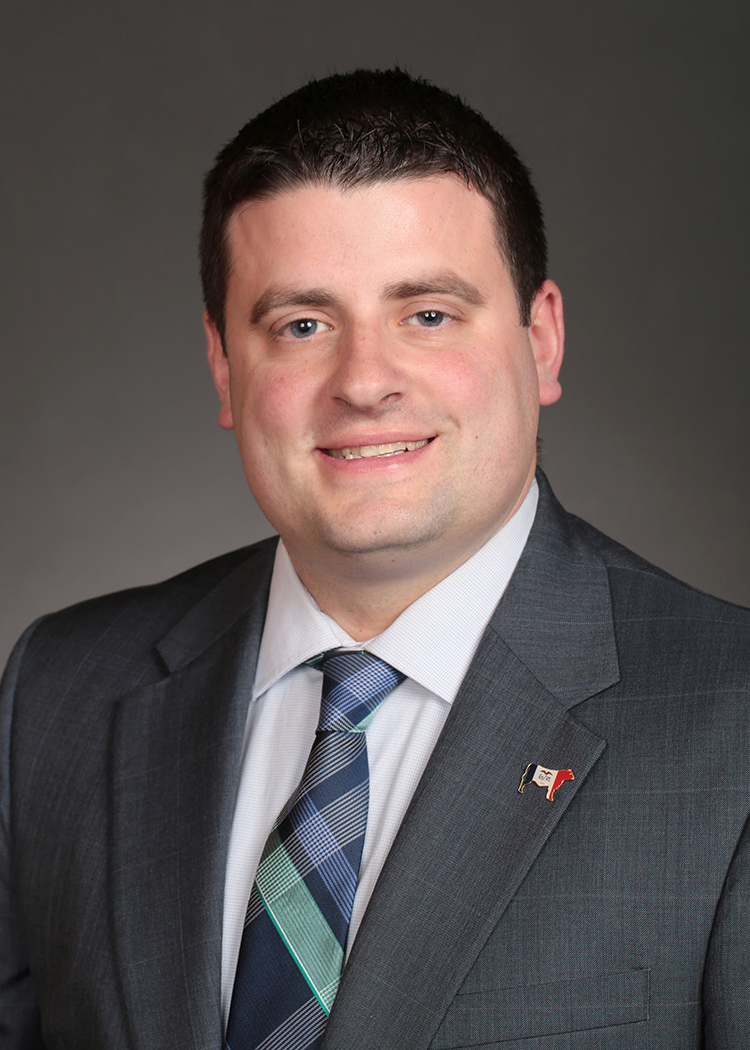
- Incumbent; Pat Grassley since January 13, 2020
- Status: Presiding officer
- Seat: Iowa State Capitol, Des Moines
- Appointer: Iowa House of Representatives
- Inaugural holder: Jesse B. Browne

The following is a list of speakers of the Iowa House of Representatives since statehood.

== Speakers of the Iowa House of Representatives ==
Speaker	Term	Party	County/Residence	Notes	Citation
Jesse B. Browne	1846–1848	Whig	Lee County		
Smiley Bonham	1848–1850	Democratic	Johnson County		
George Temple	1850–1852	Democratic	Des Moines County		
James Grant	1852–1854	Democratic	Scott County		
Reuben Noble	1854–1856	Whig	Clayton County		
Samuel McFarland	1856–1858	Republican	Henry County		
Stephen B. Shelledy	1858–1860	Republican	Jasper County		
John Edwards	1860–1862	Republican	Lucas County		
Rush Clark	1862–1864	Republican	Johnson County		
Jacob Butler	1864–1866	Republican	Muscatine County		
Ed Wright	1866–1868	Republican	Cedar County		
John Russell	1868–1870	Republican	Jones County		
Aylett R. Cotton	1870–1872	Republican	Clinton County		
James Wilson	1872–1874	Republican	Tama County		
John H. Gear	1874–1878	Republican	Des Moines County		
John Young Stone	1878–1880	Republican	Des Moines County		
Lore Alford	1880–1882	Republican	Mills County		
George R. Struble	1882–1884	Republican	Black Hawk County		
William P. Wolf	1884–1886	Republican	Tama County		
Albert Head	1886–1888	Republican	Greene County		
William H. Redman	1888–1890	Republican	Poweshiek County		
John Taylor Hamilton	1890–1892	Democratic	Linn County		
William O. Mitchell	1892–1894	Republican	Adams County		
Henry Stone	1894–1896	Republican	Marshall County		
Howard W. Byers	1896–1898	Republican	Shelby County		
James H. Funk	1898–1900	Republican	Hardin County		
Daniel H. Bowen	1900–1902	Republican	Allamakee County		
Willard L. Eaton	1902–1904	Republican	Mitchell County		
George W. Clarke	1904–1908	Republican	Dallas County		
Nathan E. Kendall	1908–1909	Republican	Dallas County		
Guy A. Feely	1909–1911	Republican	Black Hawk County		
Paul E. Stillman	1911–1913	Republican	Greene County		
Edward H. Cunningham	1913–1915	Republican	Buena Vista County		
William I. Atkinson	1915–1917	Republican	Butler County		
Milton B. Pitt	1917–1919	Republican	Harrison County		
Arch McFarlane	1919–1923	Republican	Black Hawk County		
Joseph H. Anderson	1923–1925	Republican	Winnebago County		
Willis C. Edson	1925–1927	Republican	Burna Vista County		
Luther V. Carter	1928–1929	Republican	Hardin County		
Joseph H. Johnson	1929–1931	Republican	Marion County		
Francis Johnson	1931–1933	Republican	Dickinson County		
George E. Miller	1933–1935	Democratic	Shelby County		
John H. Mitchell	1935–1937	Democratic	Webster County		
Lamar P. Foster	1937–1939	Democratic	Cedar County		
John R. Irwin	1939–1941	Republican	Lee County		
Robert D. Blue	1941–1943	Republican	Wright County		
Henry Burma	1943–1945	Republican	Butler County		
Harold Felton	1945–1946	Republican	Warren County		
Gus Kuester	1947–1955	Republican	Cass County		
William Lynes	1951–1955	Republican	Bremer County		
Arthur C. Hanson	1955–1957	Republican	Lyon County		
William L. Mooty	1957–1959	Republican	Grundy County		
Charles Vernon Lisle	1959–1961	Republican	Page County		
Henry C. Nelson	1961–1963	Republican	Winnebago County		
Robert W. Naden	1963–1965	Republican	Hamilton County		
Vincent B. Steffen	1965–1967	Democratic	Chickasaw County		
Maurice Baringer	1967–1969	Republican	Fayette County		
William H. Harbor	1969–1973	Republican	Mills County		
Andrew P. Varley	1973–1975	Republican	Adair, Guthrie County		
Dale M. Cochran	1975–1979	Democratic	Webster, Humboldt County		
Floyd H. Millen	1979–1981	Republican	Van Buren County		
William H. Harbor	1980	Republican	Mills County		
Del Stromer	1981–1983	Republican	Hancock County		
Donald D. Avenson	1983–1990	Democratic	Fayette County		
Robert C. Arnould	1991–1992	Democratic	Scott County		
Harold Van Maanen	1993–1994	Republican	Mahaska, Marion County		
Ron Corbett	1995–1999	Republican	Linn County		
Brent Siegrist	1999–2002	Republican	Pottawattamie County		
Christopher Rants	2003–2006	Republican	Woodbury County		
Pat Murphy	2007–2011	Democratic	Dubuque County		
Kraig Paulsen	2011–2015	Republican	Linn County		
Linda Upmeyer	2016–2020	Republican			
Pat Grassley	2020–	Republican			

== Speakers of the Iowa Territorial House of Representatives ==
Speaker	Term	Party	County/Residence	Notes	Citation
William Henson Wallace	1838–1839	Whig	Henry		
Edward Johnstone	1839–1840	Democratic	Lee		
Thomas Cox	1840–1841	Democratic	Jackson		
Warner Lewis	1831–1842	Democratic	Dubuque		
James McGowan Morgan	1842–1843	Democratic	Des Moines		
James P. Carleton	1843–1845	Democratic	Johnson		
James McGowan Morgan	1845	Democratic	Des Moines		
George W. McCleary	1845–1846	Democratic	Louisa		
