= Leo Elthon =

American politician (1898–1967)

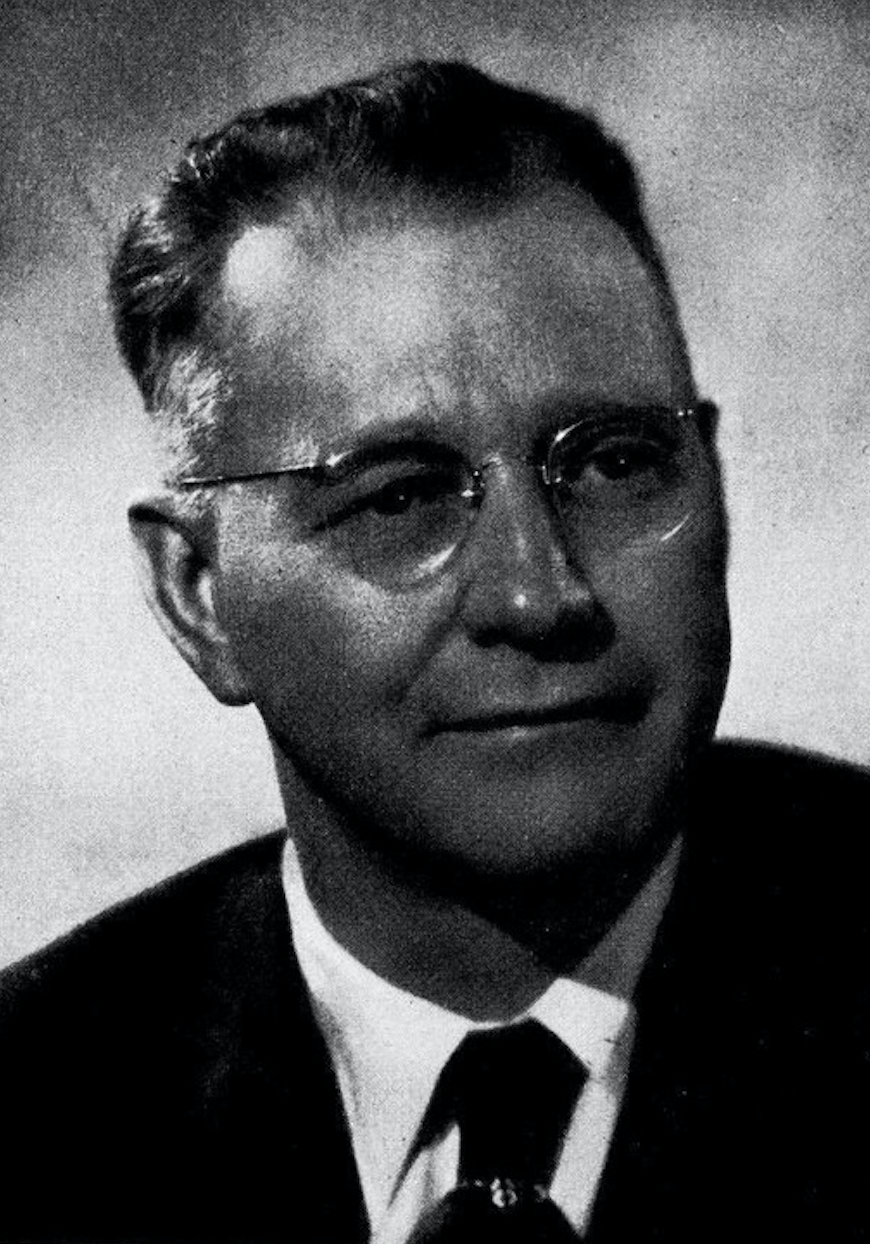

32nd Governor of Iowa
- In office November 21, 1954 – January 13, 1955
- Lieutenant: None
- Preceded by: William S. Beardsley
- Succeeded by: Leo Hoegh

33rd Lieutenant Governor of Iowa
- In office 1953–1957
- Governor: William S. Beardsley; Leo Hoegh
- Preceded by: William H. Nicholas
- Succeeded by: William H. Nicholas

Mayor of Fertile
- In office 1958–1963

Member of the Iowa Senate
- In office 1963–1965
- In office 1933–1953

Personal details
- Born: Leo Elthon; June 9, 1898 Fertile, Iowa, U.S.
- Died: April 16, 1967 (aged 68) Fertile, Iowa, U.S.
- Party: Republican
- Spouse: Synneva Hjelmeland (m. 1922; died 1963)
- Children: 6
- Education: Augsburg Seminary; Iowa State University; Hamilton College

Leo Hobson Elthon (June 9, 1898 – April 16, 1967) was the 32nd governor of Iowa from November 21, 1954 to January 13, 1955. Elthon had been elected the Lieutenant Governor of Iowa in November 1952, and filled the unexpired term of Governor William S. Beardsley, who died in office.

== Biography ==
Elthon was born in Fertile, Iowa in 1898, to Andrew Anderson Elthon and Olena Petrina (née Ouverson) Elthon. His father was born in Vang Municipality in Valdres, Norway. His mother's parents had emigrated from Norway as well.

Elthon attended the Augsburg Seminary at the Iowa State Teachers College, Iowa State University, and Hamilton College. He became a schoolteacher at Manual Training and Athletics in Clear Lake and school principal at Fertile High School in Fertile.

He married Synneva Hjelmeland on February 28, 1922 and had 6 children. Her father was Reverend Rasmus O. Hjelmeland who emigrated from Norway with his with wife Anne.

== Political career ==
=== Iowa Senate ===
He was first elected in the Iowa Senate in 1932 and served from 1933 to 1953, representing Howard County, Mitchell County and Worth County.

=== Lieutenant Governor and Governor ===
He was elected as lieutenant governor in 1952.

He assumed the Governorship upon the death of Governor Beardsley, in an automobile accident, in November 1954. He held the governorship until Governor-elect and then current Iowa Attorney General Leo Hoegh took office in January 1955. He is the only Iowa lieutenant governor to ascend to the office of governor upon the death of the previous governor.

In his less than 3 months in office, he commuted 17 life sentences, following a policy that Governor Beardsley would have enacted. He also delivered the State of the State address, asking for more money for unemployment insurance, schools, roads, workers compensation, unemployment insurance and workers compensation.

He then continued serving as Lieutenant Governor alongside Governor Hoegh until 1957.

=== Post-gubernatorial years ===
He then served as mayor of Fertile, Iowa, 1958 to 1963 and again in the state Senate, 1963 to 1965.

== Later life ==
Synneva died in 1963. In 1964, Elthon suffered a heart attack, worsening his health for the last 4 years of his life. Elthon died in 1967 in Mason City, Iowa of colon cancer and was interred at Brushpoint Cemetery in Fertile.

Party political offices
Preceded by William H. Nicholas	Republican Party nominee for Lieutenant Governor of Iowa; 1952, 1954	Succeeded by William H. Nicholas
Political offices
Preceded by William H. Nicholas	Lieutenant Governor of Iowa; 1953–1957	Succeeded by William H. Nicholas
Preceded by William S. Beardsley	Governor of Iowa; 1954–1955	Succeeded by Leo Hoegh
