= Harold Felton (politician) =

American politician (1890–1946)

Harold Felton (November 11, 1890 – December 7, 1946) was an American politician.

Harold Felton was born on November 11, 1890, to parents Z. T. and Sara Felton in New Virginia, Iowa. He married Velda Frederick on March 24, 1913. The couple raised five children, and lived in Indianola, where Harold ran a feed and grain manufacturing business.

Felton was a member of the Warren County Republican committee for ten years. In 1930, he was elected to the Iowa Republican Committee from District 7. Between 1931 and 1939, Felton was a member of Iowa's Board of Control of State Institutions. Felton won election to District 27 of the Iowa House of Representatives for the first time in 1940, and was reelected in 1942 and 1944. In his third, final, and only partial term as a state representative, Felton was elected house speaker. On December 7, 1946, Felton died in office of a heart attack, while in the lobby of the Hotel Fort Des Moines.
