= Robert D. Blue =

American politician (1898–1989)

Robert Donald Blue
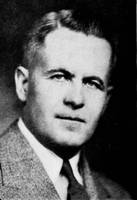

30th Governor of Iowa
- In office January 11, 1945 – January 13, 1949
- Lieutenant: Kenneth A. Evans
- Preceded by: Bourke B. Hickenlooper
- Succeeded by: William S. Beardsley

30th Lieutenant Governor of Iowa
- In office January 14, 1943 – January 11, 1945
- Governor: Bourke Hickenlooper
- Preceded by: Bourke Hickenlooper
- Succeeded by: Kenneth Evans

47th Speaker of the Iowa House of Representatives
- In office 1939–1943
- Preceded by: John R. Irwin
- Succeeded by: Henry W. Burma

Member of the Iowa House of Representatives from the 75th district
- In office January 14, 1935 – January 10, 1943
- Preceded by: R.E. Lee Aldrich
- Succeeded by: William Tyrrell

Personal details
- Born: September 24, 1898 Eagle Grove, Iowa, US
- Died: December 14, 1989 (aged 91) Fort Dodge, Iowa, US
- Party: Republican
- Spouse: Cathlene Beale (m. 1926)
- Children: 2
- Education: Iowa State University; Drake University
- Profession: Attorney

Robert Donald Blue (September 24, 1898 – December 14, 1989) was an American politician who served as the 30th governor of Iowa from 1945 to 1949.

== Early life ==
Blue was born in Eagle Grove, Iowa in 1898, to Donald Blue, railroad engineer, and Myrtle E. (née Newell), a schoolteacher.

Blue attended Capital City Commercial College and Iowa State University.

He served in the United States Army during World War I, being honorably discharged in 1919.

After the war, he earned a law degree from Drake University Law School in 1922. He practiced law in Eagle Grove.

He married Cathlene Beale on October 17, 1926 in Clarion and had a daughter, Barbara, and a son, Donald. Donald died in a gas explosion in 1973. He was a member of the United Methodist Church, and was inducted into the Methodist Hall of Fame because of his philanthropic efforts.

== Political career ==
=== Local politics ===
He was the Wright County Attorney from 1924 to 1931 and the Eagle Grove City Attorney from 1932 to 1934.

=== Iowa House ===
In 1934, Blue was elected to the Iowa House of Representatives. He was reelected in 1936, 1938, 1940, and 1942, and was Speaker of the Iowa House from 1939 to 1943.

=== Lieutenant Governor and Governor of Iowa ===
He was elected the Lieutenant Governor of Iowa in 1942 and then Governor in 1944, winning reelection in 1946.

Blue's policies were unpopular among labor groups (opposed to his bill outlawing the closed shop), farmers (opposed to his tax policies), and teachers (opposed to his cuts in education funding). He suggested making a state employee retirement plan. He was a champion of issues relating to the elderly.

One of his principal opponents in the legislature, William S. Beardsley, took advantage of Blue's unpopularity and successfully challenged him in the Republican primary in 1948.

== Legacy and later life ==
On September 24, 1988, celebrating Governor Blue's 90th birthday, the middle school in Eagle Grove changed its name to Robert Blue Middle School (RBMS) with Governor Blue was in attendance at the ceremony.

Governor Blue created the Iowa Centennial Memorial Foundation in 1949 by commemorating the 100th anniversary of Iowa's joining the Union in 1849. The scholarship fund was established "to encourage the youth of the state to attend Iowa's fine institutions of higher learning." The foundation renamed the scholarship to the Robert D. Blue Scholarship in 1990.

Blue left public life and returned to his hometown of Eagle Grove. He died of a stroke at Trinity Regional Hospital in Fort Dodge, Iowa on December 14, 1989. He was buried at the Rose Hill Cemetery in Eagle Grove. Cathlene died in 1990, aged 89, and was buried next to her husband.

Party political offices
Preceded by Bourke B. Hickenlooper	Republican nominee Governor of Iowa; 1944, 1946	Succeeded by William S. Beardsley
Political offices
Preceded by Bourke B. Hickenlooper	Lieutenant Governor of Iowa; 1943–1945	Succeeded by Kenneth A. Evans
Preceded by Bourke Hickenlooper	Governor of Iowa; 1945–1949	Succeeded by William S. Beardsley
Iowa House of Representatives
Preceded by John R. Irwin	47th Speaker; 1941–1943	Succeeded by Henry W. Burma
Preceded by R.E. Lee Aldrich	75th District; 1945–1949	Succeeded by William Tyrrell
