= 2018 Iowa Secretary of Agriculture election =

- November 6, 2018
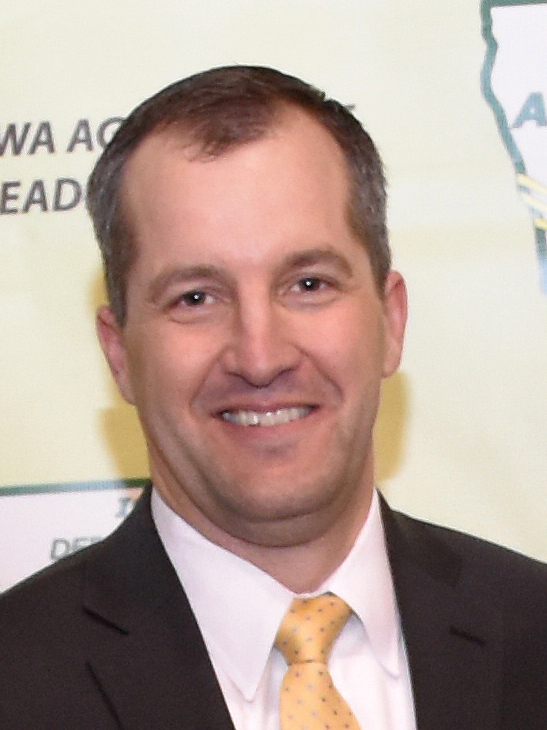

Candidate	Mike Naig	Tim Gannon
Party	Republican	Democratic
Popular vote	651,552	602,916
Percentage	50.35%	46.59%
- Naig: 40–50% 50–60% 60–70% 70–80% 80–90% Gannon: 40–50% 50–60% 60–70%
Secretary of Agriculture before election
Mike Naig
Republican
Elected Secretary of Agriculture
Mike Naig
Republican

The 2018 Iowa Secretary of Agriculture election was held on November 6, 2018, to elect the Secretary of Agriculture of Iowa, concurrently with elections to the United States House of Representatives, governor, and other state and local elections. Primary elections were held on June 5, 2018.

Incumbent Republican secretary Bill Northey resigned in March 2018 after his confirmation by the United States Senate as the Under Secretary of Agriculture for Farm Production and Conservation. Mike Naig was appointed to the seat after Northey's resignation by Governor Kim Reynolds. Naig won a full term against Democratic nominee Tim Gannon in the general election.

== Republican primary ==
As no candidate received over 35% of the vote, the Iowa Republican Party was required to hold a convention to choose a nominee. Mike Naig was chosen as the nominee and had received just shy of the 35% of the vote needed in the primary.

=== Candidates ===
==== Nominee ====
- Mike Naig, acting Secretary of Agriculture of Iowa (2018–present) and former deputy secretary of agriculture (2013–2018)

==== Defeated ====
- Chad Ingels, farmer and former member of the Iowa Environmental Protection Commission
- Ray Gaesser, farmer and former chairman of the American Soybean Association
- Craig Lang, former president of the Iowa Farm Bureau
- Dan Zumbach, state senator from the 48th district (2013–present)

==== Declined ====
- Pat Grassley, state representative from the 50th district (2013–present), 17th district (2007–2013), and grandson of Chuck Grassley (ran for re-election)

=== Endorsements ===
Mike Naig

Statewide officials

- Bill Northey, United States Under Secretary of Agriculture for Farm Production and Conservation (2018-2021) and Secretary of Agriculture of Iowa (2007-2018)
Pat Grassley (declined)

U.S. senators

- Chuck Grassley, U.S. Senator from Iowa (1981-present), member of the United States House of Representatives from IA-3 (1975-1981), and former state representative (1959-1975) (candidate's grandfather)

=== Results ===
Republican primary results
Party	Candidate	Votes	%
Republican	Mike Naig (incumbent)	30,870	34.73%
Republican	Dan Zumbach	18,938	21.31%
Republican	Craig Lang	16,514	18.58%
Republican	Ray Gaesser	14,437	16.24%
Republican	Chad Ingels	7,915	8.90%
Write-in		210	0.24%
Rejected ballots		16,299	15.50%
Total votes		88,884	100.0%

== Democratic primary ==
=== Candidates ===
==== Nominee ====
- Tim Gannon, Jasper County farmer and former United States Department of Agriculture official

=== Results ===
Democratic primary results
Party	Candidate	Votes	%
Democratic	Tim Gannon	148,258	99.52%
Write-in		710	0.48%
Rejected ballots		33,768	18.48%
Total votes		148,968	100.0%

== General election ==
=== Post-primary endorsements ===
Mike Naig (R)

Organizations

- Iowa Association of Business and Industry
- Iowa Corn Growers Association
- Iowa Farm Bureau
Tim Gannon (D)

U.S. presidents

- Barack Obama, President of the United States (2009-2017) and U.S. Senator from Illinois (2005-2008)

=== Results ===
2018 Iowa Secretary of Agriculture election
Party	Candidate	Votes	%
Republican	Mike Naig (incumbent)	651,552	50.35%
Democratic	Tim Gannon	602,916	46.59%
Libertarian	Rick Stewart	38,965	3.01%
Write-in		597	0.05%
Total votes		1,294,030	100.00%
Republican hold			

==== By congressional district ====
Despite losing the state, Gannon won three of four congressional districts.

District	Naig	Gannon	Representative
1st	48%	49%	Rod Blum (115th Congress)
1st	48%	49%	Abby Finkenauer (116th Congress)
2nd	47%	50%	Dave Loebsack
3rd	48%	49%	David Young (115th Congress)
3rd	48%	49%	Cindy Axne (116th Congress)
4th	60%	37%	Steve King
