= Bloody Run =

Bloody Run may refer to:

== Places ==
- Bloody Run (Iowa), a tributary of the Mississippi River, flowing through Clayton County, Iowa, United States
- Bloody Run (Raystown Branch Juniata River), a tributary of the Raystown Branch Juniata River in Bedford County, Pennsylvania, United States
- Bloody Run (Wisconsin), a tributary to Nepco Lake
- Bloody Run Hills, a mountain range in Humboldt County, Nevada, United States
- Everett, Pennsylvania, a borough in Bedford County, Pennsylvania, originally known as Bloody Run

== Battles ==
- Battle of Bloody Run, the name ascribed to a July 1763 battle, part of the conflict known as Pontiac's War (alternatively as Pontiac's Rebellion), fought near Fort Detroit (Present day Detroit Michigan's Near-East Side)
- Battle of Bloody Run (1656), a battle fought in March or April 1656 near Richmond, Virginia.

== Other ==
- Bloody Run Canoe Classic, a community canoe and kayak race along the Raystown Branch of the Juniata River in Everett, Pennsylvania, United States
