= 2018 Iowa State Treasurer election =

- November 6, 2018
- Registered: 2,167,914
- Turnout: 61.55%
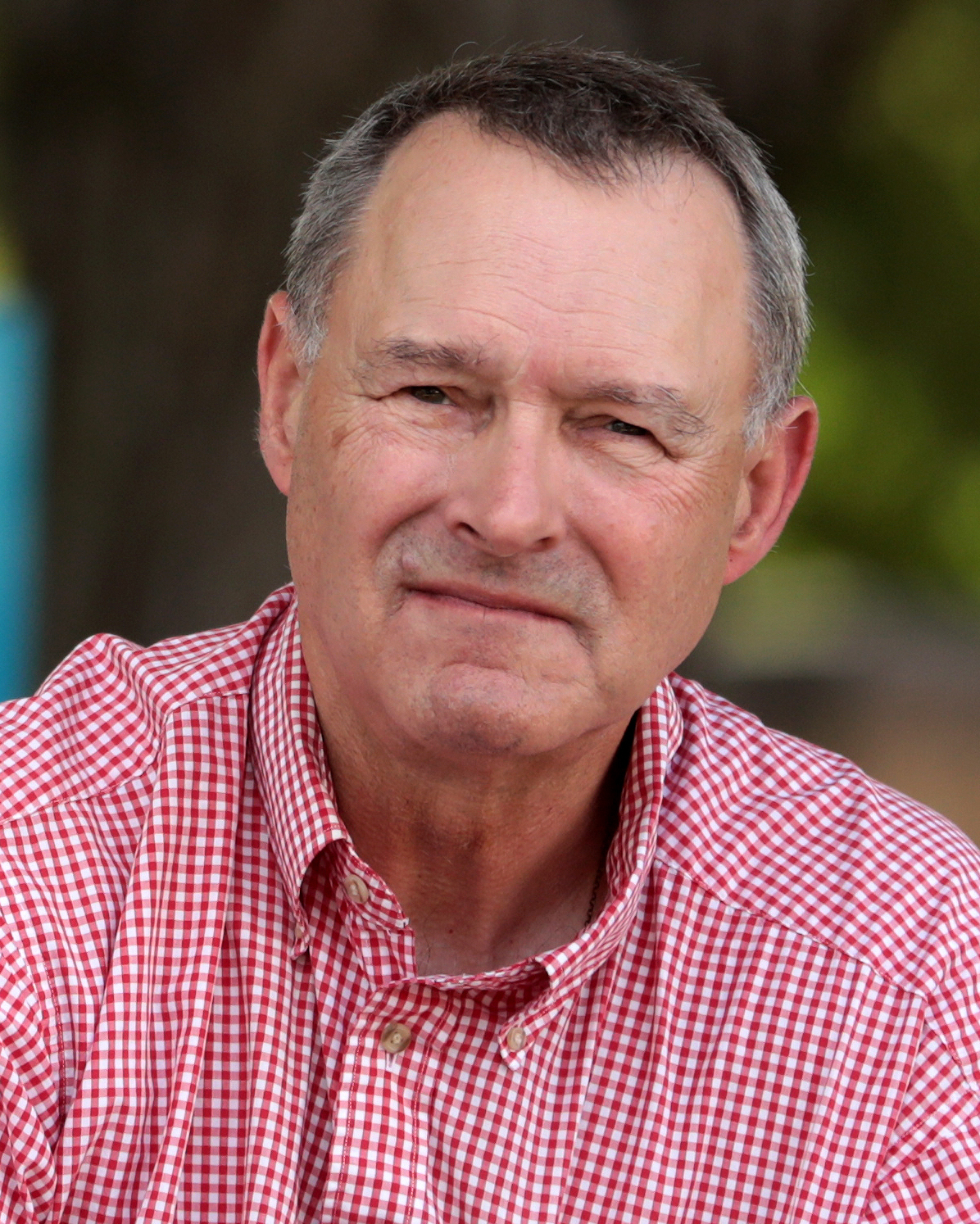

Candidate	Michael Fitzgerald	Jeremy Davis
Party	Democratic	Republican
Popular vote	710,426	553,691
Percentage	54.82%	42.73%
- Fitzgerald: 40–50% 50–60% 60–70% 70–80% 80–90% >90% Davis: 40–50% 50–60% 60–70% 70–80% 80–90% >90% Tie: 40–50%
Treasurer before election
Michael Fitzgerald
Democratic
Elected Treasurer
Michael Fitzgerald
Democratic

The 2018 Iowa State Treasurer election was held on November 6, 2018, to elect the Treasurer of Iowa, concurrently with elections to the United States House of Representatives, governor, and other state and local elections. Primary elections were held on June 5, 2018.

Incumbent Democratic treasurer Michael Fitzgerald comfortably won re-election to a tenth term in office against Republican nominee Jeremy Davis. Fitzgerald continued his tenure as the longest serving state treasurer in the United States following his re-election.

== Democratic primary ==
=== Candidates ===
==== Nominee ====
- Michael Fitzgerald, incumbent state treasurer (1983-present)

=== Results ===
Democratic primary results
Party	Candidate	Votes	%
Democratic	Michael Fitzgerald (incumbent)	156,225	99.72%
Write-in		444	0.28%
Total votes		156,669	100.00%

== Republican primary ==
The Republican nominee, Jeremy Davis, was not a candidate on the primary ballot in 2018.

=== Candidates ===
==== Nominee ====
- Jeremy Davis, National Pork Producers Council employee and nominee for state senate in 2014

==== Withdrawn ====
- John Thompson, former U.S. Army captain and Iowa Republican Party official

== General election ==
=== Results ===
2018 Iowa State Treasurer election
Party	Candidate	Votes	%
Democratic	Michael Fitzgerald (incumbent)	710,426	54.82%
Republican	Jeremy Davis	553,691	42.73%
Libertarian	Timothy Hird	31,268	2.41%
Write-in		465	0.04%
Total votes		1,295,850	100.00%
Democratic hold			

==== By congressional district ====
Fitzgerald won three of four congressional districts.

District	Fitzgerald	Davis	Representative
1st	57%	40%	Rod Blum (115th Congress)
1st	57%	40%	Abby Finkenauer (116th Congress)
2nd	56%	42%	Dave Loebsack
3rd	58%	39%	David Young (115th Congress)
3rd	58%	39%	Cindy Axne (116th Congress)
4th	48%	50%	Steve King
