= 2026 Iowa State Treasurer election =

2026 Iowa Treasurer of State election
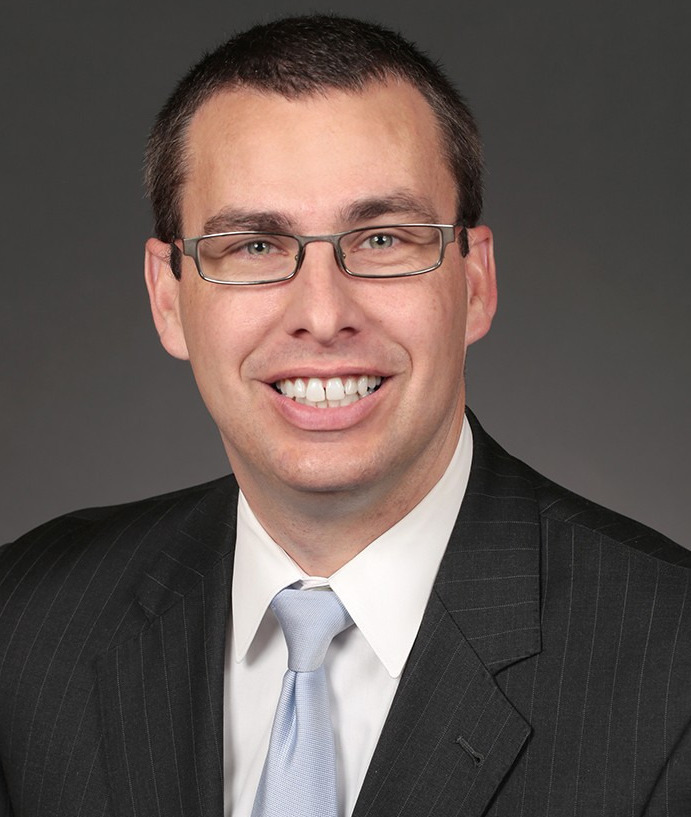

Nominee	Roby Smith	John Norwood
Party	Republican	Democratic
Popular vote	664,948	655,768
Percentage	50.3%	49.7%
- Smith: 50–60% 60–70% 70–80% 80–90% Norwood: 50–60% 60–70% 70–80%
State Treasurer before election
Roby Smith
Republican
Elected State Treasurer
Roby Smith
Republican

The 2026 Iowa State Treasurer election was held on November 3, 2026, to elect the Treasurer of Iowa, concurrently with elections to the United States Senate, U.S. House of Representatives, governor, and other state and local elections. Primary elections were held on June 2, 2026.

== Republican primary ==
=== Candidates ===
==== Nominee ====
- Roby Smith, incumbent state treasurer (2023–present)

=== Results ===
Republican primary results
Party	Candidate	Votes	%
Republican	Roby Smith (incumbent)	175,007	99.5
Write-in		849	0.5
Total votes		175,856	100.0

== Democratic primary ==
=== Candidates ===
==== Nominee ====
- John Norwood, former Polk County soil and water commissioner and nominee for secretary of agriculture in 2022

=== Results ===
Democratic primary results
Party	Candidate	Votes	%
Democratic	John Norwood	176,032	99.8
Write-in		340	0.2
Total votes		176,372	100.0

== General election ==
=== Post-primary endorsements ===
Roby Smith (R)

Organizations

- National Federation of Independent Business

=== Results ===
2026 Iowa State Treasurer election results
Party	Candidate	Votes	%	±%
Republican	Roby Smith (incumbent)	664,948	50.35	−0.95
Democratic	John Norwood	655,768	49.65	+0.95
Total votes		1,320,716	100.00	
