= Mike Naig =

American politician

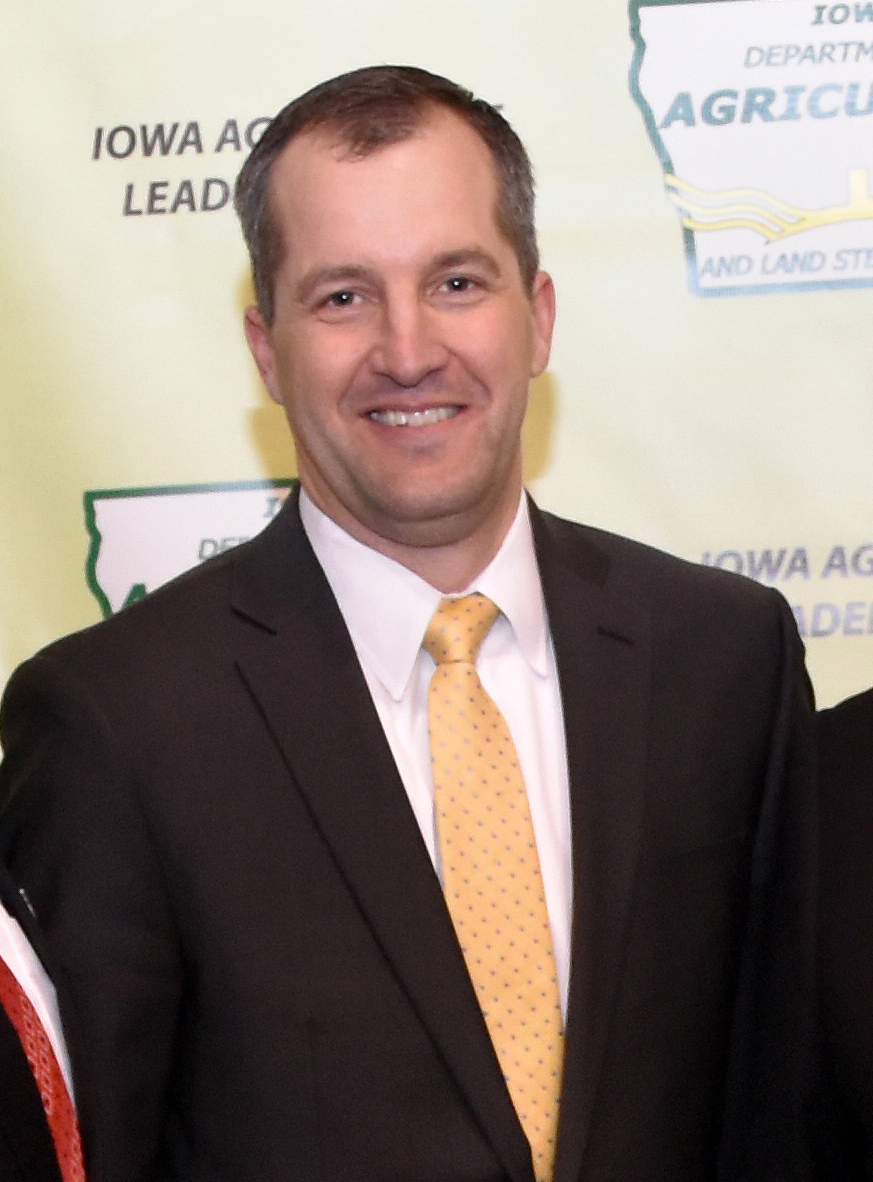
- Naig in 2018

15th Secretary of Agriculture of Iowa
- Incumbent
- Assumed office March 5, 2018
- Governor: Kim Reynolds; Rob Sand (elect)
- Deputy: Julie Kenney; Grant Menke
- Preceded by: Bill Northey

Deputy Secretary of Agriculture of Iowa for Agriculture and Land Stewardship
- In office September 4, 2013 – March 5, 2018
- Governor: Terry Branstad; Kim Reynolds
- Preceded by: Jay Johnson
- Succeeded by: Julie Kenney

Personal details
- Born: March 2, 1978 (age 48)
- Party: Republican
- Spouse: Jamie
- Children: 3
- Education: Buena Vista University (BA)

Mike Naig (born March 2, 1978) is an American politician in the state of Iowa. A Republican, he is the current Iowa secretary of agriculture. He became the deputy secretary of agriculture in September 2013. After the resignation of Bill Northey, Kim Reynolds appointed Naig to succeed him in March 2018.

== Early life ==
Naig was born on March 2, 1978. He grew up on a family farm near Cylinder, Iowa. He graduated from Emmetsburg High School in 1996 and attended Buena Vista University, graduating in 2000 with a bachelor's degree in biology and political science.

== Political career ==
Naig spent 13 years working in the agriculture industry, serving in various trade organizations. In September 2013, he became the deputy secretary of agriculture for the state of Iowa, serving under then-Iowa agriculture secretary Bill Northey. He served in this role until March 2018, when Northey was appointed Under Secretary for Farm Production and Conservation at the United States Department of Agriculture, at which point governor Kim Reynolds appointed Naig as Iowa secretary of agriculture to fill the vacancy left by Northey.

Naig won election to a full term as Iowa secretary of agriculture in November 2018, defeating Democratic challenger Tim Gannon 50% to 47%. During the primary, he received 34.7 percent of the vote, beating fellow Republican Dan Zumbach but not receiving enough votes to automatically secure the party's nomination. In the election, Naig received the backing of the Farm Bureau as well as companies like John Deere and Monsanto.

In the 2022 election, Naig ran for reelection against Democrat John Norwood. He has often spoken in favor of biofuels to combat climate change, rather than switching to electric vehicles. Naig defeated Norwood.

In the 2026 election, Naig ran unopposed in the Republican primary, winning 183,112 votes. Naig is running against Chris Jones, an author and water quality advocate, in the general election.

== Personal life ==
Naig and his wife, Jaime, have three sons.

== Electoral history ==
2026 Iowa Secretary of Agriculture Republican Primary
Party	Candidate	Votes	%
Republican	Mike Naig (incumbent)	183,112	99.46
Write-in		894	0.54
Total votes		217,155	100.00

2022 Iowa Secretary of Agriculture General Election
Party	Candidate	Votes	%
Republican	Mike Naig (incumbent)	730,285	61.13%
Democratic	John Norwood	463,652	38.81%
Write-in		770	0.06%
Total votes		1,194,707	100.00%
Republican hold			

2018 Iowa Secretary of Agriculture General Election
Party	Candidate	Votes	%
Republican	Mike Naig (incumbent)	651,552	50.3%
Democratic	Tim Gannon	602,916	46.6%
Libertarian	Rick Stewart	38,965	3.0%
Write-in		597	0.1%
Total votes		1,294,030	100.0%
Republican hold			

Political offices
Preceded by Bill Northey	Secretary of Agriculture of Iowa; 2018–present	Incumbent
Party political offices
Preceded by Bill Northey	Republican nominee for Secretary of Agriculture of Iowa; 2018, 2022, 2026	Most recent
