= Dale M. Cochran =

American politician (1928–2018)

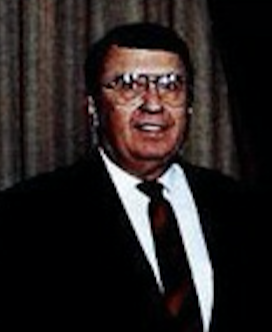

12th Iowa Secretary of Agriculture
- In office 1987 – January 15, 1999
- Governor: Terry Branstad
- Preceded by: Robert H. Lounsberry
- Succeeded by: Patty Judge

Member of the Iowa House of Representatives
- In office 1965–1987

Personal details
- Born: David Melvin Cochran; November 20, 1928 Fort Dodge, Iowa, U.S.
- Died: August 27, 2018 (aged 89) West Des Moines, Iowa, U.S.
- Party: Democratic
- Spouse: Rose Jeannene Hirsch (m. 1952)
- Relations: John Forbes (son-in-law) Ashton Lambie (2nd cousin, 3x removed)
- Children: 3
- Occupation: Farmer

Dale M. Cochran (November 20, 1928 – August 27, 2018) was an American politician from the state of Iowa.

== Career ==
Dale Melvin Cochran was born at 820 N 15th St in Fort Dodge, Iowa on 20 November 1928. His mother, Gladys Sophia Fibiker, was born to Iowans of Czech ancestry. Gladys' grandparents were born in Česká Třebová, Tisová, Sokoleč, and Nová Ves I respectively.

Cochran attended Iowa State University, where he earned a Bachelor of Science degree, and is a former farmer. In June 1952, he married in Ankeny to Rose Jeannene Hirsch (1930-2021), and has three children. His daughter, Cindy, married Rep. John Forbes.

Cochran served as a Democrat in the Iowa House of Representatives from 1965 to 1987. He served district 62 from 1965 to 1973, district 45 from 1973 to 1983, and district 14 from 1983 to 1987. He was Minority Floor Leader from 1971 to 1974, Assistant Minority Leader from 1981 to 1982, Chairman of the House Agriculture Committee from 1983 to 1984, and Speaker of the House from 1975 to 1978. From 1987 to 1998, he served as the Iowa Secretary of Agriculture. He died in 2018 at the age of 89. He was interred at North Lawn Cemetery.

Party political offices
Preceded by Jim R. Riordan	Democratic nominee for Secretary of Agriculture of Iowa; 1986, 1990, 1994	Succeeded by Patty Judge
