= 2022 Iowa State Treasurer election =

- November 8, 2022
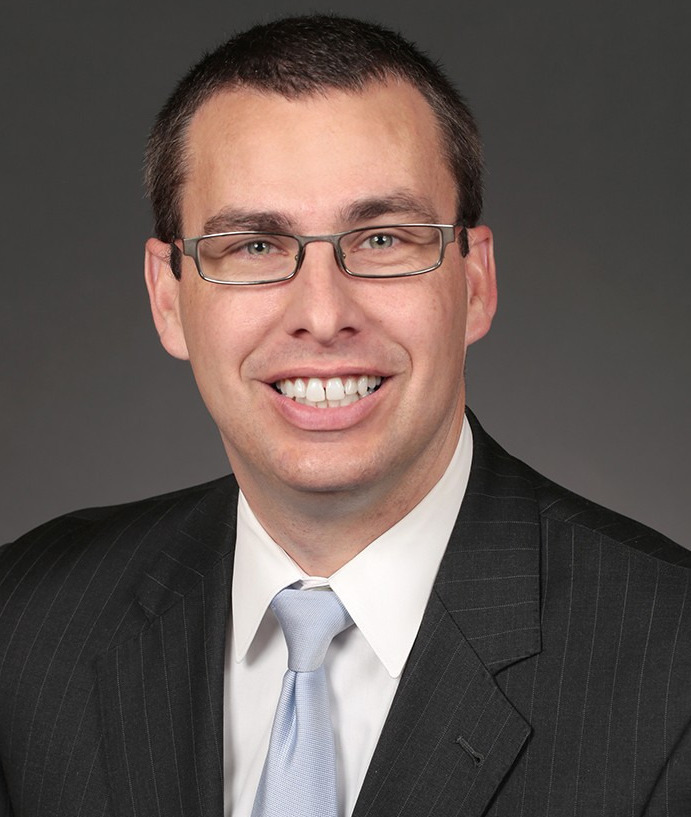

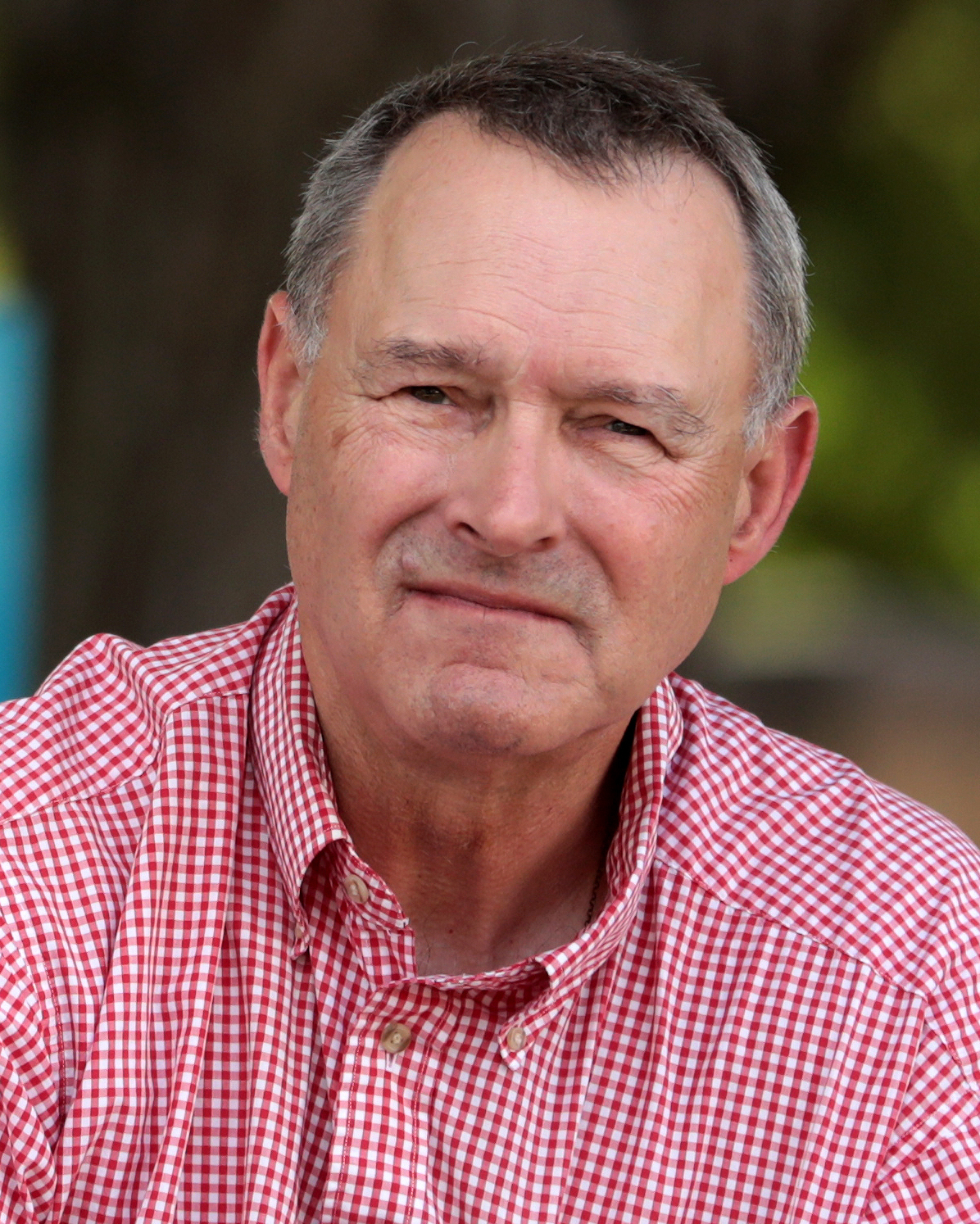
Nominee	Roby Smith	Michael Fitzgerald
Party	Republican	Democratic
Popular vote	614,943	584,021
Percentage	51.26%	48.68%
- Smith: 40–50% 50–60% 60–70% 70–80% 80–90% Fitzgerald: 40–50% 50–60% 60–70% 70–80%
State Treasurer before election
Michael Fitzgerald
Democratic
Elected State Treasurer
Roby Smith
Republican

The 2022 Iowa State Treasurer election was held on November 8, 2022, to elect the Treasurer of Iowa, concurrently with an election to the U.S. Senate, governor, U.S. House of Representatives, and other state and local elections. Primary elections were held on June 7, 2022, though both major party candidates only received token write-in opposition. A debate was held on October 7, 2022.

Incumbent Democratic treasurer Michael Fitzgerald ran for re-election to an eleventh term in office, but was defeated by Republican state senator Roby Smith. Fitzgerald was one of two statewide elected Democrats to lose re-election in 2022, along with Attorney General Tom Miller.

== Democratic primary ==
=== Candidates ===
==== Nominee ====
- Michael Fitzgerald, incumbent state treasurer since 1983

=== Results ===
Democratic primary results
Party	Candidate	Votes	%
Democratic	Michael Fitzgerald (incumbent)	145,929	99.84%
Write-in		235	0.16%
Total votes		146,164	100.0%

== Republican primary ==
=== Candidates ===
==== Nominee ====
- Roby Smith, state senator from the 47th district since 2011

=== Results ===
Republican primary results
Party	Candidate	Votes	%
Republican	Roby Smith	164,191	99.63%
Write-in		603	0.37%
Total votes		164,794	100.0%

== General election ==
=== Results ===
2022 Iowa State Treasurer election
Party	Candidate	Votes	%
Republican	Roby Smith	614,943	51.26%
Democratic	Michael Fitzgerald (incumbent)	584,021	48.68%
Write-in		667	0.06%
Total votes		1,199,631	100.00%
Republican gain from Democratic			

==== Counties that flipped from Democratic to Republican ====
Smith won 31 counties that had previously voted for Fitzgerald in 2018.

- Adair (largest city: Greenfield)
- Audubon (largest city: Audubon)
- Boone (largest city: Boone)
- Bremer (largest city: Waverly)
- Buchanan (largest city: Independence)
- Buena Vista (largest city: Storm Lake)
- Carroll (largest city: Carroll)
- Cedar (largest city: Tipton)
- Chickasaw (largest city: New Hampton)
- Clayton (largest city: Guttenberg)
- Clinton (largest city: Clinton)
- Des Moines (largest city: Burlington)
- Floyd (largest city: Charles City)
- Fayette (largest city: Oelwein)
- Greene (largest city: Jefferson)
- Hamilton (largest city: Webster City)
- Howard (largest city: Cresco)
- Jackson (largest city: Maquoketa)
- Jasper (largest city: Newton)
- Jones (largest city: Anamosa)
- Lee (largest city: Fort Madison)
- Marshall (largest city: Marshalltown)
- Mitchell (largest city: Osage)
- Muscatine (largest city: Muscatine)
- Poweshiek (largest city: Grinnell)
- Scott (largest city: Davenport)
- Tama (largest city: Tama)
- Wapello (largest city: Ottumwa)
- Warren (largest city: Indianola)
- Webster (largest city: Fort Dodge)
- Woodbury (largest city: Sioux City)
- Worth (largest city: Northwood)

==== By congressional district ====
Smith won three of four congressional districts, with the remaining one going to Fitzgerald, which elected a Republican.

District	Fitzgerald	Smith	Representative
1st	49.6%	50.4%	Mariannette Miller-Meeks
2nd	49.97%	49.99%	Ashley Hinson
3rd	55%	45%	Cindy Axne (117th Congress)
3rd	55%	45%	Zach Nunn (118th Congress)
4th	39%	61%	Randy Feenstra

== See also ==
- 2022 Iowa elections
- Treasurer of Iowa
