= 2026 Iowa Secretary of Agriculture election =

- November 3, 2026
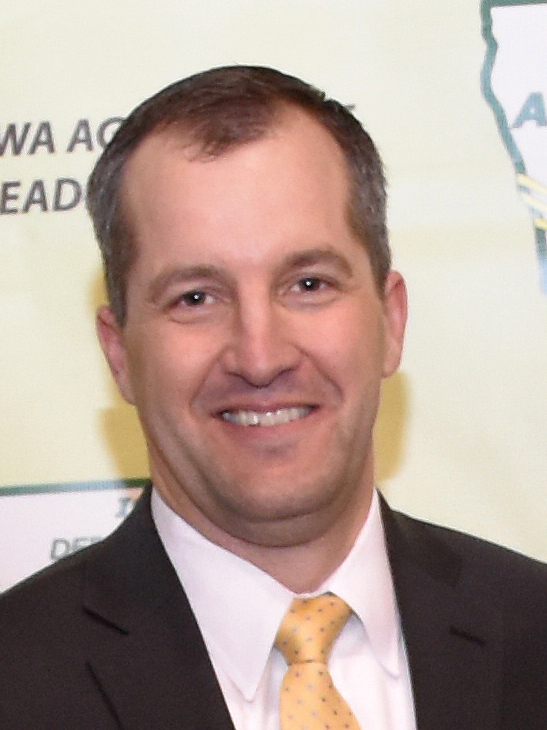

Candidate	Mike Naig	Chris Jones
Party	Republican	Democratic
Popular vote	701,883	629,249
Percentage	52.7%	47.3%
- Naig: 50–60% 60–70% 70–80% 80–90% Jones: 50–60% 70–80%
Secretary of Agriculture before election
Mike Naig
Republican
Elected Secretary of Agriculture
Mike Naig
Republican

The 2026 Iowa Secretary of Agriculture election was held on November 3, 2026, to elect the Secretary of Agriculture of Iowa. Primary elections were held on June 2. Incumbent Republican secretary Mike Naig was re-elected to a third term, defeating Democratic challenger Chris Jones.

Naig ran unopposed in the Republican primary. In the Democratic primary, Jones initially faced a challenge from Wade Dooley; who later withdrew his campaign.

== Republican primary ==
=== Candidates ===
==== Nominee ====
- Mike Naig, incumbent secretary of agriculture

=== Results ===
Republican primary results
Party	Candidate	Votes	%
Republican	Mike Naig (incumbent)	183,135	99.5
Write-in		1,002	0.5
Total votes		184,137	100.0

== Democratic primary ==
=== Candidates ===
==== Nominee ====
- Chris Jones, author and water quality advocate

==== Withdrawn ====
- Wade Dooley, farmer

=== Results ===
Democratic primary results
Party	Candidate	Votes	%
Democratic	Chris Jones	176,017	99.7
Write-in		534	0.3
Total votes		176,551	100.0

== General election ==
=== Post-primary endorsements ===
Mike Naig (R)

Organizations

- Iowa Farm Bureau
Chris Jones (D)

U.S. senators

- Tom Harkin, former Iowa (1985–2015)
- Bernie Sanders, Vermont (2007–present) (Independent)

=== Polling ===
Poll source	Date(s) administered	Sample size (Note: Key: A – all adults RV – registered voters LV – likely voters V – unclear)	Margin of error	Mike Naig (R)	Chris Jones (D)	Undecided
Cygnal (R) (Note: Poll sponsored by the Iowans for Tax Relief Foundation)	September 9–11, 2026	500 (LV)	± 4.4%	43%	36%	21%
Change Research (D) (Note: Poll sponsored by Jones' campaign)	July 28 – August 1, 2026	1,071 (LV)	± 3.1%	42%	40%	18%

=== Results ===
2026 Iowa Secretary of Agriculture election
Party	Candidate	Votes	%	±%
Republican	Mike Naig (incumbent)	701,883	52.7%	−8.4%
Democratic	Chris Jones	629,249	47.3%	+8.5%
Write-in		1,331,132	100.0	
Total votes			100.0	
