= Wooden (disambiguation) =

To be wooden is to be made of the hard, fibrous, lignified structural tissue produced as secondary xylem in the stems of woody plants.

Wooden may also refer to:

== People ==
- Charles Wooden (1827–1875), German recipient of the Victoria Cross
- Colby Wooden (born 2000), American football player
- John Wooden (1910–2010), American college basketball coach
- Josh Wooden (born 1978), Australian rules footballer
- Sam Wooden, American politician
- Shawn Wooden (American football) (born 1973), American football safety
- Shawn Wooden (politician), American politician
- Stephen Wooden, American politician

== Other uses ==
- 17241 Wooden, a main-belt asteroid
- Wooden language, a diverting of attention from reality by using certain words
- "Wooden", a song by Simian Mobile Disco from Attack Decay Sustain Release
