= Willis Bagley =

American politician (1873–1943)

20th Treasurer of Iowa
- In office 1939 – October 20, 1943
- Governor: George A. Wilson
- Preceded by: Leo Wegman
- Succeeded by: John M. Grimes

Personal details
- Born: Willis Gaylord Clark Bagley; October 29, 1873 Magnolia, Wisconsin, U.S.
- Died: October 20, 1943 (aged 69) Des Moines, Iowa, U.S.
- Resting place: Elmwood-St. Joseph Municipal Cemetery, Mason City, Iowa, U.S.
- Party: Republican
- Spouse: Winifred Bogardus (m. 1895; died 1967)
- Children: 2
- Parent(s): Shepherd Stephen Bagley; Louisa Cain
- Profession: Politician, banker

Willis Gaylord Clark Bagley (October 29, 1873 – October 20, 1943), also known as Willis G. C. Bagley and W. G. C. Bagley, was an American politician and banker who served as the 20th Treasurer of Iowa from 1939 to 1943.

== Early life and education ==
Bagley was born in Magnolia, Wisconsin on October 29, 1873. He was one of six children born to Shepherd Stephen Bagley and Louisa Cain. His father was a grocer who also owned a marble business. Bagley received his education in Mason City, Iowa, having moved there with his family when he was about four years old.

== Career ==
After graduating from high school in 1891, Bagley became president of Iowa's First National Bank, elected in 1908.

Bagley achieved notoriety following a robbery perpetrated by the Dillinger Gang on March 13, 1934, when Bagley was serving as the bank's president. Bagley was talking to a customer while sitting at his desk near the front door when he was approached by Homer Van Meter, who was armed. Bagley ran for cover in his office; Van Meter fired several bullets through the door in an attempt to force his way inside, though he gave up and stormed through the lobby instead. The gang escaped with roughly $52,000.

A Republican, Bagley served as the 20th Treasurer of Iowa from 1939 until his death in office in 1943.

Bagley was succeeded by fellow Republican John M. Grimes.

== Personal life and death ==
Bagley was a member of the Freemasons, the Shriners, The Elks, and the Odd Fellows, as well as the American Bankers Association. Bagley's service in his community resulted in an inclusion in Who's Who in America.

On May 15, 1895, Bagley married Winifred Bogardus, with whom he had two children. Both Bagley and his wife were members of the Methodist Episcopal Church; the former was also the church's treasurer.

Bagley died at the age of 69 in Des Moines, Iowa on October 20, 1943. He was interred at Elmwood-St. Joseph Municipal Cemetery in Mason City. Bogardus, who died on May 11, 1967, was interred at the same cemetery.

Political offices
Preceded by Leo J. Wegman	20th Treasurer of Iowa; 1939–1943	Succeeded by John M. Grimes
