= Lindsay James (politician) =

American politician (born 1980)

The Reverend Lindsay James
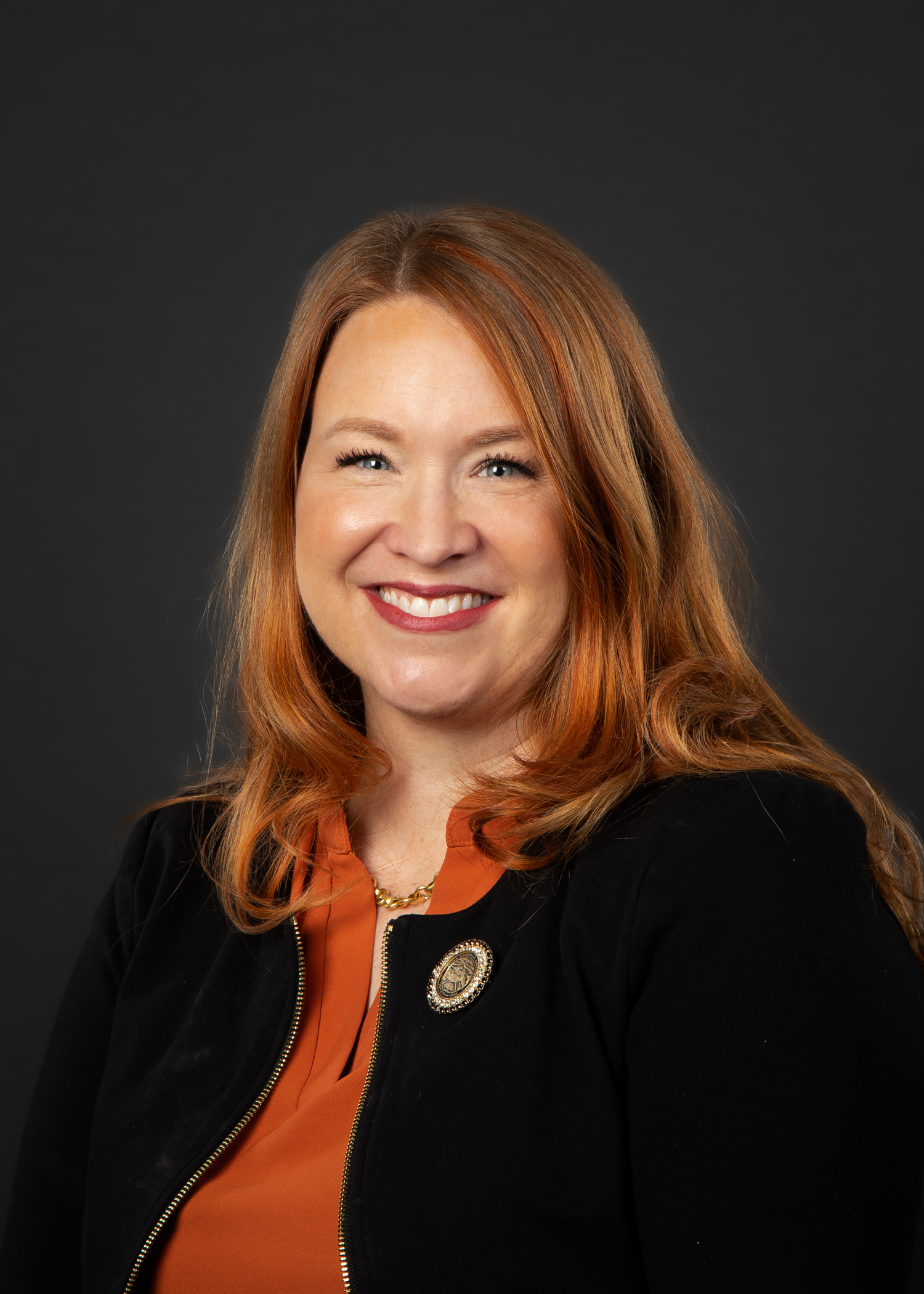
- Official portrait, 2023

Member-elect of the U.S. House of Representatives from Iowa's 2nd district
- Assuming office January 3, 2027
- Succeeding: Ashley Hinson

Member of the Iowa House of Representatives
- Incumbent
- Assumed office January 14, 2019
- Preceded by: Abby Finkenauer
- Succeeded by: Sam Wooden (elect)
- Constituency: 99th district (2019–2023); 71st district (2023–present)

Personal details
- Born: Lindsay Beals; October 10, 1980 (age 46) Portland, Oregon, U.S.
- Party: Democratic
- Spouse: Christopher James
- Children: 2
- Education: Santa Clara University (BA); Fuller Theological Seminary (MDiv)
- Website: State House website Campaign website

Lindsay James (née Beals, born October 10, 1980) is an American politician and Presbyterian minister who is the U.S. representative-elect for Iowa's 2nd congressional district. A member of the Democratic Party, she also is serving as a member of the Iowa House of Representatives from the 71st district since 2019, representing part of Dubuque County and serving as House minority whip.

== Early life and education ==
Born in Portland, Oregon, James graduated from West Linn High School in 1999. She obtained a degree in communications from Santa Clara University in 2003 and earned a Masters of Divinity from Fuller Theological Seminary in 2007.

== Ministry career ==
James was a minister for Menlo Park Presbyterian Church from 2007 to 2010, an interfaith chaplain for Endicott College from 2012 to 2015, and an associate pastor for Westminster Presbyterian Church from 2016 to 2017. Starting in 2015, she worked as an adjunct professor at the University of Dubuque. In 2017, James co-founded and served as director of the Loras College Peace Institute.

== Iowa House of Representatives ==
In 2018, James was elected to the Iowa House of Representatives for the 99th district, where incumbent Democrat Abby Finkenauer retired to successfully run for the U.S. House. She faced Brad Cavanagh and Pat Cullen in the Democratic primary election. She defeated Republican nominee Pauline Chilton in the general election with 60% of the vote.

In 2020, James again faced Republican nominee Pauline Chilton and won re-election with 56.6% of the vote. Following redistricting, James was redrawn into the 71st district and re-elected in 2022. She won a fourth term in 2024, defeating Republican nominee James McClain with 56.1% of the vote.

In 2022, she was elected to the House's Democratic leadership team as Minority Whip. In 2026, she sponsored legislation applicable to mobile homes that would limit rent increases and place restrictions on the termination of rental agreements.

In the Iowa House, James serves on the Environmental Protection Committee. She previously served on the Education, Human Resources, and Ways and Means committees, and was ranking member of the Government Oversight and Judiciary committees.

== 2026 U.S. House of Representatives campaign ==
On August 19, 2025, James announced her campaign for Iowa's 2nd congressional district against incumbent Republican Ashley Hinson in the 2026 United States House of Representatives elections. James said that she would focus on health care and housing costs, Iowa's growing cancer rate, and economic issues. Hinson subsequently declared her candidacy for the U.S. Senate seat being vacated by retiring Republican Senator Joni Ernst; in her place, Republicans nominated former Iowa House representative Joe Mitchell. On November 3, 2026, James defeated Mitchell, flipping the seat from Republican to Democrat.

== Electoral history ==
Election	Political result	Candidate	Party	Votes	%
Iowa House of Representatives elections, 2018; District 99; Turnout: 14,054	Democratic hold	Lindsay James	Democratic	8,476	60.31
Iowa House of Representatives elections, 2018; District 99; Turnout: 14,054	Democratic hold	Pauline Chilton	Republican	5,564	39.59

== Personal life ==
James lives in Dubuque, Iowa, with her husband, Christopher, and their two children.

U.S. House of Representatives
Preceded by Ashley Hinson	Member of the U.S. House of Representatives from Iowa's 2nd congressional district Taking office 2027	Elect
