= Roby Smith =

American politician and legislator

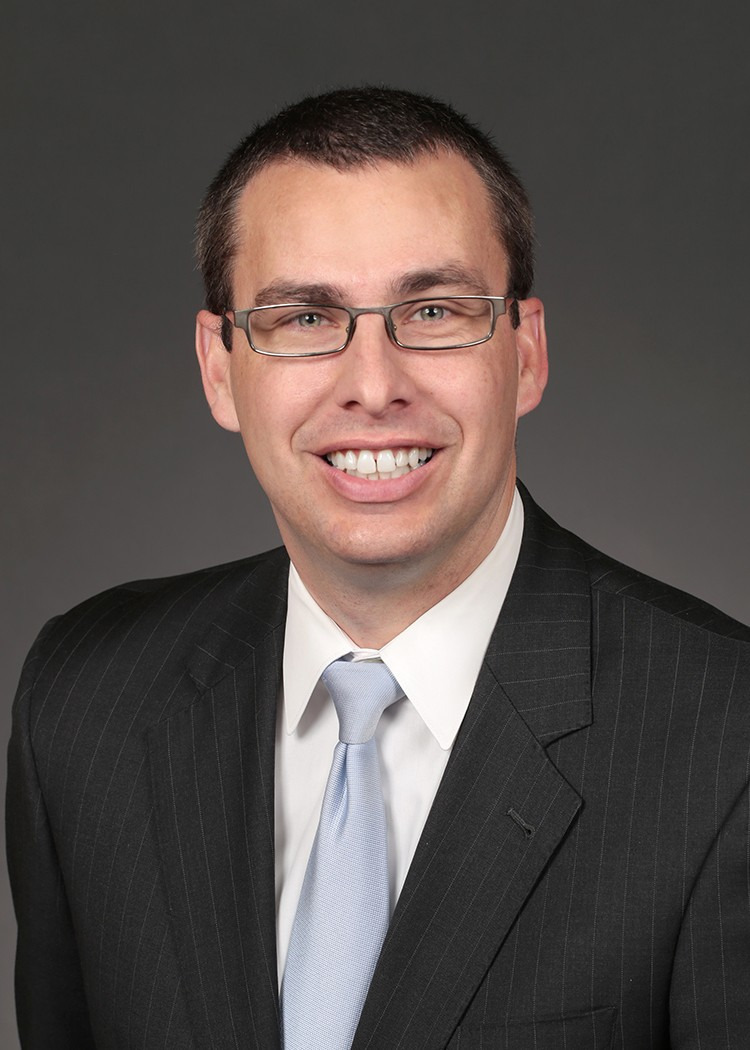
- Official portrait, 2021

26th Treasurer of Iowa
- Incumbent
- Assumed office January 1, 2023
- Governor: Kim Reynolds; Rob Sand (elect)
- Preceded by: Michael Fitzgerald

Member of the Iowa Senate from the 47th district
- In office January 10, 2011 – January 1, 2023
- Preceded by: Mark Chelgren
- Succeeded by: Scott Webster

Personal details
- Born: 1977 (age 48–49) Wyandotte, Michigan, U.S.
- Party: Republican
- Children: 4
- Education: Concordia University Nebraska (BS)

Roby R. Smith (born 1977) is an American businessman and politician currently serving as Treasurer of Iowa since 2023.

== Early life ==
Roby Smith was born in Wyandotte, Michigan, in 1977. He grew up in St. Louis, Missouri. His parents were both elementary teachers.

== Political career ==
In 2006, Smith ran for the Iowa House seat in District 85, losing to Jim Lykam.

He was elected to the Iowa Senate in 2010, and represented District 47 and headed the State Government Committee.

In 2022, he defeated Michael Fitzgerald, a Democrat who had held the office of the Treasurer of Iowa since 1983.

In the 2024 Republican Party presidential primaries, Smith endorsed businessman Vivek Ramaswamy.

== Personal life ==
He is married to Kari Smith and has four children. He attends Trinity Lutheran Church in Davenport with his family, where they also live. He is a small business owner of Two Stones Design, and holds a Business Administration degree from Concordia University. He is an Eagle Scout recipient, and supporter of the Boy Scouts of America.

== Electoral history ==
2022 Iowa Treasurer election
Party	Candidate	Votes	%
Republican	Roby Smith	614,943	51.26%
Democratic	Michael Fitzgerald (incumbent)	584,021	48.68%
Write-in		667	0.06%
Total votes		1,199,631	100.0%
Republican gain from Democratic			

Iowa Senate, District 47 general election, 2018
Party	Candidate	Votes	%
Republican	Roby Smith (incumbent)	16,125	52.8
Democratic	Marie Gleason	14,418	47.2
Total votes		30,543	100.0
Republican hold			

Iowa Senate, District 41 General Election, 2014
Party	Candidate	Votes	%	±%
Republican	Roby Smith	14,988	56.4%	
Democratic	Maria Bribriesco	11,580	43.6%	
Total votes		26,568	100.0%	

Iowa Senate, District 41 General Election, 2010
Party	Candidate	Votes	%
Republican	Roby Smith	13,865	59.5
Democratic	Richard A. Clewell	9,432	40.5
Total votes		23,297	100.0
Republican hold			

2006 House District 85 election
Party	Candidate	Votes	%	±%
Democratic	Jim Lykam	5,623	54.3%	
Republican	Roby Smith	4,515	43.6%	
Total votes		10,355	100.0%	

== Notes ==
Party political offices
Preceded by Jeremy Davis	Republican nominee for Treasurer of Iowa; 2022, 2026	Most recent
Political offices
Preceded by Michael Fitzgerald	Treasurer of Iowa; 2023–present	Incumbent
