= Kenneth Owen =

American politician

Kenneth E. Owen

Secretary of Agriculture of Iowa
- In office January 1965 – January 1967

Member of the Iowa House of Representatives
- In office January 10, 1955 – January 13, 1957; January 14, 1957 – January 11, 1959; January 12, 1959 – January 8, 1961

Personal details
- Born: Kenneth Ervin Owen; September 1, 1918 Jerome, Iowa, United States
- Died: January 23, 2001 (aged 82) Jerome, Iowa, United States
- Party: Democratic

Kenneth Ervin Owen (September 1, 1918 – January 23, 2001) was an American politician from the state of Iowa.

== Early life ==
On September 1, 1918, Owen was born in Jerome, Iowa, U.S. Owen's parents were Samuel and Vera (née Sedgwick) Owen. Owen attended Centerville High School in Centerville.

== Career ==
Owen was a farmer in Jerome, Iowa. Owen served as a Democrat in the 4th district of the Iowa House of Representatives for three terms from 1955 to 1961, and for one term as the Secretary of Agriculture of Iowa from 1965 to 1967. Owen also served on the Appanoose County Farm Bureau Board and on the Jerome School Board.

== Personal life ==
In 1937, Owen married Frances Hamm. Owen had two children, Diana (née Owen) Glenn and Keith Owen. In 2001, Owen died in Jerome, Iowa. Owen is interred in Jerome Cemetery, Jerome, Iowa.

Party political offices
Preceded by Loyd Van Patten	Democratic nominee for Secretary of Agriculture of Iowa; 1964, 1966, 1968, 1970, 1972	Succeeded by Francis L. York
Iowa House of Representatives
Preceded by Robert K. Beck	4th district 1955–1961	Succeeded by Delmont Moffitt
Political offices
Preceded by Lucius B. Liddy	Secretary of Agriculture of Iowa; 1965–1967	Succeeded by Lucius B. Liddy
