= Robert H. Lounsberry =

American politician

Robert Horace Lounsberry
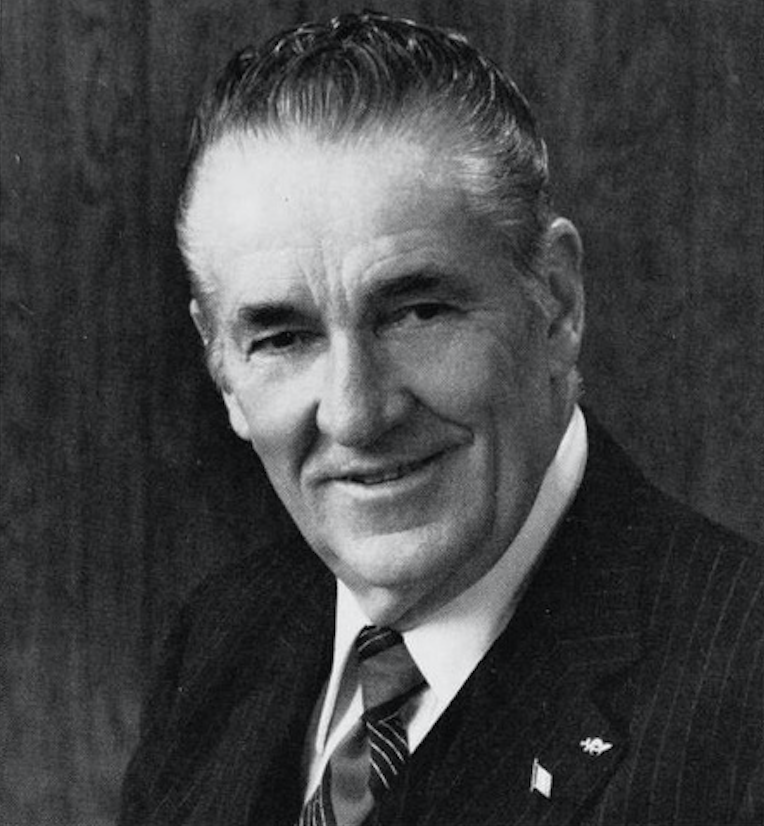
- Lounsberry in 1985

11th Iowa Secretary of Agriculture
- In office 1973–1987
- Governor: Robert D. Ray; Terry Branstad
- Preceded by: L. B. Liddy
- Succeeded by: Dale Cochran

Personal details
- Born: June 22, 1918 Carlisle, Iowa, U.S.
- Died: February 10, 2001 (aged 82) Nevada, Iowa, U.S.
- Party: Republican
- Education: Luther College

Robert Horace Lounsberry (June 22, 1918 – February 10, 2001) was the Secretary of Agriculture for the state of Iowa from 1972 to 1987, a nationally known farmer advocate during the farming crises of the 1980s, and a powerful figure in the Republican Party at both the state and national level.

Robert was born in Carlisle, Iowa. Shortly after graduating from Luther College in Decorah, Iowa, Lounsberry served in World War II as a U.S. Air Force B-24 pilot in the Asiatic Pacific Theater, where he received several military honors including the Distinguished Flying Cross, four Oak Leaf Clusters, and the Philippine Liberation Medal.

Lounsberry was active in the Republican Party, serving on the local, county, district and state levels. He was a key player in the Iowa Presidential Caucus, with Presidents Ronald Reagan, George H. W. Bush, and George W. Bush all holding campaign events at his farm near McCallsburg, Iowa.

Lounsberry was appointed Iowa Secretary of Agriculture in 1972, and was re-elected in 1974, 1978, 1982 and served until retiring on January 3, 1987. In 1978, he was elected by the largest margin in Iowa history for a statewide office. He was at the helm during farm crises of the 1980s and testified several times before the U.S. House and Senate and was a leading force in Federal farm bankruptcy laws passed during that time. He also led several international trade missions, which led to the opening of many new markets for U.S. agricultural products.

Robert Lounsberry died in February 2001 and was buried in Colo, IA.

Party political offices
Preceded by L. B. Liddy	Republican nominee for Secretary of Agriculture of Iowa; 1972, 1974, 1978, 1982	Succeeded by Thatcher Johnson
Political offices
Preceded by L. B. Liddy	Secretary of Agriculture of Iowa; 1973–1987	Succeeded by Dale Cochran
