= 2022 Iowa Secretary of Agriculture election =

- November 8, 2022
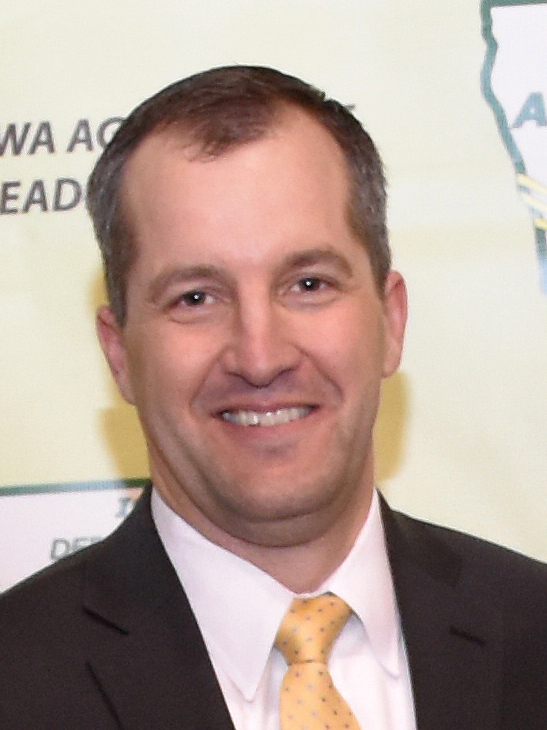

Candidate	Mike Naig	John Norwood
Party	Republican	Democratic
Popular vote	730,285	463,652
Percentage	61.13%	38.81%
- Naig: 50–60% 60–70% 70–80% 80–90% >90% Norwood: 50–60% 60–70%
Secretary of Agriculture before election
Mike Naig
Republican
Elected Secretary of Agriculture
Mike Naig
Republican

The 2022 Iowa Secretary of Agriculture election was held on November 8, 2022, to elect the Secretary of Agriculture of Iowa, concurrently with elections to the United States Senate, U.S. House of Representatives, governor, and other state and local elections. Primary elections were held on June 7, 2022.

Incumbent Republican agriculture secretary Mike Naig won re-election to a second full term in office against Polk County commissioner John Norwood in a landslide. Naig received the highest percentage of the vote of any Republican statewide candidate in 2022, and was the only statewide Republican in 2022 to win Linn County, which contains Cedar Rapids.

== Republican primary ==
=== Candidates ===
==== Nominee ====
- Mike Naig, incumbent agriculture secretary (2018–present)

=== Results ===
Republican primary results
Party	Candidate	Votes	%
Republican	Mike Naig (incumbent)	171,646	99.70%
Write-in		508	0.30%
Total votes		172,154	100.00%

== Democratic primary ==
=== Candidates ===
==== Nominee ====
- John Norwood, businessman and Polk County soil and water commissioner

=== Results ===
Democratic primary results
Party	Candidate	Votes	%
Democratic	John Norwood	139,730	99.75%
Write-in		348	0.25%
Total votes		139,730	100.00%

== General election ==
=== Results ===
2022 Iowa Secretary of Agriculture election
Party	Candidate	Votes	%
Republican	Mike Naig (incumbent)	730,285	61.13%
Democratic	John Norwood	463,652	38.81%
Write-in		770	0.06%
Total votes		1,202,707	100.00%

==== Counties that flipped from Democratic to Republican ====
Naig won 10 counties that voted for Democrat Tim Gannon in 2018.

- Black Hawk (largest city: Waterloo)
- Cerro Gordo (largest city: Mason City)
- Clinton (largest city: Clinton)
- Des Moines (largest city: Burlington)
- Dubuque (largest city: Dubuque)
- Jefferson (largest city: Fairfield)
- Lee (largest city: Fort Madison)
- Linn (largest city: Cedar Rapids)
- Scott (largest city: Davenport)
- Winneshiek (largest city: Decorah)

==== By congressional district ====
Naig won all four congressional districts.

District	Naig	Norwood	Representative
1st	58%	42%	Mariannette Miller-Meeks
2nd	60%	39%	Ashley Hinson
3rd	56%	44%	Cindy Axne (117th Congress)
3rd	56%	44%	Zach Nunn (118th Congress)
4th	71%	29%	Randy Feenstra

== See also ==
- 2022 Iowa elections
