= 2018 Iowa House of Representatives election =

- November 6, 2018

All 100 seats in the Iowa House of Representatives 51 seats needed for a majority
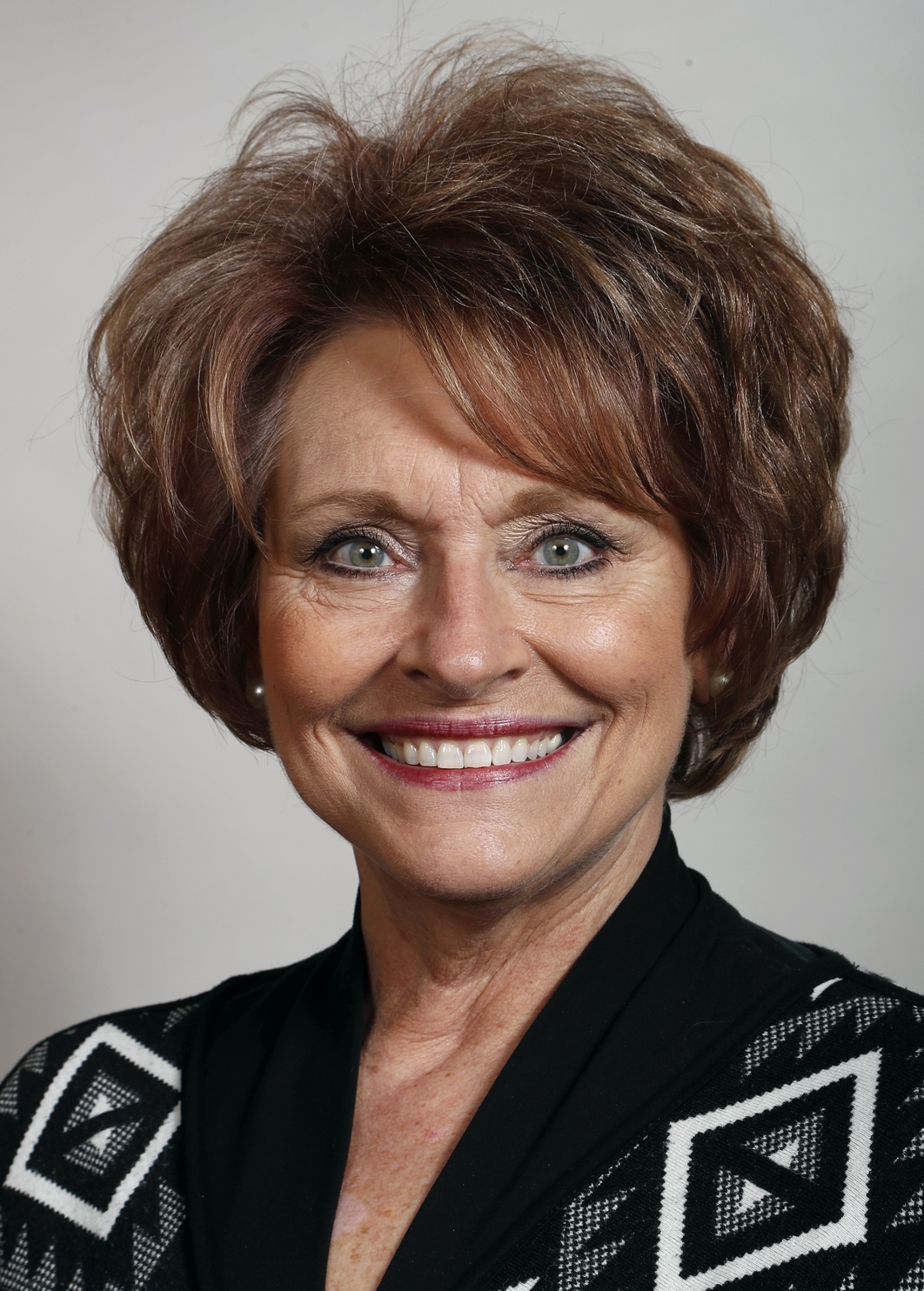

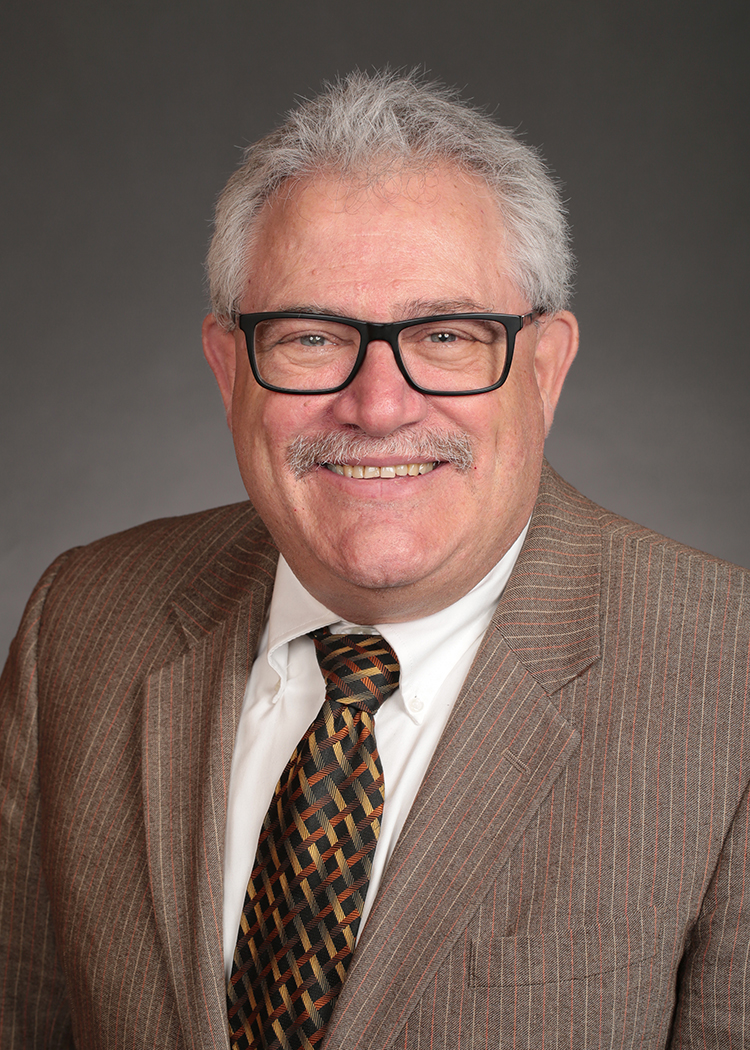
	Majority party	Minority party
Leader	Linda Upmeyer	Mark Smith
Party	Republican	Democratic
Leader since	January 14, 2016	August 10, 2013
Leader's seat	54th district	71st district
Last election	59	41
Seats won	54	46
Seat change	▼5	▲5
- Results of the elections: Republican gain Democratic gain Republican hold Democratic hold
Speaker of the House before election
Linda Upmeyer
Republican
Elected Speaker of the House
Linda Upmeyer
Republican

The 2018 Iowa House of Representative elections took place on November 6, 2018, to elect representatives from all 100 districts. The winners would serve in the 88th General Assembly, apportioned among the states based on the 2010 United States census. The Republican Party retained control of the House, while the Democratic Party gained a net of five seats.

The elections for Iowa's four congressional districts, governor, lieutenant governor, statewide officeholders, and the Iowa Senate were also held on this date.

== Predictions ==
Source	Ranking	As of
Governing	Lean R	October 8, 2018

== General election ==
=== District 1 ===
District 1 general election
Party	Candidate	Votes	%
Republican	John Wills (incumbent)	10,501	74.3
Democratic	Karen Larson	3,617	25.6
Independent	Write-ins	8	0.1
Total votes		14,126	100.0
Republican hold			

=== District 2 ===
District 2 general election
Party	Candidate	Votes	%
Republican	Megan Jones (incumbent)	8,241	66.0
Democratic	Ryan Odor	4,231	33.9
Independent	Write-ins	14	0.1
Total votes		12,486	100.0
Republican hold			

=== District 3 ===
District 3 general election
Party	Candidate	Votes	%
Republican	Daniel Huseman	10,694	99.1
Independent	Write-ins	102	0.9
Total votes		10,796	100.0
Republican hold			

=== District 4 ===
District 4 general election
Party	Candidate	Votes	%
Republican	Skyler Wheeler	11,037	95.1
Independent	Write-ins	565	4.9
Total votes		11,602	100.0
Republican hold			

=== District 5 ===
District 5 general election
Party	Candidate	Votes	%
Republican	Thomas Jeneary (incumbent)	9,774	76.8
Democratic	Andrew Emanuel	2,949	23.2
Independent	Write-ins	8	0.1
Total votes		12,731	100.0
Republican hold			

=== District 6 ===
District 6 general election
Party	Candidate	Votes	%
Republican	Jacob Bossman (incumbent)	7,092	56.4
Democratic	Rita DeJong	5,469	43.5
Independent	Write-ins	14	0.1
Total votes		12,575	100.0
Republican hold			

=== District 7 ===
District 7 general election
Party	Candidate	Votes	%
Republican	Ted Gassman (incumbent)	7,153	56.9
Democratic	Debra Jenson	5,404	43.0
Independent	Write-ins	8	0.1
Total votes		12,565	100.0
Republican hold			

=== District 8 ===
District 8 general election
Party	Candidate	Votes	%
Republican	Terry Braxtor (incumbent)	8,413	67.1
Democratic	Connie Price	4,125	32.9
Independent	Write-ins	4	0.0
Total votes		12,542	100.0
Republican hold			

=== District 9 ===
Incumbent Democrat Helen Miller announced her retirement and did not run for reelection. Republicans Ann Meyer, a registered nurse, and Gary Waechter, ran. Democrat Megan Srinivas, a physician, announced her candidacy.

The primary election was held on June 5, 2018.

District 9 Republican primary
Party	Candidate	Votes	%
Republican	Ann Meyer	873	67.3
Republican	Gary Waechter	421	32.5
Independent	Write-ins	3	0.2
Total votes		1,297	100.0

District 9 Democratic primary
Party	Candidate	Votes	%
Democratic	Megan Srinivas	1,131	99.6
Independent	Write-ins	5	0.4
Total votes		1,136	100.0

District 9 general election
Party	Candidate	Votes	%
Republican	Ann Meyer	5,604	51.7
Democratic	Megan Srinivas	5,221	48.2
Independent	Write-ins	8	0.1
Total votes		10,833	100.0
Republican gain from Democratic			

=== District 10 ===
Republican incumbent Mike Sexton sought reelection for a third term. he faced former 2012 and 2016 Presidential Candidate Tom Hoefling in the Tepublican primary. Jake Thompson ran for the Democratic nomination.

Republican primary

District 10 Republican primary
Party	Candidate	Votes	%
Republican	Mike Sexton (incumbent)	1,354	76.3
Republican	Tom Hoefling	421	23.7
Total votes		1,775	100.0

Democratic primary

Thompson faced no primary challenger.

District 10 general election
Party	Candidate	Votes	%
Republican	Mike Sexton (incumbent)	8,595	67.0
Democratic	Jake Thompson	4,211	32.8
Independent	Write-ins/others	15	0.1
Total votes		12,821	100.0
Republican hold			

=== District 11 ===
Incumbent Republican Gary Worthan ran unopposed.

District 11 general election
Party	Candidate	Votes	%
Republican	Gary Worthan (incumbent)	8,376	97.8
Independent	Write-ins	186	2.2
Total votes		8,562	100.0
Republican hold			

=== District 12 ===
Republican Brian Best ran for a third term. He faced Democrat Peter Leo in the general election.

District 12 general election
Party	Candidate	Votes	%
Republican	Brian Best (incumbent)	8,458	65.7
Democratic	Peter Leo	4,402	34.3
Total votes		12,865	100.0
Republican hold			

=== District 13 ===
Incumbent Democrat Chris Hall ran unopposed for a fifth term.

District 13 general election
Party	Candidate	Votes	%
Democratic	Chris Hall (incumbent)	6,685	95.5
Independent	Write-ins	325	4.5
Total votes		6,997	100.0
Democratic hold			

=== District 14 ===
Incumbent Democrat Timothy Kacena ran against Republican Robert Henderson, whom Kacena had narrowly defeated in 2016.

District 14 general election
Party	Candidate	Votes	%
Democratic	Tim Kacena	4,606	53.9
Republican	Robert Henderson	3,936	46.0
Total votes		8,542	100.0
Democratic hold			

=== District 15 ===
Incumbent Democrat Charlie McConkey ran for reelection against Republican LeAnn Hughes in the general election.

District 15 Republican primary
Party	Candidate	Votes	%
Republican	LeAnn Hughes	355	58.9
Republican	Sarah Abdouch	132	21.9
Republican	Mark Hunter (withdrawn)	116	19.2
Total votes		603	100.0

District 15 general election
Party	Candidate	Votes	%
Democratic	Charlie McConkey (incumbent)	4,635	56.3
Republican	LeAnn Hughes	3,590	43.6
Independent	Write-ins	10	0.1
Total votes		8,235	100.0
Democratic hold			

=== District 16 ===
Democrat Steve Gorman nearly pulled off an upset against Republican incumbent Mary Ann Hanusa. Libertarian Party candidate Steve Sechrest also ran.

District 16 general election
Party	Candidate	Votes	%
Republican	Mary Ann Hanusa (incumbent)	4,949	49.5
Democratic	Steve Gorman	4,835	48.4
Libertarian	Steve Sechrest	208	2.1
Independent	Write-ins/others	4	0.0
Total votes		9,996	100.0
Republican hold			

=== District 17 ===
Republican incumbent Matt Windschitl ran against Democrat Jan Creasman.

District 17 general election
Party	Candidate	Votes	%
Republican	Matt Windschitl (incumbent)	8,584	71.1
Democratic	Jan Creasman	3,468	28.7
Independent	Write-ins	18	0.1
Total votes		12,070	100.0
Republican hold			

=== District 18 ===
Steven Holt ran unopposed in the general election.

District 18 general election
Party	Candidate	Votes	%
Republican	Steven Holt (incumbent)	8,316	97.2
Independent	Write-ins	242	2.8
Total votes		8,558	100.0
Republican hold			

=== District 19 ===
House Majority leader Chris Hagenow, who previously represented District 43, planned to move with his family to run in the 19th District. Democrat Gregg Gustafson and independent candidate Richard Dedor also ran.

District 19 general election
Party	Candidate	Votes	%
Republican	Chris Hagenow (incumbent)	10,539	56.2
Democratic	Gregg Gustafson	7,689	41.0
Independent	Richard Dedor	498	2.7
Independent	Write-ins/others	15	0.1
Total votes		18,741	100.0
Republican hold			

=== District 20 ===
District 20 Republican primary
Party	Candidate	Votes	%
Republican	Ray Sorensen	1,370	84.5
Republican	Dodge Perrigo	252	15.5
Total votes		1,622	100.0

District 20 general election
Party	Candidate	Votes	%
Republican	Roy Sorensen	7,659	62.3
Democratic	Warren Varley	4,625	37.6
Independent	Write-ins	15	0.1
Total votes		12,299	100.0
Republican hold			

=== District 21 ===
District 21 general election
Party	Candidate	Votes	%
Republican	Tom Moore (incumbent)	7,932	65.7
Democratic	Denise O'Brien	4,139	34.3
Independent	Write-ins	6	0.0
Total votes		12,077	100.0
Republican hold			

=== District 22 ===
District 22 general election
Party	Candidate	Votes	%
Republican	Jon Jacobson (incumbent)	9,707	65.9
Democratic	Ray Stevens	5,003	34.0
Independent	Write-ins	21	0.1
Total votes		14,731	100.0
Republican hold			

=== District 23 ===
District 23 general election
Party	Candidate	Votes	%
Republican	David Sieck (incumbent)	7,931	66.1
Democratic	Chuck Larson	4,060	33.8
Independent	Write-ins	7	0.1
Total votes		11,998	100.0
Republican hold			

=== District 24 ===
District 24 general election
Party	Candidate	Votes	%
Republican	Cecil Dolecheck (incumbent)	7,709	67.7
Democratic	James Uhlenkamp	3,666	32.2
Independent	Write-ins	5	0.1
Total votes		11,380	100.0
Republican hold			

=== District 25 ===
District 25 general election
Party	Candidate	Votes	%
Republican	Stan Gustafson (incumbent)	9,420	59.2
Democratic	Ryan Marquardt	6,470	40.7
Independent	Write-ins	10	0.1
Total votes		15,900	100.0
Republican hold			

=== District 26 ===
District 26 Republican primary
Party	Candidate	Votes	%
Republican	Rebel Snodgrass	683	57.5
Republican	Jeffrey Janssen	505	42.5
Total votes		1,188	100.0

District 26 general election
Party	Candidate	Votes	%
Democratic	Scott Ourth (incumbent)	8,195	55.4
Republican	Rebel Snodgrass	6,572	44.4
Independent	Write-ins	24	0.2
Total votes		14,791	100.0
Democratic hold			

=== District 27 ===
District 27 general election
Party	Candidate	Votes	%
Republican	Joel Fry (incumbent)	7,691	69.0
Democratic	Richard Foster	3,441	30.9
Independent	Write-ins	11	0.1
Total votes		11,143	100.0
Republican hold			

=== District 28 ===
Incumbent Greg Heartsill did not seek reelection.

Democratic primary

Democrats Ann Fields and Zachary Pendroy both ran.

District 28 Democratic primary
Party	Candidate	Votes	%
Democratic	Ann Fields	1,018	82.2
Democratic	Zach Pendroy	221	17.8
Total votes		1,239	100.0

Republican primary

Jon Thorup and Jon Van Wyk both vied for this seat.

District 28 Republican primary
Party	Candidate	Votes	%
Republican	Jon Thorup	1,160	61.7
Republican	Jon Van Wyk	721	38.3
Total votes		1,881	100.0

District 28 general election
Party	Candidate	Votes	%
Republican	Jon Thorup	8,132	64.1
Democratic	Ann Fields	4,538	35.8
Independent	Write-ins	7	0.1
Total votes		12,677	100.0
Republican hold			

=== District 29 ===
District 29 general election
Party	Candidate	Votes	%
Democratic	Wesley Breckenridge (incumbent)	7,620	58.7
Republican	Ann Howell	5,354	41.2
Independent	Write-ins	16	0.1
Total votes		12,900	100.0
Democratic hold			

=== District 30 ===
District 30 general election
Party	Candidate	Votes	%
Republican	Brian Lohse	9,463	56.1
Democratic	Kent Balduchi	7,378	43.8
Independent	Write-ins	14	0.1
Total votes		16,855	100.0
Republican hold			

=== District 31 ===
District 31 general election
Party	Candidate	Votes	%
Democratic	Rick Olson (incumbent)	8,576	100.0
Total votes		8,576	100.0
Democratic hold			

=== District 32 ===
District 32 general election
Party	Candidate	Votes	%
Democratic	Ruth Ann Gaines (incumbent)	6,250	70.2
Republican	William Charlier	2,388	26.8
Libertarian	ToyA S. Johnson	250	2.8
Total votes		8,901	100.0
Democratic hold			

=== District 33 ===
District 33 general election
Party	Candidate	Votes	%
Democratic	Brian Meyer (incumbent)	6,886	67.6
Republican	Gregory Malone	3,283	32.2
Total votes		10,191	100.0
Democratic hold			

=== District 34 ===
District 34 general election
Party	Candidate	Votes	%
Democratic	Bruce Hunter (incumbent)	7,930	67.4
Republican	Jerry Cheevers	3,229	27.5
Libertarian	Marrianna Collins	590	5.0
Total votes		11,760	100.0
Democratic hold			

=== District 35 ===
District 35 general election
Party	Candidate	Votes	%
Democratic	Ako Abdul-Samad (incumbent)	5,682	77.8
Libertarian	John Callahan	1,552	21.3
Independent	Write-ins	65	0.9
Total votes		7,299	100.0
Democratic hold			

=== District 36 ===
District 36 general election
Party	Candidate	Votes	%
Democratic	Marti Anderson (incumbent)	11,246	80.3
Libertarian	Joseph Howe	2,687	19.2
Independent	Write-ins	67	0.5
Total votes		14,000	100.0
Democratic hold			

=== District 37 ===
District 37 general election
Party	Candidate	Votes	%
Republican	John Landon (incumbent)	10,428	52.0
Democratic	Andrew Rasmussen	9,618	47.9
Independent	Write-ins	25	0.1
Total votes		20,071	100.0
Republican hold			

=== District 38 ===
District 38 general election
Party	Candidate	Votes	%
Democratic	Heather Matson	8,216	51.5
Republican	Kevin Koester (incumbent)	7,710	48.2
Independent	Write-ins	15	0.1
Total votes		15,941	100.0
Democratic gain from Republican			

=== District 39 ===
District 39 general election
Party	Candidate	Votes	%
Democratic	Karin Derry	9,658	49.8
Republican	Jake Highfill (incumbent)	9,353	48.3
Libertarian	Anthony Junk	362	1.9
Independent	Write-ins	9	0.0
Total votes		19,382	100.0
Democratic gain from Republican			

=== District 40 ===
District 40 general election
Party	Candidate	Votes	%
Democratic	John Forbes (incumbent)	11,565	96.8
Independent	Write-ins	382	3.2
Total votes		11,947	100.0
Democratic hold			

=== District 41 ===
District 41 general election
Party	Candidate	Votes	%
Democratic	Jo Oldson (incumbent)	12,279	84.8
Independent	Claudia Addy	2,109	14.6
Independent	Write-ins	87	0.6
Total votes		14,475	100.0
Democratic hold			

=== District 42 ===
Kristin Sunde challenged Republican incumbent Peter Cownie in a key West Des Moines suburban seat.

District 42 general election
Party	Candidate	Votes	%
Democratic	Kristin Sunde	8,346	53.8
Republican	Peter Cownie (incumbent)	7,155	46.1
Independent	Write-ins	10	0.1
Total votes		15,511	100.0
Democratic gain from Republican			

=== District 43 ===
District 43 general election
Party	Candidate	Votes	%
Democratic	Jennifer Konfrst	8,852	56.7
Republican	Micheal Boel	6,431	41.2
Libertarian	Chad Brewbaker	318	2.0
Independent	Write-ins	11	0.1
Total votes		15,612	100.0
Democratic gain from Republican			

=== District 44 ===
District 44 general election
Party	Candidate	Votes	%
Democratic	Kenan Judge	11,169	51.7
Republican	Anna Bergman	9,959	46.1
Libertarian	Gabriel Thomson	469	2.2
Independent	Write-ins	10	0.0
Total votes		21,607	100.0
Democratic gain from Republican			
