= Robert K. Beck =

American politician and newspaper publisher

Member of the Iowa House of Representatives from the 4th district
- In office January 12, 1953 – January 9, 1955
- Preceded by: Ted D. Clark
- Succeeded by: Kenneth E. Owen

Personal details
- Born: Robert Knowlton Beck; July 17, 1915 Centerville, Iowa, U.S.
- Died: January 13, 2004 (aged 88) Chariton, Iowa, U.S.
- Party: Republican
- Education: Iowa Wesleyan University
- Occupation: Newspaper Publisher

Robert Knowlton Beck (July 17, 1915 – January 13, 2004) was an American politician and newspaper publisher from the state of Iowa.

Beck was born in Centerville, Appanoose County, Iowa, in 1915. He graduated from Centerville High School in 1933 and from Iowa Wesleyan College, as it was then known, in 1937. Beck was a veteran of World War II and served with the United States Navy on the USS South Dakota for 27 months. His ship saw heavy action, including being buzzed by kamikaze pilots during the Philippine invasion and being struck by a bomb during one battle. He mustered out of the Navy in 1945 as a lieutenant.

Following the war, Beck sat for one term as a Republican in the Iowa House of Representatives from January 12, 1953, to January 9, 1955. Her was the publisher of the Centerville Daily Iowegian newspaper. He acquired a majority interest in the newspaper in 1950 and turned it into a state and national award winner. Under his guidance, the Iowegian earned three Iowa General Excellence Awards, the Iowa Community Service Award in 1963 and 1983, as well as numerous statewide awards for news, advertising, editorial excellence and industrial support. Beck was named an Iowa master editor-publisher in 1963, was president of the Iowa Newspaper Association in 1969-70 and earned the Bent Cane Award from the Des Moines Press Club in 1959.

Beck died in Chariton, Iowa, on January 13, 2004.

Iowa House of Representatives
| Preceded by Ted D. Clark | 4th district 1953–1955 | Succeeded by Kenneth Owen |
