= Maurice E. Baringer =

American politician (1921–2011)

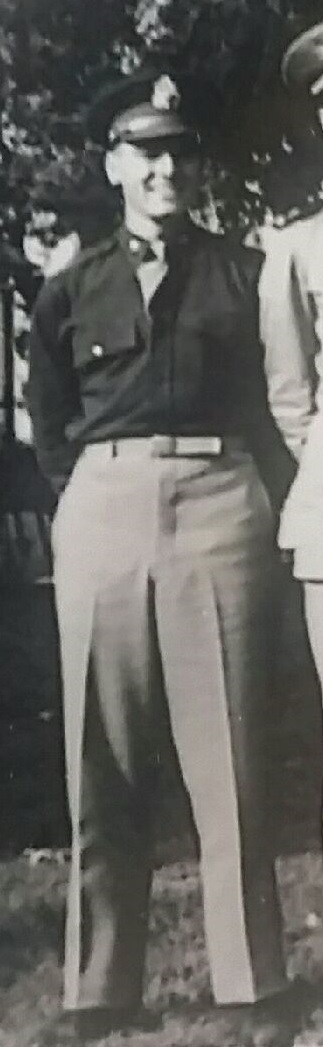
- Baringer in 1943

24th Treasurer of Iowa
- In office 1969–1983
- Preceded by: Paul Franzenburg
- Succeeded by: Michael Fitzgerald

Speaker of the Iowa House of Representatives
- In office January 9, 1967 – January 12, 1969
- Preceded by: Vincent B. Steffen
- Succeeded by: William H. Harbor

Member of the Iowa House of Representatives from the 71st district
- In office January 9, 1961 – January 12, 1969

Personal details
- Born: Maurice Edmund Baringer; December 4, 1921 Arkansas City, Kansas, U.S.
- Died: May 25, 2011 (aged 89) Des Moines, Iowa, U.S.
- Party: Republican
- Spouse: Dorothy Mae Schlensig (m. 1948)
- Children: 4
- Education: University of Kansas; Iowa State University
- Occupation: Politician, educator

Military service
- Allegiance: United States
- Branch/service: United States Army (United States Army Air Forces)
- Battles/wars: World War II

Maurice "Mo" Edmund Baringer (December 4, 1921 – May 25, 2011) was an American educator and politician.

== Biography ==
Maurice "Mo" Edmund Baringer was born December 4, 1921, in Arkansas City, Kansas. He graduated from Arkansas City High School and continued his education at the University of Kansas, from which he received his bachelor's degree in business in 1943. He served in the United States Army Air Forces during World War II and was stationed in the Pacific. He served as an anti-aircraft artillery officer. He then earned his bachelor's and master's degree in animal husbandry from Iowa State University in 1947–1949. Baringer worked in the commercial feed business in management, nutrition, and sales. Baringer taught animal husbandry at Iowa State University. He lived in Oelwein, Iowa. Baringer served in the Iowa House of Representatives from 1961 to 1969. He served as speaker of the house from 1967 to 1969 and was a Republican. In 1967, the Statehouse Press Corps presented him a citation as outstanding Representative. From 1969 to 1982, Baringer served as Treasurer of Iowa. He raised horses and cattle at his farm in Woodburn, Iowa after his retirement.

Baringer met his wife, Dorothy Mae Schlensig, while attending Iowa State University and they married in 1948. He and his wife had four children: two sons and two daughters. Baringer died suddenly on May 25, 2011, at Mercy Hospital in Des Moines, Iowa.

== Notes ==
Party political offices
Preceded by Dale Awtry	Republican nominee for Treasurer of Iowa; 1968, 1970, 1972, 1974, 1978, 1982	Succeeded by Jack Nystrom
