= L. B. Liddy =

American politician

Secretary of Agriculture of Iowa
- In office June 1961 – January 1965; January 1967 – January 1973

Personal details
- Born: August 22, 1905; Strawberry Point, Iowa, United States
- Died: April 2, 1990 (aged 84); Des Moines, Iowa, United States
- Political party: Republican
- Children: 3

Lucius B. (L. B.) Liddy (August 22, 1905 – April 2, 1990) was an American politician from the state of Iowa.

Liddy was born in Strawberry Point, Iowa in 1905. He was appointed Secretary of Agriculture of Iowa on June 19, 1961, five days after his predecessor, Clyde Spry, died (June 14). Liddy served out the remaining of Spry's term until himself being elected in the same position for the 1963 to 1965 term. As Democrats swept the polls in Iowa for the 1965 to 1967 term, he was succeeded by Kenneth Owen. When Republicans regained control, Liddy in turn succeeded Owen for the 1967 to 1969 term, as well as the 1969 to 1971 and 1971 to 1973 terms. In January 1973, Liddy was succeeded by his deputy, Robert H. Lounsberry. Liddy died in Des Moines, Iowa in 1990. He was married with three children.

Party political offices
Preceded by Clyde Spry	Republican nominee for Secretary of Agriculture of Iowa; 1960, 1962, 1964, 1966, 1968, 1970	Succeeded by Robert H. Lounsberry
Political offices
Preceded by Clyde Spry	Secretary of Agriculture of Iowa; 1961–1965	Succeeded by Kenneth Owen
Preceded by Kenneth Owen	Secretary of Agriculture of Iowa; 1967–1973	Succeeded by Robert H. Lounsberry
