= Jerome, Iowa =

- Unincorporated community
- Location within Iowa
- Coordinates: 40°43′08″N 93°01′42″W
- Country: United States
- State: Iowa
- County: Appanoose
- Elevation: 1,037 ft (316 m)
- Time zone: UTC-6 (Central (CST))
  - Summer (DST): UTC-5 (CDT)
- Area code: 641
- GNIS feature ID: 457945

Jerome is an unincorporated community in Appanoose County, Iowa, United States.

== History ==
The population was 275 in 1940.

== Notable person ==
Kenneth Owen (1918–2001), Iowa farmer and politician, was born in Jerome.
