= Iowa's 71st House of Representatives district =

American legislative district

House District 71
- Type: District of the Lower house
- Location: Iowa
- Representative: Lindsay James
- Parent organization: Iowa General Assembly

The 71st District of the Iowa House of Representatives in the state of Iowa. It is currently composed of part of Dubuque County.

== Current elected officials ==
Lindsay James is the representative currently representing the district.

== Past representatives ==
The district has previously been represented by:

- Maurice E. Baringer, 1961–1969
- Richard F. Drake, 1971–1973
- Emil J. Husak, 1973–1981
- Janet Carl, 1981–1983
- Dennis Black, 1983–1993
- Thomas Baker, 1993–1997
- Wayne Ford, 1997–2003
- Jim Van Engelenhoven, 2003–2013
- Mark Smith, 2013–2021
- Sue Cahill, 2021–2023
- Lindsay James, 2023–2027
- Sam Wooden, 2027
