= Bloody Run (Wisconsin) =

Stream in Wisconsin, U.S.

Coordinates: 44°20′36″N 89°48′14″W

Bloody Run is a stream in the U.S. state of Wisconsin. It is a tributary to Nepco Lake.

Bloody Run was so named on account of the reddish hue of its iron-impregnated waters. A variant name is "Bloody Run Creek".
