= Tisová (Ústí nad Orlicí District) =

- Municipality
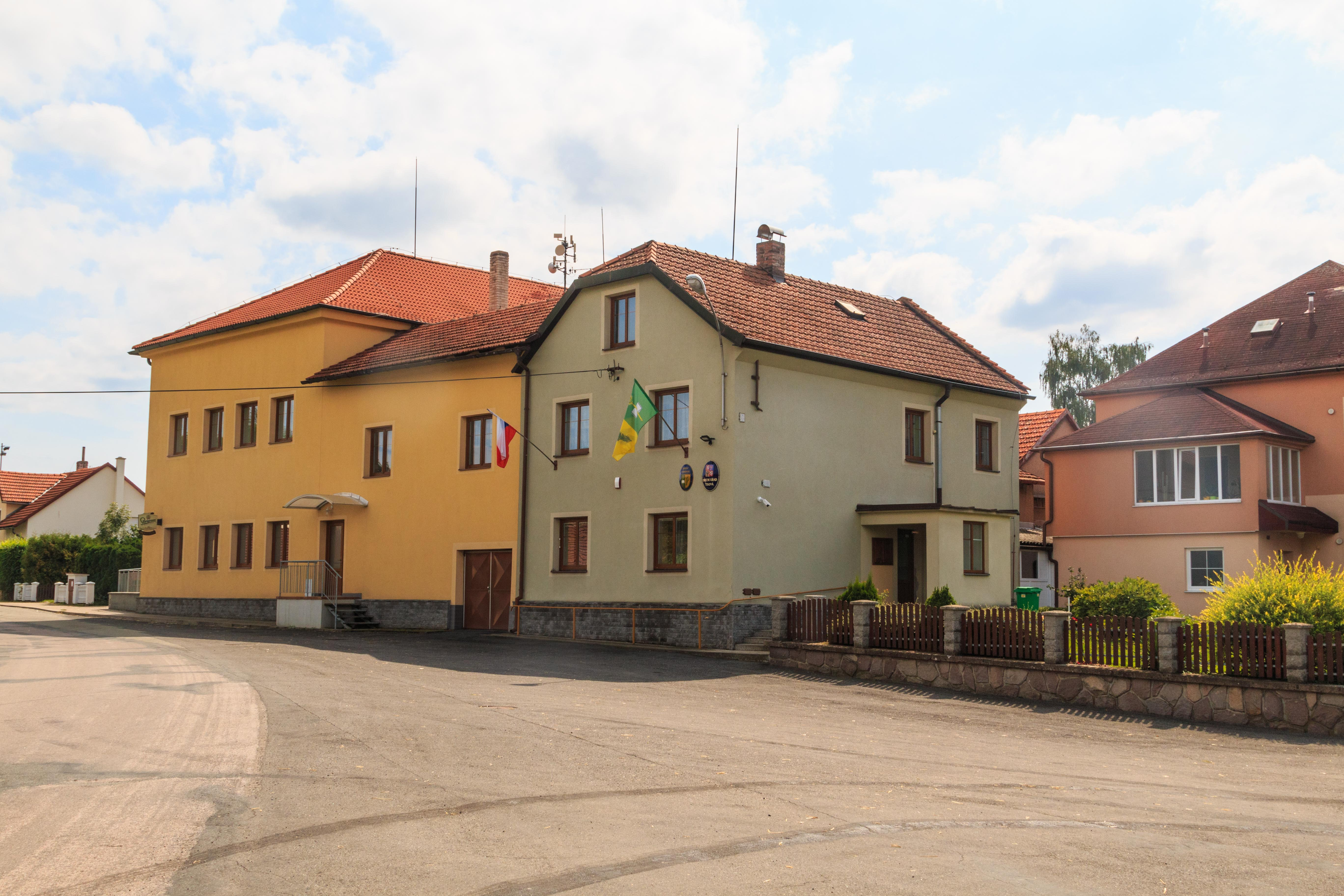
- Municipal office

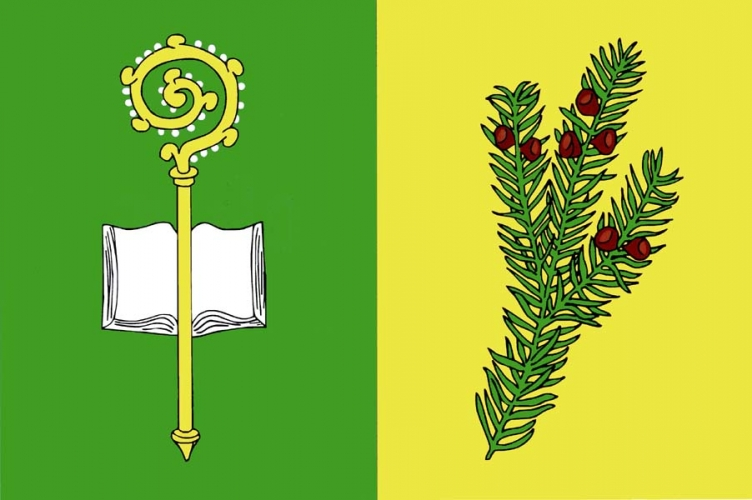
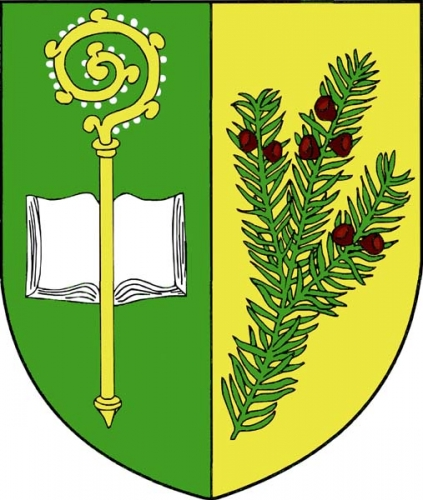
- Flag Coat of arms

- Location in the Czech Republic
- Coordinates: 49°56′10″N 16°13′29″E
- Country: Czech Republic
- Region: Pardubice
- District: Ústí nad Orlicí
- First mentioned: 1407

Area
  - Total: 10.97 km^{2} (4.24 sq mi)
- Elevation: 292 m (958 ft)

Population (2026-01-01)
  - Total: 628
  - Density: 57.2/km^{2} (148/sq mi)
- Time zone: UTC+1 (CET)
  - Summer (DST): UTC+2 (CEST)
- Postal code: 566 01
- Website: www.tisova.cz

Tisová (German: Tisau) a municipality and village in Ústí nad Orlicí District in the Pardubice Region of the Czech Republic. It has about 600 inhabitants.

Tisová lies approximately 14 kilometres (9 mi) west of Ústí nad Orlicí, 34 kilometres (21 mi) east of Pardubice, and 130 kilometres (81 mi) east of Prague.

== Administrative division ==
Tisová consists of two municipal parts (in brackets population according to the 2021 census):

- Tisová (476)
- Zaháj (86)

== Demographics ==
Historical population
Year	Pop.	±%
1869	745	—
1880	690	−7.4%
1890	723	+4.8%
1900	767	+6.1%
1910	849	+10.7%
1921	726	−14.5%
1930	803	+10.6%
1950	524	−34.7%
1961	584	+11.5%
1970	545	−6.7%
1980	539	−1.1%
1991	525	−2.6%
2001	510	−2.9%
2011	554	+8.6%
2021	562	+1.4%
Source: Censuses
