= Elmwood-St. Joseph Municipal Cemetery =

United States historic place in Cerro Gordo County, Iowa

- Elmwood-St. Joseph Municipal Cemetery Historic District
- U.S. National Register of Historic Places
- U.S. Historic district
- Location within Iowa Location within the United States
- Location: 1224 S Washington Ave. Mason City, Iowa
- Coordinates: 43°08′23″N 93°12′18″W
- NRHP reference No.: 100002541
- Added to NRHP: June 7, 2018

Elmwood-St. Joseph Municipal Cemetery is located in Mason City, Iowa, United States. It was listed as a historic district on the National Register of Historic Places in 2018.

== History ==
The first cemetery in the city was a small burial ground established in 1853 in the northeast section of town. Elmwood Cemetery began on May 11, 1867, when the Mason City Cemetery Association bought 5 acres (2.0 ha) of land from John Dexter on the city's southwest side. St. Joseph Cemetery was established just north of the Mason City Cemetery in 1875. The bodies from the cemetery on the northeast side of town were relocated to Mason City Cemetery in 1893, and its name was changed to Elmwood the following year. The first of Elmwood's seven mausoleums was completed in 1908. Mason City took over operations of both cemeteries in 1949 when they were deeded to the city and Elmwood-St. Joseph Municipal Cemetery was created. In 1958, the low areas of the cemetery were filled in, and the water pond was created simultaneously. The cemetery's office building was also constructed in 1958. The cemetery contains the graves of many of the community's pioneers, city founders, and civic leaders. There are military veterans from the American Civil War to the present.

== Notable burials ==
Notable burials include:

- Henry I. Smith, American Civil War Medal of Honor recipient
- Meredith Willson, composer
