= 2018 Iowa elections =

The 2018 Iowa elections were held in the U.S. state of Iowa on November 6, 2018. A closed primary election was held on June 5, 2018. All of Iowa's executive officers were up for election, as well as all four of Iowa's seats in the United States House of Representatives, 25 (half) of the seats in the Iowa Senate, and all 100 seats in the Iowa House of Representatives.

== Governorship ==
Incumbent Republican governor Terry Branstad, who had served for two consecutive and six total terms as Iowa governor, resigned to be the United States Ambassador to China in 2017. Lieutenant Governor Kim Reynolds assumed the governorship and was seeking a full term.

=== Results ===
Iowa gubernatorial election, 2018
Party	Candidate	Votes	%
Republican	Kim Reynolds (incumbent)	667,275	50.3
Democratic	Fred Hubbell	630,986	47.5
Libertarian	Jake Porter	21,427	1.6
Independent	Gary Siegwarth	7,463	0.6
Write-in		488	0.0
Total votes		1,327,638	100.0
Republican hold			

== Attorney general ==
Incumbent Democratic attorney general Tom Miller had served in the position since 1995, and previously from 1979 to 1991. The Republican Party did not nominate anyone, but the Libertarian Party nominated Marco Battaglia.

=== Democratic primary ===
==== Results ====
Democratic primary results
Party	Candidate	Votes	%
Democratic	Tom Miller (incumbent)	157,483	99.7
Democratic	Write-ins	546	0.3
Total votes		158,029	100.0

=== General election ===
==== Results ====
Iowa Attorney General election, 2018
Party	Candidate	Votes	%
Democratic	Tom Miller (incumbent)	880,531	76.5
Libertarian	Marco Battaglia	262,131	22.8
Write-in		8,237	0.7
Total votes		1,150,899	100.0
Democratic hold			

== Secretary of state ==
2018 Iowa Secretary of State election
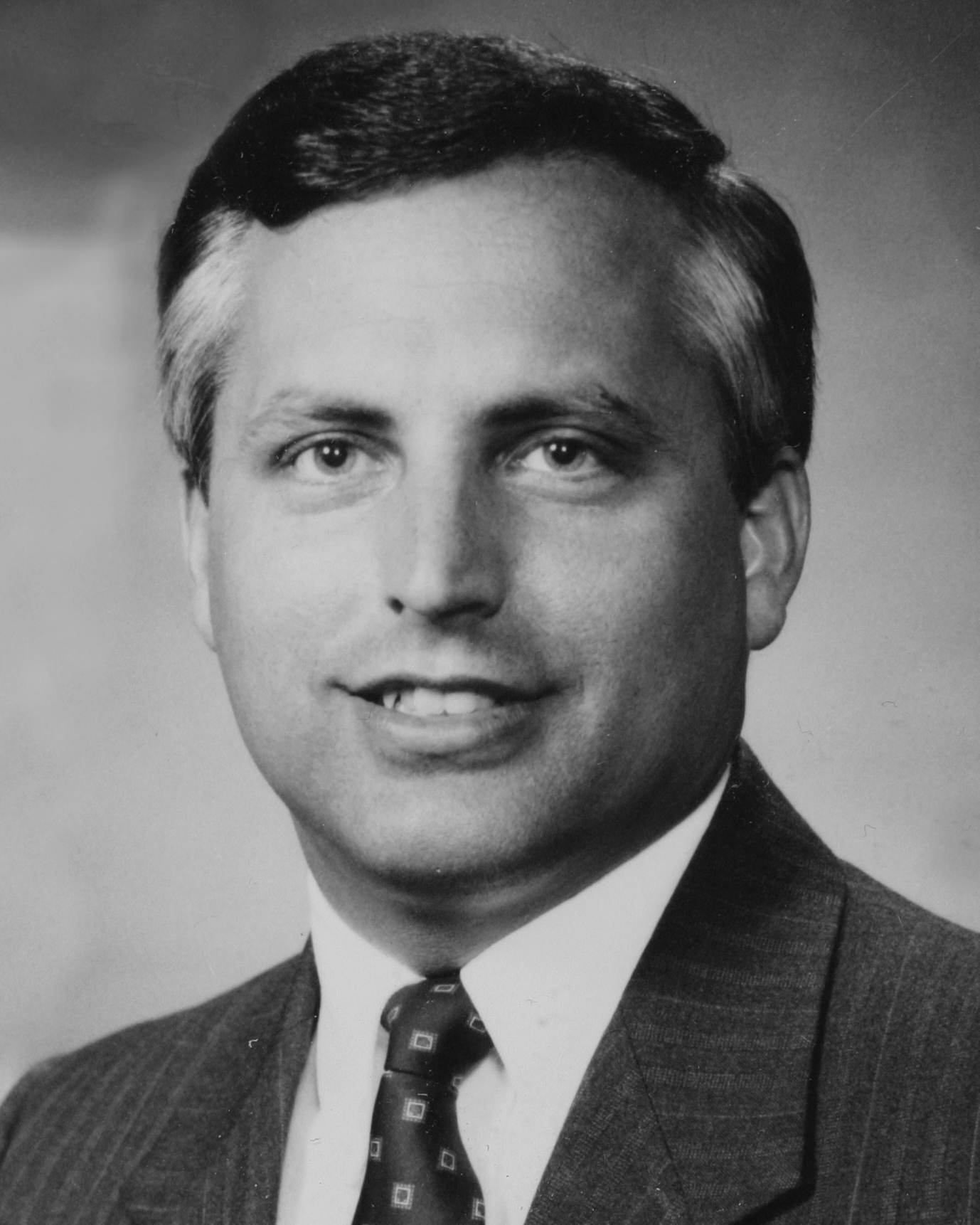

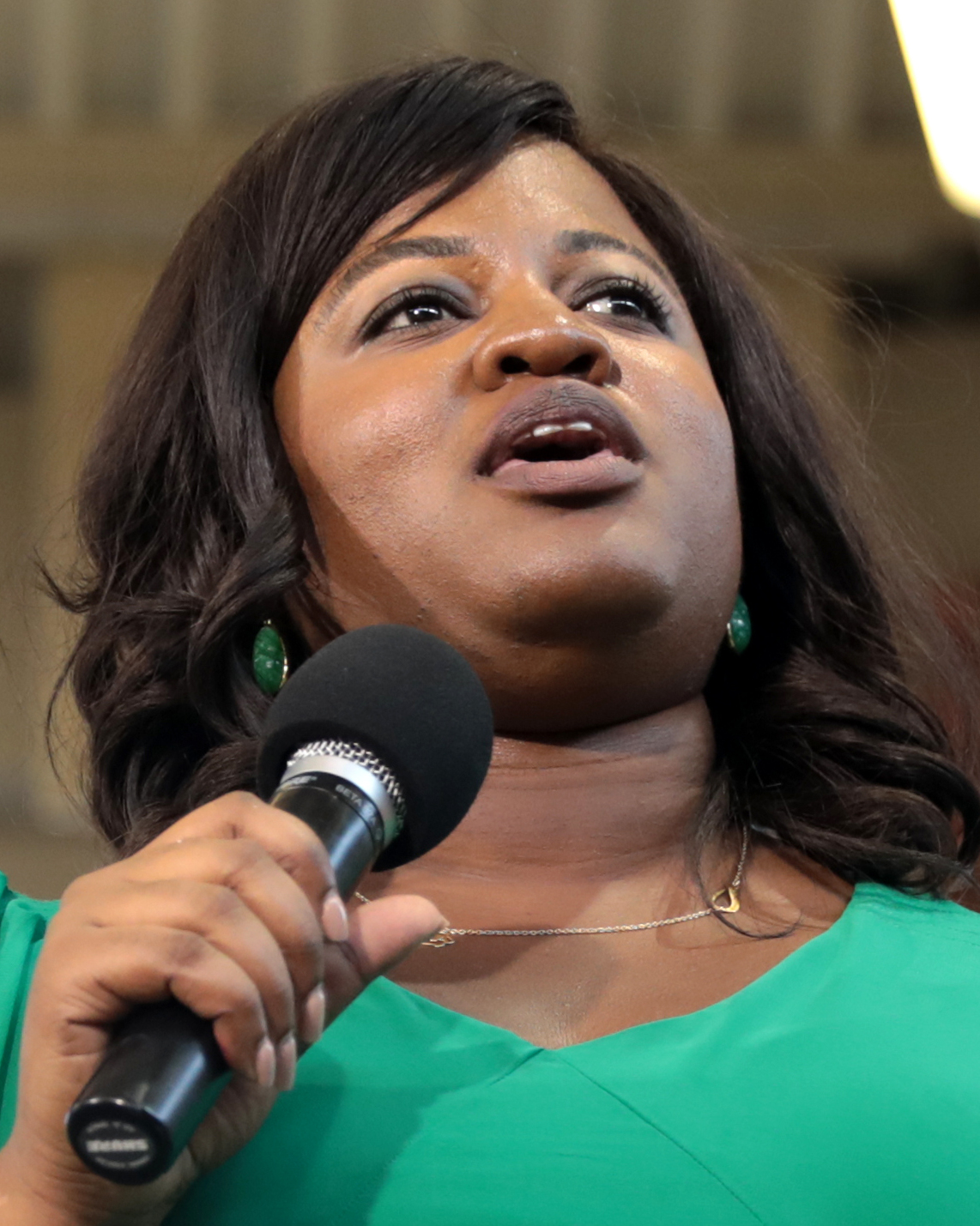
Candidate	Paul Pate	Deidre DeJear
Party	Republican	Democratic
Popular vote	685,780	583,774
Percentage	52.7%	44.9%
- Pate: 40–50% 50–60% 60–70% 70–80% 80–90% DeJear: 50–60% 60–70%
Secretary of State before election
Paul Pate
Republican
Elected Secretary of State
Paul Pate
Republican

=== Democratic primary ===
- Deidre DeJear
- Jim Mowrer

==== Results ====
Democratic primary results
Party	Candidate	Votes	%
Democratic	Deidre DeJear	82,221	51.1
Democratic	Jim Mowrer	78,409	48.7
Democratic	Write-ins	312	0.2
Total votes		160,942	100.0

=== Republican primary ===
- Paul Pate, incumbent

==== Results ====
Republican primary results
Party	Candidate	Votes	%
Republican	Paul D. Pate (incumbent)	88,303	99.6
Republican	Write-ins	327	0.4
Total votes		88,630	100.0

=== General election ===
==== Predictions ====
Source	Ranking	As of
Governing magazine	Lean R	June 4, 2018

==== Endorsements ====
Deidre DeJear (D)

U.S. executive branch officials

- Barack Obama, 44th president of the United States

==== Results ====
Iowa Secretary of State election, 2018
Party	Candidate	Votes	%
Republican	Paul Pate (incumbent)	685,780	52.7
Democratic	Deidre DeJear	583,774	44.9
Libertarian	Jules Ofenbakh	30,881	2.4
Write-in		482	0.0
Total votes		1,300,917	100.0
Republican hold			

== Treasurer ==
Incumbent Democratic state treasurer Michael L. Fitzgerald, who had served in the position since 1983, ran for reelection to a tenth term in office. Fitzgerald faced Republican Jeremy Davis.

=== Results ===
Iowa State Treasurer election, 2018
Party	Candidate	Votes	%
Democratic	Michael L. Fitzgerald (incumbent)	710,426	54.8
Republican	Jeremy Davis	553,691	42.7
Libertarian	Tim Hird	31,268	2.4
Write-in		465	0.1
Total votes		1,295,850	100.0
Democratic hold			

== Auditor ==
Incumbent Auditor Mary Mosiman, who had served since 2013, ran for re-election but was defeated by attorney Rob Sand.

=== Results ===
Iowa State Auditor election, 2018
Party	Candidate	Votes	%
Democratic	Rob Sand	660,169	51.0
Republican	Mary Mosiman (incumbent)	601,320	46.4
Libertarian	Fred Perryman	33,421	2.6
Write-in		458	0.0
Total votes		1,295,368	100.0
Democratic gain from Republican			

== Secretary of Agriculture ==
2018 Iowa Secretary of Agriculture election
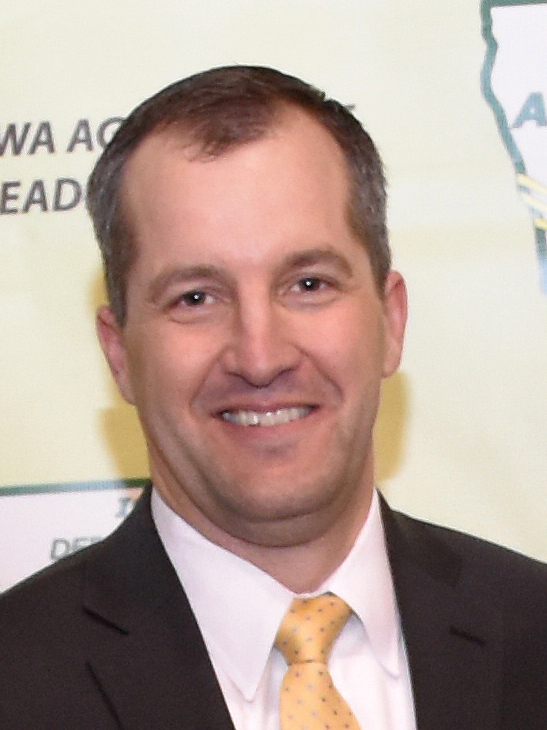

Candidate	Mike Naig	Tim Gannon
Party	Republican	Democratic
Popular vote	651,552	602,916
Percentage	50.3%	46.6%
- Naig: 40–50% 50–60% 60–70% 70–80% 80–90% Gannon: 40–50% 50–60% 60–70%
Secretary of Agriculture before election
Mike Naig
Republican
Elected Secretary of Agriculture
Mike Naig
Republican

Republican Secretary of Agriculture Bill Northey had served in the position since 2007. Northey was considering running for Iowa governor, but after Governor Terry Branstad was nominated to be Ambassador to China, he announced he would not run. Northey had not ruled out running for reelection in 2018, but said he would be willing to serve as lieutenant governor instead if asked. In 2018, he was nominated by President Donald Trump to be Under Secretary of Agriculture for Farm and Foreign Agricultural Services, and subsequently ruled out reelection. The office was then held by Mike Naig, serving in an acting capacity.

=== Democratic primary ===
==== Results ====
Democratic primary results
Party	Candidate	Votes	%
Democratic	Tim Gannon	148,258	99.5
Democratic	Write-ins	710	0.5
Total votes		148,968	100.0

=== Republican primary ===
- Ray Gaesser, farmer and soybean producer
- Chad Ingels
- Craig Lang, former president of the Farm Bureau
- Mike Naig, incumbent
- Dan Zumbach, state senator

==== Results ====
Republican primary results
Party	Candidate	Votes	%
Republican	Mike Naig (incumbent)	30,870	34.7
Republican	Dan Zumbach	18,938	21.3
Republican	Craig Lang	16,514	18.6
Republican	Ray Gaesser	14,437	16.2
Republican	Chad Ingels	7,915	8.9
Republican	Write-ins	210	0.3
Total votes		88,884	100.0

=== General election ===
==== Endorsements ====
Tim Gannon (D)

U.S. executive branch officials

- Barack Obama, 44th president of the United States

==== Results ====
Iowa Secretary of Agriculture election, 2018
Party	Candidate	Votes	%
Republican	Mike Naig (incumbent)	651,552	50.3
Democratic	Tim Gannon	602,916	46.6
Libertarian	Rick Stewart	38,965	3.0
Write-in		597	0.1
Total votes		1,294,030	100.0
Republican hold			

== United States House of Representatives ==
All of Iowa's four seats in the United States House of Representatives were up for election in 2018.

== Iowa General Assembly ==
The 25 odd-numbered Iowa Senate seats were up for election in 2018, as were all 100 Iowa House seats.
