= Michael Fitzgerald (Iowa politician) =

American politician

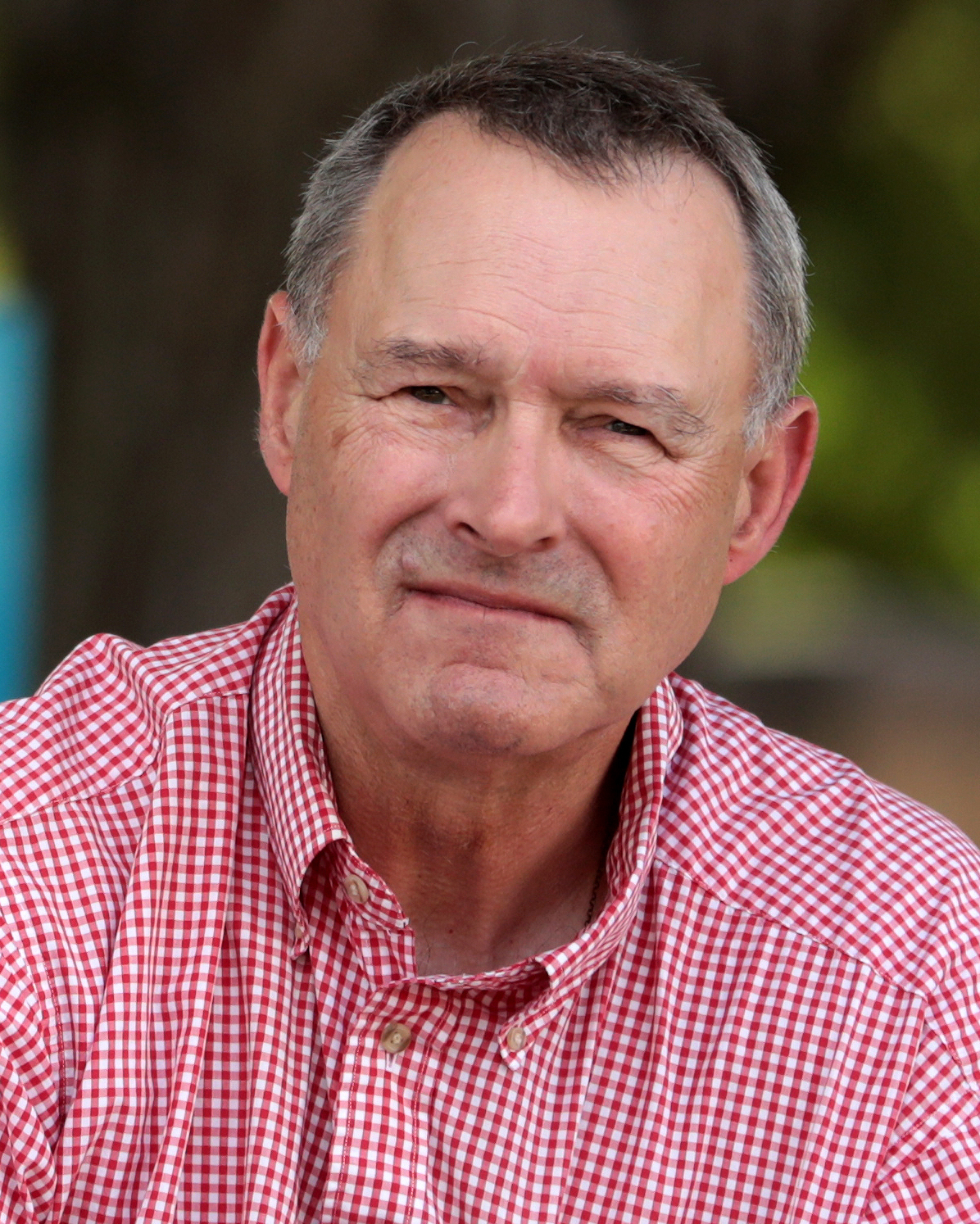
- Fitzgerald in 2019

25th Treasurer of Iowa
- In office January 4, 1983 – January 1, 2023
- Governor: Terry Branstad; Tom Vilsack; Chet Culver; Terry Branstad; Kim Reynolds
- Preceded by: Maurice E. Baringer
- Succeeded by: Roby Smith

Personal details
- Born: November 29, 1951 (age 74) Marshalltown, Iowa, U.S.
- Party: Democratic
- Children: 2
- Education: University of Iowa (BA)

Michael L. Fitzgerald (born November 29, 1951) is an American businessman and politician who served as the 25th treasurer of Iowa from 1983 to 2023. A member of the Democratic Party, he was the longest-serving state treasurer in the United States.

== Early life and early career ==
Fitzgerald was born in Marshalltown, Iowa, in 1951. He graduated from Colo Community High School in 1970 and received his bachelor's degree in business administration from the University of Iowa in 1974. Fitzgerald worked as a marketing analyst for Massey Ferguson in Des Moines for eight years before being elected State Treasurer of Iowa in 1982.

== State Treasurer (1983–2023) ==
As State Treasurer, Fitzgerald acted as Iowa's banker and chief financial officer.

He served as the administrator of Iowa's 529 plan, formerly College Savings Iowa, which is a college savings advisory service.

Fitzgerald administered the Invest in Iowa program, a series of auctions started in 1983 to invest state funds in Iowa financial institutions. The Linked Investments for Tomorrow (LIFT) program, introduced in 1986, also provided capital to Iowa entrepreneurs to create or expand their businesses.

Fitzgerald lost reelection in 2022 to Republican candidate Roby Smith. He held office for 40 years, making him the longest-serving state treasurer in the United States.

== Electoral history ==
2022 Iowa Treasurer election
Party	Candidate	Votes	%
Republican	Roby Smith	614,943	51.26%
Democratic	Michael Fitzgerald (incumbent)	584,021	48.68%
Write-in		667	0.06%
Total votes		1,199,631	100.0%
Republican gain from Democratic			

Iowa State Treasurer election, 2018
Party	Candidate	Votes	%
Democratic	Michael L. Fitzgerald (incumbent)	710,426	54.8
Republican	Jeremy Davis	553,691	42.7
Libertarian	Tim Hird	31,268	2.4
Write-in		465	0.1
Total votes		1,295,850	100.0
Democratic hold			

Iowa State Treasurer election, 2014
Party	Candidate	Votes	%
Democratic	Michael Fitzgerald (incumbent)	576,942	52.9
Republican	Sam Clovis	476,633	43.7
Libertarian	Keith Laube	36,945	3.4
n/a	Write-ins	670	0.1
Total votes		1,091,190	100.0
Democratic hold			

State Treasurer of Iowa, 2010
Party	Candidate	Vote percentage
Democratic	Michael L. Fitzgerald	53%
Republican	David D. Jamison	47%

State Treasurer of Iowa, 2006
Party	Candidate	Vote percentage
Democratic	Michael L. Fitzgerald	99%
	Write-in	1%

State Treasurer of Iowa, 2002
Party	Candidate	Vote percentage
Democratic	Michael L. Fitzgerald	55%
Republican	Matthew Whitaker	43%
Libertarian	Tim Hird	2%

State Treasurer of Iowa, 1998
Party	Candidate	Vote percentage
Democratic	Michael L. Fitzgerald	55%
Republican	Joan Fitzpatrick Bolin	43%

State Treasurer of Iowa, 1994
Party	Candidate	Vote percentage
Democratic	Michael L. Fitzgerald	54%
Republican	Jay Irwin	44%
Natural Law Party	Elizabeth Koehler	2%

State Treasurer of Iowa, 1990
Party	Candidate	Vote percentage
Democratic	Michael L. Fitzgerald	59%
Republican	Burtwin L. Day	39%
Grassroots Party	Derrick P. Grimmer	2%

State Treasurer of Iowa, 1986
Party	Candidate	Vote percentage
Democratic	Michael L. Fitzgerald	58%
Republican	John Nystrom	42%

State Treasurer of Iowa, 1982
Party	Candidate	Vote percentage
Democratic	Michael L. Fitzgerald	51%
Republican	Maurice E. Baringer (Incumbent)	48%

Fitzgerald once considered running for Governor of Iowa against Republican incumbent Terry Branstad in 2014.

Party political offices
Preceded by Bob Krause	Democratic nominee for Treasurer of Iowa; 1982, 1986, 1990, 1994, 1998, 2002, 2006, 2010, 2014, 2018, 2022	Succeeded by John Norwood
Political offices
Preceded by Maurice E. Baringer	Treasurer of Iowa; 1983–2023	Succeeded by Roby Smith
