= Bloody Run (Iowa) =

Stream in Iowa, U.S.

Coordinates: 43°02′30″N 91°10′39″W

Bloody Run is a creek tributary to the Mississippi River. It flows through Clayton County, Iowa. It enters the Mississippi in Marquette, Iowa. It has been designated as an Outstanding Iowa Water by the Iowa Department of Natural Resources, a title granted to a water body to receive stronger protection under the state's Antidegradation Rule. The creek faces the threat of pollution by manure as a result of Supreme Beef, a beef cattle feeding operation built in the Bloody Run watershed in Clayton County, housing 11,600 animals.

== Pollution ==
In late December 2016, Jon Haman and Heath Kellogg came into contact with Mike Walz, Dean Walz, and Jared Walz. They discussed the idea of a cattle feeding facility that would have anaerobic digesters; this would turn into Walz Energy, the parent company of Supreme Beef and Feeder Creek Energy.

In 2018, Chris Jones, a chemist and research engineer at the University of Iowa Institute of Hydraulic Research (IIHR), and the head of the Iowa Water Quality Information System since 2015, installed a sensing station in Bloody Run to monitor its water quality. Jones ran a university-funded water quality-focused blog from June 28, 2016, until April 2, 2023. Jones has repeatedly been threatened by Republican politicians, particularly Dan Zumbach, for his research, and left the University of Iowa on May 16, 2023, one month after his final blog post. These threats began in March the same year, when Zumbach and Tom Shipley reportedly told a lobbyist for the University of Iowa that they wished to silence Jones' blog due to its aggressive reporting on farm-related water contamination. In one blog post, Jones reported that the 30.5 million gallons of manure produced by 11,600 beef cattle contained 1.2 million pounds of nitrogen and 762,000 pounds of phosphorus. Zumbach's son-in-law is the co-owner of Supreme Beef, which lies just upstream of Jones' monitoring station.

In September 2021, the Iowa Chapter of the Sierra Club and Trout Unlimited filed a lawsuit against the Iowa Department of Natural Resources, alleging the agency improperly approved the nutrient management plan of Supreme Beef, and that the plan had incorrect calculations of how much manure could be safely applied to fields nearby the operation. On April 28, 2023, a Polk County District Court judge ruled that the DNR improperly approved the nutrient management plan and that the DNR would require Supreme Beef to resubmit a new plan. Area residents filed a formal ethics complaint with the state Senate alleging that Dan Zumbach “improperly used his position as a state senator to influence decisions by a regulatory agency.”

== See also ==
- List of rivers of Iowa
