= Bloody Run Hills =

Mountain range in Nevada, United States

- Location within Nevada

Highest point
- Elevation: 2,087 m (6,847 ft)

Geography
- Country: United States
- State: Nevada
- District: Humboldt County
- Range coordinates: 41°15′12.644″N 117°45′51.476″W
- Topo map: USGS Mud Spring Canyon

The Bloody Run Hills are a mountain range in Humboldt County, Nevada.
