= Sam Wooden =

American politician

Member of the Iowa House of Representatives from the 71st district
- Member-elect
- Assumed office January 1, 2027
- Preceded by: Lindsay James

Personal details
- Party: Democratic
- Website: Campaign website

Sam Wooden is an American politician. A member of the Democratic Party, he was elected to the Iowa House of Representatives in 2026, representing the 71st district. He succeeded fellow Democrat Lindsay James in the 2026 election. He is an attorney. He was elected president of the First Judicial Bar Association in 2025. He is also a musician.
