= Treasurer of Iowa =

American official

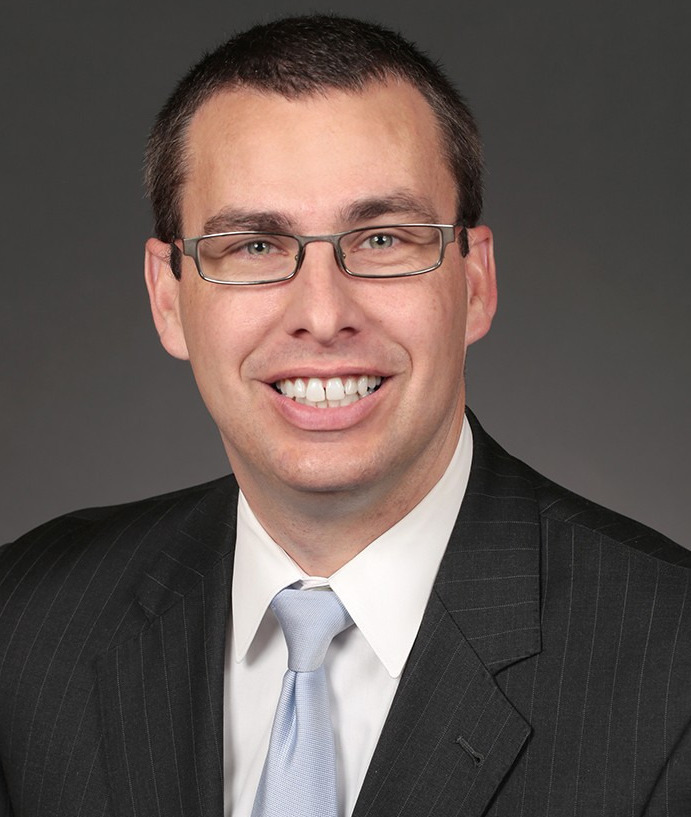
- Incumbent; Roby Smith since January 1, 2023
- Website: www.iowatreasurer.gov

The treasurer of Iowa is the state treasurer of the Government of Iowa, United States.

The office is provided for by the Constitution of Iowa, which requires that the officeholder be elected every four years, simultaneously with the rest of the state's executive branch, in presidential midterm elections.

Before statehood, Iowa was part of the Iowa Territory from 1838 to 1846. During this time, the territory had a treasurer. Treasurers of Iowa Territory, both from Iowa City in Johnson County, were Thornton Bayless from 1839 to 1840 and Morgan Reno from 1840 to 1846, before succeeding himself as Iowa's first treasurer. The incumbent has been Republican Roby Smith since 2023.

== List of treasurers of Iowa ==
No.	Image	Name	Start	End	Party	Residence
1		Morgan Reno	1846	1850	(D)	Johnson
2		Israel Kister	1850	1852	(D)	Davis
3		Martin L. Morris	1852	1859	(D)	Polk
4		John W. Jones	1859	1863	(R)	Hardin
5		William H. Holmes	1863	1867	(R)	Jones
6		Samuel E. Rankin	1867	1873	(R)	Washington
7		William Christy	1873	1877	(R)	Clarke
8		George W. Bemis	1877	1881	(R)	Buchanan
9		Edwin H. Conger	1881	1885	(R)	Dallas
10		Voltaire P. Twombly	1885	1891	(R)	Van Buren
11		Byron A. Beeson	1891	1895	(R)	Marshall
12		John Herriott	1895	1901	(R)	Guthrie
13		Gilbert S. Gilbertson	1901	1907	(R)	Winnebago
14		Willison W. Morrow	1907	1913	(R)	Union
15		William C. Brown	1913	1917	(R)	Wright
16		Edwin H. Hoyt	1917	1921	(R)	Delaware
17		William J. Burbank	1921	1925	(R)	Black Hawk
18		Raymond E. Johnson	1925	1933	(R)	Muscatine
19		Leo J. Wegman	1933	1939	(D)	Carroll
20		Willis Bagley	1939	1943	(R)	Cerro Gordo
21		John M. Grimes	1943	1951	(R)	Clarke
22		M. L. Abrahamson	1951	1965	(R)	Boone
23		Paul Franzenburg	1965	1969	(D)	Grundy
24		Maurice E. Baringer	1969	1983	(R)	Fayette
25		Michael L. Fitzgerald	1983	2023	(D)	Polk
26		Roby Smith	2023	present	(R)	Scott
