= Dan Zumbach =

American politician and farmer

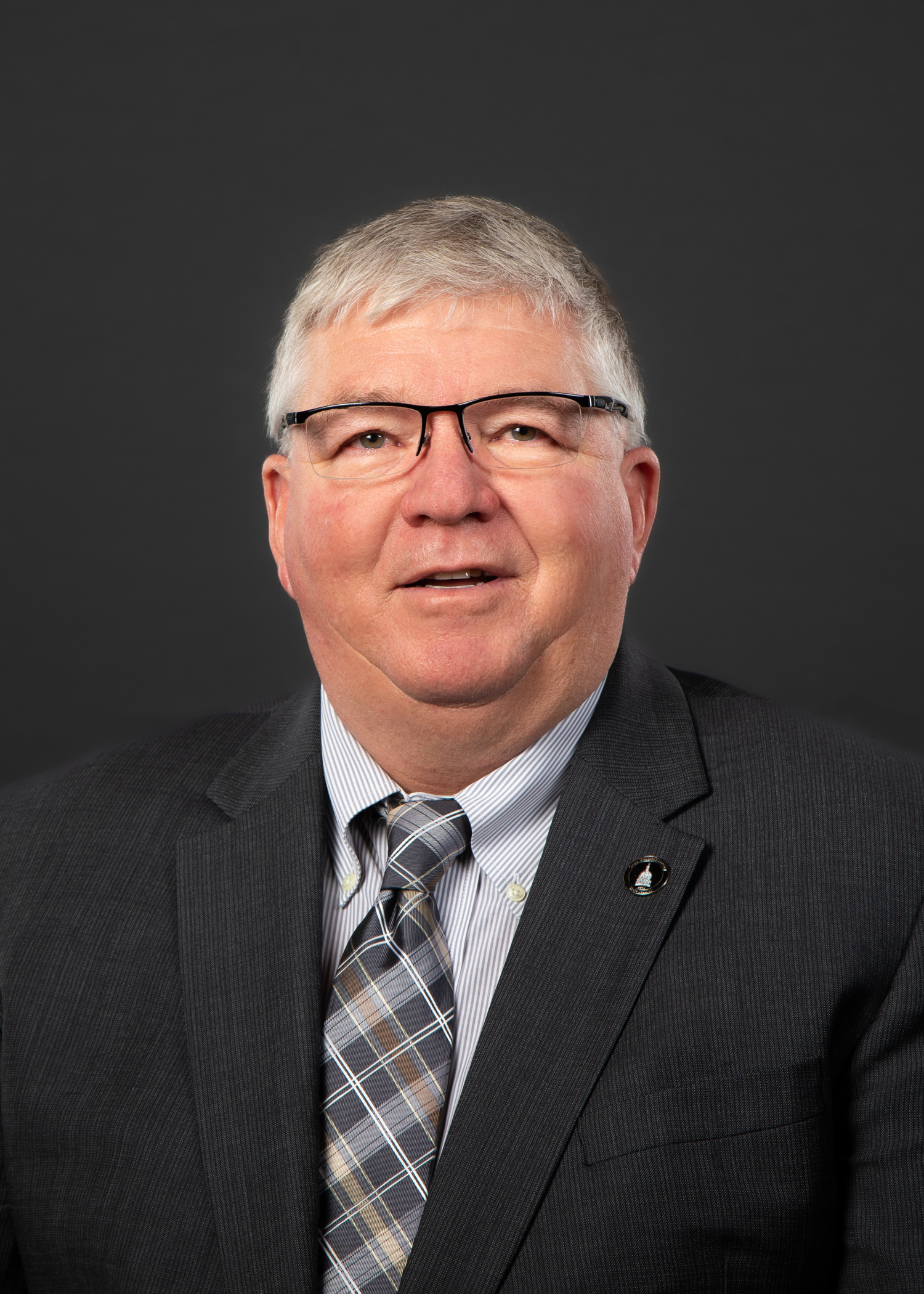

Member of the Iowa Senate from the 34th district
- Incumbent
- Assumed office January 14, 2013
- Preceded by: Joni Ernst
- Constituency: District 34 - (2023-Present); District 48 - (2013-2023)

Personal details
- Born: 1960 (age 65–66) Monticello, Iowa, U.S.
- Party: Republican
- Spouse: Michelle Zumbach
- Occupation: Farmer
- Website: Zumbach's website

Dan Zumbach (born 1960) is an American politician and farmer from the state of Iowa. A Republican, he has served in the Iowa Senate since 2013 as a member from the 34th district. He is the chair of the Senate Agriculture Committee.

== Early life ==
Zumbach was born in 1960 in Monticello, Iowa. He grew up near Ryan, Iowa, and graduated from West Delaware High School in Manchester. He is a member of the West Delaware School Board, the Delaware County Fair Board, and the Peace Lutheran Church Council. He is married to Michelle Zumbach and the couple have two sons and two daughters.

== Political career ==
Zumbach was first elected to the Iowa Senate for the 48th district in 2012 with 16,415 votes, defeating Democrat Nate Willems, to serve a term beginning on January 14, 2013. He was re-elected in 2016 with 65% of the vote, defeating Democratic opponent Scott Peterson. In 2020, he received 22,544 votes, winning re-election against Democrat Eric Green with 65.2% of the vote.

He is a member of the agriculture committee, serving as the ranking member, as well as being a member of the natural resources and environment committee and the transportation committee. He sits on the Watershed Planning Advisory Council. He was formerly a member of the all-terrain and off-road utility vehicle study committee between 2013 and 2014 and a member of the Iowa corn checkoff task force in 2014. Zumbach sponsored a bill, Senate File 2127, to restrict the installation of solar panels on land which could be used to grow corn and soybeans.

In January 2022, Zumbach faced an ethics complaint filed by members of the Committee to Save Bloody Run Creek which alleged that he had met with officials of the Iowa Department of Natural Resources in relation to a feedlot, Supreme Beef, owned by his son-in-law. The bipartisan ethics committee ruled unanimously to dismiss the complaint.

Iowa Senate
Preceded by Liz Mathis	34th District; 2023 – Present	Succeeded by Incumbent
Preceded by Joni Ernst	48th District; 2013 – 2023	Succeeded by Mark Lofgren
