= Secretary of Agriculture of Iowa =

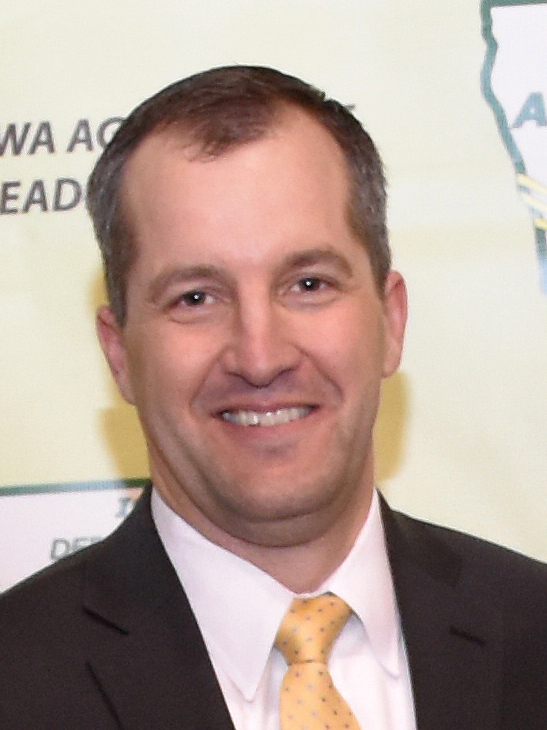
- Incumbent; Mike Naig since March 5, 2018
- Iowa Department of Agriculture and Land Stewardship
- Type: Secretary of Agriculture
- Formation: 1923
- First holder: Raymond W. Cassady

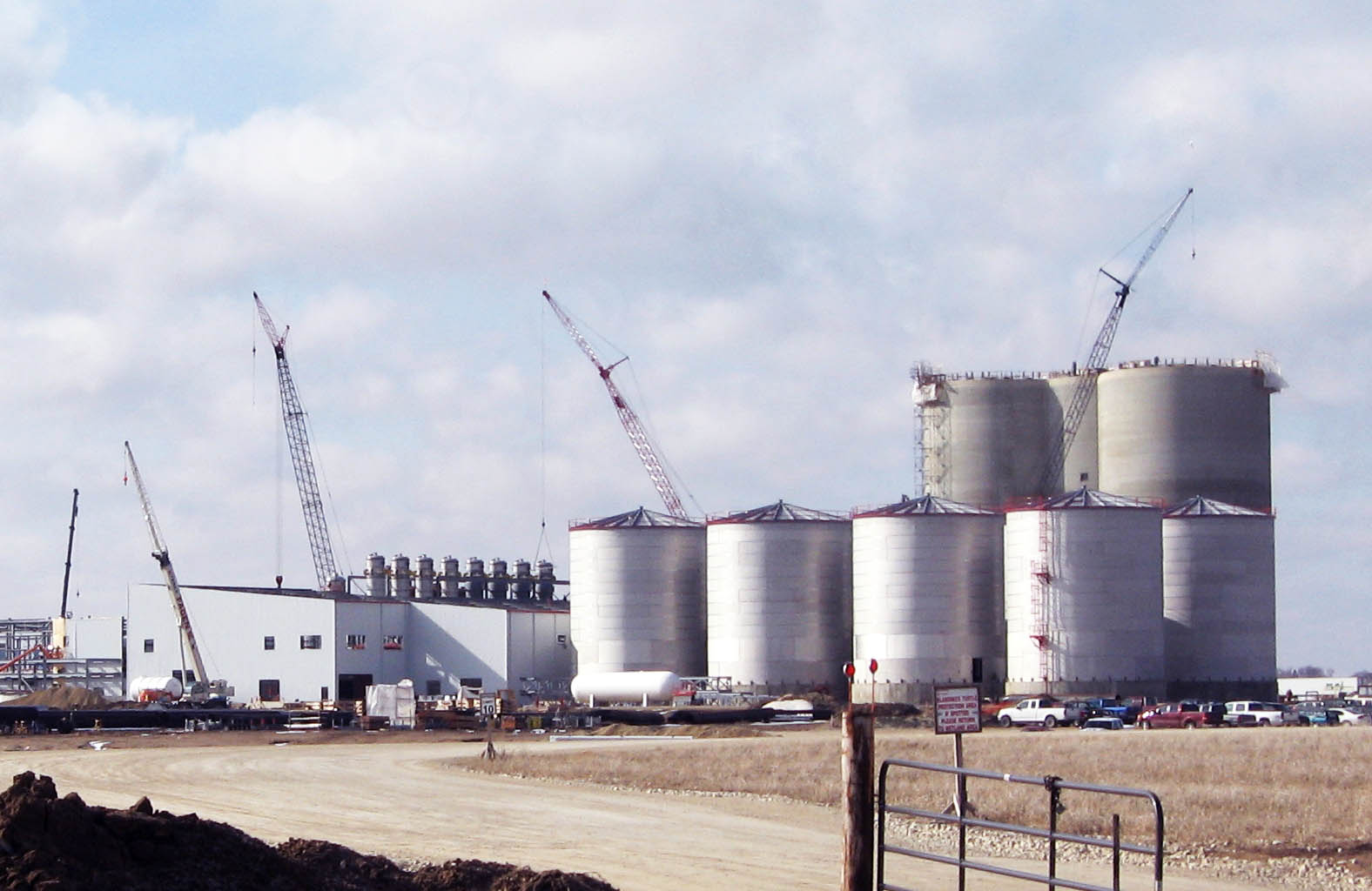
Ethanol plant under construction, Butler County, Iowa

The secretary of agriculture of Iowa is an elected position in government of the U.S. state of Iowa that was created in 1923 by the extra session of the 40th General Assembly. The secretary of agriculture heads the Iowa Department of Agriculture and Land Stewardship, which is responsible for managing land and helping farmers in the state.

== Background ==
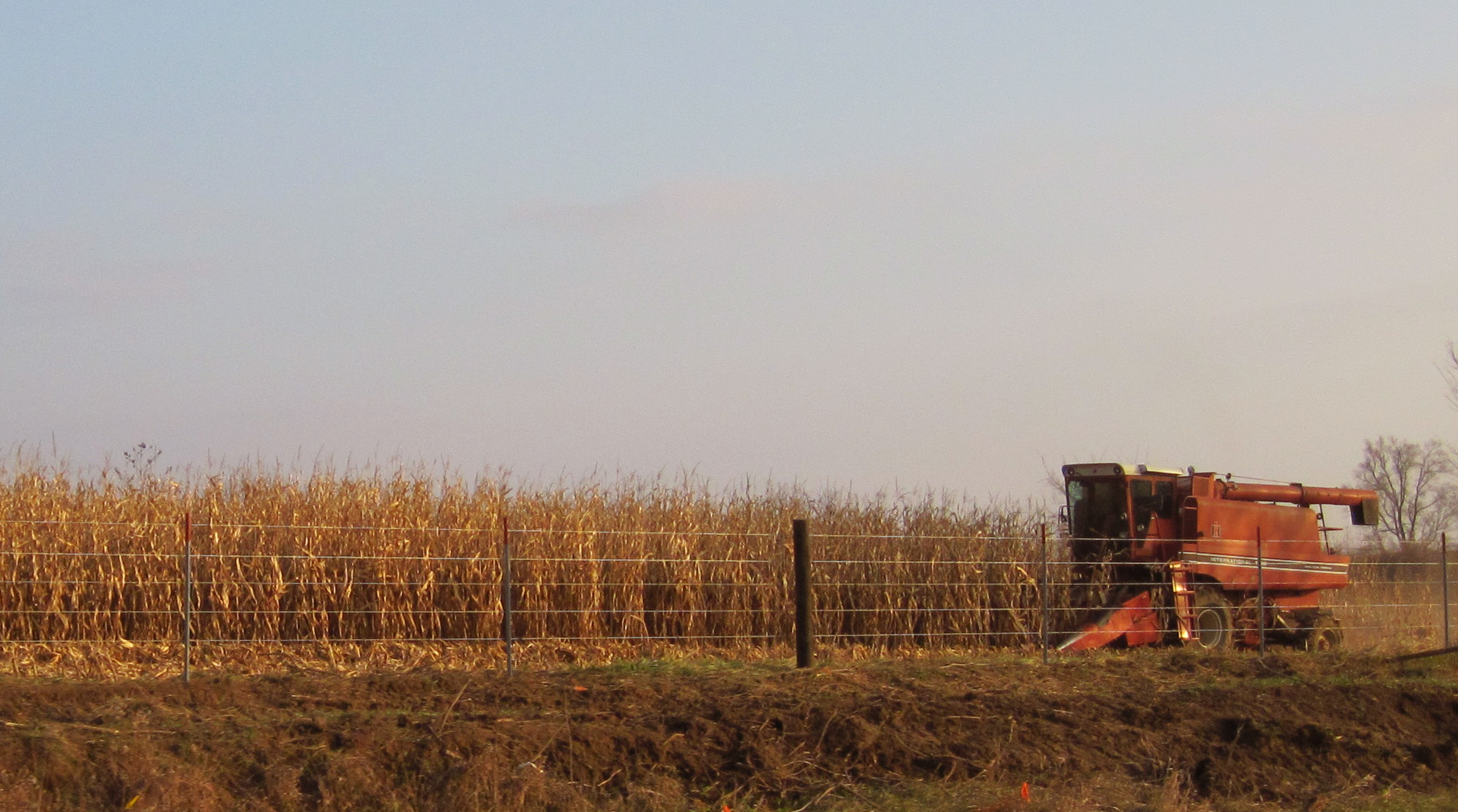
Harvesting corn during the record 2009 season in Jones County, Iowa

Directly and indirectly, agriculture has always been a major component of Iowa's economy. However, the direct production and sale of raw agricultural products contributes only about 3.5% of Iowa's gross state product.

The indirect role of agriculture in Iowa's economy can be measured in multiple ways, but its total impact, including agriculture-affiliated business, has been measured at 16.4% in terms of value added and 24.3% in terms of total output. This is lower than the economic impact in Iowa of non-farm manufacturing, which accounts for 22.4% of total value added and 26.5% of total output.

Iowa's main agricultural outputs are hogs, corn, soybeans, oats, cattle, eggs and dairy products. Iowa is the nation's largest producer of ethanol and corn. Major Iowa agricultural product processors include Cargill, Inc., Pioneer Hi-Bred International, Monsanto Company, Ajinomoto and Hy-Vee.

== List of secretaries of agriculture of Iowa ==
#	Picture	Secretary	Took office	Left office	Party	Notes
1.		Raymond W. Cassady	1923	1924	Republican	
–		R. G. Clark	1924	1924	Republican	Served only as interim Secretary of Agriculture of Iowa.
2.		Mark G. Thornburg	1924	1933	Republican	
3.		Ray Murray	1933	1937	Democratic	
4.		Thomas L. Curran	1937	1939	Democratic	
5.		Mark G. Thornburg	1939	1943	Republican	
6.		Harry D. Linn	1943	1950	Republican	
7.		Clyde Spry	1950	1961	Republican	Appointed upon resignation of Linn in June 1950.
8.		L. B. Liddy	1961	1965	Republican	Appointed upon death of Spry in June 1961.
9.		Kenneth Owen	1965	1967	Democratic	
10.		L. B. Liddy	1967	1973	Republican	
11.		Robert H. Lounsberry	1973	1987	Republican	
12.		Dale M. Cochran	1987	1999	Democratic	
13.		Patty Judge	1999	2007	Democratic	
14.		Bill Northey	2007	2018	Republican	Resigned to become U.S. Under Secretary of Agriculture for Farm and Foreign Agricultural Services.
15.		Mike Naig	2018	Incumbent	Republican	
