= 2026 Iowa elections =

A general election was held in the U.S. state of Iowa on November 3, 2026. All of Iowa's executive officers were up for election, as well as Joni Ernst's open United States Senate seat, all four of Iowa's seats in the United States House of Representatives, 25 (half) of the seats in the Iowa Senate, and all 100 seats in the Iowa House of Representatives. Primary elections were held on June 2, 2026.

As part of a nationwide wave referred to as the "blue tsunami," Republicans faced defeats throughout the state, falling to a narrow majority in the state House and losing three seats in the state Senate, as well as suffering defeats in multiple statewide offices.

== Federal ==
=== United States Senate ===
Incumbent Republican senator Joni Ernst declined to run for re-election for a third term. Ernst won in 2020 by 6 points in what was widely considered to be a toss-up race, with 50.88% of the vote.

This race received heavy media attention after Ernst made a comment when addressing a constituents concerns about Medicaid, stating "We are all going to die", and making a sarcastic apology for the comment at a cemetery. This comment spearheaded the race into the spotlight, with Democrats targeting it as a potential flip.

Shortly after Ernst's announcement not to seek re-election, U.S. House Rep. Ashley Hinson of Iowa's 2nd Congressional district announced her intention to run. She received the nomination, but narrowly lost the general election to the Democratic nominee, state representative Josh Turek.

=== United States House of Representatives ===
All of Iowa's four seats in the United States House of Representatives were up for election in 2026. While all four were previously held by Republicans, only the seat in Iowa's 4th congressional district remained so after the election. The other three all flipped to the Democrats.

== Executive ==
=== Governor and lieutenant governor ===
Incumbent Republican governor Kim Reynolds declined to run for re-election and seek a third term, which the Iowa state constitution would allow her to do if she had wanted. Reynolds won in 2022 with 58.04% of the vote. Due to the governorship being open, this race has received a fair bit of attention.

In Iowa, nominees for Lieutenant Governor are chosen at party conventions. They then run on a ticket with the gubernatorial nominee. The nominees then pick who they would want to run on the ticket with them.

The lone Democrat holding statewide office in Iowa before the election, State auditor Rob Sand, received the Democratic nomination. He selected Crawford County supervisor and 2022 U.S. Senate candidate Dave Muhlbauer as his running mate. On the Republican side, U.S. Representative from Iowa's 4th Congressional district Randy Feenstra was initially the favorite for the republican nomination, but Zach Lahn gained momentum late in the race and secured the nomination, despite controversy surrounding his residency. Lahn selected state representative from the 76th district Derek Wulf as his running mate.

On November 3, Sand defeated Lahn by eleven points to become the first Democratic governor in the state since Chet Culver lost reelection in 2010.

=== Attorney general ===
Incumbent Republican Brenna Bird won in 2022, after defeating then-incumbent Democratic attorney general Tom Miller, who had served in the position off-and-on since 1979 and was running for his 11th term. Bird defeated Miller with 50.8% in 2022.

Bird ran for re-election in 2026 with only one Democratic challenger in former Iowa house representative Nathan Willems. Despite receiving very little national attention, Willems upset Bird in a narrow race.

=== Secretary of state ===
Incumbent Republican secretary of state Paul Pate announced his intention to run for a 5th term in 2026. He won in 2022 with 60.0% of the vote. He successfully fended off the Democratic challenger, Navy veteran Ryan Peterman, in one of the few midterm Republican victories in Iowa.

=== Treasurer ===
Incumbent Republican state treasurer, Roby Smith, won in 2022 after defeating longtime Democratic incumbent Michael Fitzgerald, who had served in the position consecutively since 1983. and was running for his eleventh term in office. Smith defeated Fitzgerald with 51.3% of the vote.

In December 2025, Smith declared his intent to run for re-election to a second term. The Democratic nominee was John Norwood. The New York Times has called this race for Smith; however, the margin remains within one point.

=== Auditor ===
Incumbent Democratic state auditor, Rob Sand, was the sole Democrat to win statewide in 2022, defeating businessman Todd Halbur. Sand won in 2022 with 50.09% of the vote. With Sand retiring to run for governor, attorney Taylor Wettach ran unopposed in the Democratic primary and defeated his Republican opponent, Lt. Governor Chris Cournoyer, in the general election.

=== Secretary of Agriculture ===
Incumbent Republican Secretary of Agriculture, Mike Naig, won in 2022 with 61.1% of the vote, being the best performing Republican nominee that year. Amidst the hostile national climate of 2026, Naig once again overperformed his fellows throughout the state, defeating Democrat Chris Jones in the general election by nearly six percentage points.

== Legislature ==
=== Iowa General Assembly ===
Before the election, Republicans had a supermajority in the state house and a majority in the state senate. The Republican senate majority shrank slightly, and they lost their supermajority in the house.
