= 2026 Iowa gubernatorial election =

- November 3, 2026

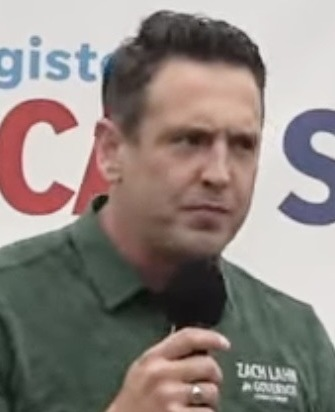
Nominee	Rob Sand	Zach Lahn
Party	Democratic	Republican
Running mate	Dave Muhlbauer	Derek Wulf
Popular vote	759,705	608,231
Percentage	55.54%	44.46%
- Sand: 40–50% 50–60% 60–70% 70–80% 80–90% >90% Lahn: 40–50% 50–60% 60–70% 70–80% 80–90% >90%
Governor before election
Kim Reynolds
Republican
Elected Governor
Rob Sand
Democratic

The 2026 Iowa gubernatorial election was held on November 3, 2026, to elect the governor of Iowa. Democratic state auditor Rob Sand won the election against Republican businessman Zach Lahn. Republican incumbent Kim Reynolds did not seek a third full term.

Primary elections were held on June 2, 2026. In the Republican primary, Representative Randy Feenstra emerged as the frontrunner after being endorsed by President Donald Trump, but Lahn won the nomination in an upset with 37.65% of the vote. Sand was the only candidate to qualify for the ballot in the Democratic primary.

Leading up to the election, Rob Sand was the only Democrat holding statewide elected office in Iowa, as the state has trended reliably red in recent years. With the incumbent's retirement and Sand's entry, pollsters considered the governor's mansion a potential offensive opportunity for Democrats. Aided by his personal popularity, questions about his opponent's residency, as well as a national environment that was expected to favor his party, Sand led his opponent in the vast majority of pre-election polling, oftentimes outside the margin of error. Come election night, Rob Sand won, defeating Zach Lahn by an 11% margin. This was the first open gubernatorial election in Iowa since 2006 and the first to be held at the same time as the open Senate election since 1968. This was the first time since 2006 that Democrats won the governorship in Iowa. Sand won by the largest margin for a Democratic Iowa gubernatorial candidate since 1964.

== Background ==
Iowa is considered to be a moderate-to-strong red state, with both chambers of its state legislature controlled by the Republican Party. However, in special elections in 2025, Iowa Republicans lost their supermajority in the Iowa Senate. Republicans still maintain their supermajority in the Iowa House of Representatives that they won in 2024. The last time the Democratic Party won a gubernatorial election in Iowa was in 2006. All four members of the U.S. House of Representatives from Iowa have been Republicans since 2022 and Republicans had won all U.S. Senate elections in Iowa since 2010, making Iowa's congressional delegation entirely Republican. In Presidential Elections, Iowa voted for Republican President Donald Trump in his nationwide-win in 2016, loss in 2020, and win again in 2024, with Trump's and the Republican Party's vote-share increasing in Iowa in every subsequent election. Sand, a Democrat, won statewide election in 2022 as state auditor by just 2,893 votes.

== Republican primary ==
=== Candidates ===
==== Nominee ====
- Zach Lahn
  - Running mate: Derek Wulf, state representative from the 76th district (2023–present)

==== Eliminated in primary ====
- Eddie Andrews, state representative from the 43rd district (2021–present)
- Randy Feenstra, U.S. representative from Iowa's 4th congressional district (2021–present)
- Brad Sherman, former state representative from the 91st district (2023–2025)
- Adam Steen, former director of the Iowa Department of Administrative Services (2021–2025)

==== Declined ====
- Brenna Bird, attorney general of Iowa (2023–present) (ran for re-election)
- Mike Bousselot, state senator from the 21st district (2023–present) (ran for re-election; later withdrew)
- Chris Cournoyer, lieutenant governor of Iowa (2024–present) (ran for state auditor; endorsed Feenstra)
- Pat Grassley, speaker of the Iowa House of Representatives (2020–present) from the 57th district (2007–present) and grandson of U.S. Senator Chuck Grassley (ran for re-election)
- Ashley Hinson, U.S. representative from Iowa's 2nd congressional district (2021–present) (ran for U.S. Senate)
- Bobby Kaufmann, state representative from the 82nd district (2013–present) (ran for re-election)
- Kari Lake, senior advisor to the U.S. Agency for Global Media (2025–present) and nominee for governor of Arizona in 2022 and U.S. senator in 2024
- Mariannette Miller-Meeks, U.S. representative from Iowa's 1st congressional district (2021–present) (ran for re-election; endorsed Feenstra)
- Mike Naig, Iowa secretary of agriculture (2018–present) (ran for re-election; endorsed Feenstra)
- Zach Nunn, U.S. representative from Iowa's 3rd congressional district (2023–present) (ran for re-election)
- Kim Reynolds, incumbent governor (2017–present) (declined to endorse)
- Bob Vander Plaats, president and CEO of The Family Leader, nominee for lieutenant governor in 2006, and candidate for governor in 2002, 2006, and 2010 (endorsed Steen)

=== Endorsements ===
Randy Feenstra

Executive branch officials

- Terry Branstad, former ambassador to China (2017–2020) and former governor of Iowa (1983–1999, 2011–2017) (previously endorsed Bousselot)
- Donald Trump, president of the United States (2017–2021, 2025–present)

U.S. senators

- Joni Ernst, Iowa (2015–present)

U.S. representatives

- Mariannette Miller-Meeks, IA-1 (2021–present)

Statewide officials

- Chris Cournoyer, lieutenant governor of Iowa (2024–present)
- Mike Naig, Iowa secretary of agriculture (2018–present)
- Matt Schultz, former Iowa secretary of state (2011–2015)
- Roby Smith, state treasurer of Iowa (2023–present)

State legislators

- Craig Johnson, HD-67 (2023–present)
- Carrie Koelker, SD-33 (2019–present)
- Ken Rozenboom, president pro tempore of the Iowa Senate (2025–present) from SD-19 (2013–present)
- Brent Siegrist, HD-19 (2021–present), former HD-84 (1985–2003)
- John Wills, speaker pro tempore of the Iowa House of Representatives (2020–present) from HD-10 (2015–present)
- 18 other state legislators
Zach Lahn

U.S. representatives

- Steve King, former IA-4 (2003–2021)

Individuals

- Rob Schneider, actor and comedian (Independent)

Organizations

- MAHA Action
- Steak 'n Shake
- Turning Point Action
Brad Sherman

Executive branch officials

- Sam Clovis, former senior White House advisor to the Department of Agriculture (2017–2018)

State legislators

- Kevin Alons, SD-07 (2023–present)
- Doug Campbell, SD-30 (2025–present)
- Jim Carlin, former SD-03 (2017–2023)
- Mark Cisneros, HD-96 (2021–present)
- Dennis Guth, SD-28 (2013–present)
- Judd Lawler, HD-91 (2025–present)
- Anne Osmundson, former HD-64 (2019–2025)
- Sandy Salmon, SD-29 (2023–present)
- Luana Stoltenberg, former HD-81 (2023–2025)
Adam Steen

State legislators

- Dean Fisher, HD-53 (2013–present)
- Charlie McClintock, SD-42 (2023–present)
- Mike Pike, SD-20 (2025–present)
- Henry Stone, HD-09 (2023–present)

Individuals

- Steve Deace, conservative talk show host
- Dan Gable, former freestyle wrestler
- Bob Vander Plaats, president and CEO of The Family Leader

Organizations

- The Family Leader
Mike Bousselot (declined)

Executive branch officials

- ~~Terry Branstad, former ambassador to China (2017–2020) and former governor of Iowa (1983–1999, 2011–2017)~~ (later endorsed Feenstra)
Declined to endorse

Statewide officials

- Kim Reynolds, governor of Iowa (2017–present)

Newspapers

- Des Moines Register

=== Debates ===
2026 Iowa Republican gubernatorial primary debates
No.	Date	Host	Moderator	Link	Participants				
P Participant A Absent N Non-invitee I Invitee W Withdrawn									
P Participant A Absent N Non-invitee I Invitee W Withdrawn					Feenstra	Lahn	Sherman	Steen	Andrews
1	April 28, 2026	Iowa PBS	Kay Henderson	PBS	A	A	P	P	P
2	May 19, 2026	KCCI	Amanda Rooker; Dave Price	KCCI	A	P	P	P	P

=== Polling ===
Poll source	Date(s) administered	Sample size (Note: Key: A – all adults RV – registered voters LV – likely voters V – unclear)	Margin of error	Eddie Andrews	Randy Feenstra	Zach Lahn	Brad Sherman	Adam Steen	Undecided
JMC Analytics (R)	May 27–28, 2026	550 (A)	± 4.2%	4%	22%	24%	8%	15%	27%
JMC Analytics (R)	May 27–28, 2026	550 (A)	± 4.2%	4%	24%	27%	9%	16%	19%
Victory Enterprises (R) (Note: Poll sponsored by Feenstra's campaign)	April 14–15, 2026	500 (LV)	± 4.4%	5%	41%	8%	5%	9%	32%

=== Results ===
County results Lahn: 30–40%; 40–50%; 50–60%; Feenstra: 30–40%; 40–50%; 50–60%; Steen: 30–40%; Sherman: 30–40%

Congressional district results Lahn: 30–40%; Feenstra: 30–40%; 40–50%

Republican primary results
Party	Candidate	Votes	%
Republican	Zach Lahn	80,765	37.7
Republican	Randy Feenstra	79,113	36.9
Republican	Adam Steen	31,087	14.5
Republican	Brad Sherman	15,076	7.0
Republican	Eddie Andrews	7,694	3.6
Write-in		794	0.4
Total votes		214,529	100.0

== Democratic primary ==
=== Candidates ===
==== Nominee ====
- Rob Sand, Iowa auditor of state (2019–present)
  - Running mate: Dave Muhlbauer, Crawford County supervisor (2017–2021, 2023–present) and candidate for U.S. Senate in 2022

==== Disqualified ====
- Julie Stauch, business development professional and former Iowa political director for the Pete Buttigieg 2020 presidential campaign

=== Endorsements ===
Rob Sand

Statewide officials

- Tim Walz, governor of Minnesota (2019–present)

Labor unions

- AFSCME Council 61
- Iowa Federation of Labor, AFL-CIO
- Iowa State Education Association, NEA
- LIUNA 177
- SEIU Healthcare Minnesota & Iowa
- United Auto Workers

Organizations

- Defend The Vote
- End Citizens United

=== Results ===
Democratic primary results
Party	Candidate	Votes	%
Democratic	Rob Sand	189,442	99.6
Write-in		751	0.4
Total votes		190,193	100.0

== Libertarian primary ==
=== Candidates ===
On June 2, the Gluba campaign submitted over 8,000 signatures to the Iowa Secretary of State, satisfying the 3,500 signature requirement to qualify for the ballot. However, he later got disqualified from the ballot as he did not follow the proper legal procedures when trying to substitute his running mate.

==== Disqualified ====
- Nicholas Gluba, Lone Tree city councilor and nominee for Iowa's 1st congressional district in 2024

== Independents ==
=== Candidates ===
==== Did not qualify ====
- Sondra Wilson, pre-law student (previously ran as a Democrat)

== General election ==
=== Campaign ===
Though originally from Iowa, Zach Lahn faced scrutiny following reporting by The Des Moines Register that he lived in Kansas until 2023, when he allegedly returned to Iowa. Lahn registered to vote in Iowa on October 17, 2024, ahead of the 2024 election. The newspaper later reported that flight records indicated Lahn spent 75 nights in Wichita, Kansas, between October 2025 and spring 2026, frequently traveling there by private plane. Lahn said the trips were related to custody arrangements involving his children, who live in Kansas.

Sand campaigning in Tama County.

Rob Sand criticized Lahn as a "part-time Iowan" and a carpetbagger, arguing that his frequent travel to Kansas conflicted with his "Iowa First" campaign message. Sand, meanwhile, has faced criticism from Governor Kim Reynolds and other state Republicans, who have accused him of using high-profile audits and allegations of fraud to bolster his political profile.

In early September, The Des Moines Register reported that the Black Hawk County Sheriff's Office was investigating Lahn's running mate, Wulf, for theft and fraud in relation to accusations that Wulf had misled lenders and business associates about his finances.

=== Predictions ===
Source	Ranking	As of
The Cook Political Report	Lean D (flip)	October 29, 2026
Decision Desk HQ	Lean D (flip)	November 3, 2026
Fox News	Lean D (flip)	November 1, 2026
Inside Elections	Lean D (flip)	October 29, 2026
NBC News	Lean D (flip)	November 3, 2026
RealClearPolitics	Lean D (flip)	November 1, 2026
Sabato's Crystal Ball	Lean D (flip)	November 2, 2026
Silver Bulletin	Likely D (flip)	November 3, 2026

=== Post-primary endorsements ===
Zach Lahn (R)

Executive branch officials

- Terry Branstad, former ambassador to China (2017–2020) and former governor of Iowa (1983–1999, 2011–2017)
- Robert F. Kennedy Jr., secretary of health and human services (2025–present) (Independent)
- Donald Trump, president of the United States (2017–2021, 2025–present)
- JD Vance, vice president of the United States (2025–present)

U.S. senators

- Chuck Grassley, president pro tempore (2019–2021, 2025–present) from Iowa (1981–present)
- Rand Paul, Kentucky (2011–present)

U.S. representatives

- Randy Feenstra, IA-4 (2021–present) and primary gubernatorial candidate
- Ashley Hinson, IA-2 (2021–present)
- Mike Johnson, speaker of the House (2023–present) from LA-4 (2017–present)
- Mariannette Miller-Meeks, IA-1 (2021–present)
- Ron Paul, former TX-14 (1976–2013)

Statewide officials

- Mike Naig, Iowa secretary of agriculture (2018–present)
- Paul Pate, Iowa secretary of state (1995–1999, 2015–present)
- Kim Reynolds, governor of Iowa (2017–present)
- Adam Steen, former director of the Iowa Department of Administrative Services (2021–2025) and primary gubernatorial candidate

State legislators

- Bill Gustoff, HD-40 (2023–present)
- Bobby Kaufmann, majority leader of the Iowa House of Representatives (2025–present) from HD-82 (2013–present)
- Jeff Kaufmann, former HD-79 (2005–2013) and chair of the Iowa GOP (2014–present)
- Joe Mitchell, former HD-84 (2019–2023)
- Derek Wulf, HD-76 (2023–present) (candidate's running mate)

Individuals

- Steve Deace, conservative talk show host
- James Fishback, investor and political candidate
- Nick Fuentes, far-right political activist
- Benny Johnson, conservative commentator
- Erika Kirk, CEO of Turning Point USA
- Bob Vander Plaats, president and CEO of The Family Leader

Organizations

- American Conservation Coalition
- MAHA PAC
- NRA Political Victory Fund
- Susan B. Anthony Pro-Life America
- The Family Leader

Political parties

- Iowa Republican Party
Rob Sand (D)

Executive branch officials

- Pete Buttigieg, former secretary of transportation (2021–2025)
- Tom Vilsack, former secretary of agriculture (2009–2017, 2021–2025) and former governor of Iowa (1999–2007)

U.S. senators

- Andy Kim, New Jersey (2024–present)

Statewide officials

- Andy Beshear, governor of Kentucky (2019–present)
- Patty Judge, former lieutenant governor of Iowa (2007–2011)
- Laura Kelly, governor of Kansas (2019–present)
- Tom Miller, former attorney general of Iowa (1979–1991, 1995–2023)
- Gavin Newsom, governor of California (2019–present)
- JB Pritzker, governor of Illinois (2019–present)

State legislators

- Walt Tomenga, former HD-69 (2005–2009) (Republican)

Local officials

- Dave Muhlbauer, Crawford County supervisor (2017–2021, 2023–present) (candidate's running mate)
- Matt Walsh, former mayor of Council Bluffs (2014–2025) (Republican)

Individuals

- Christie Vilsack, former first lady of Iowa (1999–2007)

Labor unions

- Iowa Farmers Union

Newspapers

- The Des Moines Register
- The Gazette

Political parties

- Iowa Democratic Party
Declined to endorse

Organizations

- Iowa Farm Bureau

=== Fundraising ===
Campaign finance reports as of July 14, 2026
Candidate	Raised	Spent
Zach Lahn (R)	$1,218,702	$3,060,944
Rob Sand (D)	$19,860,206	$19,860,206
Source: Transparency USA

=== Debates ===
2026 Iowa gubernatorial election debates
No.	Date	Host	Moderators	Link	Participants	
P Participant A Absent N Non-invitee I Invitee W Withdrawn						
P Participant A Absent N Non-invitee I Invitee W Withdrawn					Rob Sand	Zach Lahn
1	October 6, 2026	KWQC and St. Ambrose University	William Ingalls, Marcia Lense and Matt Christensen	KCRG	P	P
2	October 14, 2026	KTIV	Matt Breen, Dave Price and Justin Rust	KTIV	P	P
3	October 21, 2026 (Note: Rob Sand withdrew from the scheduled debate following the death of his brother-in-law. The debate was set to be re-scheduled to a later date, but later did not go ahead.)	Iowa PBS	Kay Henderson	Iowa PBS	W	W
4	October 27, 2026	KCRG and The Gazette	Unknown	KCRG	P	P

=== Polling ===
Aggregate polls

Source of poll aggregation	Dates administered	Dates updated	Zach Lahn (R)	Rob Sand (D)	Other/ Undecided (Note: Calculated by taking the difference of 100% and all other candidates combined.)	Margin
270toWin	October 8 – November 1, 2026	November 2, 2026	44.6%	51.6%	3.8%	Sand +7.0%
Decision Desk HQ	through November 1, 2026	November 2, 2026	45.1%	51.3%	3.6%	Sand +6.2%
FiftyPlusOne	through November 2, 2026	November 2, 2026	44.3%	52.0%	3.7%	Sand +7.7%
RealClearPolitics	October 8 – November 1, 2026	November 2, 2026	44.4%	51.9%	3.7%	Sand +7.5%
Silver Bulletin	through November 1, 2026	November 2, 2026	44.5%	51.8%	3.7%	Sand +7.3%
Average			44.6%	51.7%	3.7%	Sand +7.1%

Poll source	Date(s) administered	Sample size	Margin of error	Zach Lahn (R)	Rob Sand (D)	Other	Undecided
AtlasIntel	October 28 – November 1, 2026	1,219 (LV)	± 3.0%	44%	54%	2%	0%
New York Times/Siena University	October 26 – November 1, 2026	705 (LV)	± 4.7%	43%	51%	0%	6%
Rasmussen Reports (R)	October 27–31, 2026	901 (LV)	± 3.0%	45%	50%	0%	5%
YouGov	October 26–29, 2026	2,020 (LV)	± 3.1%	46%	53%	0%	0%
co/efficient (R)	October 28, 2026	1,020 (LV)	± 3.1%	45%	50%	—	5%
Echelon Insights (R) (Note: Poll conducted for NetChoice)	October 16–23, 2026	403 (LV)	± 6.5%	46%	50%	—	3%
co/efficient (R)	October 15–19, 2026	678 (LV)	± 3.3%	45%	49%	—	6%
GS Strategy Group (R)/ New River Strategies (D) (Note: Poll sponsored by The Cook Political Report.)	October 9–13, 2026	602 (LV)	—	43%	54%	—	3%
NPA Polling	October 8–12, 2026	678 (LV)	± 3.8%	45%	50%	—	5%
YouGov	October 6–12, 2026	2,245 (LV)	± 3.1%	44%	50%	—	6%
Marist University	October 8–11, 2026	— (LV)	± 6.6%	45%	52%	2% (Note: "Another party's candidate" with 1%; "No response" with 1%)	2%
Marist University	October 8–11, 2026	1,100 (RV)	± 4.5%	43%	54%	1% (Note: ”Another party’s candidate” with 1%)	2%
Emerson College (Note: Poll sponsored by Nexstar Media Group)	October 5–6, 2026	650 (LV)	± 3.8%	45%	49%	2% (Note: Thomas Laehn (L) with 2%)	6%
SSRS (Note: Poll conducted for CNN)	September 29 – October 5, 2026	801 (LV)	± 4.2%	42%	51%	7% (Note: "Neither" with 5%; "Other" with 2%)	—
Suffolk University	October 1–4, 2026	500 (LV)	± 4.4%	43%	55%	—	2%
New York Times/Siena University	September 22 – October 1, 2026	606 (LV)	± 4.6%	41%	52%	—	7%
Beacon Research (D)/ Shaw & Co. Research (R) (Note: Poll conducted for Fox News)	September 24–28, 2026	1,008 (LV)	± 3.0%	44%	53%	—	3%
Beacon Research (D)/ Shaw & Co. Research (R)	September 24–28, 2026	1,204 (RV)	± 2.5%	43%	53%	1%	3%
Marist University	September 17–20, 2026	1,050 (RV)	± 4.4%	42%	54%	2%	2%
co/efficient (R)	September 14–16, 2026	831 (LV)	± 3.4%	42%	46%	–	12%
Cygnal (R) (Note: Poll sponsored by the Iowans for Tax Relief Foundation)	September 9–11, 2026	500 (LV)	± 4.4%	44%	48%	—	8%
YouGov	September 3–8, 2026	2,169 (RV)	± 3.5%	39%	50%	1% (Note: "I will not vote in this race" with 1%)	10%
YouGov	September 3–8, 2026	2,041 (LV)	± 3.5%	41%	51%	—	8%
Emerson College	August 31 – September 1, 2026	750 (LV)	± 3.6%	46%	49%	—	6%
Suffolk University	August 20–23, 2026	500 (LV)	± 4.4%	44%	48%	—	8%
Emerson College	August 2–4, 2026	712 (LV)	± 3.7%	43%	48%	2% (Note: "Someone else" with 2%)	7%
Beacon Research (D)/ Shaw & Co. Research (R)	June 23–27, 2026	1,003 (RV)	± 3.0%	44%	53%	—	3%
New York Times/ Siena University	June 15–27, 2026	600 (LV)	± 4.7%	47%	48%	—	5%
Cygnal (R)	June 16–19, 2026	600 (LV)	± 4.0%	43%	48%	—	9%

Hypothetical polling

Randy Feenstra vs. Rob Sand

Poll source	Date(s) administered	Sample size	Margin of error	Randy Feenstra (R)	Rob Sand (D)	Undecided
Echelon Insights	April 3–9, 2026	377 (LV)	± 6.6%	39%	51%	10%
GBAO (D) (Note: Poll sponsored by Josh Turek's campaign, who is a Democratic candidate in the Iowa U.S. Senate election)	March 10–16, 2026	1,200 (LV)	± 2.8%	42%	50%	8%
Z to A Research (D)	October 9–13, 2025	1,351 (LV)	± 2.7%	43%	45%	12%

=== Results ===
2026 Iowa gubernatorial election
Party	Candidate	Votes	%	±%
Democratic	Rob Sand; Dave Muhlbauer	759,705	55.54	+16.5
Republican	Zach Lahn; Derek Wulf	608,231	44.46	–13.5
Write-in				
Total votes		1,367,936	100.0	
Democratic gain from Republican				

Counties that flipped from Republican to Democratic

- Black Hawk (largest municipality: Waterloo)
- Boone (largest municipality: Boone)
- Bremer (largest municipality: Waverly)
- Buchanan (largest municipality: Independence)
- Cedar (largest municipality: Tipton)
- Cerro Gordo (largest municipality: Mason City)
- Clinton (largest municipality: Clinton)
- Dallas (largest municipality: Waukee)
- Des Moines (largest municipality: Burlington)
- Dubuque (largest municipality: Dubuque)
- Jasper (largest municipality: Newton)
- Jefferson (largest municipality: Fairfield)
- Lee (largest municipality: Fort Madison)
- Marshall (largest municipality: Marshalltown)
- Muscatine (largest municipality: Muscatine)
- Poweshiek (largest municipality: Grinnell)
- Scott (largest municipality: Davenport)
- Tama (largest municipality: Tama)
- Warren (largest municipality: Indianola)
- Winneshiek (largest municipality: Decorah)
- Woodbury (largest municipality: Sioux City)

==== By congressional district ====
Sand won three congressional districts, while Lahn won one.

District	Sand	Lahn	Elected Representative
1st	57.60%	42.40%	Mariannette Miller-Meeks (119th Congress)
1st	57.60%	42.40%	Christina Bohannan (120th Congress)
2nd	57.10%	42.90%	Ashley Hinson (119th Congress)
2nd	57.10%	42.90%	Lindsay James (120th Congress)
3rd	60.49%	39.51%	Zach Nunn (119th Congress)
3rd	60.49%	39.51%	Sarah Trone Garriott (120th Congress)
4th	45.66%	54.34%	Randy Feenstra (119th Congress)
4th	45.66%	54.34%	Chris McGowan (120th Congress)

== Analysis ==
=== Exit poll ===
2026 Iowa gubernatorial election (CNN)
Demographic subgroup	Sand	Lahn	% of total vote
Ideology
Liberals	98	2	22
Moderates	74	26	39
Conservatives	13	86	39
Party
Democrats	98	2	28
Republicans	14	86	37
Independents	65	34	35
Donald Trump job approval
Approve	9	91	41
Disapprove	89	10	57
2024 presidential vote
Kamala Harris	98	2	42
Donald Trump	16	83	49
Another candidate	74	20	2
Did not vote	75	25	5
Gender
Men	49	50	48
Women	60	39	51
Income
$100,000 or more	56	44	38
$50,000-$99,999	53	47	34
Less than $50,000	59	41	27
Race/ethnicity
White	54	45	91
Latino	65	34	3
White born-again or evangelical Christian?
Yes	25	75	24
No	65	34	76
Race by gender
White men	48	51	44
White women	59	40	46
All other voters	62	36	9
Age
18–29 years old	72	28	11
30–44 years old	59	40	20
45–64 years old	50	49	34
65 and older	53	47	36
Area type
Urban	71	28	16
Suburban	64	36	28
Rural	47	53	55
Education
College graduate	62	38	38
No college degree	51	48	62
Education by race
White college graduates	62	38	35
Non-white college graduates	67	32	3
Whites without college	50	50	56
Non-whites without college	64	36	6
Education by gender and race
White women with college degrees	66	34	19
White women without college degrees	55	44	27
White men with college degrees	56	43	16
White men without college degrees	44	55	28
Voters of color	65	34	10
Educational attainment
Advanced degree	70	30	13
Bachelor's degree	58	42	24
Associate's degree	49	50	16
Some college	51	48	19
Never attended college	53	46	27

== See also ==
- 2026 United States elections
- 2026 Iowa elections
- 2026 United States Senate election in Iowa

== Notes ==
Partisan and media clients
