= Rod Roberts =

Rod Roberts may refer to:

- Rod Roberts (American politician)
- Rod Roberts (Australian politician)
