= 2022 Iowa State Auditor election =

- November 8, 2022

Candidate	Rob Sand	Todd Halbur
Party	Democratic	Republican
Popular vote	600,719	597,826
Percentage	50.09%	49.84%
- Sand: 50–60% 60–70% 70–80% Halbur: 40–50% 50–60% 60–70% 70–80% 80–90%
Auditor of State before election
Rob Sand
Democratic
Elected Auditor of State
Rob Sand
Democratic

The 2022 Iowa State Auditor election was held on November 8, 2022, to elect the Iowa Auditor of State, concurrently with an election to the U.S. Senate, governor, U.S. House of Representatives, and other state and local elections. Primary elections were held on June 7, 2022.

Incumbent Democratic auditor Rob Sand narrowly won re-election to a second term in office against Republican nominee Todd Halbur. Sand was the only Democrat to win statewide office in Iowa in 2022, with Democrats losing control of the Attorney General and Treasurer's offices, as well as failing to capture any other statewide offices. Halbur conceded the race on November 18.

== Democratic primary ==
=== Candidates ===
==== Nominee ====
- Rob Sand, incumbent state auditor (2019–present)

=== Results ===
Democratic primary results
Party	Candidate	Votes	%
Democratic	Rob Sand (incumbent)	145,172	99.78%
Write-in		314	0.22%
Total votes		145,486	100.0%

== Republican primary ==
=== Candidates ===
==== Nominee ====
- Todd Halbur, banker and comptroller of the Iowa Alcoholic Beverages Division (2015–2018)

==== Eliminated in primary ====
- Mary Ann Hanusa, state representative from the 99th district (2011–2013), 16th district (2013–2021), and nominee for Secretary of State in 2006

=== Results ===
Republican primary results
Party	Candidate	Votes	%
Republican	Todd Halbur	83,966	51.06%
Republican	Mary Ann Hanusa	80,023	48.66%
Write-in		459	0.28%
Total votes		164,448	100.0%

== General election ==
=== Results ===
2022 Iowa State Auditor election
Party	Candidate	Votes	%
Democratic	Rob Sand (incumbent)	600,719	50.09%
Republican	Todd Halbur	597,826	49.84%
Write-in		826	0.07%
Total votes		1,199,371	100.00%
Democratic hold			

==== Counties that flipped from Democratic to Republican ====
- Boone (largest city: Boone)
- Buchanan (largest city: Independence)
- Chickasaw (largest city: New Hampton)
- Clinton (largest city: Clinton)
- Des Moines (largest city: Burlington)
- Fayette (largest city: Oelwein)
- Jackson (largest city: Maquoketa)
- Jasper (largest city: Newton)
- Marshall (largest city: Marshalltown)
- Muscatine (largest city: Muscatine)
- Lee (largest city: Fort Madison)
- Scott (largest city: Davenport)
- Tama (largest city: Tama)
- Woodbury (largest city: Sioux City)

==== By congressional district ====
Sand won three of four congressional districts, all of which elected Republicans.

District	Sand	Halbur	Representative
1st	52%	48%	Mariannette Miller-Meeks
2nd	53%	47%	Ashley Hinson
3rd	56%	44%	Cindy Axne (117th Congress)
3rd	56%	44%	Zach Nunn (118th Congress)
4th	40%	60%	Randy Feenstra

== See also ==
- 2022 Iowa elections
