= Rod Roberts (American politician) =

American politician

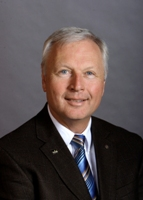
- Official portrait, 2009

Member of the Iowa House of Representatives
- In office January 8, 2001 – January 9, 2011
- Preceded by: James Drees
- Succeeded by: Dan Muhlbauer
- Constituency: 51st district (2003–2011); 80th district (2001–2003)

Personal details
- Born: October 22, 1957 (age 68) Waverly, Iowa, U.S.
- Party: Republican
- Spouse: Patricia Roberts
- Children: 2
- Website: Official website

Rod Roberts (born October 22, 1957) is an American politician who was the Iowa State Labor Commissioner from 2019 until 2025. Roberts is also a former Republican gubernatorial candidate and five-term Iowa State Representative from the 51st and 80th Districts. He served in the Iowa House of Representatives from 2001 to 2011 and was an assistant minority leader. He received his BA from Iowa Christian College, as did his wife.

During his last term in the Iowa House, Roberts served on the Administration and Rules, Appropriations, Local Government, State Government, and Transportation committees. His political experience includes serving on the Carroll School Board from 1996 to 2000. Other experience includes serving as past president of the Carroll Rotary Club and serving on the Board of Directors for New Hope Village (a facility supporting disabled adults) in Carroll.

== Early and personal life ==
Rod Roberts was born in 1957 to parents, Jack Roberts, a history teacher and Darlene Roberts, a bank teller. He grew up in Zearing, and was highly influenced by Ronald Reagan. Roberts and his wife, Trish, moved to Carroll in 1985.

Roberts' grandson Jack Sayers became a Republican member of the Mills County board of supervisors in January 2026.

== Electoral history ==
Roberts ran for the Iowa House's District 80 in 1998, losing to incumbent Democrat James Drees. He ran again in 2000 and won the election, defeating Democratic opponent Thomas Halbur. After the districts were redrawn for the 2002 election, Roberts was elected to the new District 51. He did not seek re-election to the House in 2010, choosing to seek the Republican nomination for governor instead. He was defeated in the primary, coming in a distant third behind former governor Terry Branstad, who went on to win the general election, and Iowa businessman Bob Vander Plaats. At the Republican state convention, he declined when nominated for the Republican nomination for Lieutenant Governor, endorsing then-State Senator Kim Reynolds for the position.

== Electoral history ==
*incumbent

Election	Political result	Candidate	Party	Votes	%
Iowa House of Representatives elections, 1998; District 80; Turnout: 9,610	Democratic hold	James Drees*	Democratic	4,889	50.9
Iowa House of Representatives elections, 1998; District 80; Turnout: 9,610	Democratic hold	Rod Roberts	Republican	4,721	49.1
Iowa House of Representatives elections, 2000; District 80; Turnout: 12,203	Republican gain from Democratic	Rod Roberts	Republican	6,539	53.6
Iowa House of Representatives elections, 2000; District 80; Turnout: 12,203	Republican gain from Democratic	Thomas H. Halbur	Democratic	5,655	46.3
Iowa House of Representatives elections, 2002; District 51	Republican (newly redistricted)	Rod Roberts*	Republican	unopposed	
Iowa House of Representatives elections, 2004; District 51	Republican hold	Rod Roberts*	Republican	unopposed	
Iowa House of Representatives elections, 2006; District 51	Republican hold	Rod Roberts*	Republican	unopposed	
Iowa House of Representatives elections, 2008; District 51	Republican hold	Rod Roberts*	Republican	unopposed	
Iowa gubernatorial primary elections, 2010; District 51; Turnout: 229,731	Republican	Terry Branstad	Republican	114,450	49.8
Iowa gubernatorial primary elections, 2010; District 51; Turnout: 229,731	Republican	Bob Vander Plaats	Republican	93,058	40.5
Iowa gubernatorial primary elections, 2010; District 51; Turnout: 229,731	Republican	Rod Roberts	Republican	19,896	8.7

Iowa House of Representatives
Preceded by James Drees	80th District; 2001 – 2003	Succeeded by James Hahn
Preceded by Jeff Elgin	51st District; 2003 – 2011	Succeeded by Dan Muhlbauer
