= Drees (surname) =

Drees is a surname. Notable people with the surname include:

- Jack Drees (1917–1988), American sportscaster
- James Drees (1930–2022), American politician
- Jochen Drees (born 1970), German football referee
- Tom Drees (born 1963), American baseball player
- Willem B. Drees (born 1954), Dutch philosopher and author
- Willem Drees (1886–1988), Dutch politician, historian, author and prime minister (1948–1958)
- Willem Drees Jr. (1922–1998), Dutch politician and economist
