= Dave Muhlbauer =

American politician

Lieutenant Governor-elect of Iowa
- Assuming office January 12, 2027
- Governor: Rob Sand (elect)
- Succeeding: Chris Cournoyer

Crawford County Supervisor
- Incumbent
- Assumed office January 2, 2023
- In office January 2, 2017 – January 1, 2021

Personal details
- Born: 1983 or 1984 (age 42–43) Manilla, Iowa, U.S.
- Party: Democratic
- Parent: Dan Muhlbauer (father)
- Education: Wartburg College (attended)

David Muhlbauer (born 1983/1984) is an American politician. A member of the Democratic Party, he is the lieutenant governor-elect of Iowa, assuming office in January 2027.

== Early life ==
Mulhbauer is from Manilla, Iowa. He attended Wartburg College, but returned to work on his family farm without graduating. He served as a supervisor in Crawford County, Iowa, from 2017 to 2021.

== Career ==
Muhlbauer announced his candidacy for the 2022 United States Senate election in Iowa, challenging Chuck Grassley. He ended his campaign due to the death of a four-year-old nephew in a farming accident.

In June 2026, Rob Sand chose Muhlbauer as his running mate in the 2026 Iowa gubernatorial election. Sand and Mulhbauer won the November general election.

== Electoral history ==
=== 2026 ===
2026 Iowa gubernatorial election
| Party | Candidate | Votes | % | ±% |
|---|---|---|---|---|
| Democratic | Rob Sand; Dave Muhlbauer | 759,705 | 55.54 | +16.5 |
| Republican | Zach Lahn; Derek Wulf | 608,231 | 44.46 | –13.5 |
| Write-in | | | | |
| Total votes | | 1,367,936 | 100.0 | |
| Democratic gain from Republican | | | | |

=== 2022 ===
2022 Crawford County Board of Supervisors election (3 seats)
| Party | Candidate | Votes | % | ±% |
|---|---|---|---|---|
| Republican | Kyle Schultz | 2,979 | | |
| Republican | Craig Dozark | 2,693 | | |
| Democratic | Dave Muhlbauer | 2,351 | | |
| Republican | Mike Fink | 2,318 | | |
| Write-in | | 26 | | |
| Turnout | | 4,528 | | |
| Registered electors | | | | |

2022 Crawford County Board of Supervisors Democratic primary
| Party | Candidate | Votes | % | ±% |
|---|---|---|---|---|
| Democratic | Dave Muhlbauer (write-in) | 91 | | |
| Write-in | | 19 | | |
| Blank votes | | 607 | | |
| Turnout | | 717 | | |
| Registered electors | | | | |

=== 2020 ===
2020 Crawford County Board of Supervisors election (2 seats)
| Party | Candidate | Votes | % | ±% |
|---|---|---|---|---|
| Republican | Ty Roseburg | 3,754 | | |
| Republican | Jean Heiden | 3,580 | | |
| Democratic | Dave Muhlbauer | 3,487 | | |
| Write-in | | 24 | | |
| Turnout | | 7,224 | 72 | |
| Registered electors | | | | |

2020 Crawford County Board of Supervisors Democratic primary
| Party | Candidate | Votes | % | ±% |
|---|---|---|---|---|
| Democratic | Dave Muhlbauer | 642 | | |
| Write-in | | 22 | | |
| Turnout | | 664 | | |

=== 2016 ===
2016 Crawford County Board of Supervisors election (2 seats)
| Party | Candidate | Votes | % | ±% |
|---|---|---|---|---|
| Democratic | Dave Muhlbauer | 3,611 | | |
| Republican | Cecil Blum | 3,473 | | |
| Republican | Jerry Buller | 3,364 | | |
| Turnout | | 7,037 | 75.23% | |
| Registered electors | | 9,354 | | |

2016 Crawford County Board of Supervisors Democratic primary
| Party | Candidate | Votes | % | ±% |
|---|---|---|---|---|
| Democratic | Dave Muhlbauer | 224 | 94.91% | |
| Write-in | | 12 | 5.08% | |
| Turnout | | 236 | 100% | |

== Personal life ==
Muhlbauer's father, Dan Muhlbauer, served in the Iowa Legislature. Dave and his wife, Linda, have three children.

Party political offices
| Preceded by Eric Van Lancker | Democratic nominee for Lieutenant Governor of Iowa; 2026 | Most recent |
Political offices
| Preceded by Chris Cournoyer | Lieutenant Governor of Iowa; Taking office 2027 | Elect |
