= Louis Muhlbauer =

American politician (1929–1997)

Member of the Iowa House of Representatives from the 96th district
- In office 1982–1992
- Preceding: Horace Daggett
- Preceded by: Sandy Greiner

Personal details
- Born: Louis John Muhlbauer; June 26, 1929 Halbur, Iowa, US
- Died: December 25, 1997 (aged 68)
- Children: 9, including Dan
- Education: Westmar University; University of Iowa (1950; BS)

Louis John Muhlbauer (June 26, 1929 — December 25, 1997) was an American politician who served as a Democrat in the Iowa House of Representatives from 1982 to 1992.

== Biography ==
Maulbauer was born on June 26, 1929, near Halbur, Iowa. In 1947, he graduated from Manning High School. He attended Westmar University for one year, then changed to the University of Iowa, graduating in 1950 with a Bachelor of Science. Maulbauer married Phyllis Kerkhoff of Templeton, on June 12, 1950, having 9 children with her. Muhlbauer taught agriculture at Manning High School for 3 years. He also worked as a farmer for 28 years in Audubon, Iowa.

Muhlbauer was elected a Democrat to the Iowa House of Representatives in 1982, serving until 1992. He often campaigned for rural development, education reform and agriculture.

Muhlbauer died in his home in Manilla, Iowa, on December 25, 1997. His son, Dan Muhlbauer, also served in the Iowa House of representatives from 2011 to 2015.

Muhlbauer's, grandson Dave Muhlbauer, announced he was a candidate in the 2022 United States Senate elections, challenging Chuck Grassley.
