= Dan Muhlbauer =

American politician (1958–2020)

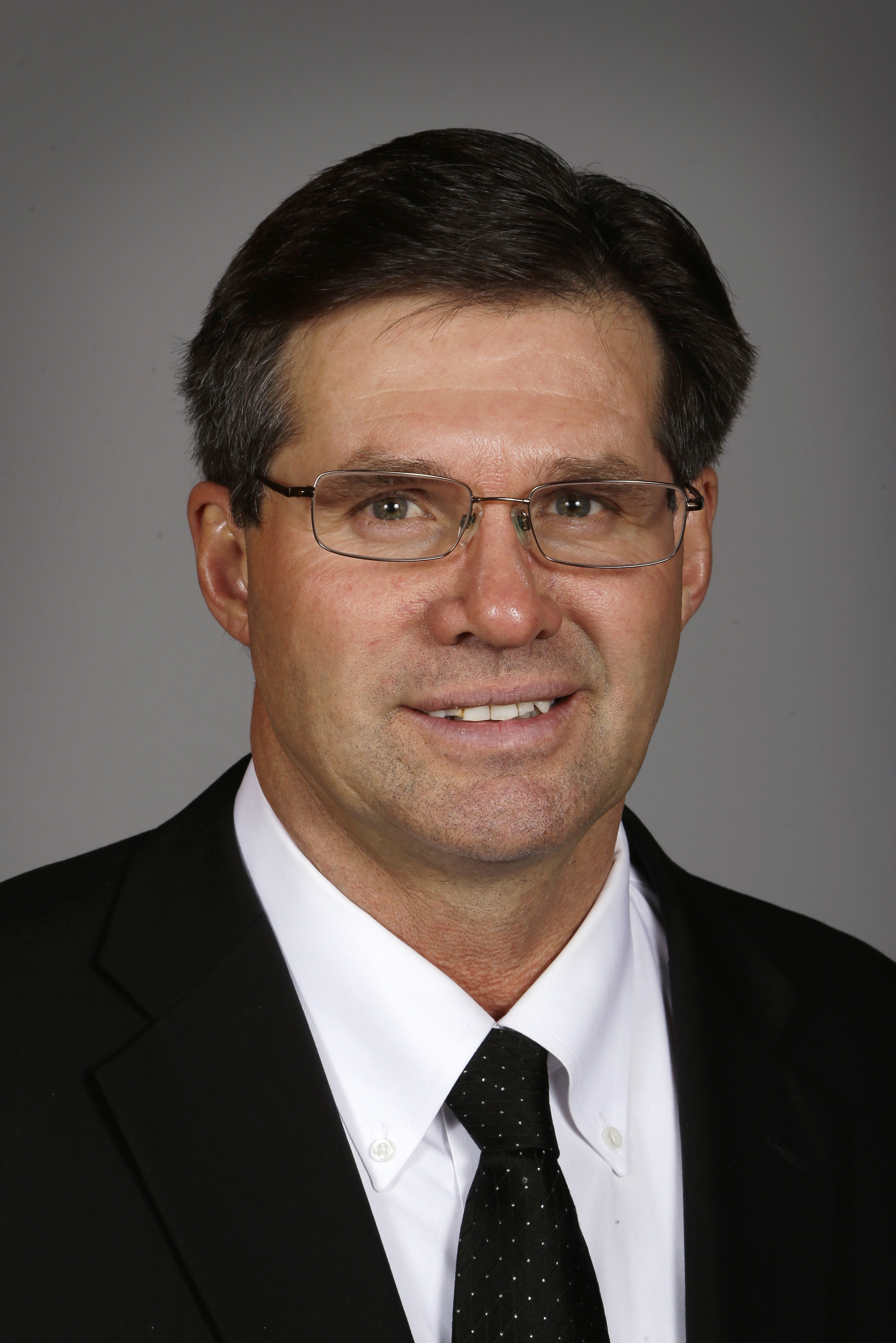

Member of the Iowa House of Representatives from the 12th district 51st (2011 – 2013)
- In office January 10, 2011 – January 12, 2015
- Preceded by: Rod Roberts
- Succeeded by: Brian Best

Personal details
- Born: August 6, 1958 Audubon, Iowa, U.S.
- Died: October 1, 2020 (aged 62) Manilla, Iowa, U.S.
- Party: Democratic
- Spouse: Patti
- Children: 3, including Dave Muhlbauer
- Parent: Louis Muhlbauer (father)
- Education: Iowa Falls Community College
- Profession: Farmer
- Website: Smith's website

Daniel W. Muhlbauer (August 6, 1958 – October 1, 2020) was an American politician who served in the Iowa House of Representatives from the 12th district from 2011 to 2015.

== Biography ==
Muhlbauer was born in Audubon, Iowa to Louis Muhlbauer, and was raised and resides in Manilla, Iowa. He has an A.A. in Agricultural Business from Iowa Falls Community College.

As of January 2013, Muhlbauer served on several committees in the Iowa House - the Agriculture, Public Safety, Veterans Affairs, and Ways and Means committees. He also served as the ranking member of the Administration and Rules committee. Muhlbauer was first elected in 2011, replacing Larry Lesle as the Democratic nominee after Lesle dropped out.

In a December 19, 2012, interview with the Daily Times Herald (Caroll, Iowa) newspaper, Representative Muhlbauer called for the ban and confiscation of all semi-automatic rifles and other firearms in the state.

"We cannot have big guns out here as far as the big guns that are out here, the semi-automatics and all of them. We can't have those running around out here. Those are not hunting weapons. We should ban those in Iowa. Even if you have them, I think we need to start taking them. We can't have those out there. Because if they're out there they're just going to get circulated around to the wrong people. Those guns should not be in the public's hands. There are just too big of guns."

Dan Muhlbauer was defeated by Brian Best in the 2014 election.

He died on October 1, 2020, in Manilla, Iowa aged 62.

His son Dave Muhlbauer was a candidate in the 2022 United States Senate elections, challenging Chuck Grassley. He is the lieutenant governor-elect of Iowa.

== Electoral history ==
*incumbent

Election	Political result	Candidate	Party	Votes	%
Iowa House of Representatives general elections, 2010; District 51; Turnout: 11,241	Democratic gain from Republican	Dan Muhlbauer	Democratic	6,410	57.02%
Iowa House of Representatives general elections, 2010; District 51; Turnout: 11,241	Democratic gain from Republican	Daniel D. Dirkx	Republican	4,510	40.12%
Iowa House of Representatives primary elections, 2012; District 12	Democratic	Dan Muhlbauer	Democratic	unopposed	
Iowa House of Representatives general elections, 2012; District 12; Turnout: 16,004	Democratic (newly redistricted)	Dan Muhlbauer	Democratic	9,189	57.42%
Iowa House of Representatives general elections, 2012; District 12; Turnout: 16,004	Democratic (newly redistricted)	Barney Bornhoft	Republican	5,861	36.62%
Iowa House of Representatives general elections, 2014; District 12; Turnout: 11,794	Republican gain from Democratic	Brian Best	Republican	6,445	54.6%
Iowa House of Representatives general elections, 2014; District 12; Turnout: 11,794	Republican gain from Democratic	Dan Muhlbauer	Democratic	5,349	45.4%

Iowa House of Representatives
Preceded by Rod Roberts	51st District; 2011 – 2013	Succeeded by Josh Byrnes
Preceded by Linda Upmeyer	1st District; 2013 – 2015	Succeeded by Brian Best
