= Rob Sand =

Governor-elect of Iowa (born 1982)

- Sand in 2025

Governor-elect of Iowa
- Assuming office January 12, 2027
- Lieutenant: Dave Muhlbauer (elect)
- Succeeding: Kim Reynolds

33rd Auditor of Iowa
- Incumbent
- Assumed office January 2, 2019
- Governor: Kim Reynolds
- Preceded by: Mary Mosiman

Personal details
- Born: Robert Howard Sand; August 12, 1982 (age 44) Decorah, Iowa, U.S.
- Party: Democratic
- Spouse: Christine Lauridsen (m. 2012)
- Children: 2
- Education: Brown University (BA); University of Iowa (JD)
- Website: Campaign website

Robert Howard Sand (born August 12, 1982) is an American lawyer and politician who is the governor-elect of Iowa. A member of the Democratic Party, he has served as the 33rd state auditor of Iowa since 2019.

Raised in Decorah, Iowa, Sand graduated from Brown University and the University of Iowa College of Law. Following early work on state political campaigns, he was appointed as the assistant attorney general of Iowa in 2010 and served until 2017. In 2018, he ran for state auditor, defeating Republican incumbent Mary Mosiman. After considering a run for governor of Iowa in 2022, Sand opted to run for reelection instead; he was the sole Democrat elected to a statewide office in Iowa in 2022.

In May 2025, he announced his candidacy in the 2026 Iowa gubernatorial election. He won the Democratic nomination unopposed and defeated Republican businessman and farmer Zach Lahn in the general election, 55.5% to 44.5%.

== Early life ==
Sand was born in Decorah, Iowa. His mother, Leslie, worked as a physical therapist and his father, Kevin, was a doctor. He is of Norwegian descent. While he attended Decorah High School, he spent two years lobbying community leaders in Decorah to build a skate park. Sand graduated from Decorah High School in 2001. He enrolled at Brown University, where he was awarded a Harry S. Truman Scholarship.

While in college, Sand spent a semester interning in the Washington, D.C., office of Senator Tom Harkin. He signed with IMG as a fashion model to help pay for his college education, and modeled for several brands, including Prada, Number (N)ine, and Giuliano Fujiwara as well as editorials for Vogue Italia, photographed by Steven Meisel. He made his first political donation to Howard Dean's 2004 presidential campaign, but missed the Iowa caucuses because he was modeling menswear in Milan. Sand graduated from Brown with a bachelor's degree in political science in 2005. He caucused for Barack Obama's presidential campaign in 2008. He was admitted to Harvard Law School before enrolling at the University of Iowa College of Law, earning his Juris Doctor in 2010. In law school, he worked as a law clerk for the Office of the Attorney General in Des Moines, and was a summer law clerk at Simmons Perrine Moyer Bergman PLC in Cedar Rapids, Iowa. He was the editor-in-chief of The Journal of Corporation Law.

== Political career ==
=== Early career ===
In 2006, Sand worked as an aide for State Representative Ed Fallon's campaign for governor of Iowa. After Fallon lost the primary election, Sand became the campaign manager for Denise O'Brien, the Democratic nominee for Iowa Secretary of Agriculture. While he was on the campaign trail, he met Tom J. Miller, who was Iowa Attorney General at the time.

=== Attorney General Office ===
Miller appointed Sand assistant attorney general in September 2010. Upon joining the attorney general's office, he became the lead prosecutor for the Iowa Film Office tax credit scandal, in which millions of dollars of film tax credits were fraudulently obtained. Miller then recruited Sand to work in the Area Prosecutions Division, which focuses on white-collar financial crime. Sand prosecuted an investment adviser for deceiving people to invest into the International Bank of Meekamui, an international Ponzi scheme emanating from Papua New Guinea.

Sand also prosecuted the $25 million Hot Lotto fraud scandal, in which seven lottery tickets across five states were rigged. Eddie Tipton, the former information security director of the Multi-State Lottery Association, confessed to rigging a random number generator in the largest lottery rigging scheme in U.S. history. Tipton was sentenced to 25 years in prison in 2017. After completing the prosecution, Sand resigned from the Attorney General's office so that he could run for office.

=== State Auditor ===
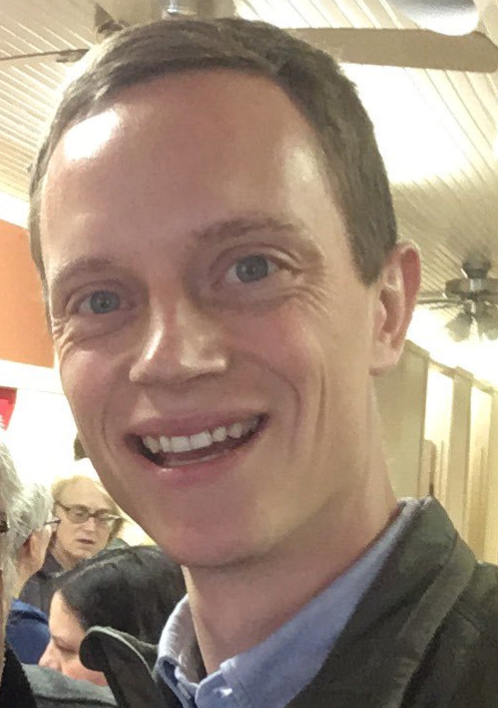
Sand in 2019

In the 2018 elections, Sand ran for Iowa State Auditor. He was not opposed in the Democratic Party primary election. Sand defeated Republican Mary Mosiman, the incumbent, in the general election, 51% to 46%, while Libertarian Fred Perryman received 3% of the vote. He became the fourth Democrat elected Iowa State Auditor, and just the second in the past 100 years.

Sand was sworn into office on January 2, 2019. At his swearing-in ceremony, he announced that he would have a "tri-partisan" leadership team, with his top three assistants being a Democrat, a Republican, and an independent. As state auditor, Sand developed the Public Innovations and Efficiencies (PIE) program, which awards fiscal efficiency in government. The PIE program inspired Shad White, the Republican state auditor of Mississippi, to develop a similar program. Before the 2020 presidential caucuses, multiple candidates sought Sand's endorsement. He did not endorse a candidate, but he did co-host a campaign event in Decorah with Cory Booker that he said did not constitute an endorsement.

After considering a campaign for governor of Iowa against Kim Reynolds, Sand announced in December 2021 that he would run for reelection in 2022. In January 2022, Mary Ann Hanusa, a Republican former state representative, announced that she would run for state auditor. Todd Halbur, a small business owner, defeated Hanusa in the primary election and Sand defeated Halbur in the November 8 general election with 50.1% of the vote.

Senate File 478, a bill that would restrict the powers of the State Auditor, passed the Iowa Legislature in April 2023 and was signed by Governor Reynolds in June. Sand held multiple press conferences and town halls across Iowa in opposition to the bill, claiming it targeted him as Iowa's only remaining statewide elected Democrat. The bill, which was opposed by all Democrats in the Iowa House and Senate along with six House Republicans, was opposed by the National State Auditors Association, the American Institute of CPAs, and former U.S. Comptroller General David Walker.

==== Investigations and audits ====
From 2011 to 2019, Jeffrey Dworek, a Metro Waste Authority (MWA) director of operations, defrauded the company of over $2 million by billing services not rendered to subcontractors he owned. He sent money to Lemar Programming Company, International Telemetry Technologies, and Britad Enterprises and deposited it in his own accounts. On January 8, 2021, he was sentenced to 4.75 years in federal prison on charges of mail fraud by Chief District Judge John Alfred Jarvey. This was a joint investigation with the Auditor and the FBI. He was prosecuted by United States Attorney for the Southern District of Iowa Richard D. Westphal.

From 2019 to 2025, the Auditor's office investigated the Johnson County Conservation Board due to misspent $95,000 by former Conservation Director Larry Gullett and Operations Superintendent Wade Schultz. The Johnson County Conservation Board requested the investigation after finding the mismanagement.

In 2020, an audit conducted by Sand's office found that Governor Kim Reynolds misspent $21 million from the CARES Act on unrelated state contracts rather than on managing the COVID-19 pandemic. The state returned the money to their coronavirus relief fund. Sand alleged Reynolds broke Iowa's law against self-promotion by appearing in a taxpayer-funded video to promote wearing a mask. An Iowa ethics board later found Reynolds did not break any laws. In November 2021, Sand said Reynolds improperly used nearly $450,000 in federal coronavirus relief funds to pay salaries for 21 staff members for three months in the last year.

In 2022 and 2023, an audit was conducted of the Iowa Judicial Branch, which found $27.6 million was sent to the wrong place and shorted state and local funds. This was caused by an IT error and was fixed but was investigated by the Auditor.

In 2024, an investigation took place at the University of Iowa's Department of Physics and Astronomy's Machine Shop after Brian Busch deposited $943,634.97 into his personal account instead of the university's accounts. It was also revealed that he possibly diverted money from the university to his own business. Busch was fired after being placed on paid administrative leave from 2021 to 2024. He was then arrested on charges of "First Degree Theft, Tampering with Records, Ongoing Criminal Conduct and First Degree Fraudulent Practice".

In January 2025, Sand concluded an investigation that found over $425,000 was misspent, from 2015 to 2022, by Children and Families of Iowa administrator Jodi Spargur-Tate, with $324,586 taken by her directly and $100,000 distributed to her family. The Children and Families of Iowa is funded by the United States Department of Labor and administered by Iowa Workforce Development (IWD). IWD asked the auditor's office to initiate the special investigation, after initially being investigated by Children and Families of Iowa. No charges have been filed, but the findings were given to the Polk County Sheriff’s Office, Iowa Division of Criminal Investigation, the Polk County Attorney’s Office, and the Iowa Attorney General’s Office.

In May 2025, Conesville Mayor Tom Van Auken and City Clerk Carol Zuniga raised concerns about a former clerk, Yamira Martinez, misusing $127,000 and asked that the Muscatine County Sheriff's Office investigate. After the Sheriff began investigating, the city additionally asked for an audit from the State Auditor. In June 2025, Sand concluded that investigation. Martinez was arrested by the Muscatine County Sheriff's Office for "two counts of ongoing criminal conduct, two counts of theft, and two counts related to forgery and fraud."

=== 2026 Iowa gubernatorial race ===
On May 12, 2025, Sand announced his candidacy for the Democratic nomination in the 2026 Iowa gubernatorial election after incumbent Republican Kim Reynolds declined to seek a third term in office.

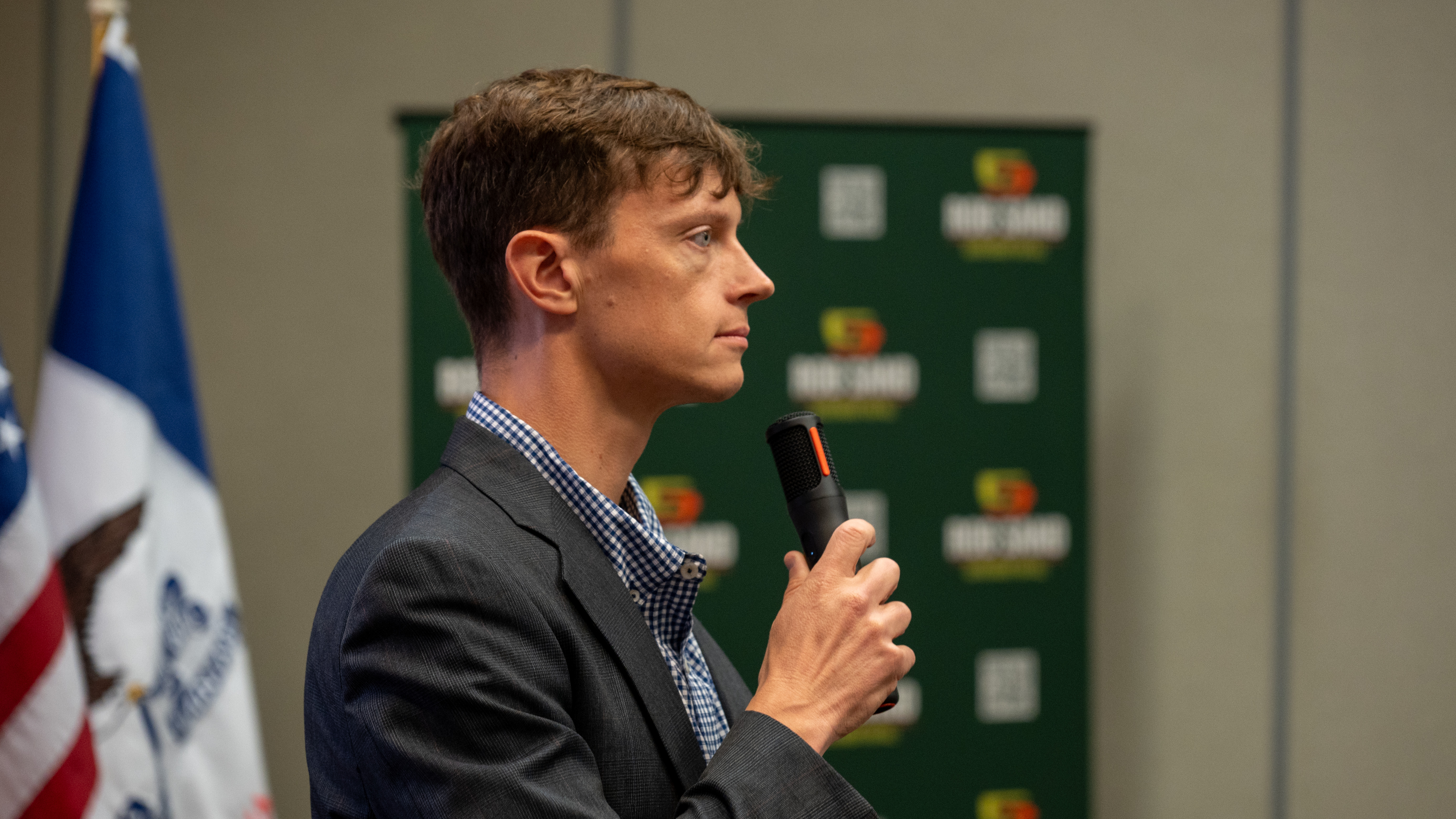
Sand speaking at his campaign rally in Clay County, Iowa, September 2025

Sand raised $8 million in 2024, $3 million of which came from his wife Christine and $4 million from her parents, Nixon and Nancy Lauridsen. Sand positioned himself as an "authentic" Iowan by touting his fondness for hunting, while also emphasizing the importance of "commonsense" reform, pointing to a declining economy, exodus of college-educated students, and a rapid cancer growth rate. He has been labeled a populist.

On June 16, 2025, Sand announced a "100 Town Hall Tour", holding events in all 99 counties in Iowa plus a second one in Lee County, as Lee County has dual county seats of Keokuk and Fort Madison. At a town hall attended by nearly 1,000 people in Iowa City, Sand said he would veto all "culture war"–related bills, but said he supported Iowa's recently implemented law banning transgender athletes from women's sports. On October 19, 2026, Sand withdrew from a debate that was scheduled for October 21 after his brother-in-law was killed in a car crash.

Sand defeated Republican nominee Zach Lahn in the November general election, 55.5% to 44.5%. He became the first Democrat elected governor of Iowa since 2006.

== Personal life ==
Sand in 2025

Sand and his wife, Christine Lauridsen, met in Des Moines and married in nearby Madison County on June 2, 2012. They have two children. Christine is the CEO of her family's business, Lauridsen Group. In October 2026, Sand's brother-in-law, Walter E. Lauridsen II, was killed in Lucas County when he was struck by a vehicle after walking into traffic.

Sand in Linn County, Iowa

Sand wrote The Winning Ticket: Uncovering America's Biggest Lottery Scam, a book about the Hot Lotto fraud scandal, with Reid Forgrave, a reporter for The Des Moines Register. The book was published on May 1, 2022.

== Electoral history ==
2018 Iowa Auditor Democratic primary election
Party	Candidate	Votes	%
Democratic	Rob Sand	147,840	80.9%
	Write-ins, overvotes, and undervotes	34,896	19.1%
Turnout		182,736	100%

2018 Iowa State Auditor election
Party	Candidate	Votes	%
Democratic	Rob Sand	660,169	50.96%
Republican	Mary Mosiman (incumbent)	601,320	46.42%
Libertarian	Fred Perryman	33,421	2.58%
	Write-ins	458	0.04%
Turnout		1,295,368	100%
Democratic gain from Republican			

2022 Iowa Auditor Democratic primary election
Party	Candidate	Votes	%
Democratic	Rob Sand (incumbent)	145,172	91.5%
	Write-ins, overvotes, and undervotes	13,573	8.5%
Turnout		158,745	100%

2022 Iowa State Auditor election
Party	Candidate	Votes	%
Democratic	Rob Sand (incumbent)	600,719	50.09%
Republican	Todd Halbur	597,826	49.84%
	Write-ins	826	0.07%
Turnout		1,230,416	100%
Democratic hold			

2026 Iowa gubernatorial Democratic primary election
Party	Candidate	Votes	%
Democratic	Rob Sand	189,404	99.6
Write-in		643	0.3
Total votes		190,047	100.0

2026 Iowa gubernatorial election
Party	Candidate	Votes	%
Democratic	Rob Sand; Dave Muhlbauer	759,705	55.54
Republican	Zach Lahn; Derek Wulf	608,231	44.46
Write-in			
Total votes		1,367,936	100.0
Democratic gain from Republican			

== Bibliography ==
- Sand, Rob; Forgrave, Reid (2022). The Winning Ticket: Uncovering America's Biggest Lottery Scam. Potomac Books. ISBN 9781640123717.

== See also ==
- List of Truman Scholars

Party political offices
Preceded by Jonathan Neiderbach	Democratic nominee for Auditor of Iowa; 2018, 2022	Succeeded by Taylor Wettach
Preceded by Deidre DeJear	Democratic nominee for Governor of Iowa; 2026	Most recent
Political offices
Preceded by Mary Mosiman	Auditor of Iowa; 2019–present	Incumbent
Preceded by Kim Reynolds	Governor of Iowa; Taking office 2027	Elect
