= 2022 Iowa gubernatorial election =

- November 8, 2022
- Turnout: 55.06% ▼6.09pp
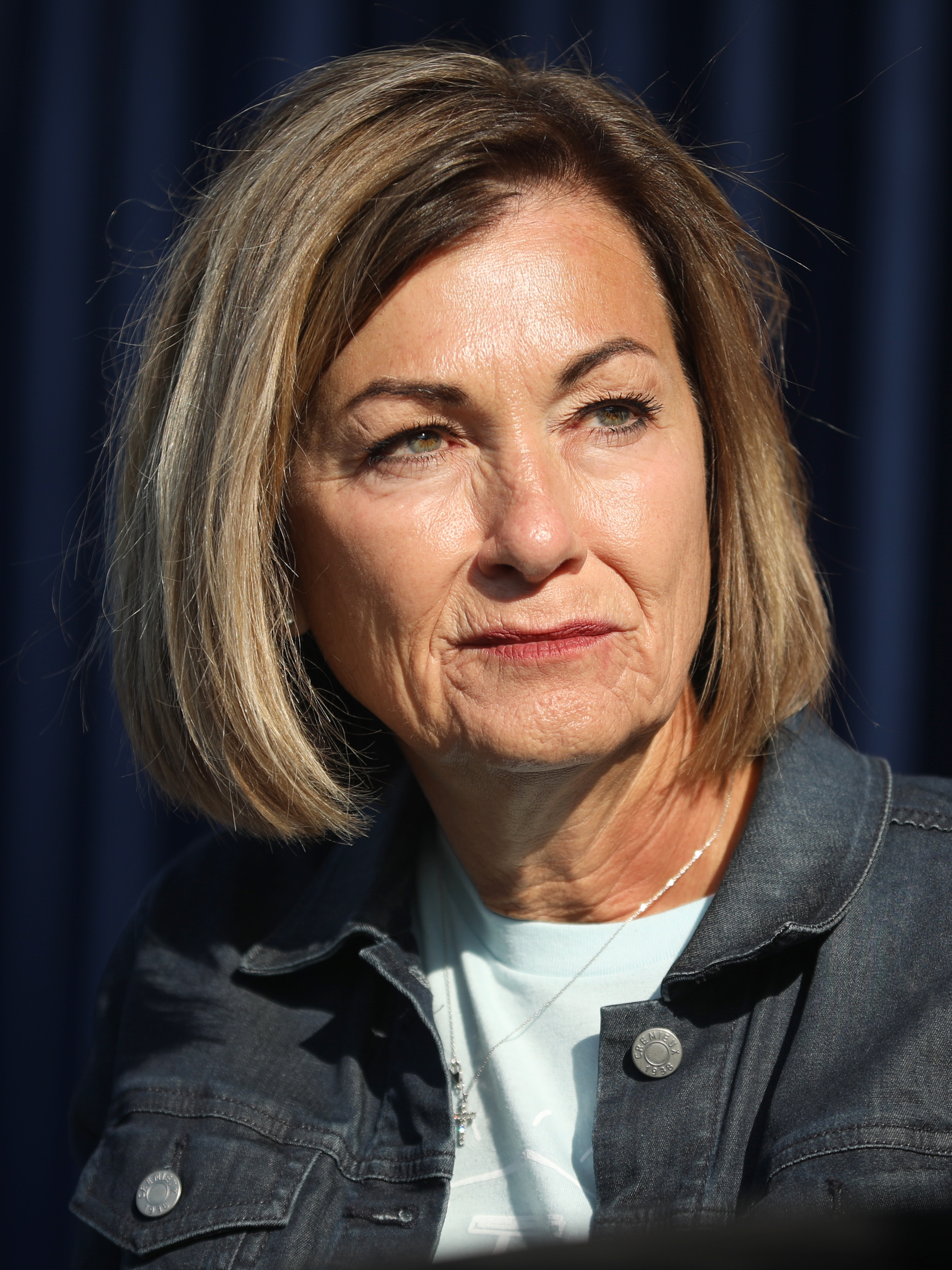

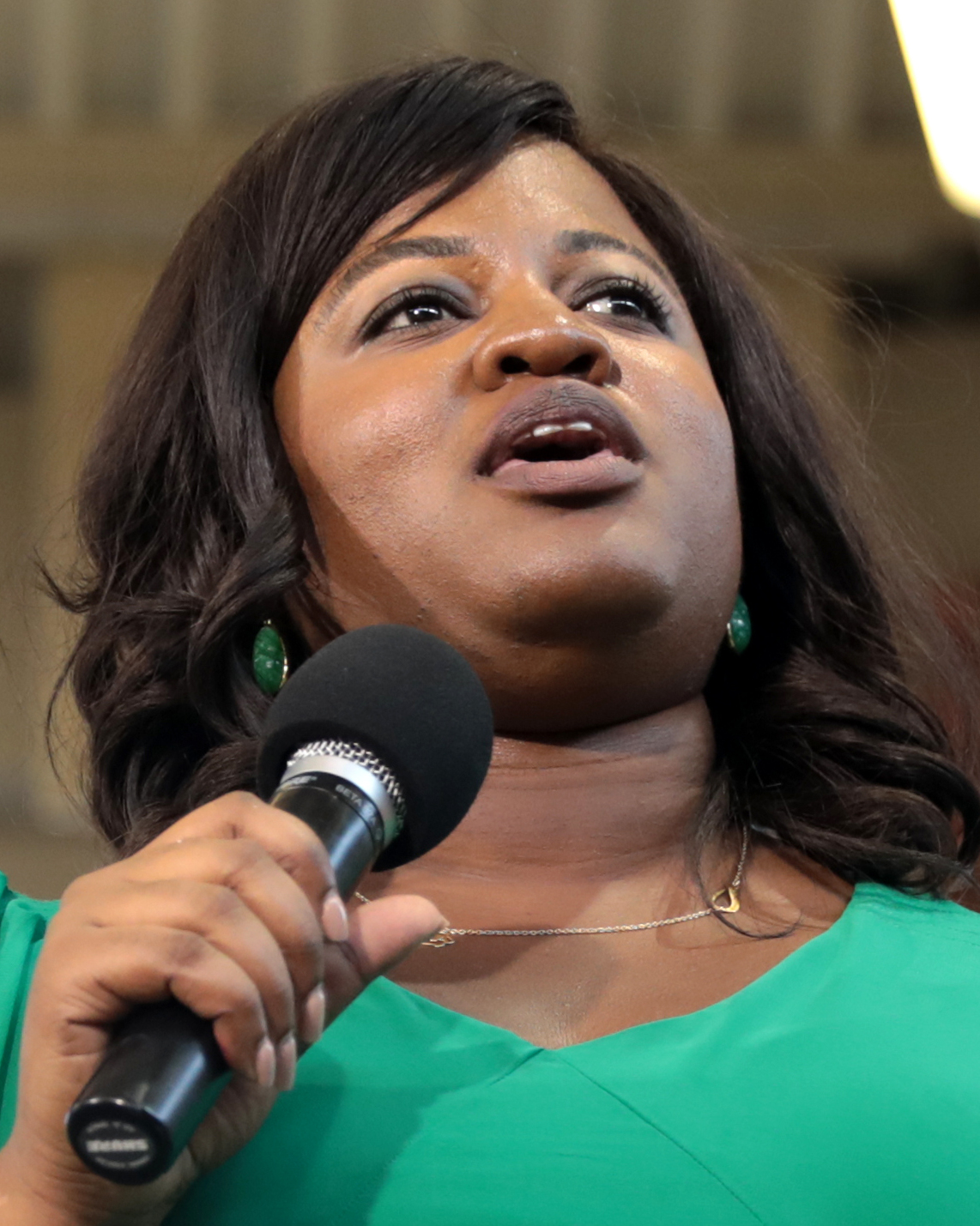
Nominee	Kim Reynolds	Deidre DeJear
Party	Republican	Democratic
Running mate	Adam Gregg	Eric Van Lancker
Popular vote	709,198	482,950
Percentage	58.04%	39.53%
- Reynolds: 40–50% 50–60% 60–70% 70–80% 80–90% >90% DeJear: 40–50% 50–60% 60–70% 70–80% 80–90% >90% Tie: 40–50%
Governor before election
Kim Reynolds
Republican
Elected Governor
Kim Reynolds
Republican

The 2022 Iowa gubernatorial election was held on November 8, 2022. Republican incumbent Kim Reynolds won re-election to a second full term, defeating Democratic nominee Deidre DeJear with 58.0% of the vote and winning seven counties she lost in 2018: Black Hawk, Clinton, Des Moines, Dubuque, Jefferson, Lee, and Scott.

First elected as lieutenant governor in 2010, Reynolds assumed the governorship on May 24, 2017, following the resignation of Governor Terry Branstad to become the U.S. ambassador to China. She was elected in her own right in 2018 in what was considered a minor upset before dramatically increasing her vote share in 2022.

== Republican primary ==
=== Candidates ===
==== Nominee ====
- Kim Reynolds, incumbent governor (2017–present)

==== Declined ====
- Ashley Hinson, U.S. representative from IA-01 (2021–present) (ran for re-election)

=== Results ===
Republican primary results
Party	Candidate	Votes	%
Republican	Kim Reynolds (incumbent)	185,293	99.03%
Write-in		1,808	0.97%
Total votes		187,101	100.00%

== Democratic primary ==
=== Candidates ===
==== Nominee ====
- Deidre DeJear, small business owner and nominee for secretary of state of Iowa in 2018

==== Withdrawn ====
- Ras Smith, state representative from HD-62 (2017–2023)

==== Declined ====
- Cindy Axne, U.S. representative from IA-03 (2019–2023) (ran for re-election)
- Abby Finkenauer, former U.S. representative from IA-01 (2019–2021) (ran for U.S. Senate)
- Rob Sand, Iowa state auditor (2019–present) (ran for re-election)

=== Endorsements ===
Deidre DeJear

U.S. senators

- Elizabeth Warren, Massachusetts (2013–present)

Organizations

- Democracy for America

=== Results ===
Democratic primary results
Party	Candidate	Votes	%
Democratic	Deidre DeJear	145,555	99.45%
Write-in		801	0.55%
Total votes		146,356	100.00%

== Minor parties and independents ==
=== Libertarian Party ===
==== Nominee ====
- Rick Stewart, Libertarian nominee for U.S. Senate in 2020, Secretary of Agriculture of Iowa in 2018, and independent candidate for U.S. Senate in 2014. Marco Battaglia of Des Moines was Stewart's running mate.

=== Independents ===
==== Declared ====
- Robert Bond

== General election ==
=== Predictions ===
Source	Ranking	As of
The Cook Political Report	Solid R	July 26, 2022
Inside Elections	Solid R	July 22, 2022
Sabato's Crystal Ball	Safe R	June 29, 2022
Politico	Solid R	August 12, 2022
RCP	Likely R	January 10, 2022
Fox News	Solid R	May 12, 2022
538	Solid R	July 31, 2022
Elections Daily	Safe R	November 7, 2022

=== Endorsements ===
Kim Reynolds (R)

Executive branch officials

- Nikki Haley, former U.S. ambassador to the United Nations (2018–2019) and former governor of South Carolina (2011–2017)
- Donald Trump, 45th president of the United States (2017–2021)

U.S. senators

- Marsha Blackburn, U.S. senator from Tennessee (2019–present)
- Joni Ernst, U.S. senator from Iowa (2015–present)
- Chuck Grassley, U.S. senator from Iowa (1981–present)
- Rick Scott, U.S. senator from Florida (2019–present)

U.S. representatives

- Ashley Hinson, U.S. representative from Iowa's 1st congressional district (2021–2023)
- Mariannette Miller-Meeks, U.S. representative from Iowa's 2nd congressional district (2021–2023)

State legislators

- Chris Cournoyer, state senator from the 49th district (2019–2023)
- Norlin Mommsen, state representative from the 97th district (2015–2023)
- Zach Nunn, state senator from the 15th district (2019–2023) and Republican nominee for Iowa's 3rd congressional district in 2022

Organizations

- Iowa Farm Bureau
- Maggie's List
- National Right to Life Committee
- NRA Political Victory Fund
- Susan B. Anthony List

Newspapers

- Sioux City Journal
Deidre DeJear (D)

State legislators

- David Maxwell, state representative from the 76th district (2013–2023) (Republican)

Individuals

- Fred Hubbell, businessman and nominee for governor in 2018

Organizations

- The Collective PAC
- EMILY's List
- Iowa Citizens for Community Improvement Action Fund
- Iowa Unity Coalition
- NARAL Pro-Choice America
- One Iowa Action

Labor unions

- AFL–CIO

Newspapers

- The Daily Iowan
- The Des Moines Register
- Storm Lake Times

=== Polling ===
Aggregate polls

Source of poll aggregation	Dates administered	Dates updated	Kim Reynolds (R)	Deidre DeJear (D)	Undecided (Note: Calculated by taking the difference of 100% and all other candidates combined.)	Margin
FiveThirtyEight	March 2 – October 19, 2022	October 20, 2022	52.6%	36.6%	10.8%	Reynolds +15.9%

Poll source	Date(s) administered	Sample size (Note: Key: A – all adults RV – registered voters LV – likely voters V – unclear)	Margin of error	Kim Reynolds (R)	Deidre DeJear (D)	Rick Stewart (L)	Other	Undecided
Selzer & Co.	October 31 – November 3, 2022	801 (LV)	± 3.5%	54%	37%	4%	2% (Note: "Someone else" with 1%; "Don't want to tell" with 1%)	3%
Cygnal (R) (Note: This poll was sponsored by the Iowans for Tax Relief Foundation.)	October 26–27, 2022	600 (LV)	± 4.0%	57%	38%	–	–	5%
Civiqs	October 22–25, 2022	623 (LV)	± 5.2%	54%	42%	–	2% (Note: "Someone else" with 2%)	1%
The Tarrance Group (R) (Note: Poll conducted for the NRSC.)	October 15–19, 2022	600 (LV)	± 4.1%	56%	39%	–	–	5%
Selzer & Co.	October 9–12, 2022	620 (LV)	± 3.9%	52%	35%	4%	4% (Note: "Someone else" with 3%; "Would not vote" with 1%)	4%
Emerson College	October 2–4, 2022	959 (LV)	± 3.1%	53%	36%	1%	2% (Note: "Someone else" with 2%)	9%
Cygnal (R)	October 2–4, 2022	600 (LV)	± 4.0%	59%	38%	–	–	3%
Cygnal (R)	July 13–14, 2022	600 (LV)	± 4.0%	56%	41%	–	–	3%
Selzer & Co.	July 10–13, 2022	597 (LV)	± 4.0%	48%	31%	5%	5%	9%
Selzer & Co.	February 28 – March 2, 2022	612 (LV)	± 4.0%	51%	43%	–	1% (Note: "Would not vote" (volunteered answer) with 1%)	5%
Cygnal (R)	February 20–22, 2022	610 (LV)	± 3.9%	55%	38%	–	–	7%

=== Debates ===
2022 Iowa gubernatorial general election debates
No.	Date	Host	Moderator	Link	Republican	Democratic
Key: P Participant A Absent N Non-invitee I Invitee W Withdrawn						
Key: P Participant A Absent N Non-invitee I Invitee W Withdrawn					Kim Reynolds	Deidre DeJear
2	October 18, 2022	Local ABC 5		Youtube	P	P

=== Results ===
State Senate district results

State House district results

2022 Iowa gubernatorial election
Party	Candidate	Votes	%	±%
Republican	Kim Reynolds (incumbent); Adam Gregg (incumbent)	709,198	58.04%	+7.78%
Democratic	Deidre DeJear; Eric Van Lacker	482,950	39.53%	−8.00%
Libertarian	Rick Stewart; Marco Battaglia	28,998	2.37%	+0.84%
Write-in		718	0.06%	+0.02%
Total votes		1,221,864	100.00%	
Turnout		1,230,416	55.06%	
Registered electors		2,234,666		
Republican hold				

==== By county ====
County	Reynolds / Gregg Republican		DeJear/ Van Lacker Democratic		Stewart / Battaglia Libertarian		Write-ins		Margin		Total
County	#	%	#	%	#	%	#	%	#	%	Total
Adair	2,333	73.50%	761	23.98%	79	2.49%	1	0.03%	1,572	49.53%	3,174
Adams	1,241	74.18%	381	22.77%	48	2.87%	3	0.18%	860	51.40%	1,673
Allamakee	4,100	70.76%	1,579	27.25%	115	1.98%	0	0.00%	2,521	43.51%	5,794
Appanoose	3,432	73.02%	1,134	24.13%	133	2.83%	1	0.02%	2,298	48.89%	4,700
Audubon	1,757	71.69%	661	26.97%	32	1.31%	1	0.04%	1,096	44.72%	2,451
Benton	7,745	68.26%	3,292	29.01%	305	2.69%	4	0.04%	4,453	39.25%	11,346
Black Hawk	24,236	51.41%	21,585	45.79%	1,289	2.73%	30	0.06%	2,651	5.62%	47,140
Boone	6,813	60.81%	4,065	36.28%	317	2.83%	9	0.08%	2,748	24.53%	11,204
Bremer	6,989	63.02%	3,820	34.45%	277	2.50%	4	0.04%	3,169	28.58%	11,090
Buchanan	5,356	65.18%	2,650	32.25%	209	2.54%	2	0.02%	2,706	32.93%	8,217
Buena Vista	3,745	72.79%	1,299	25.25%	101	1.96%	0	0.00%	2,446	47.54%	5,145
Butler	4,501	74.20%	1,429	23.56%	133	2.19%	3	0.05%	3,072	50.64%	6,066
Calhoun	3,021	75.90%	870	21.86%	88	2.21%	1	0.03%	2,151	54.05%	3,980
Carroll	6,261	75.87%	1,854	22.47%	135	1.64%	2	0.02%	4,407	53.41%	8,252
Cass	3,864	73.29%	1,299	24.64%	109	2.07%	0	0.00%	2,565	48.65%	5,272
Cedar	4,996	62.94%	2,734	34.44%	206	2.60%	2	0.03%	2,262	28.50%	7,938
Cerro Gordo	9,607	56.19%	7,096	41.50%	389	2.28%	5	0.03%	2,511	14.69%	17,097
Cherokee	3,579	78.20%	911	19.90%	87	1.90%	0	0.00%	2,668	58.29%	4,577
Chickasaw	3,570	72.28%	1,292	26.16%	76	1.54%	1	0.02%	2,278	46.12%	4,939
Clarke	2,494	73.53%	824	24.29%	71	2.09%	3	0.09%	1,670	49.23%	3,392
Clay	4,805	74.22%	1,536	23.73%	132	2.04%	1	0.02%	3,269	50.49%	6,474
Clayton	5,110	69.32%	2,105	28.55%	155	2.10%	2	0.03%	3,005	40.76%	7,372
Clinton	10,173	60.22%	6,406	37.92%	308	1.82%	7	0.04%	3,767	22.30%	16,894
Crawford	3,504	78.46%	876	19.61%	85	1.90%	1	0.02%	2,628	58.84%	4,466
Dallas	24,403	54.70%	19,272	43.20%	897	2.01%	37	0.08%	5,131	11.50%	44,609
Davis	2,338	77.19%	626	20.67%	65	2.15%	0	0.00%	1,712	56.52%	3,029
Decatur	2,081	74.51%	651	23.31%	61	2.18%	0	0.00%	1,430	51.20%	2,793
Delaware	5,632	73.65%	1,871	24.47%	143	1.87%	1	0.01%	3,761	49.18%	7,647
Des Moines	7,929	58.79%	5,184	38.43%	369	2.74%	6	0.04%	2,745	20.35%	13,488
Dickinson	6,062	73.18%	2,078	25.08%	142	1.71%	2	0.02%	3,984	48.09%	8,284
Dubuque	22,035	56.76%	15,774	40.63%	999	2.57%	13	0.03%	6,261	16.13%	38,821
Emmet	2,525	74.33%	803	23.64%	68	2.00%	1	0.03%	1,722	50.69%	3,397
Fayette	5,032	66.76%	2,328	30.88%	173	2.30%	5	0.07%	2,704	35.87%	7,538
Floyd	3,657	63.52%	1,953	33.92%	146	2.54%	1	0.02%	1,704	29.60%	5,757
Franklin	2,676	73.88%	881	24.32%	64	1.77%	1	0.03%	1,795	49.56%	3,622
Fremont	1,987	75.41%	600	22.77%	46	1.75%	2	0.08%	1,387	52.64%	2,635
Greene	2,473	68.09%	1,078	29.68%	80	2.20%	1	0.03%	1,395	38.41%	3,632
Grundy	4,033	74.99%	1,229	22.85%	110	2.05%	6	0.11%	2,804	52.14%	5,378
Guthrie	3,619	71.85%	1,275	25.31%	141	2.80%	2	0.04%	2,344	46.54%	5,037
Hamilton	3,914	68.15%	1,704	29.67%	124	2.16%	1	0.02%	2,210	38.48%	5,743
Hancock	3,302	75.25%	1,009	22.99%	74	1.69%	3	0.07%	2,293	52.26%	4,388
Hardin	4,645	70.40%	1,793	27.17%	158	2.39%	2	0.03%	2,852	43.23%	6,598
Harrison	4,069	73.55%	1,325	23.95%	131	2.37%	7	0.13%	2,744	49.60%	5,532
Henry	4,837	69.47%	1,987	28.54%	138	1.98%	1	0.01%	2,850	40.93%	6,963
Howard	2,310	68.18%	1,010	29.81%	65	1.92%	3	0.09%	1,300	38.37%	3,388
Humboldt	3,016	77.81%	796	20.54%	64	1.65%	0	0.00%	2,220	57.28%	3,876
Ida	2,239	81.33%	468	17.00%	44	1.60%	2	0.07%	1,771	64.33%	2,753
Iowa	5,001	66.87%	2,299	30.74%	173	2.31%	6	0.08%	2,702	36.13%	7,479
Jackson	5,260	67.58%	2,278	29.27%	243	3.12%	2	0.03%	2,982	38.31%	7,783
Jasper	9,552	63.62%	5,019	33.43%	437	2.91%	5	0.03%	4,533	30.19%	15,013
Jefferson	3,449	51.79%	3,086	46.34%	122	1.83%	3	0.05%	363	5.45%	6,660
Johnson	18,413	28.93%	43,686	68.65%	1,503	2.36%	36	0.06%	−25,273	−39.71%	63,638
Jones	5,285	64.64%	2,678	32.75%	209	2.56%	4	0.05%	2,607	31.89%	8,176
Keokuk	2,953	76.88%	837	21.79%	51	1.33%	0	0.00%	2,116	55.09%	3,841
Kossuth	5,030	74.67%	1,592	23.63%	113	1.68%	1	0.01%	3,438	51.04%	6,736
Lee	7,182	62.64%	4,032	35.17%	247	2.15%	4	0.03%	3,150	27.47%	11,465
Linn	42,887	45.87%	47,539	50.84%	3,008	3.22%	65	0.07%	−4,652	−4.98%	93,499
Louisa	2,578	73.18%	864	24.52%	81	2.30%	0	0.00%	1,714	48.65%	3,523
Lucas	2,599	75.27%	782	22.65%	68	1.97%	4	0.12%	1,817	52.62%	3,453
Lyon	4,438	88.78%	534	10.68%	26	0.52%	1	0.02%	3,904	78.10%	4,999
Madison	5,307	70.21%	2,077	27.48%	172	2.28%	3	0.04%	3,230	42.73%	7,559
Mahaska	6,299	77.49%	1,667	20.51%	159	1.96%	4	0.05%	4,632	56.98%	8,129
Marion	10,237	71.27%	3,808	26.51%	313	2.18%	6	0.04%	6,429	44.76%	14,364
Marshall	7,544	60.89%	4,584	37.00%	260	2.10%	2	0.02%	2,960	23.89%	12,390
Mills	4,034	71.41%	1,487	26.32%	125	2.21%	3	0.05%	2,547	45.09%	5,649
Mitchell	2,899	68.18%	1,263	29.70%	89	2.09%	1	0.02%	1,636	38.48%	4,252
Monona	2,555	76.61%	718	21.53%	58	1.74%	4	0.12%	1,837	55.08%	3,335
Monroe	2,266	76.40%	635	21.41%	64	2.16%	1	0.03%	1,631	54.99%	2,966
Montgomery	2,602	73.21%	871	24.51%	81	2.28%	0	0.00%	1,731	48.71%	3,554
Muscatine	7,902	59.72%	4,950	37.41%	371	2.80%	8	0.06%	2,952	22.31%	13,231
O'Brien	4,541	84.15%	776	14.38%	77	1.43%	2	0.04%	3,765	69.77%	5,396
Osceola	2,018	87.55%	245	10.63%	40	1.74%	2	0.09%	1,773	76.92%	2,305
Page	3,796	74.39%	1,192	23.36%	113	2.21%	2	0.04%	2,604	51.03%	5,103
Palo Alto	2,706	75.12%	829	23.01%	62	1.72%	5	0.14%	1,877	52.11%	3,602
Plymouth	8,027	81.72%	1,643	16.73%	152	1.55%	1	0.01%	6,384	64.99%	9,823
Pocahontas	2,269	79.34%	532	18.60%	59	2.06%	0	0.00%	1,737	60.73%	2,860
Polk	85,542	44.79%	100,312	52.52%	4,968	2.60%	177	0.09%	−14,770	−7.73%	190,999
Pottawattamie	18,152	62.42%	10,318	35.48%	590	2.03%	20	0.07%	7,834	26.94%	29,080
Poweshiek	4,491	58.88%	2,957	38.77%	177	2.32%	3	0.04%	1,534	20.11%	7,628
Ringgold	1,574	75.67%	456	21.92%	48	2.31%	2	0.10%	1,118	53.75%	2,080
Sac	3,135	79.17%	754	19.04%	68	1.72%	3	0.08%	2,381	60.13%	3,960
Scott	34,604	54.29%	27,530	43.19%	1,573	2.47%	35	0.05%	7,074	11.10%	63,742
Shelby	3,570	76.01%	1,023	21.78%	103	2.19%	1	0.02%	2,547	54.23%	4,697
Sioux	12,790	90.13%	1,280	9.02%	117	0.82%	3	0.02%	11,510	81.11%	14,190
Story	16,214	43.85%	19,876	53.76%	852	2.30%	30	0.08%	−3,662	−9.90%	36,972
Tama	4,389	66.16%	2,053	30.95%	186	2.80%	6	0.09%	2,336	35.21%	6,634
Taylor	1,850	80.50%	405	17.62%	42	1.83%	1	0.04%	1,445	62.88%	2,298
Union	3,180	69.42%	1,278	27.90%	121	2.64%	2	0.04%	1,902	41.52%	4,581
Van Buren	2,189	78.15%	568	20.28%	44	1.57%	0	0.00%	1,621	57.87%	2,801
Wapello	6,822	64.91%	3,397	32.32%	285	2.71%	6	0.06%	3,425	32.59%	10,510
Warren	14,631	61.38%	8,531	35.79%	656	2.75%	19	0.08%	6,100	25.59%	23,837
Washington	5,692	64.65%	2,937	33.36%	171	1.94%	5	0.06%	2,755	31.29%	8,805
Wayne	1,939	81.37%	406	17.04%	38	1.59%	0	0.00%	1,533	64.33%	2,383
Webster	8,028	66.62%	3,774	31.32%	238	1.97%	11	0.09%	4,254	35.30%	12,051
Winnebago	2,991	67.99%	1,301	29.57%	104	2.36%	3	0.07%	1,690	38.42%	4,399
Winneshiek	5,530	57.15%	3,974	41.07%	171	1.77%	2	0.02%	1,556	16.08%	9,677
Woodbury	18,982	66.24%	9,053	31.59%	591	2.06%	30	0.10%	9,929	34.65%	28,656
Worth	2,123	65.26%	1,039	31.94%	88	2.71%	3	0.09%	1,084	33.32%	3,253
Wright	3,105	72.43%	1,071	24.98%	110	2.57%	1	0.02%	2,034	47.45%	4,287
TOTALS	709,198	58.04%	482,950	39.53%	28,998	2.37%	718	0.06%	226,248	18.52%	1,221,864

==== Counties that flipped from Democratic to Republican ====
- Black Hawk (largest city: Waterloo)
- Clinton (largest city: Clinton)
- Des Moines (largest city: Burlington)
- Dubuque (largest city: Dubuque)
- Jefferson (largest city: Fairfield)
- Lee (largest city: Fort Madison)
- Scott (largest city: Davenport)

==== By congressional district ====
Reynolds won all four congressional districts.

District	Reynolds	DeJear	Representative
1st	55%	43%	Mariannette Miller-Meeks
2nd	57%	41%	Ashley Hinson
3rd	53%	44%	Zach Nunn
4th	69%	29%	Randy Feenstra

== See also ==
- Elections in Iowa
- Political party strength in Iowa
- 2022 Iowa elections

== Notes ==
Partisan clients
