= 2022 Iowa elections =

A general election was held in the U.S. state of Iowa on November 8, 2022. All of Iowa's executive officers were up for election, as well as a United States Senate seat, all four of Iowa's seats in the United States House of Representatives, 25 (half) of the seats in the Iowa Senate, and all 100 seats in the Iowa House of Representatives. Primary elections were held on June 7, 2022.

The Republican Party of Iowa had a very successful election. All three statewide incumbent Republicans (governor, secretary of agriculture, and secretary of state) won reelection by more than 18%, two of three statewide incumbent Democrats (28-year incumbent attorney general and 40-year incumbent treasurer) lost to Republican challengers, and the remaining incumbent Democrat (4-year incumbent auditor) won by less than 3,000 votes and 0.24%. Republicans also won all 4 of Iowa's U.S. House seats.

== Governor and lieutenant governor ==
Incumbent Republican governor Kim Reynolds ran for re-election to a second full term as governor. Reynolds won the Republican primary unopposed.

Deidre DeJear, a small business owner and nominee for Secretary of State of Iowa in 2018, won the Democratic primary unopposed.

In Iowa, nominees for lieutenant governor are chosen at party conventions. They then run on a ticket with the gubernatorial nominee. Incumbent Republican lieutenant governor Adam Gregg ran for re-election to a second term in office.

Results by county: Reynolds: 50–60%; 60–70%; 70–80%; 80–90%; >90%; DeJear: 50–60%; 60–70%

Iowa gubernatorial election, 2022
Party	Candidate	Votes	%
Republican	Kim Reynolds / Adam Gregg (incumbent)	709,198	58.0
Democratic	Deidre DeJear / Eric Van Lancker	482,950	39.5
Libertarian	Rick Stewart / Marco Battaglia	28,998	2.4
Write-in		718	0.1
Total votes		1,221,864	100.0
Republican hold			

== Attorney general ==
Incumbent Democratic attorney general Tom Miller, who had served in the position since 1995, and previously from 1979 to 1991, ran for re-election to an eighth consecutive and eleventh overall term in office.

Guthrie County attorney Brenna Bird won the Republican primary unopposed.

Bird defeated incumbent attorney general Tom Miller with 50.8% of the vote.

Results by county: Bird: 50–60%; 60–70%; 70–80%; 80–90%; T. Miller: 50–60%; 60–70%; 70–80%

2022 Iowa Attorney General election
Party	Candidate	Votes	%
Republican	Brenna Bird	611,432	50.82%
Democratic	Tom Miller (incumbent)	590,890	49.11%
Write-in		801	0.07%
Total votes		1,203,123	100.00%
Republican gain from Democratic			

== Secretary of state ==
Incumbent Republican secretary of state Paul Pate, Democratic Linn County auditor Joel Miller, and Clinton County auditor Eric Van Lancker ran. Miller defeated Van Lancker in the primary election on June 7.

Pate defeated Miller in the general election with 60.0% of the vote.

Results by county: Pate: 50–60%; 60–70%; 70–80%; 80–90%; J. Miller: 50–60%; 60–70%

2022 Iowa Secretary of State election
Party	Candidate	Votes	%
Republican	Paul D. Pate (incumbent)	723,250	60.05%
Democratic	Joel Miller	480,474	39.88%
Write-in		708	0.06%
Total votes		1,204,432	100.00%
Republican hold			

== Treasurer ==
Incumbent Democratic state treasurer Michael Fitzgerald, who had served in the position since 1983, ran for re-election to an eleventh term in office.

The Republican nominee was Roby Smith, a state senator.

Smith defeated Fitzgerald in the general election with 51.3% of the vote.

Results by county: Smith: 50–60%; 60–70%; 70–80%; 80–90%; Fitzgerald: 40–50%; 50–60%; 60–70%; 70–80%

2022 Iowa Treasurer election
Party	Candidate	Votes	%
Republican	Roby Smith	614,943	51.26%
Democratic	Michael Fitzgerald (incumbent)	584,021	48.68%
Write-in		667	0.06%
Total votes		1,199,631	100.0%
Republican gain from Democratic			

== Auditor ==
Incumbent Democratic state auditor Rob Sand ran for re-election to a second term in office.

Republican businessman Todd Halbur defeated former state representative Mary Ann Hanusa in the primary election.

Halbur conceded defeat on November 18.

Results by county: Sand: 50–60%; 60–70%; 70–80%; Halbur: 40–50%; 50–60%; 60–70%; 70–80%; 80–90%

Iowa State Auditor election, 2022
Party	Candidate	Votes	%
Democratic	Rob Sand (incumbent)	600,719	50.09%
Republican	Todd Halbur	597,826	49.84%
Write-in		826	0.07%
Total votes		1,199,371	100.00%
Democratic hold			

== Secretary of Agriculture ==
Incumbent Republican Secretary of Agriculture Mike Naig ran for re-election to a second term in office.

Polk County Soil and Water Conservation District Commissioner John Norwood ran for the Democrats.

Naig defeated Norwood in the general election with 61.1% of the vote. This was the only Iowa statewide election where Linn County voted for the Republican nominee.

Results by county: Naig: 50–60%; 60–70%; 70–80%; 80–90%; 90–100%; Norwood: 50–60%; 60–70%

Iowa Secretary of Agriculture election, 2022
Party	Candidate	Votes	%
Republican	Mike Naig (incumbent)	730,285	61.13%
Democratic	John Norwood	463,652	38.81%
Write-in		770	0.06%
Total votes		1,194,707	100.00%
Republican hold			

== United States Senate ==
Incumbent Republican senator Chuck Grassley ran for reelection to an eighth term in office.

Five Democrats filed to run: retired U.S. Navy admiral Michael Franken, former U.S. Representative Abby Finkenauer, Minden city councilor Glenn Hurst, former Crawford County supervisor Dave Muhlbauer (withdrawn), and former state representative Bob Krause (withdrawn).

Grassley defeated Franken in the general election with 56.0% of the vote.

United States Senate election in Iowa, 2022
Party	Candidate	Votes	%
Republican	Chuck Grassley (incumbent)	681,501	56.01%
Democratic	Michael Franken	533,330	43.84%
Write-in		1,815	0.15%
Total votes		1,216,646	100.00%
Republican hold			

== United States House of Representatives ==
All of Iowa's four seats in the United States House of Representatives were up for election in 2022 and were contested. Republicans won all four seats following the defeat of Democratic incumbent Cindy Axne in Iowa's 3rd congressional district, which she narrowly lost to Zach Nunn.

Results by congressional district: Republican: 50–60%; 60–70%

== Ballot measures ==
=== Amendment 1 ===
The Right to Keep and Bear Arms Initiative would enshrine in the state constitution a fundamental right to keep and bear arms.

Amendment 1
Choice	Votes	%
For	748,363	65.17
Against	399,959	34.83
Total	1,148,322	100.00
