= Brent Siegrist =

American politician

- Siegrist in 2025

Member of the Iowa House of Representatives from the 19th district
- Incumbent
- Assumed office January 10, 2021
- Preceded by: Mary Ann Hanusa

Member of the Iowa House of Representatives from the 84th district
- In office January 14, 1985 – January 12, 2003

Personal details
- Born: September 30, 1952 (age 73) Council Bluffs, Iowa, U.S.
- Party: Republican
- Spouse: Valerie
- Children: two
- Occupation: Teacher, consultant

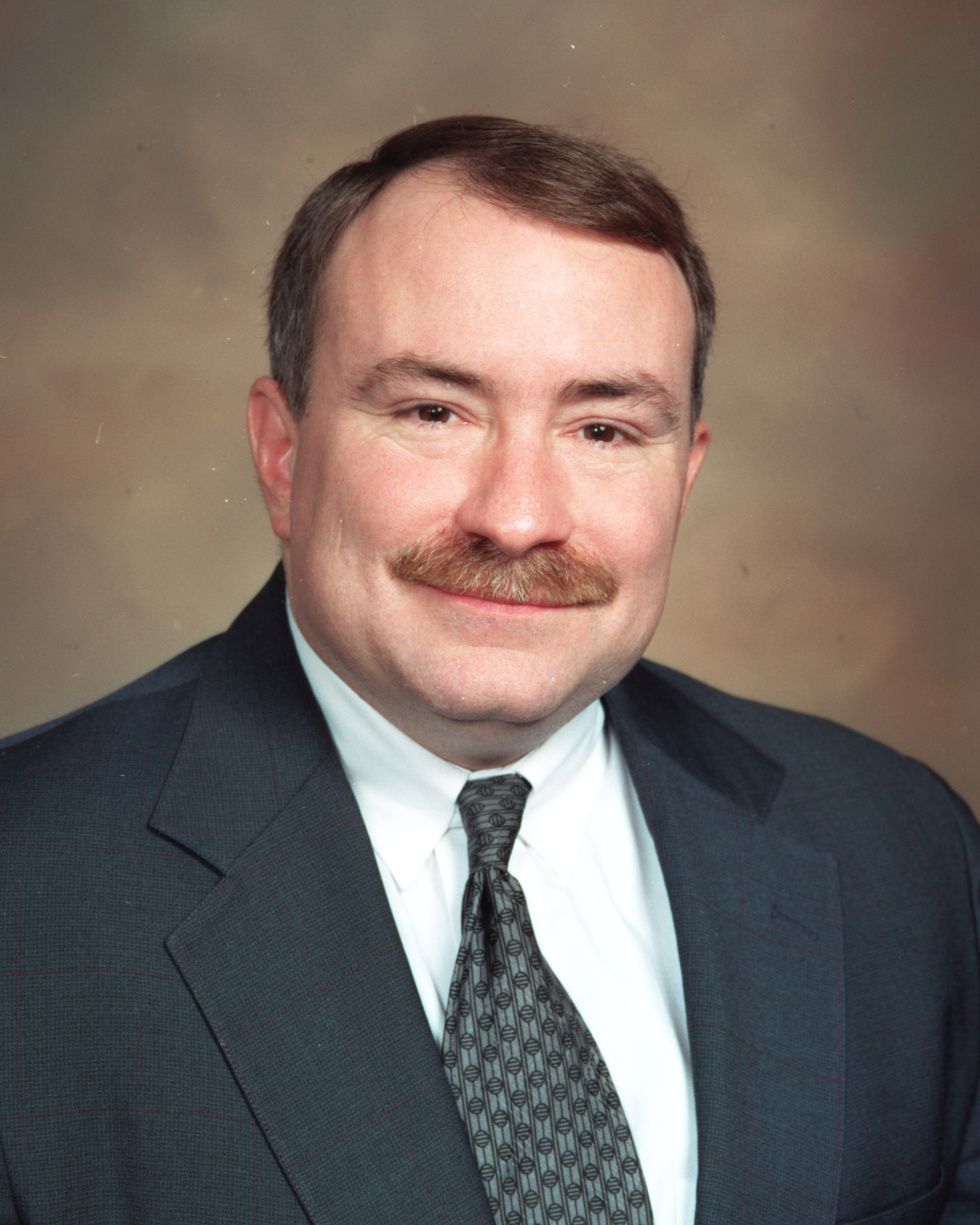
Siegrist in 2001

J. Brent Siegrist (born September 30, 1952) is an American politician from the state of Iowa. A member of the Republican Party, he served in the Iowa House of Representatives for twenty years, non-consecutively, ten of which he filled the role of Speaker.

== Early life and education ==
Brent Siegrist was born in 1952 in Council Bluffs, Iowa, where he was raised. He graduated from Dana College with a Bachelor of Arts.

== Career ==
Prior to getting into politics, Siegrist worked as a high school teacher. He was first elected to the Iowa House of Representatives in the 1984 elections. He served as Speaker of the Iowa House.

Siegrist announced he would not seek reelection to the Iowa House in 2002, choosing instead to run for a seat in the United States House of Representatives. He lost in the Republican primary to Steve King.

Since leaving the Iowa House, Siegrist has worked for the Iowa Area Education Agencies. In 2013, he announced he would run for mayor of Council Bluffs, Iowa. He lost the election to Matt Walsh, a fellow Republican.

In 2020 Siegrist rejoined the Iowa House of Representatives, representing district 16.

=== Committee assignments ===
As of January 2026, Siegrist serves on the following committees in the Iowa House:

- Administration and Rules (chair)
- Transportation (vice chair)
- State Government
- Ways and Means
- Education Appropriations Subcommittee
- All-Terrain Vehicles and Off-Road Utility Vehicles on Highways Interim Study Committee

== Personal ==
Siegrist and his wife, Valerie, have two children, Robert and Harriet. He resides in Council Bluffs, Iowa.

Iowa House of Representatives
Preceded by Carter Nordman	19th District; 2023 – present	Succeeded by Incumbent
Preceded by Mary Ann Hanusa	16th District; 2023 – present	Succeeded by David Sieck
Preceded by	84th District; 1993 – 2003	Succeeded by
Preceded by	99th District; 1985 – 1993	Succeeded by
