= Mary Ann Hanusa =

American politician (born 1963)

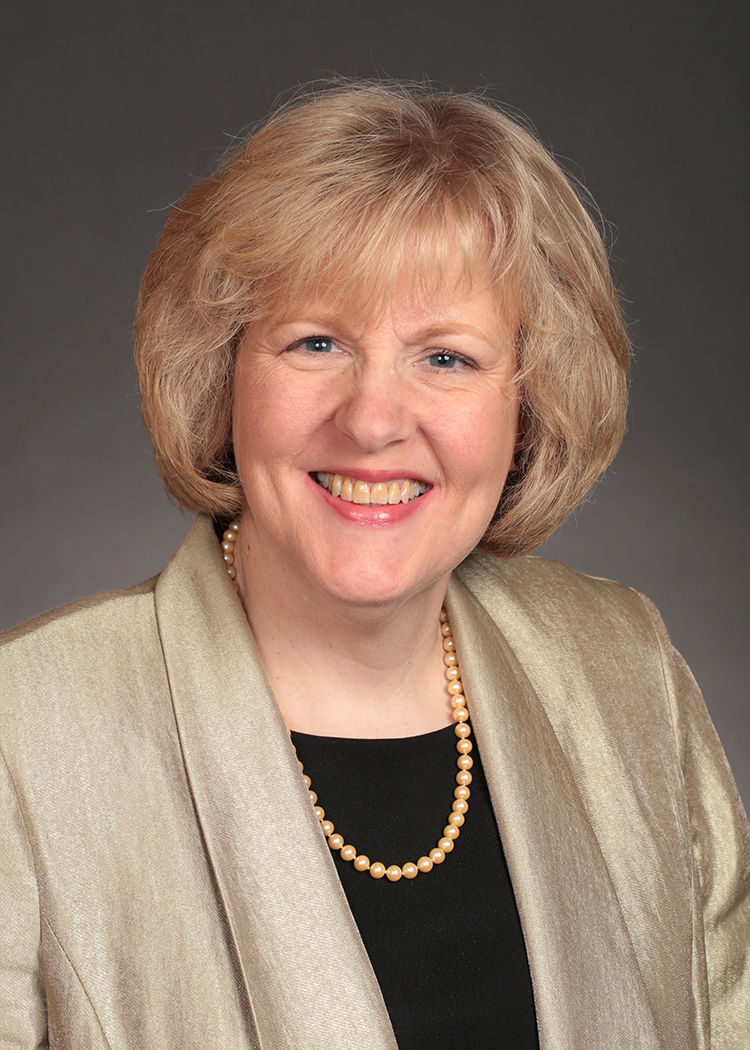
- Hanusa in 2019

Member of the Iowa House of Representatives
- In office January 10, 2011 – January 10, 2021
- Preceded by: Doug Struyk
- Succeeded by: Brent Siegrist
- Constituency: 99th (2011–2013); 16th (2013–2021)

Director of the White House Office of Presidential Correspondence
- In office 2001–2006
- President: George W. Bush
- Preceded by: Desiree Sayle
- Succeeded by: Darren Hipp

Personal details
- Born: May 26, 1963 (age 63) Council Bluffs, Iowa, U.S.
- Party: Republican
- Spouse: Charlie Johnson
- Education: Concordia University, Nebraska (BS); University of Nebraska–Lincoln (MA)

Mary Ann Hanusa (born May 26, 1963) is an American politician who served as a member of the Iowa House of Representatives from 2011 to 2021. She is a member of the Republican Party.

== Early life and education ==
Hanusa was born, raised, and resides in Council Bluffs, Iowa. She earned a Bachelor of Science degree in education from Concordia Teachers College and a Master of Arts in American history from the University of Nebraska–Lincoln.

== Career ==
Before election to the Iowa House, she served on the staff of Senator Charles Grassley before becoming director of the White House Office of Presidential Correspondence under George W. Bush, serving from 2001 to 2006. She was the Republican candidate for Iowa Secretary of State in 2006, replacing previous nominee Chuck Allison, who dropped out of the race after the primary.

In the Iowa House, Hanusa served on the Education, Labor, and Local Government committees. She also served as the chair of the Economic Growth Committee and as a member of the Economic Development Appropriations Subcommittee.

Hanusa was a candidate in the Republican primary for the 2022 election in Iowa's 3rd congressional district before withdrawing from the race. In January 2022, Hanusa announced that she would challenge incumbent Rob Sand for Iowa State Auditor in the 2022 elections. Todd Halbur, a small business owner, defeated Hanusa in the primary election.

Party political offices
Preceded by Mike Hartwig	Republican nominee for Secretary of State of Iowa; 2006	Succeeded by Matt Schultz
Iowa House of Representatives
Preceded by Doug Struyk	Member of the Iowa House of Representatives from the 99th district 2011–2013	Succeeded by Pat Murphy
Preceded by Bob Hager	Member of the Iowa House of Representatives from the 16th district 2013–2021	Succeeded by Brent Siegrist
