= James Drees =

American politician (1930–2022)

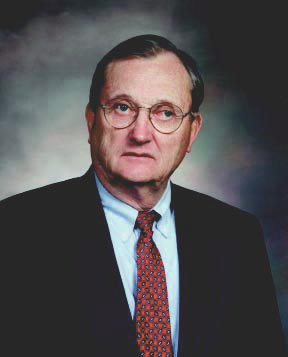

Member of the Iowa House of Representatives
- In office January 9, 1995 – January 7, 2001

Personal details
- Born: July 6, 1930 Manning, Iowa, U.S.
- Died: June 20, 2022 (aged 91) Carroll, Iowa, U.S.
- Party: Democratic
- Spouse: Patricia
- Children: three
- Occupation: Farmer

James Henry Drees (July 6, 1930 – June 20, 2022) was an American politician in the state of Iowa.

Drees was born in Manning, Iowa. He attended Iowa State University and was a farmer. He served in the Iowa House of Representatives from 1995 to 2001, as a Democrat. Drees died on June 20, 2022, at the age of 91.
