= Derek Wulf =

American politician (born 1981)

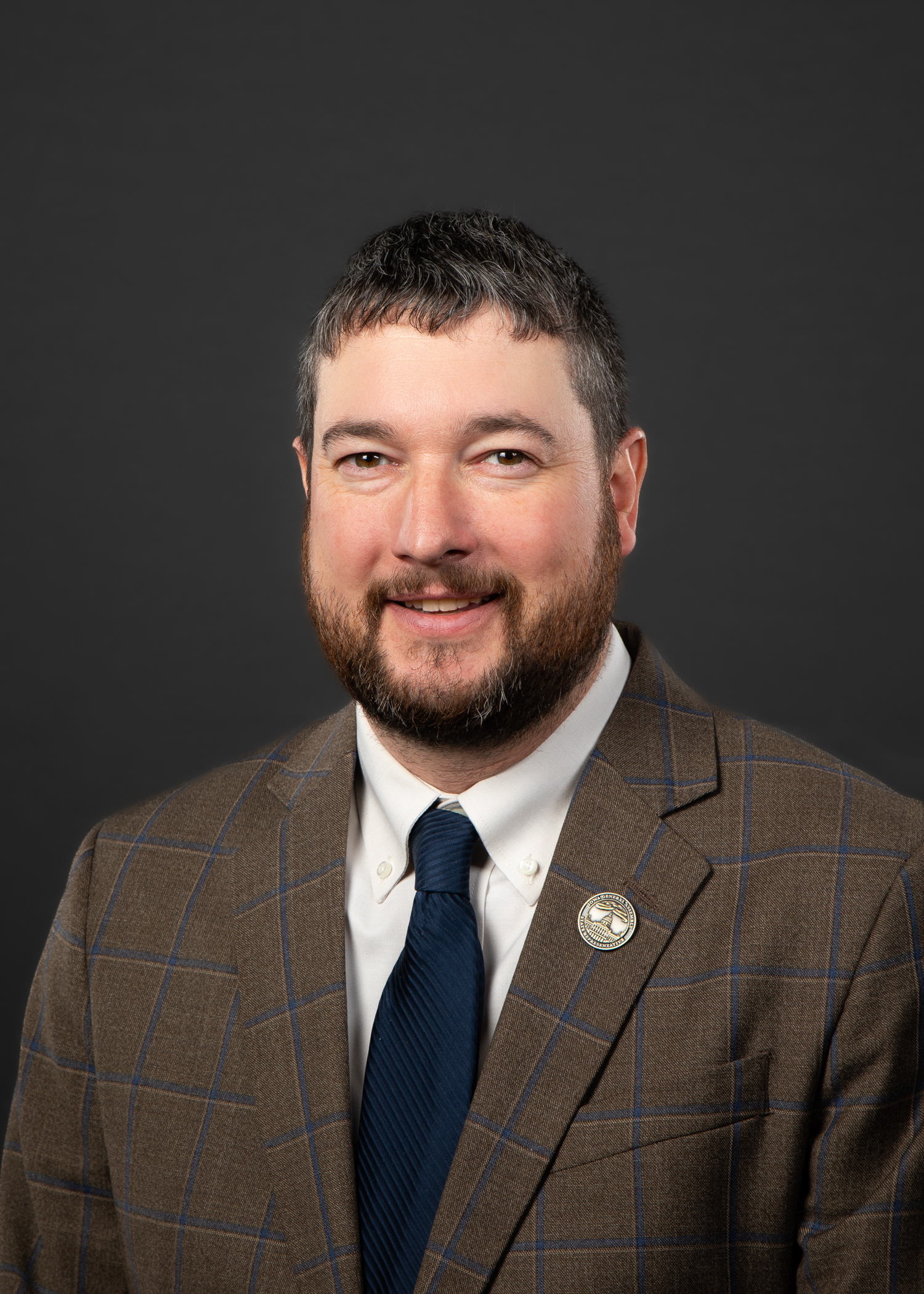
- Official portrait, 2023

Member of the Iowa House of Representatives from the 76th district
- Incumbent
- Assumed office January 9, 2023
- Preceded by: Dave Maxwell
- Succeeded by: Matt Reisetter (elect)

Personal details
- Born: 1981 or 1982 (age 44–45) Hudson, Iowa, U.S.
- Party: Republican
- Spouse: Dresden Wulf (m. 2007)
- Children: 2
- Education: Iowa State University (BS)

Derek Wulf (born 1981) is an American politician serving as the representative for the 76th district in the Iowa House of Representatives since 2023. He is a member of the Republican Party.

Wulf was the Republican nominee for lieutenant governor of Iowa in the 2026 Iowa gubernatorial election, running alongside Zach Lahn.

== Early life ==
Wulf graduated from Hudson High School in Hudson, Iowa, and earned a bachelor's of science degree in animal science at Iowa State University. He then worked on the family farm. He married his wife, Dresden, in 2007. At the time of his first state legislative campaign, the couple had two children.

== Political career ==
District 76 of the Iowa House of Representatives had become an open seat following redistricting, when Dean Fisher was drawn out of the seat and Dave Williams decided not to run. Wulf defeated Tony Chavez in the June 2022 Republican Party primary. He won the general election against Democratic Party candidate Kate Wyatt. During the 2022 election cycle, a concern about Wulf's residency in House District 76 was raised by Kimberly Karol to the Iowa Ethics and Campaign Disclosure Board, which ultimately dismissed the complaint.

In early September, The Des Moines Register reported that the Black Hawk County Sheriff's Office was investigating Wulf for theft and fraud in relation to accusations that Wulf had misled lenders and business associates about his finances.

=== Committee assignments ===
- Agriculture (chair)
- Natural Resources
- State Government
- Ways and Means
- Agriculture and Natural Resources Appropriations Subcommittee

Party political offices
Preceded by Adam Gregg	Republican nominee for Lieutenant Governor of Iowa; 2026	Most recent
