= Kim Reynolds =

Governor of Iowa since 2017

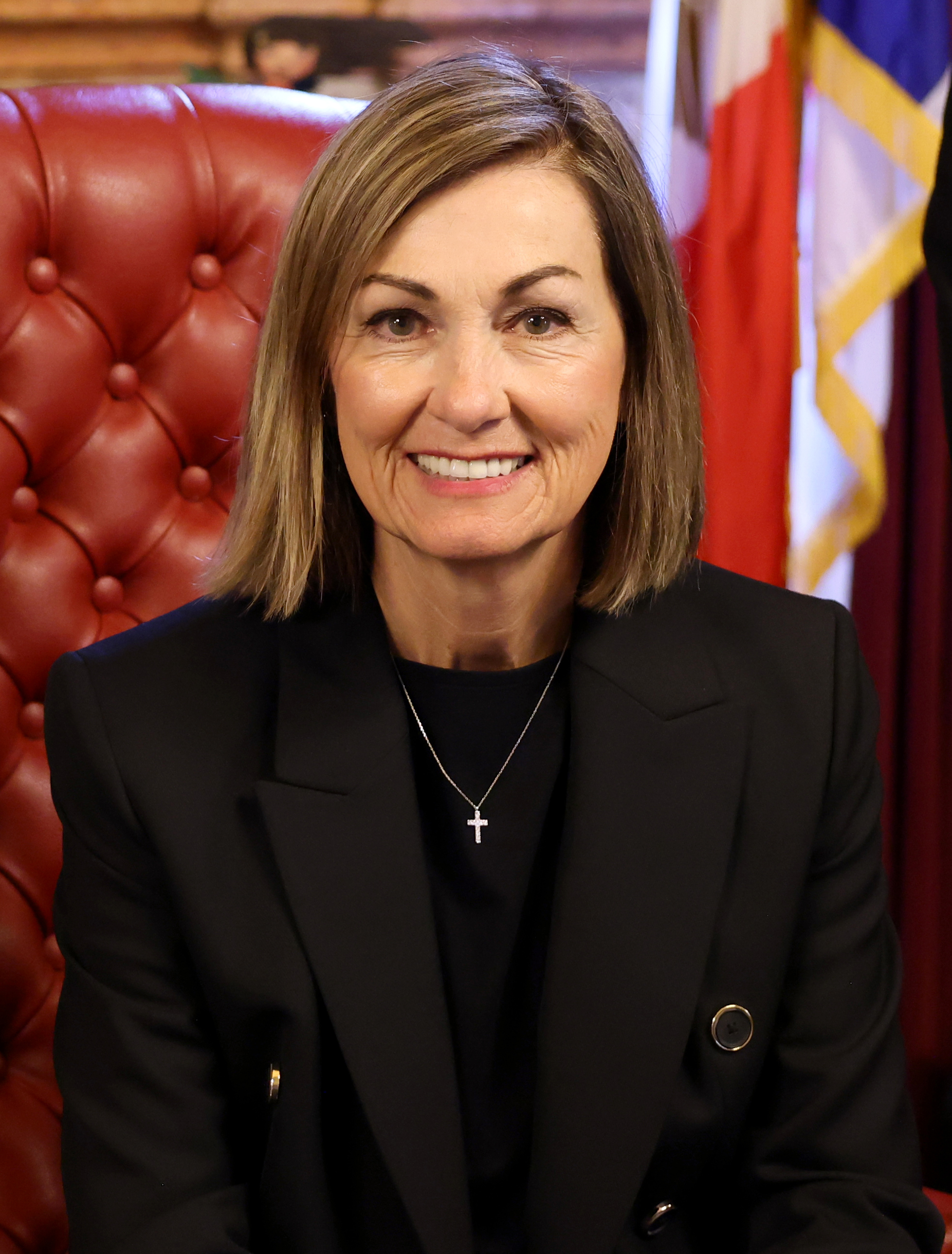
- Reynolds in 2026

43rd Governor of Iowa
- Incumbent
- Assumed office May 24, 2017
- Lieutenant: Adam Gregg; Amy Sinclair (acting); Chris Cournoyer
- Preceded by: Terry Branstad

Chair of the Republican Governors Association
- In office November 17, 2022 – December 7, 2023
- Preceded by: Doug Ducey; Pete Ricketts
- Succeeded by: Bill Lee

46th Lieutenant Governor of Iowa
- In office January 14, 2011 – May 24, 2017
- Governor: Terry Branstad
- Preceded by: Patty Judge
- Succeeded by: Adam Gregg

56th Chair of the National Lieutenant Governors Association
- In office 2015–2016
- Preceded by: Nancy Wyman
- Succeeded by: Dan McKee

Member of the Iowa Senate from the 48th district
- In office January 11, 2009 – January 2, 2011
- Preceded by: Jeff Angelo
- Succeeded by: Joni Ernst

Personal details
- Born: Kimberly Kay Strawn; August 4, 1959 (age 67) St. Charles, Iowa, U.S.
- Party: Republican
- Spouse: Kevin Reynolds (m. 1982)
- Children: 3
- Education: Northwest Missouri State University (attended); Upper Iowa University (attended); Iowa State University (BLS)
- Website: Campaign website
- Reynolds's voice Reynolds on the response to the COVID-19 pandemic in Iowa. Recorded May 6, 2020

Kimberly Kay Reynolds (née Strawn; born August 4, 1959) is an American politician serving since 2017 as the 43rd governor of Iowa. A member of the Republican Party, she is the first female governor in Iowa history.

Reynolds was elected Clarke County treasurer in 1994 and served for four terms in that office. She then served a partial term in the Iowa Senate from 2009 to 2011. From 2011 to 2017, Reynolds served as the 46th lieutenant governor of Iowa. She became governor in May 2017 when Governor Terry Branstad stepped down to become the United States ambassador to China. Reynolds won a full term as governor in 2018 and was reelected in 2022.

Reynolds has signed legislation providing for educational vouchers as well as legislation supporting voting rights for felons and Second Amendment rights. Reynolds received poor approval ratings in 2020 for her handling of the COVID-19 pandemic. She has a close relationship with the Iowa pork industry. Reynolds delivered the Republican response to President Joe Biden's 2022 State of the Union Address. In 2023, she signed a six-week abortion ban into law, and in 2025, she signed a bill repealing anti-discrimination protections for transgender people, making Iowa the first state to remove anti-discrimination protections for any group of people.

On April 11, 2025, Reynolds announced she would not seek reelection in 2026.

== Early life and education ==
Reynolds was born Kimberly Kay Strawn in 1959 in St. Charles, Iowa. She graduated from high school at the Interstate 35 Community School District in 1977.

Reynolds attended Northwest Missouri State University, taking classes in business, consumer sciences and clothing sales and design, without earning a degree. She later took classes at Southeastern Community College in the late 1980s, and then accounting classes at Southwestern Community College between 1992 and 1995.

In 2012, Reynolds began taking classes in the bachelor of public administration program at Upper Iowa University.

In December 2016, shortly before Reynolds became governor, Iowa State University awarded her a Bachelor of Liberal Studies degree with three concentrations: political science, business management, and communications.

== Early political career ==
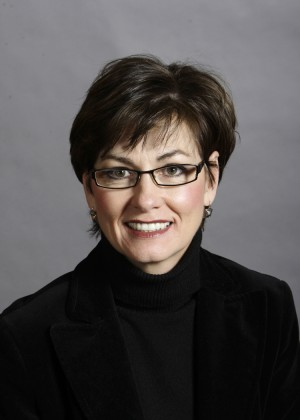
Reynolds during her time in the Iowa Senate

Reynolds was elected Clarke County treasurer in 1994 and served four terms. While she was treasurer she was selected to join the American Council of Young Political Leaders on a trip to Taipei, Taiwan.

On November 4, 2008, Reynolds was elected to represent the 48th district in the Iowa Senate, defeating Democratic nominee Ruth Smith and independent candidate Rodney Schmidt. In 2010, Reynolds endorsed a ban on same-sex marriage in Iowa.

== Lieutenant governor of Iowa (2011–2017) ==
On June 25, 2010, Republican gubernatorial nominee Terry Branstad publicly selected Reynolds to be his running mate as the lieutenant governor candidate. The next day, she received the Republican nomination at the Republican state convention. On November 2, 2010, the Branstad/Reynolds ticket won the general election. Reynolds resigned her Senate seat on November 12 before taking office as lieutenant governor.

Reynolds was sworn in as lieutenant governor of Iowa on January 14, 2011. She co-chaired the Governor's Science, Technology, Engineering and Math (STEM) Advisory Council, Iowa Partnership for Economic Progress board, and the Military Children Education Coalition. She was also Branstad's representative on the board of the Iowa State Fair.

Reynolds was elected chair of the National Lieutenant Governors Association (NLGA) in July 2015.

== Governor of Iowa (2017–present) ==
On May 24, 2017, Reynolds became governor of Iowa upon the resignation of Branstad, who stepped down to become United States Ambassador to China. She is Iowa's first female governor.

=== Elections ===
==== 2018 ====
In June 2017, Reynolds said she would seek a full term as governor of Iowa in the 2018 election.

Reynolds's decision to have Representative Steve King co-chair her campaign stirred controversy, as King has a history of remarks that have been described as racist. The Des Moines Register editorial board wrote, "Gov. Kim Reynolds has kept him on as her campaign co-chairman, while muttering increasingly thin-lipped denials that she agrees with his ideological extremism." Reynolds had previously praised King, saying he was "a strong defender of freedom and our conservative values". After Election Day, Reynolds criticized King and said that he needed to change his approach.

Reynolds won the Republican nomination for governor and defeated Democrat Fred Hubbell and Libertarian Jake Porter in the general election, 50% to 48%. She won nearly the entire state west of Des Moines. In particular, she dominated the state's 4th congressional district, which she carried with 59% of the vote. Reynolds is the first woman elected governor of Iowa.

==== 2022 ====
Reynolds was reelected to a second full term, defeating Democratic nominee Deidre DeJear, 58% to 40%.

=== First term ===
Reynolds's elevation to the governorship created a vacancy in the office of lieutenant governor. Reports indicated that Reynolds's selection of a lieutenant governor could be challenged in the Iowa Supreme Court. An opinion from the Attorney General of Iowa indicated that "an individual promoted from lieutenant governor to governor, as was Reynolds, [did] not have the authority to appoint a new lieutenant governor." On May 25, 2017, Reynolds announced that Iowa Public Defender Adam Gregg would serve as acting lieutenant governor; to avoid litigation, the Reynolds administration stated that Gregg "[would] not hold the official position of lieutenant governor" and would not succeed Reynolds in the event of her inability to serve as governor.

In 2018, Reynolds proposed cutting $10 million from Medicaid, which cares for eligible low-income adults, children, pregnant women, elderly adults and people with disabilities. In 2020, she proposed a one-cent increase in the state sales tax (bringing it to 8 cents), offset by a phased reduction in the state income tax, including a cut in the rate for the top bracket from 9% to 5.5%. Reynolds's proposed restructuring of the state tax code would represent a further reduction in income taxes, going beyond 2018 legislation (passed by Republicans in the state legislature and signed into law by Reynolds) that was the largest income tax cut in Iowa history. Her proposed sales-tax increase, however, was largely opposed by state legislators.

In 2018, after the U.S. Supreme Court's decision in Obergefell v. Hodges (2015), Reynolds called same-sex marriage a "settled" issue and said that she did not consider herself obligated to follow the Iowa Republican Party platform provision against same-sex marriage.

Reynolds has supported some of Donald Trump's positions. She blocked two-thirds of requests from Democratic state Attorney General Tom Miller to join multi-state lawsuits challenging Trump administration policies or to submit amicus briefs in such suits; among the vetoed requests were proposals to challenge Trump policies related to immigration, asylum, abortion, birth control, environmental deregulation, gun policy, and LGBT rights. Reynolds blocked Miller from including Iowa in a legal challenge to the Trump administration's repeal of the Clean Power Plan, an Obama-era regulation that restricted emissions of greenhouses gases (such as carbon) to counteract climate change. In 2018, she acknowledged that Trump's trade and tariff policies were hurting American farmers (as agriculture exports declined due to tariffs imposed by other nations in retaliation for Trump's tariffs), but then claimed that farmers would ultimately benefit. Reynolds made campaign appearances with Trump during the 2020 presidential campaign; in the November election, Trump carried Iowa, but lost nationally to Joe Biden, who won both the electoral vote and the national popular vote. After Trump's loss, Reynolds did not denounce Trump's false claims of election fraud and refused to acknowledge Biden's victory until January 2021, when Congress formally counted the electoral votes. She condemned the storming of the Capitol, which disrupted the counting of the electoral votes, but said many people believed the election was "not valid".

In May 2018, Reynolds signed a bill to revamp Iowa's energy efficiency policies. Also in May 2018, she signed a "fetal heartbeat bill", one of the nation's most restrictive abortion bans. In January 2019, an Iowa state judge struck the law down as unconstitutional. Reynolds chose not to appeal, saying she did not believe that "a losing legal battle" would advance the anti-abortion cause. She has repeatedly called for an amendment to the state constitution to the effect that it does not protect abortion rights; such an amendment would overturn a 2019 Iowa Supreme Court decision concluding that the state constitution does protect the right to an abortion. In 2021, Reynolds signed into law a bill that required women getting abortion to wait for 24 hours; an Iowa court struck the law down.

=== Second term ===
Reynolds began her first full term on January 18, 2019. In March 2019, she signed into law a bill requiring public universities to protect all speech on campus. Through her judicial appointments, Reynolds shifted the Iowa Supreme Court to the right. Her attorney, Sam Langholz, was appointed to a position in the attorney general's office to defend her policies in court.

In December 2019, Reynolds launched an anti-vaping social media campaign in an effort to reduce vaping among Iowa youth. In July 2020, she signed legislation that raised the minimum legal age to buy tobacco products, including vaping products, to 21.

From 2017 to April 2020, Reynolds restored the voting rights of 543 felons, more than the roughly 200 restorations that her predecessor gave over almost seven years in office. In August 2020, she signed an executive order permitting felons to vote in Iowa elections upon completing their sentence. Iowa previously imposed a lifetime ban on felons voting unless the governor personally restored their voting rights, the strictest law in the country. Explaining her order, Reynolds referred to her experiences two decades earlier, when she twice pleaded guilty to DUI and subsequently recovered from alcoholism, an experience she cites as an important turning point in her life.

Reynolds has a close relationship with the Iowa pork industry, and in particular with Iowa Select Farms, one of the country's largest pork producers. She donated an afternoon of her time as part of a 2019 charity auction to benefit the company's owners' foundation; the owners had contributed almost $300,000 to Reynolds's campaigns. A Republican donor who is influential in the pork industry placed the winning bid. The director of the Iowa Ethics and Campaign Disclosure Board said that he did not believe the auction violated state law, but attorneys for two former Democratic governors of Iowa said that it created the appearance of impropriety and was an error in judgment. In May and July 2020, Reynolds's administration arranged for COVID-19 testing to be done at Iowa Select's West Des Moines headquarters and at the Waverly facility partly owned by another campaign donor, at a time when those most vulnerable to the disease (healthcare workers and residents of nursing homes and other congregate-living facilities) were unable to timely get tested. A separate pork production company that had donated $25,000 to Reynolds's campaign received a disproportionate benefit from a state pandemic business-aid program, receiving 72% of the program's initial rounds of disbursements. After the testing came to light in January 2021, Polk County Supervisor Matt McCoy criticized Reynolds, and State Auditor Rob Sand began an investigation into whether special treatment was accorded to political donors over essential workers and vulnerable persons. In 2023, Reynolds signed legislation to strip the state auditor's powers. In 2025, she joined a letter opposing 2018 California Proposition 12 and supporting the Save Our Bacon Act (H.R. 4673).

In March 2021, Reynolds signed into law a bill that shortened the hours of polling places on Election Day, reduced the early voting period, and required that absentee ballots be received by ballot places before the end of Election Day. She said the legislation would protect election integrity. It was part of a wider effort by Republicans across the country to roll back voting access. Democrats won the 2020 presidential election, with Trump and many other Republicans making false claims of fraud.

On April 2, 2021, Reynolds signed a bill allowing individuals to purchase and carry handguns without a permit, a policy known as constitutional carry. Later that month, she signed legislation that would allow landlords to reject tenants who pay rent with Section 8 vouchers.

Reynolds signed SF 542 to loosen child labor laws and sent the U.S. Secretary of Labor a letter that said: "I am writing on behalf of small businesses across Iowa that are facing excessive fines due to the U.S. Department of Labor's enforcement of youth labor laws." In 2025, she signed HF 889, enacting paid family leave for state employees.

==== COVID-19 pandemic ====
During the COVID-19 pandemic, Reynolds opposed face mask mandates. She signed a Proclamation of Disaster Emergency on March 9, 2020. Also that month, she ordered closures of some recreational businesses and additional school closures and ordered a halt to "non-essential" or elective surgeries, including surgical abortions, but implemented no stay-at-home orders. In April 2020, Iowa health officials advised Reynolds to enforce face coverings and not ease restrictions. In response, she took the stance that it was better to reopen the economy and encourage people to be responsible and wear masks. Reynolds did not implement a requirement to wear masks in public places until after the November 2020 election, when she ordered the mandatory wearing of masks at large gatherings. In June, recreational businesses such as bars and restaurants were permitted to fully reopen, which was followed by surges in coronavirus infections. Reynolds said that the effectiveness of face masks in halting the virus's spread was not settled, although doctors and scientists nearly unanimously held that wearing masks in public substantially reduced viral transmission, and their use was recommended by the World Health Organization (WHO), Centers for Disease Control and Prevention (CDC), and Iowa's own Department of Health. In the absence of any evidence of her contention, in July 2020, Reynolds said that Iowa localities' mask mandates were "not appropriate" and unlawful, and she sought to block them, making Iowa one of the only U.S. states lacking any enforceable local or state mask mandates. Iowa City's mayor rejected Reynolds's claim and issued a municipal order requiring the use of face coverings in indoor public places. He cited the state constitution's home-rule authority and a state statute that grants mayors powers during a time of "emergency or public danger".

In April 2020, on the advice of native Iowan actor and entrepreneur Ashton Kutcher, Reynolds signed a $26 million, no-bid contract with Utah startup Nomi Health to develop a COVID-19 testing program called TestIowa. She was eventually sued for refusing to release public records related to the program, which was plagued with errors.

In July 2020, Reynolds said she would invalidate some school districts' plans to limit in-person classes to one day a week for most students, with online learning on other days, overriding local school districts and requiring students to spend at least half of their schooling in classrooms. The state teachers' union, the Iowa State Education Association, criticized her move. Iowa public school teachers began sending Reynolds their obituaries in protest. Despite the outcry from teachers, who noted that social distancing was often impossible in school settings and that many teachers had not yet been vaccinated, in late January 2021 Reynolds signed a bill, passed by the state legislature along party lines, that required school districts to provide full-time in-person classes upon parents' request.

In 2020, Reynolds had the lowest approval rating of any governor in the nation for her handling of the COVID-19 pandemic, with an approval rating of 28% in July and 26% in September. COVID-19 in Iowa peaked in November 2020, but remained high into the next year. In late January 2021, the state had the nation's third-highest positivity rate and third-lowest per capita vaccination rate.

In September 2020, the Reynolds administration broke with the CDC's quarantine guidelines, revoking guidelines recommending that people exposed to the virus quarantine for 14 days, "if the infected person and close contacts were wearing masks properly". In October 2020, she appeared at an indoor fundraiser for the Republican Party and a large rally in a hangar for President Trump; attendees did not wear masks or socially distance at the events.

In November 2020, Reynolds issued a statewide mask mandate, ordering anyone over age 2 to wear a mask in indoor public spaces, a reversal of her previous claim that face masks are ineffective. When issuing the order, Reynolds said, "No one wants to do this. I don't want to do this", adding, "If Iowans don't buy into this, we'll lose. Businesses will close once again, more schools will be forced to go online, and our health care system will fail."

In February 2021, Reynolds rolled back mask requirements in indoor public places and restrictions on indoor dining. She did so without consulting with experts at the Iowa Department of Public Health. The CDC had urged states not to loosen their COVID-19 public health measures.

In March 2021, Reynolds voiced her opposition to the American Rescue Plan Act of 2021, saying it would "provide bigger checks to states who chose aggressive shutdowns and mismanaged their state budgets." In September 2021, she touted $100 million in funding for Iowa's water infrastructure that was funded by the bill.

In May 2021, Reynolds signed into law a bill that prohibited businesses and local governments from requiring customers to have proof of vaccination. She also signed into law a bill that prohibited school districts from requiring masks.

=== Third term ===
On March 1, 2022, Reynolds was selected to deliver the Republican response to President Biden's State of the Union address. On March 3, 2022, she signed into law a bill that bans transgender girls and women from participating on designated female sports teams. In January 2023, Reynolds signed the Students First Act, which made private school vouchers available in Iowa for the first time. On March 22, 2023, she signed a law banning the prescription of puberty blockers, cross-sex hormones, and gender-affirming surgery to minors, as well as a law prohibiting people from using school restrooms that do not align with their sex at birth.

In November 2023, Reynolds endorsed Ron DeSantis for the 2024 Republican Party presidential primaries, saying she did not believe Trump could win the general election. She said she would endorse the Republican nominee and endorsed Trump in March 2024. Around this time, a survey found that Reynolds had the lowest approval rating of any U.S. governor.

In 2024, Reynolds signed a bill allowing state law enforcement to arrest undocumented migrants if they had previously been deported from or denied admission to the United States. The bill also enables state courts to issue deportation orders for such individuals. On February 1, 2024, she introduced a bill defining "man" and "woman" based on reproductive anatomy and requiring that official identification documents list sex at birth.

On February 28, 2025, Reynolds signed Senate File 418, which eliminated gender identity as a protected class from the Iowa Civil Rights Act. This made Iowa the first U.S. state to remove gender identity as a protected class from a civil rights law.

On April 11, 2025, Reynolds announced she will not seek reelection in 2026.

== Personal life ==
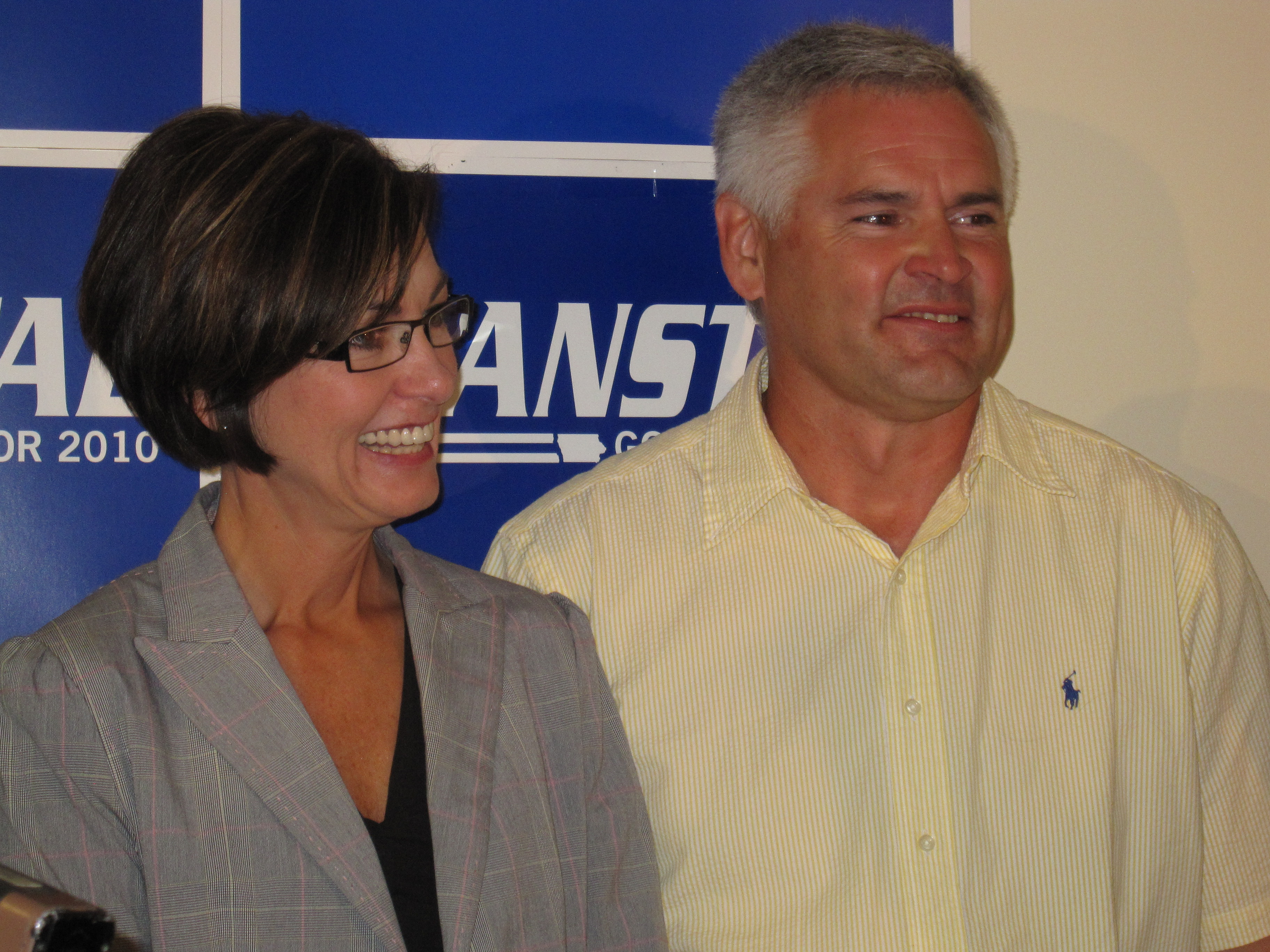
Reynolds with husband Kevin Reynolds in 2010

Kim Reynolds married Kevin Reynolds in 1982. They have three children.

Kevin Reynolds was diagnosed with lung cancer in September 2023. His cancer went into remission, but recurred in October 2026. He also had a tumor removed from his brain.

Reynolds attends the Lutheran Church of Hope.

Reynolds was twice charged with driving under the influence of alcohol, in 1999 and in August 2000. In 2000, she was initially charged with Second Offense DUI, but was allowed to plead guilty to a misdemeanor. In 2017, Reynolds said she had sought inpatient treatment for alcoholism after her second arrest and had been sober for nearly 17 years.

== Electoral history ==
Iowa State Senate District 48 Republican Primary Election, 2008
Party	Candidate	Votes	%
Republican	Kim Reynolds	2,487	61.77
Republican	Jim Parker	1,539	38.23
Total votes		4,026	100.0

Iowa State Senate District 48 General Election, 2008
Party	Candidate	Votes	%
Republican	Kim Reynolds	14,274	52.97
Democratic	Ruth Smith	11,653	43.24
Independent	Rodney Schmidt	1,021	3.79
Total votes		26,948	100.0

Iowa Gubernatorial Election, 2010
Party	Candidate	Votes	%
Republican	Terry Branstad Kim Reynolds	592,494	52.8
Democratic	Chet Culver (incumbent) Patty Judge (incumbent)	484,798	43.2
Iowa Party	Jonathan Narcisse; Richard Marlar	20,859	1.9
Libertarian	Eric Cooper Nick Weltha	14,398	1.3
Independent	Gregory Hughes Robin Prior-Calef	3,884	0.4
Socialist Workers	David Rosenfeld Helen Meyers	2,757	0.3
Write-in		2823	0.3
Total votes		1,133,430	100.0

Iowa Gubernatorial Election, 2014
Party	Candidate	Votes	%
Republican	Terry Branstad (incumbent) Kim Reynolds (incumbent)	666,032	58.99
Democratic	Jack Hatch Monica Vernon	420,787	37.27
Libertarian	Lee Deakins Hieb Tim Watson	20,321	1.80
New Independent Party Iowa	Jim Hennager Mary Margaret Krieg	10,582	0.94
Iowa Party	Jonathan R. Narcisse; Michael L. Richards	10,240	0.91
Write-in		1095	0.09
Total votes		1,129,057	100.0

Iowa Gubernatorial Election, 2018
Party	Candidate	Votes	%
Republican	Kim Reynolds Adam Gregg	667,275	50.26
Democratic	Fred Hubbell Rita Hart	630,986	47.53
Libertarian	Jake Porter Lynne Gentry	21,426	1.61
Clear Water Party of Iowa	Gary Siegwarth; Natalia Blaskovich	7,463	0.56
Write-in		488	0.04
Total votes		1,327,638	100.0

Iowa Gubernatorial Election, 2022
Party	Candidate	Votes	%
Republican	Kim Reynolds (incumbent) Adam Gregg (incumbent)	709,198	58.04
Democratic	Deidre DeJear Eric Van Lacker	482,950	39.53
Libertarian	Rick Stewart Marco Battaglia	28,998	2.37
Write-in		718	0.06
Total votes		1,220,864	100.0

== See also ==
- List of female governors in the United States
- List of female lieutenant governors in the United States

== Notes ==
Party political offices
Preceded by Bob Vander Plaats	Republican nominee for Lieutenant Governor of Iowa; 2010, 2014	Succeeded by Adam Gregg
Preceded by Terry Branstad	Republican nominee for Governor of Iowa; 2018, 2022	Succeeded by Zach Lahn
Preceded by Tim Scott	Response to the State of the Union address 2022	Succeeded by Sarah Huckabee Sanders
Preceded by Doug Ducey; Pete Ricketts	Chair of the Republican Governors Association; 2022–2023	Succeeded by Bill Lee
Political offices
Preceded by Patty Judge	Lieutenant Governor of Iowa; 2011–2017	Succeeded by Adam Gregg
Preceded by Terry Branstad	Governor of Iowa; 2017–present	Incumbent
U.S. order of precedence (ceremonial)
Preceded by JD Vance as Vice President	Order of precedence of the United States; Within Iowa	Succeeded by Mayor of city in which event is held
Preceded by JD Vance as Vice President	Order of precedence of the United States; Within Iowa	Succeeded by Otherwise Mike Johnson as Speaker of the House
Preceded by Greg Abbott as Governor of Texas	Order of precedence of the United States; Outside Iowa	Succeeded by Tony Evers as Governor of Wisconsin
