= 2014 Iowa State Auditor election =

- November 4, 2014
Nominee	Mary Mosiman	Jonathan Neiderbach
Party	Republican	Democratic
Popular vote	604,103	456,525
Percentage	56.87%	42.98%
- Mosiman: 50–60% 60–70% 70–80% 80–90% Neiderbach: 50–60% 60–70%
State Auditor before election
Mary Mosiman
Republican
Elected State Auditor
Mary Mosiman
Republican

The 2014 Iowa State Auditor election was held on November 4, 2014, to elect the Iowa Auditor of State, concurrently with elections to the United States Senate, U.S. House of Representatives, governor, and other state and local elections. Primary elections were held on June 3, 2014.

Incumbent Republican state auditor David A. Vaudt resigned on May 3, 2013, to become chairman of the Governmental Accounting Standards Board. Governor Terry Branstad appointed former Story County auditor Mary Mosiman on May 13, 2013, to fill the vacancy until the 2014 election cycle, becoming the first female state auditor in state history.

Mosiman ran for election to her first full term in office, defeating former Des Moines School Board member Jonathan Neiderbach in the general election.

== Republican primary ==
=== Candidates ===
==== Nominee ====
- Mary Mosiman, incumbent state auditor (2013–present) and former auditor of Story County (2001–2010)

=== Results ===
Republican primary results
Party	Candidate	Votes	%
Republican	Mary Mosiman (incumbent)	115,393	99.62
Write-in		435	0.38
Invalid or blank votes		46,498	28.64
Total votes		162,326	100.0

== Democratic primary ==
=== Candidates ===
==== Nominee ====
- Jonathan Neiderbach, former legislative analyst and former Des Moines School Board member

=== Results ===
Democratic primary results
Party	Candidate	Votes	%
Democratic	Jonathan Neiderbach	55,468	99.53
Write-in		262	0.47
Invalid or blank votes		16,647	23.00
Total votes		72,377	100.0

== General election ==
=== Polling ===
Poll source	Date(s) administered	Sample size (Note: Key: A – all adults RV – registered voters LV – likely voters V – unclear)	Margin of error	Mary Mosiman (R)	Jonathan Neiderbach (D)	Undecided
Public Policy Polling	November 1–3, 2014	1,265 (LV)	± 2.8%	46%	41%	14%
Loras College	October 21–24, 2014	1,121 (RV)	± 2.93%	37%	30%	30%
Suffolk University/USA Today	October 11–14, 2014	500 (LV)	± 4.4%	40%	35%	25%
Public Policy Polling	September 25–28, 2014	1,192 (LV)	± 2.8%	41%	35%	24%
Suffolk University/USA Today	August 23–26, 2014	500 (LV)	± 4.4%	32%	30%	38%
Public Policy Polling	August 22–24, 2014	915 (LV)	± 3.2%	39%	35%	26%

=== Results ===
2014 Iowa State Auditor election
Party	Candidate	Votes	%
Republican	Mary Mosiman (incumbent)	604,103	56.87
Democratic	Jonathan Neiderbach	456,525	42.98
Write-in		1,477	0.15
Invalid or blank votes		79,935	6.99
Total votes		1,142,040	100.0
Republican hold			

==== By congressional district ====
Mosiman won all four congressional districts, including one that elected a Democrat.

District	Mosiman	Neiderbach	Representative
1st	54%	46%	Rod Blum
2nd	53%	47%	Dave Loebsack
3rd	57%	43%	David Young
4th	65%	35%	Steve King
