= Mosiman =

Mosiman is a surname of Swiss-German origin. Notable people with the name include:

- Billie Sue Mosiman (1947–2018), American author
- Mary Mosiman (born 1962), American politician

== See also ==
- Mosimann, a list of people with the surname
