= 2018 Iowa State Auditor election =

- November 6, 2018
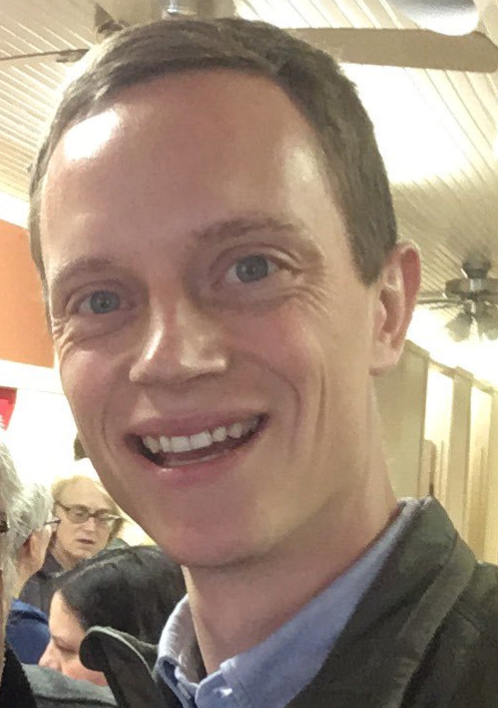

Candidate	Rob Sand	Mary Mosiman
Party	Democratic	Republican
Popular vote	660,169	601,320
Percentage	50.96%	46.42%
- Sand: 40-50% 50–60% 60–70% 70–80% Mosiman: 40–50% 50–60% 60–70% 70–80% 80–90%
Auditor of State before election
Mary Mosiman
Republican
Elected Auditor of State
Rob Sand
Democratic

The 2018 Iowa State Auditor election was held on November 6, 2018, to elect the Iowa Auditor of State, concurrently with elections to the United States House of Representatives, governor, and other state and local elections. Primary elections were held on June 5, 2018.

Incumbent Republican auditor Mary Mosiman ran for election to a second full term in office, but was defeated by Democratic attorney and former assistant attorney general Rob Sand. Sand outraised Mosiman throughout the campaign with what was generally considered record fundraising. Sand was the only Democrat that was not an incumbent that won statewide office in 2018. Sand became the first Democrat to win a state auditor's race in Iowa since 1964, when Lorne R. Worthington won a single term.

== Republican primary ==
=== Candidates ===
==== Nominee ====
- Mary Mosiman, incumbent state auditor (2013–present) and former auditor of Story County (2001–2010)

=== Results ===
Republican primary results
Party	Candidate	Votes	%
Republican	Mary Mosiman (incumbent)	85,207	81.01%
Write-in		278	0.27%
Rejected ballots		19,698	18.72%
Total votes		105,183	100.0%

== Democratic primary ==
=== Candidates ===
==== Nominee ====
- Rob Sand, attorney and former Assistant Attorney General of Iowa (2010–2017)

=== Results ===
Democratic primary results
Party	Candidate	Votes	%
Democratic	Rob Sand	147,840	80.90%
Write-in		550	0.30%
Rejected ballots		34,346	18.80%
Total votes		182,736	100.0%

== General election ==
=== Results ===
2018 Iowa State Auditor election
Party	Candidate	Votes	%
Democratic	Rob Sand	660,169	50.96
Republican	Mary Mosiman (incumbent)	601,320	46.42
Libertarian	Fred Perryman	33,421	2.58
Write-in		458	0.04
Total votes		1,295,368	100.0
Democratic gain from Republican			

==== By congressional district ====
Sand won three of four congressional districts.

District	Mosiman	Sand	Representative
1st	42%	55%	Rod Blum (115th Congress)
1st	42%	55%	Abby Finkenauer (116th Congress)
2nd	44%	54%	Dave Loebsack
3rd	45%	52%	David Young (115th Congress)
3rd	45%	52%	Cindy Axne (116th Congress)
4th	55%	42%	Steve King

== See also ==
- 2018 Iowa elections
- Iowa Auditor of State
