= James E. Thomas (Iowa auditor) =

American politician (1894–1984)

J. E. Thomas

Deputy Iowa State Treasurer
- In office January 21, 1925 – January 1927
- Preceded by: Gillet Haynes
- Succeeded by: Katherine Southworth

22nd Iowa State Auditor
- In office September 1, 1924 – January 1, 1925
- Governor: Nathan E. Kendall
- Preceded by: Glenn C. Haynes
- Succeeded by: James C. McClune

Deputy Iowa State Auditor
- In office January 1921 – September 1, 1924

Personal details
- Born: James Emmert Thomas; February 23, 1894 Anthon, Iowa
- Died: January 8, 1984 (aged 89) Des Moines, Iowa
- Party: Republican
- Spouse(s): Grace Leola Hewitt (m. 1919; div. 1934) Bessie Ferne Shiffer (m. 1936; died 1953) Beatrice M. Hill (m. 1968)
- Children: 4
- Education: University of Iowa

Military service
- Branch: Iowa National Guard; US Army
- Service years: 1912-1953
- Rank: Brigadier General
- Unit: 168th Infantry Regiment; 42nd Infantry Division; American Expeditionary Forces
- Battles/wars: Mexican Border War; World War I

James E. Thomas (February 23, 1894 – January 8, 1984) was the Iowa State Auditor from 1924 to 1925.

== Early life ==
He was born in 1894 to Dr Louis A. Thomas and Adelia (Gregg) Thomas in Anthon. They moved to Red Oak when Thomas was young and he eventually graduated from Red Oak Highschool.

== Military career ==
After high school, he enlisted as a private joining Company M of the 168th Infantry Regiment in the Iowa National Guard. His service began during the Mexican Border War. He would rise to be a Sergeant Major, Captain, one of the youngest Majors, and one of the youngest Lieutenant Colonels. He was Major of the 42nd Division while in France during World War I. By the end of his career, he would be a Brigadier General. During World War II, he was a procurement officer for the Iowa Selective Service office.

At the end of the war, he attended the University of Iowa.

== Political career ==
=== State Auditor ===
He was appointed Deputy Auditor of Iowa in 1921. He served in this position until September 1924, when Auditor Glenn Haynes resigned to take a position as Executive Secretary of the Iowa Good Roads association. Thomas became Iowa Auditor of State for the remaining 4 months of Haynes' term.

=== State Treasurer ===
He served as Deputy State Treasurer from January 21, 1925 until January 1927.

== Personal life ==
Thomas married three times.

He married his first wife, Grace Leola Hewitt, on July 23, 1919, in Red Oak. They divorced in June 1934. She died on March 26, 1972 in Red Oak. They had 2 sons and 2 daughters.

He married his second wife, Bessie Ferne Shiffer, on March 26, 1936, in Grimes. She died on July 3, 1953, at Camp Dodge at age 47.

He married his third wife, Beatrice M. Hall, on March 28, 1968, in Omaha. She died on November 2, 2001 in Urbandale.

Thomas died of a heart issue at the Veterans Administration Hospital in Des Moines on January 8, 1984.

Preceded by Glenn C. Haynes	Iowa State Auditor; 1924-1925	Succeeded by James C. McClune
