= Frederick Porter =

Frederick or Fred Porter may refer to:

- F. W. Porter (Frederick William Porter, 1821–1901), British/Irish architect
- Frederic Hutchinson Porter (1890–1976), American architect
- Frederick Charles Porter (1832–1869), Australian miner and explorer
- Fred L. Porter (1877–1938), American farmer and politician from New York
- C. Fred Porter (1883–1971), acting Iowa state auditor
