= Mosimann =

Mosimann is a surname. Notable people with the surname include:

- Anton Mosimann (born 1947), Swiss chef and restaurateur
- Quentin Mosimann (born 1988), Swiss DJ and record producer
- Roli Mosimann, Swiss musician and record producer
- Thomas Mosimann, Swiss slalom canoeist

== See also ==
- Billie Sue Mosiman (1947–2018), American author
- Mary Mosiman (born 1962), American politician
