= James W. Long =

American politician (1873-1966)

J. W. Long

24th Iowa State Auditor
- In office January 1, 1927 – April 21, 1932
- Governor: John Hammill; Dan W. Turner
- Preceded by: James C. McClune
- Succeeded by: C. Fred Porter

Decatur County Supervisor
- In office 1907–1913

Personal details
- Born: James Wilson Long; June 26, 1873 Ellston, Ringgold County, Iowa
- Died: March 24, 1966 (aged 92) Palo Alto, California
- Party: Republican
- Spouse: Emma M. Laney (m. 1898)
- Children: 4
- Education: Simpson College; Western Normal College

James Wilson Long (June 26, 1873 – March 24, 1966) was the Iowa State Auditor from 1927 to 1932.

== Early life ==
Long was born in 1873 in Ellston, Iowa to Lewis Trescott Long and Elizabeth S. (Smith) Long. He graduated from Simpson College. Then in 1896, he graduated from Western Normal College in Shenandoah, Iowa.

He then taught for two years, then as Superintendent of City Schools for another five years.

== Political career ==
In 1906, he was elected as County Supervisor in Decatur. He was re-elected in 1908 and 1910. In 1916, he moved to Ames. He was a traveling salesman, selling county supplies until 1926.

=== State Auditor ===
==== Elections ====
In June 1926, Long ran against incumbent J. C. McClune in the primary election. Long won 155,670 votes against McClune's 147,317 votes. In November, Long ran as a Republican for Iowa State Auditor against Democrat E. J. Riegel and Commonwealth Land party candidate Alfred Phelps in the general election. Long won 353,643 votes against Riegel's 135,671 votes. He was then elected as Iowa State Auditor and sworn in on January 1, 1927.

In June 1928, Long ran against J. C. McClune, again, and O. C. Burrows in the Republican primary. Long won 138,239 votes against McClune's 80,006 votes and Burrows' 65,005 votes. In November, he ran against Democrat Board of Education Member Anna B. Lawther in the general election. Long won 588,682 votes against Lawther's 305,920 votes.

In June 1930, Long ran against J. H. Strief in the Republican primary. Long won 203,702 votes against Strief's 69,944 votes. In November, he ran against Democrat Charles W. Storms in the general election. Long won 325,272 votes against Storms' 177,239 votes.

==== Audits ====
On May 13, 1929, Long's office began an audit of former Police Judge Paul E. Custer, at the request of the city council.

==== Investigation ====
The commission, formed on February 22, 1932, was composed of former Governor Beryl F. Carroll along with two public accountants, F. J. Harrigan and F. W. Sprung. Carroll was appointed by Governor Turner. They also consulted with Iowa Attorney General John Fletcher and Budget office director Oscar Anderson. Others involved were Edwin C. Thayer, attorney for Long, Assistant Attorney General Carl J. Stephens, attorney for the commission, and Lois Grimm as stenographer. James Risden, Chief of the Bureau of Investigation for the Iowa Department of Justice, assigned three special agents to the investigation. 22 witness were called, with the testimony covering 1,035 pages.

The charges included $4,720.53 worth of misappropriated funds, including personal and political trips and overcharging counties for audits, including Poweshiek County and Hamilton County. It also found that another official, J. V. Lemley, collected $407.27 from the state for political trips. The commission also reported that Long's response to these charges were "...in general not responsive, indefinite, and evasive." The political trips were made between September 24, 1929 and May 21, 1930. Long's family also charged for typing services that could have been done by state employees. No forgeries were detected during the investigation. In Poweshiek County, approved an overpayment settlement, while in Hamilton County, 4 pages were removed from an audit and under charged for an audit by around $1,000.

The commission delivered the report to Governor Turner on April 18, 1932.

==== Suspension, removal and replacement ====
On April 23, 1932, Governor Turner suspended Long from office following the release of a commission report on his activities of misconduct. He was succeeded by C. Fred Porter.

== Personal life ==
He married Emma M. Laney on June 22, 1898, and together had 4 children.

In 1936, they moved to Davis, California, where Long became a real estate and insurance agent.

They were Methodist.

He died in Palo Alto, California on March 24, 1966, at age 92. Emma died on March 15, 1969 in Menlo Park, California, aged 94.

Preceded by James C. McClune	Iowa State Auditor; 1927-1932	Succeeded by C. Fred Porter
