= 2026 Iowa State Auditor election =

- November 3, 2026

Nominee	Taylor Wettach	Chris Cournoyer
Party	Democratic	Republican
Popular vote	666,632	660,159
Percentage	50.2%	49.7%
- Wettach: 50–60% 60–70% 70–80% Cournoyer: 50–60% 60–70% 70–80% 80–90%
State Auditor before election
Rob Sand
Democratic
Elected State Auditor
Taylor Wettach
Democratic

The 2026 Iowa State Auditor election took place on November 3, 2026, to elect the state auditor of Iowa. Incumbent Democratic auditor Rob Sand declined to run for a third term, and instead successfully ran for governor. Primary elections were held on June 2, 2026.

== Democratic primary ==
=== Candidates ===
==== Nominee ====
- Taylor Wettach, attorney (previously ran for U.S. House)

==== Declined ====
- Rob Sand, incumbent state auditor (2019–present) (successfully ran for governor)

=== Results ===
Democratic primary results
Party	Candidate	Votes	%
Democratic	Taylor Wettach	176,319	99.8
Write-in		380	0.2
Total votes		176,699	100.0

== Republican primary ==
=== Candidates ===
==== Nominee ====
- Chris Cournoyer, lieutenant governor of Iowa (2024–present)

==== Eliminated in primary ====
- Abigail Maas, Iowa County supervisor (2020–present)

=== Endorsements ===
Chris Cournoyer

U.S. senators

- Joni Ernst, Iowa (2015–2027)

Statewide officials

- Kim Reynolds, governor of Iowa (2017–2027)
- Roby Smith, state treasurer of Iowa (2023–present)
Abigail Maas

State legislators

- Kevin Alons, SD-07 (2023–present)
- Brooke Boden, HD-21 (2023–present) and HD-26 (2021–2023)
- Samantha Fett, HD-22 (2025–present)
- Jesse Green, SD-24 (2021–present)
- Sandy Salmon, SD-29 (2023–present)

Individuals

- Steve Deace, conservative talk show host

=== Results ===
Primary results by county: Cournoyer: 50–60%; 60–70%; 70–80%; Maas: 50–60%; 60–70%; 70–80%

Republican primary results
Party	Candidate	Votes	%
Republican	Chris Cournoyer	99,946	54.0
Republican	Abigail Maas	84,633	45.7
Write-in		523	0.3
Total votes		185,102	100.0

== General election ==
=== Results ===
2026 Iowa State Auditor election results
Party	Candidate	Votes	%	±%
Democratic	Taylor Wettach	666,632	50.2	+0.11
Republican	Chris Cournoyer	660,159	49.7	−0.14
Independent	Write-in	1,328	0.1	+0.03
Total votes		1,328,119	100.0	
