= Chris Cournoyer =

American politician (born 1970)

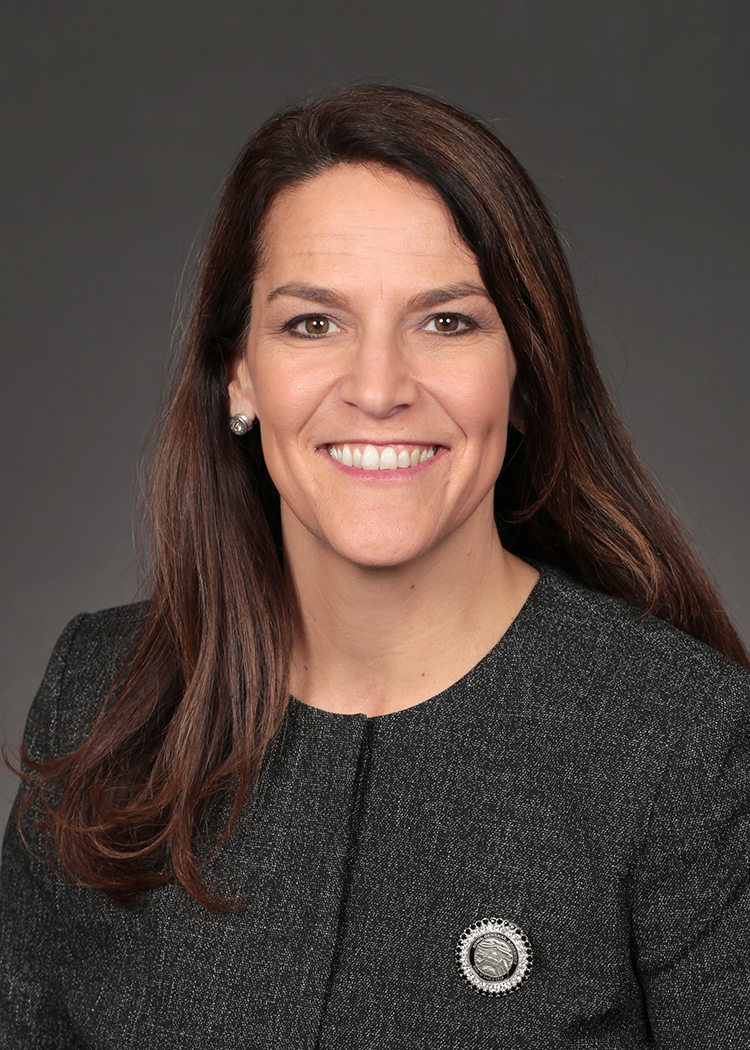
- Official portrait, 2019

48th Lieutenant Governor of Iowa
- Incumbent
- Assumed office December 16, 2024
- Governor: Kim Reynolds
- Preceded by: Amy Sinclair (acting)

Member of the Iowa Senate
- In office January 14, 2019 – December 16, 2024
- Preceded by: Rita Hart
- Succeeded by: Mike Zimmer
- Constituency: 49th district (2019–2023); 35th district (2023–2024)

Personal details
- Born: Christine Gearhart; July 24, 1970 (age 56) Dallas, Texas, U.S.
- Party: Republican
- Spouse: Kurt Cournoyer (m. 1997; div. 2021)
- Children: 4
- Education: University of Texas, Austin (BA)

Christine S. Cournoyer (/kərˈnɔɪər/ kər-NOIR; née Gearhart, July 24, 1970) is an American politician who has served as the 48th lieutenant governor of Iowa since December 2024, having replaced Adam Gregg, who resigned from the role in September 2024. A member of the Republican Party, Cournoyer previously served as an Iowa state senator from the 35th District from 2019 to 2024. Cournoyer was the unsuccessful nominee for Iowa State Auditor in the 2026 election, losing to Democrat Taylor Wettach.

== Early life and career ==
Cournoyer was born in 1970 in Dallas, Texas.

She received a BA degree in 1992 from University of Texas, Austin, in computer science. Cournoyer worked as a website designer at Andersen Consulting, before becoming self-employed.

She also previously served on the Pleasant Valley Community School District School Board from 2013 until 2019, with 2 years as board president. She was a reserve sheriff deputy for Scott County.

== Political career ==
=== Iowa State Senate ===
Cournoyer was elected to the Iowa Senate in 2018 and was re-elected in 2023.

During her tenure, she held key leadership positions, including chairing the Education Budget Committee, where she oversaw the allocation of funds for Iowa's educational institutions. Additionally, she served as vice chair of the State Government Committee, playing a crucial role in shaping state government policies and procedures. Cournoyer has also served on several committees, including the Education Committee as vice chair, the Natural Resources and Environment Committee, the State Government Committee, the Transportation Committee, the Economic Development Appropriations Subcommittee, the Early Childhood Iowa State Board, and the Research and Development School Advisory Council. She helped Governor Reynolds to reduce the executive-level cabinet agencies from 37 to 16.

She was, additionally, an Assistant Majority Leader.

=== Lieutenant Governor of Iowa (2025–present) ===
On December 16, 2024, Kim Reynolds announced her nomination of Cournoyer to be the next lieutenant governor of Iowa and was sworn in by Chief Justice Susan Christensen later that day.

=== 2026 Iowa State Auditor race ===
On April 28, 2025, Cournoyer filed paperwork to run for Iowa State Auditor in the 2026 election. Governor Reynolds endorsed her. Cournoyer defeated Abigail Maas in the Republican primary and advanced to the November general election where she lost to the Democratic nominee, Taylor Wettach.

== Personal life ==
She married Kurt Cournoyer in 1997 and divorced in 2021. They share four children, including a set of twins. She lives in LeClaire. There is a scholarship named in her honor at Pleasant Valley School District, where she was a board member, named Lieutenant Governor Christine Gearhart Cournoyer "Unlocking Potential" Scholarship.

== Electoral history ==
=== Iowa Senate Races ===
Iowa Senate 49th District election, 2018
| Party | Candidate | Votes | % |
|---|---|---|---|
| Republican | Chris Cournoyer | 13,305 | 54.9% |
| Democratic | Patti Robinson | 10,916 | 44.5% |
| Republican gain from Democratic | | | |

Iowa Senate 35th District election, 2022
| Party | Candidate | Votes | % |
|---|---|---|---|
| Republican | Chris Cournoyer | 14,552 | 60.0% |
| Democratic | Jed O. V. Ganzer | 9,292 | 38.3% |
| Republican hold | | | |

=== Iowa Auditor Race ===
Primary results by county: Cournoyer: 50–60%; 60–70%; 70–80%; Maas: 50–60%; 60–70%; 70–80%

2026 Iowa State Auditor Republican Primary Election
| Party | Candidate | Votes | % |
|---|---|---|---|
| Republican | Chris Cournoyer | 100,013 | 54.00 |
| Republican | Abigail Maas | 84,686 | 45.72 |
| Write-in | | 523 | 0.28 |
| Total votes | | 185,102 | 100.00 |

2026 Iowa State Auditor General Election
| Party | Candidate | Votes | % |
|---|---|---|---|
| Republican | Chris Cournoyer | | |
| Democratic | Taylor Wettach | | |
| Write-in | | | |
| Total votes | | | 100.00 |

Political offices
| Preceded by Amy Sinclair; Acting | Lieutenant Governor of Iowa; 2024–present | Incumbent |
Party political offices
| Preceded by Todd Halbur | Republican nominee for Auditor of Iowa; 2026 | Most recent |
