= Richard D. Johnson =

American politician (1935–2022)

30th Iowa State Auditor
- In office January 26, 1979 – January 3, 2003
- Governor: Robert D. Ray; Terry Branstad; Tom Vilsack
- Preceded by: Lloyd R. Smith
- Succeeded by: David A. Vaudt

Mayor of Sheldahl
- In office 1964–1975

Personal details
- Born: Richard Dean Johnson; February 3, 1935 Spencer, Nebraska, U.S.
- Died: May 26, 2022 (aged 87) Ankeny, Iowa, U.S.
- Party: Republican
- Spouse: Marjorie Sire (m. 1956)
- Children: 4
- Education: Drake University (BS); United States Army Command and General Staff College

Military service
- Branch: Nebraska National Guard; Iowa National Guard
- Service years: 1955-1990
- Rank: Colonel

Richard Dean Johnson (February 3, 1935 – May 26, 2022) was the Iowa State Auditor from 1979 to 2003.

== Early life ==
Johnson was born the last of 6 children on February 3, 1935, in Spencer, Nebraska, to Henry and Clarice (née Kerbel) Johnson. He graduated from Spencer High School in 1952 and graduated from the General Motors Institute Dealer Co-op Program in 1954 in Flint, Michigan. He earned his bachelor's degree in accounting in 1960 from Drake University and became a CPA in 1963.

He began service in the Nebraska National Guard in 1955. In 1975, he graduated from United States Army Command and General Staff College. He transferred to the Iowa National Guard. He attained the rank of Colonel. He retired in 1990.

== Political career ==
=== City politics ===
He served as Sheldahl's City Clerk from 1959 to 1963 and as Sheldahl's mayor from 1964 to 1975.

=== Department of Transportation ===
In 1968, he joined the state auditor's office as the director of audits and then was appointed the director of finance for the Iowa Highway Commission. In 1975, he was appointed as the director of the Iowa Department of Transportation's (IDOT) Administration Division and then as director of IDOT's Motor Vehicle Division in 1978.

=== State auditor ===
Following Lloyd R. Smith's death in 1979, Governor Robert D. Ray appointed Johnson as Iowa State Auditor on January 26, 1979, until the 1980 Special Election.

==== 1980 special election ====
On November 4, 1980, there was a special election to replace Lloyd R. Smith, who had died on December 21, 1978.

Johnson ran as a Republican while the Democrat party ran no candidate and Thomas J. Oliver ran as a Socialist. Johnson won 647,299 votes, while Oliver lost with only 17,287 votes.

==== 1982 election ====
In 1982, Johnson ran against Democrat Tom Slockett and Socialist Anne R. Koloc. Johnson won 511,559 votes, while Slockett lost with 429,9381 votes and Koloc only received 3,838 votes. He won by 81,621 votes. He was re-elected to his first full term.

==== 1986 election ====
In 1986, Johnson ran against Democrat Beverly Dickerson. Johnson won 419,088 votes, against Dickerson's 406,747 votes, being re-elected to his second full term. He won by only 8,100 votes. He won by 12,341 votes.

==== 1990 election ====
In 1990, Johnson ran against Democrat Beverly Dickerson in a rematch of the 1986 election. Johnson won 448,898 votes, against Dickerson's 440,798 votes, being re-elected to his third full term. He won by a narrower margin of 8,100 votes, a loss of 4,241 votes from 1986.

==== 1994 election ====
In 1994, Johnson ran against Democrat Dan Gray. Johnson won 541,932 votes, against Gray's 367,722 votes, being re-elected to his fourth full term.

==== 1998 Election ====
In 1998, Johnson ran against Ronn Young of the Reform Party and William W. Graff of the Natural Law Party. Johnson won re-election with 588,079 votes, beating Young who received 56,635 votes and Graff who received 40,537 votes.

== Personal life and death ==
He married Marjorie Sire in 1956 and had three daughters and one son. They had eleven grandchildren and thirteen great-grandchildren at the time of his death. They attended Madrid Evangelical Free Church, where Johnson had served as treasurer, board member and trustee.

He died on May 26, 2022, in Ankeny, Iowa. He is buried at Sheldahl Cemetery in Sheldahl, Iowa.

Party political offices
Preceded by Lloyd R. Smith	Republican nominee for Iowa Auditor of State; 1980, 1982, 1986, 1990, 1994, 1998	Succeeded by David A. Vaudt
Political offices
Preceded by Lloyd R. Smith	Iowa State Auditor; 1979–2003	Succeeded by David A. Vaudt
