= Frank Shaw =

Frank Shaw may refer to:

- Frank H. Shaw (1882–1950), Pennsylvania civil engineer
- Frank L. Shaw (1887–1957), California politician and mayor of Los Angeles
- Frank S. Shaw (1859–1937), state auditor in Iowa
- Frank T. Shaw (1841–1923), congressman from Maryland
- Frank Shaw (writer), television and film writer, see Morning in the Streets
- Frank E. Shaw, American professor and tetragrammist
- Frank X. Shaw (1895–1962), American assistant film director
- Frank Shaw (producer), film producer, see Appointment for Love
- Frank Shaw (footballer) (1864–?), Scottish international footballer in the 1880s

== See also ==
- Frank Shawe-Taylor (1869–1920), Irish land agent and high sheriff of County Galway
- Francis Shaw (disambiguation)
- Frankie Shaw (born 1981 or 1982), American actress, writer and director
