= Byron A. Beeson House =

Historic house in Iowa, United States

- U.S. National Register of Historic Places
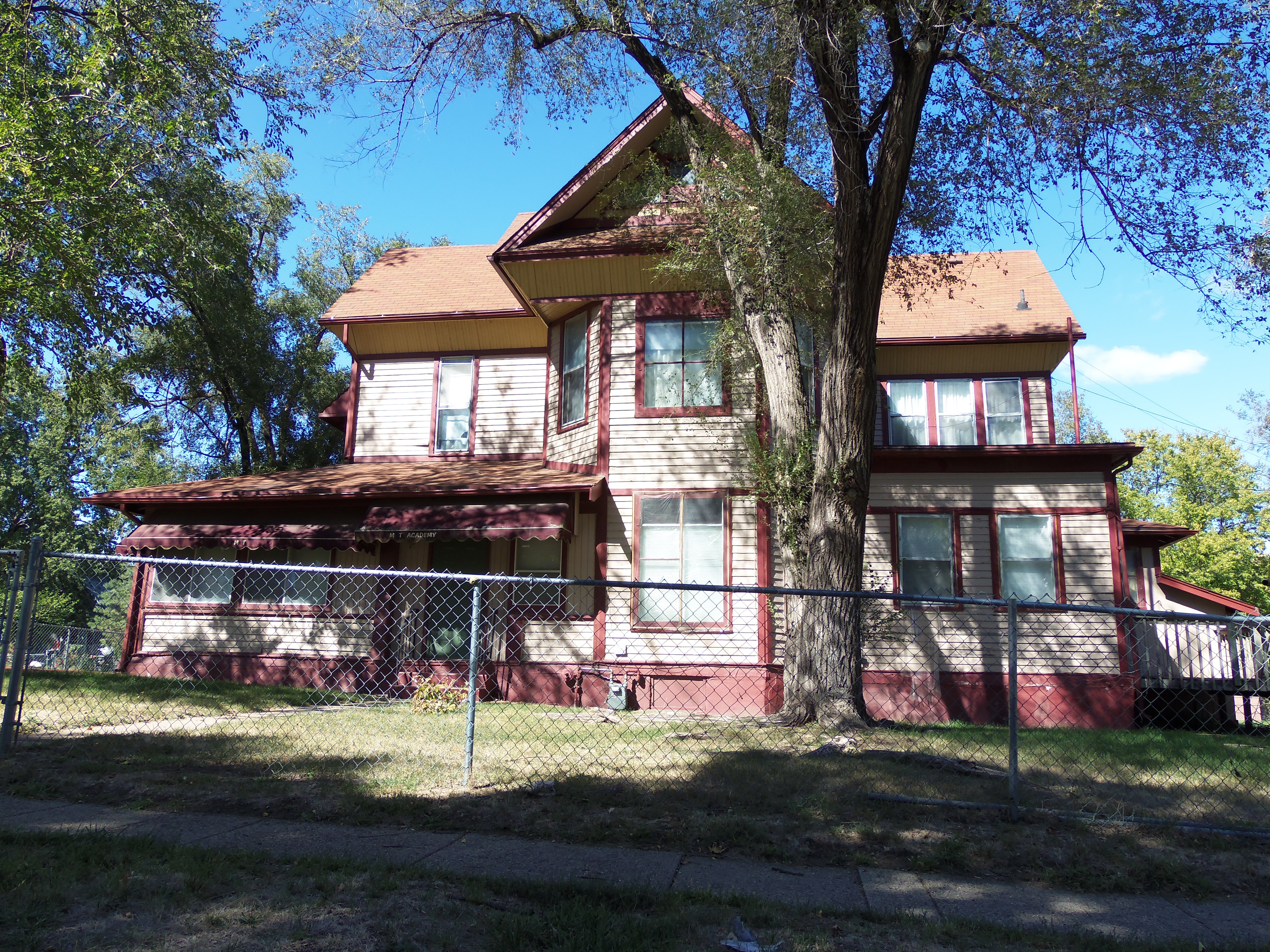

- Location within Iowa Location within the United States
- Location: 1503 5th Ave. Des Moines, Iowa
- Coordinates: 41°36′21.9″N 93°37′27.6″W
- Area: less than one acre
- Built: 1890
- Architectural style: Queen Anne
- MPS: Towards a Greater Des Moines MPS
- NRHP reference No.: 96001141
- Added to NRHP: October 25, 1996

The Byron A. Beeson House, also known as Mission Temple Academy, is a historic building located in Des Moines, Iowa, United States. Built c. 1890, the 2½-story structure features balloon frame construction, a complex roof system, and wrap-around front porch. Its flared cornice is considered unusual. It was originally a single-family dwelling that later became and education facility associated with the Church of God in Christ. It is also associated with Byron A. Beeson who served as Treasurer of Iowa from 1891 to 1895, and as Adjutant General of the Iowa National Guard around the same time. The house's significance is derived from its location in suburban North Des Moines and its complex roof system. It was listed on the National Register of Historic Places in 1996. A stable along the alley behind the house shares the historic designation.
