= James C. McClune =

American politician (1871-1940)

J. C. McClune

23rd Iowa State Auditor
- In office January 1, 1925 – January 1, 1927
- Governor: John Hammill
- Preceded by: James E. Thomas
- Succeeded by: James W. Long

Member of the Iowa House of Representatives
- In office January 10, 1921 – January 11, 1925
- Preceded by: Thomas J. Wilson
- Succeeded by: Charles Oldham

Personal details
- Born: James C. McClune; May 3, 1871 Rock Island County, Illinois
- Died: November 19, 1940 (aged 69) Oskaloosa, Iowa
- Party: Republican
- Spouse: Lenna Morgan (m. 1898)
- Children: 2
- Education: Western Normal College; Northern Indiana University

James C. McClune (May 3, 1871 – November 19, 1940 ) was the Iowa State Auditor from 1925 to 1927.

== Early life ==
He was born in Rock Island County, Illinois in 1871. He farmed for the first 18 years of his life in Iowa County, Iowa. He attended Western Normal College in Nebraska for six months before moving to Northern Indiana University (now Valparaiso University), where he studied law. In 1893, he was admitted to the Indiana and Iowa bars and began practicing law. He worked in What Cheer, Iowa, until 1897 when he became the city attorney.

== Political career ==
=== Iowa House ===
In 1920, he ran against Democrat W. H. Broerman for the Iowa House seat of District 25. McClune won 6,564 votes against Broerman's 3,531 votes.

In 1922, he ran for re-election against Democrat Dan K. Unsicker for District 25. McClune won 3,640 votes against Unsicker's 3,439 votes, winning by only 201 votes.

He served in the Iowa House of Representatives from 1921 to 1925.

=== State Auditor ===
In June 1924, McClune ran in a crowded Republican primary race against former Boone County Auditor G. H. Getty, former Decatur County Auditor J. V. Lemley, State Commander of the Disabled American Veterans William H. Nye, Iowa State Senator John Colborne Tuck and O. E. Wilson. McClune was nominated in July by the party to be the candidate.

He ran in the general against Democrat E. T. Likes. McClune won 564,237 votes against Likes' 216,767 votes. He was sworn in on January 2, 1925.

== Personal life ==
He married Lenna Morgan in Keokuk County, Iowa on September 8, 1898. They had 2 daughters.

He died on November 19, 1940, at the Oskaloosa Hospital in Oskaloosa, Iowa after his car hit some loose gravel and slid into a ditch. He sustained a fractured neck. Lenna died in Tucson, on April 18, 1960.

Preceded by James E. Thomas	Iowa State Auditor; 1925-1927	Succeeded by James W. Long
