= Frank S. Shaw =

American politician (1859–1937)

Frank Shaw

20th Iowa State Auditor
- In office January 1915 – January 1, 1921
- Governor: George W. Clarke; William L. Harding
- Preceded by: John L. Bleakly
- Succeeded by: Glenn C. Haynes

Tama County Auditor
- In office 1909–1912

Deputy Auditor of Tama County
- In office 1904–1909

Deputy Treasurer of Tama County
- In office 1896 – December 1900

Personal details
- Born: Frank S. Shaw; October 27, 1859 Stephenson County, Illinois
- Died: December 18, 1937 (aged 78) Iowa City, Iowa
- Party: Republican
- Spouse: Mabel L. Clarke (m. 1897)
- Children: 5
- Education: Leander Clark College

Frank S. Shaw (October 27, 1859 – December 18, 1937) served as Iowa State Auditor from 1915 to 1921.

== Early life ==
Shaw was born in 1859 in Stephenson County, Illinois. He attended Leander Clark College. From 1875 to 1878, he farmed in Grundy County. He worked for the Chicago & Northwestern Railroad from 1882 to 1884. Then he entered the jewelry business in 1884. In 1901, he returned to the jewelry business until 1904. In 1912, he engaged in real estate business until 1914.

== Government career ==
He was appointed as Deputy Treasurer of Tama County in 1896 until December 1900. In 1904, he became Deputy Auditor of Tama County. In November 1908, he was elected to be County Auditor for Tama County until 1912.

In June 1914, Shaw ran against Clark B. Ellis, John F. Ford, J. F. Wall and Joe H. Byrnes in the Republican primary for State Auditor. Shaw won 36,638 votes against Ford's 28,983 votes, Byrnes' 25,535 votes, Ellis' 19,690 votes and Wall's 17,133 votes. When the primary occurred, no one received more than 35% of the vote, leaving it for the state convention to decide who would be the nominee.

In November 1914, Shaw ran in the general election against Democrat George Phillips, Progressive Bruce Francis, Socialist G. S. Nelson and Prohibition candidate C. M. Kelley. Shaw won with 215,676 votes against Phillips' 157,353 votes, Francis' 14,649 votes, Nelson's 9,265 votes, Kelley's 6,137 votes. He was elected to his first term as Iowa State Auditor and was sworn in in January 1915.

In June 1916, Shaw ran unopposed in the Republican primary. In November 1916, Shaw ran against Democrat John B. Keefe, Progressive Jerome Smith, Socialist T. H. Angell and Prohibition candidate Morris Bailey. Shaw won 280,522 votes against Keefe's 171,022 votes, Angell's 9,124 votes, Bailey's 2,424 votes and Smith's 1,398 votes. He was elected to his second term.

In June 1918, Shaw ran unopposed in the Republican primary. In November 1918, Shaw ran in the general election against Democrat Guy M. Gillette, Prohibition candidate Carl S. Lewis, Socialist George M. McDowell. Shaw won 216,871 votes against Gillette's 127,307 votes, McDowell's 10,120 votes and Lewis' 1,337 votes. He was elected to his third term.

He left office in 1921.

== Personal life ==
He married Mabel L. Clarke on July 17, 1897, and had 5 children together.

Shaw died at the University of Iowa Hospital in Iowa City.

Preceded by John L. Bleakly	Iowa State Auditor; 1915-1921	Succeeded by Glenn C. Haynes
