= Taylor Wettach =

American politician

- Wettach in 2026

Auditor-elect of Iowa
- Assuming office January 12, 2027
- Governor: Rob Sand (elect)
- Succeeding: Rob Sand

Personal details
- Born: Muscatine, Iowa, U.S.
- Party: Democratic
- Education: Georgetown University (BS, MA); New York University (JD)

Taylor Wettach is an American attorney and politician. A member of the Democratic Party, he is the Auditor-elect of Iowa.

== Biography ==
Wettach is from Muscatine, Iowa. He attended Georgetown University and earned a Bachelor of Science and Master of Arts from their School of Foreign Service. He graduated from New York University School of Law and practiced at Simpson Thacher & Bartlett. He quit from the law firm after it was targeted by President Donald Trump and they agreed to provide pro bono legal services to the Trump administration.

In July 2025, Wettach announced that he would run for the Democratic Party nomination for the United States House of Representatives in Iowa's 1st congressional district in the 2026 election. He decided to switch his candidacy to run for Iowa State Auditor in January 2026. Wettach narrowly defeated Lieutenant Governor Chris Cournoyer to win election as state auditor.

Party political offices
Preceded by Rob Sand	Democratic nominee for Auditor of Iowa; 2026	Most recent
Political offices
Preceded by Rob Sand	Auditor of Iowa; Taking office 2027	Elect
