= Sam Clovis =

American politician (born 1949)

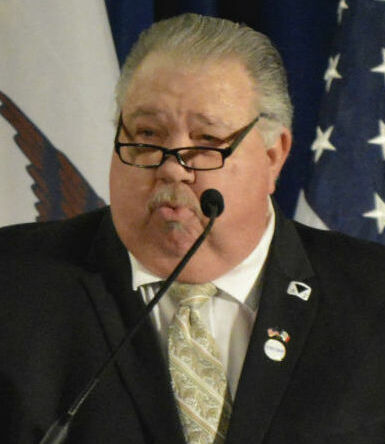

Personal details
- Born: Samuel Harvey Clovis Jr. September 18, 1949 (age 76) Salina, Kansas, U.S.
- Party: Republican
- Spouse: Charlotte Chase
- Children: 3
- Education: U.S. Air Force Academy (BA); Golden Gate University (MBA); University of Alabama (DPA)

Military service
- Allegiance: United States
- Branch/service: United States Air Force
- Years of service: 1971–1996
- Rank: Captain
- Unit: 70th Fighter Squadron

Samuel Harvey Clovis Jr. (born September 18, 1949) is a former United States Air Force officer, talk radio host, and political figure. Clovis is currently retired in Iowa.

Clovis unsuccessfully ran for Iowa state treasurer in the 2014 elections. He was national co-chair of Donald Trump's campaign in the 2016 presidential election. In January 2017, Trump appointed Clovis a senior White House adviser to the USDA. In July 2017, Trump nominated Clovis as Under Secretary of Agriculture for Research, Education, and Economics in the United States Department of Agriculture. On November 2, 2017, Clovis withdrew from consideration for the appointment following news of his involvement in the 2017 Special Counsel investigation. He resigned from the USDA effective May 4, 2018.

== Early life and education ==
Clovis was born in Salina, Kansas, and grew up in Medora, Kansas. As a high school senior, he was accepted to the U.S. Military Academy and the United States Air Force Academy in 1966. He graduated from Buhler High School in 1967 and went on to attend the Air Force Academy in Colorado Springs, where he earned a bachelor's degree in political science.

Clovis received an MBA from Golden Gate University in 1984, and attended the national security program at Georgetown University. He earned a doctorate in public administration (D.P.A.) from the University of Alabama in 2006. His dissertation concerned federalism and homeland security preparation.

== Career ==
Clovis served in the Air Force for 25 years (1971–96). He was a fighter pilot and flight instructor and served in The Pentagon, the Middle East, and as commander of the 70th Fighter Squadron. He rose to the rank of colonel and retired as the Inspector General of the North American Aerospace Defense Command and the United States Space Command.

After retiring from the Air Force, Clovis worked for BETAC (1996–97) and Northrop Grumman (1997–2000). In 2000, he moved to Iowa and worked at William Penn University in Oskaloosa, until 2003. In 2003 he worked for Booz Allen Hamilton for a year; from 2004 to 2010 he worked for the Homeland Security Institute, now the Homeland Security Studies and Analysis Institute. In 2005 he began working at Morningside College in Sioux City, Iowa, as a professor, teaching classes on business, management and public policy.

In January 2010, Clovis started hosting his own radio talk show Impact With Sam Clovis on Sioux City, Iowa station KSCJ. About the same time, he became active in the Republican Party and served as a delegate to the state convention in 2010. In 2012, he supported and campaigned with Rick Santorum, who won the Iowa caucuses in an upset. He was chairman of the 4th District Republican convention as well as an alternate delegate to the 2012 Republican National Convention.

In the fall of 2013, Clovis took a sabbatical from his professorship at Morningside College to pursue a political career. He was a candidate in the Republican primary for the United States Senate in Iowa, finishing second to state Senator Joni Ernst, with 19 percent of the vote, on June 3, 2014. Later in June, at the Iowa GOP state convention, Clovis was selected as the Republican nominee for the Iowa state Treasurer, running against Democratic incumbent Michael Fitzgerald. Clovis then hired Matthew Whitaker, also an unsuccessful Republican Senate primary candidate, to chair his campaign for state treasurer. In November, Clovis lost to Fitzgerald, 53% to 44%.

=== Trump advisor and administration official ===
On June 4, 2015, The Washington Post reported that former Texas Governor Rick Perry, shortly after launching his presidential campaign, hired Clovis to chair his campaign in Iowa. On August 24, 2015, nearly three months later, The Washington Post reported that Clovis resigned from the campaign, in part, over the campaign's failure to pay his salary. Clovis endorsed Donald Trump the next day, August 25, with an introduction at a rally held in Dubuque, Iowa. Clovis joined the campaign as a national co-chair and policy advisor. During this time, Clovis went on unpaid leave from Morningside College, before leaving permanently in late 2015.

Clovis became national co-chairman of Trump's campaign team and served as a frequent spokesperson on cable news. After Trump took office in January 2017, he appointed Clovis as senior White House adviser to the United States Department of Agriculture (USDA).

In July 2017, Trump nominated Clovis to the post of Under Secretary of Agriculture for Research, Education, and Economics, the USDA's top science post. The nomination attracted attention because this post is traditionally filled by a scientist, and Clovis has no scientific background. A statute requires that nominees for the position be chosen from among "distinguished scientists with specialized training or significant experience in agricultural research, education, and economics."

In October 2017, former Trump campaign foreign policy advisor George Papadopoulos pleaded guilty to lying to federal agents about his contacts with the Russia government during the campaign. Papadopoulos was charged by special counsel Robert Mueller as part of his investigation into Russian interference in the 2016 U.S. election. According to court records, Papadopoulos had been recruited to join Trump's foreign policy advisor team in early March 2016 by a "campaign supervisor" later identified as Clovis. In a meeting on March 6, Clovis reportedly told Papadopoulos that "a principal foreign policy focus of the campaign was an improved U.S. relationship with Russia," but Clovis denies having said that. Over the next few months, Papadopoulos made repeated but unsuccessful attempts to arrange meetings or contacts between Russian officials and Trump or his campaign representatives. Clovis was identified as a campaign supervisor who encouraged Papadopoulos to travel to Russia and meet Russian officials to build relations with the Kremlin. It was reported that Clovis has spoken to investigators with the special prosecutor's office and has testified before the federal grand jury looking into the matter. He has since withdrawn from the nomination due to the ongoing investigation and questions about his role.

On November 2, 2017, Clovis withdrew from consideration for the appointment for Under Secretary of Agriculture after he was linked to the special counsel investigation. His nomination was not formally withdrawn by President Trump but was instead returned unconfirmed to the President by the U.S. Senate on January 3, 2018, under Standing Rules of the United States Senate, Rule XXXI, paragraph 6.

Effective May 4, 2018, Clovis resigned from the USDA. In June 2019, the Republican and Democratic leaders of the Senate Intelligence Committee made a criminal referral to federal prosecutors regarding their belief that Clovis mislead them in his official testimony.

== Views ==
=== Barack Obama ===
In August 2017, CNN reported on the existence of a now-defunct blog that Clovis had maintained primarily between 2011 and 2012. In blog posts accessed via the Wayback Machine, Clovis was critical of President Barack Obama and the progressive movement, accusing Obama of being a socialist and writing that progressives were "liars, race traders and race 'traitors.'" A USDA spokesperson responded that Clovis "is a proud conservative and a proud American. All of his reporting either on the air or in writing over the course of his career has been based on solid research and data. He is after all an academic." In 2011, Clovis said that Obama "uses his self-identified race as a bludgeon to assault anyone who might disagree with him... The fact that he is a socialist, does not believe in Natural Law or Natural Rights, is incensed at the mere existence of the Constitution and cannot accept the exceptionality of this nation, probably has nothing to do with why so many people disagree with him and his value system."

=== Education ===
In 2011, Clovis said that schools were indoctrinating students with concepts that go against the ideals of the founding of the United States, such as "environmentalism", "racism", "feminism" and "pacifism". He said that these are "isms" that "tend to warp and twist the logic and intellectual development of children."

=== LGBT rights ===
In 2012, Clovis has said that homosexuality is a choice and that the sanctioning of same-sex marriage could lead to the legalization of pedophilia.

=== Climate change ===
In 2014, Clovis described climate research as "junk science", and said that the scientific consensus on climate change was "not proven". In 2014, he told Iowa Public Radio that he is skeptical about climate change.

== Personal life ==
Clovis lives in Hinton, Iowa, together with his wife Charlotte. He has two grown sons from a first marriage and one stepson, Khan. He is Roman Catholic.

== Awards ==
- Defense Superior Service Medal with Oak Leaf Cluster

== See also ==
- Mueller Report
- Timeline of Russian interference in the 2016 United States elections
- Timeline of Russian interference in the 2016 United States elections (July 2016–election day)
- Timeline of investigations into Trump and Russia (July–December 2017)

Party political offices
| Preceded by David Jamison | Republican nominee for Treasurer of Iowa; 2014 | Succeeded by Jeremy Davis |
