= Francis Shaw =

Francis Shaw may refer to:

- Francis Shaw (historian), see Pádraig Ó Snodaigh
- Francis Shaw (footballer), Scottish footballer
- Francis Shaw (composer), see MovieScore Media

== See also ==
- Frankie Shaw, American actress
- Frank Shaw (disambiguation)
- Frances Shaw (disambiguation)
