= Glenn C. Haynes =

American politician (1876-1942)

Glenn Haynes

Warden of Iowa State Penitentiary
- In office September 1, 1933 – June 6, 1942
- Preceded by: Thomas P. Hollowell
- Succeeded by: Percy A. Lainson

21st Iowa State Auditor
- In office January 1, 1921 – August 31, 1924
- Governor: Nathan E. Kendall
- Preceded by: Frank Shaw
- Succeeded by: James E. Thomas

Personal details
- Born: Glenn Clinton Haynes; August 25, 1876 Centerville, Iowa
- Died: June 6, 1942 (aged 65) Fort Madison, Iowa
- Party: Republican
- Spouse: Mamie Lane (m. 1896)
- Children: 2

Military service
- Branch: Iowa National Guard
- Service years: 1898-1936
- Rank: Brigadier General
- Unit: 168th Infantry Regiment
- Battles/wars: Spanish-American War; World War I
- Awards: Croix De Guerre; Distinguished Service Cross

Glenn Clinton Haynes (August 25, 1876 – June 6, 1942) was a United States Army officer and public official, who served as Iowa State Auditor from 1921 to 1924.

== Early life ==
Haynes was born on August 25, 1876, in Centerville, as one of nine children to Eugene C. Haynes and Elma (Felkner) Haynes in 1876.

== Military career ==
Haynes served in the Spanish-American War as a sergeant in Company E of the 50th Iowa Volunteer Regiment, but not seeing any active battle. Later, during World War I, he was a captain in Company D of the 168th Infantry Regiment. He subsequently became a major in the 2nd Battalion, 168th Infantry Regiment.

He was awarded the Croix De Guerre and Distinguished Service Cross for his bravery while under fire in France.

After successive promotions, towards the end of his career with the Iowa National Guard, he was promoted to Brigadier General. He retired shortly after in 1936.

== Government career ==
Then he worked in the post office as an Assistant Postmaster and Postal Inspector.

He served as Iowa Auditor of State from 1921 to 1924. On August 28, 1924, he announced that he would be resigning on August 31, 1924, with four months left to his term, in order to join the Iowa Good Roads Association as Executive Secretary. His Deputy Auditor, J. E. Thomas, succeeded him on September 1. Haynes served in this role until 1932, and was credited with pulling Iowa "out of the mud" and paving Iowa's highways. Soon after starting this post he toured Illinois, Minnesota and Wisconsin to see how to implement his program of road improvement in Iowa.

In January 1924, Haynes joined the crowded Republican primary for governor. Other candidates were Iowa House Speaker Joe H. Anderson, Lt. Governor John Hammill, A. J. Banks, W. J. Burbank and Jonas D. Buser. Hammill won with 95,318 votes against Burbank's 88,804 votes, Anderson's 74,828 votes, Haynes' 65,088 votes, Buser's 15,459 votes and Banks' 11,097 votes.

In April 1932, Haynes joined the Republican primary for US Senate. Other candidates were incumbent Senator Smith W. Brookhart, Louis Cook, former Iowa Attorney General and Iowa State Senator George Cosson, L. E. Eickelberg and Henry Ames Field. Field won the primary with 197,263 votes compared to Brookhart's 145,902 votes, Haynes' 43,050 votes, Cosson's 29,687 votes, Cook's 12,103 votes and Eickelberg's 8,513 votes.

In September 1933, Haynes became the Warden of the Iowa State Prison at Fort Madison, following the prolonged illness of the previous incumbent, Thomas P. Hollowell. While in this position, he made several improvements within the prison, such as implementing athletic programs for the inmates. He served until his death in 1942.

== Personal life ==
He married Mamie Lane in 1896, and together they had a son and a daughter.

Haynes died on June 6, 1942, in Fort Madison of heart disease after several heart attacks in the preceding year.

Preceded by Frank Shaw	Iowa State Auditor; 1921-1924	Succeeded by James E. Thomas
