= Frances Shaw =

Frances Shaw may refer to:

- Frances Shaw (field hockey), see 2009 Women's Hockey Junior World Cup
- Frances Shaw, a character played by Jacqueline Bisset in Ally McBeal (1997–2002)

== See also ==
- Frankie Shaw, Rachel Frances Shaw, American actress, writer and director
- Dinah Shore, Frances Shore, American singer, actress, television personality
- Francis Shaw (disambiguation)
