= Lloyd R. Smith =

American politician (1911–1978)

29th Iowa State Auditor
- In office January 1, 1967 – December 21, 1978
- Governor: Harold Hughes; Robert D. Fulton; Robert D. Ray
- Preceded by: Lorne R. Worthington
- Succeeded by: Richard D. Johnson

Personal details
- Born: Lloyd Richard Smith; November 3, 1911 Forest City, Iowa
- Died: December 21, 1978 (aged 67) Fairfield, Iowa
- Party: Republican
- Spouse: Elaine Solyst (m. 1956)
- Children: 4

Military service
- Branch: US Navy
- Battles/wars: World War II

Lloyd Richard Smith (November 3, 1911 – December 21, 1978) was the Iowa State Auditor from 1967 to 1978.

== Early life ==
Smith was born in 1911 in Forest City, Iowa to Andrew J. Smith and Mary A. Smith. He graduated from Forest City High School and then received an associate's degrees from Waldorf College, then attended Chillicothe Business College in Chillicothe, Missouri, then attended Drake University and finally Grand View College.

During World War II, he served in the US Navy.

== Political career ==
For 16 years he served in the Iowa State Treasurer's office as Superintendent of the Gas Tax Refund Division.

=== State Auditor ===
He served 9 years in the Auditor's office as an auditor before being elected as Iowa State Auditor in 1966. He served from 1967 until his death in 1978. He had won the November 1978 election to serve another term as Auditor, just a month prior to his death.

In 1966, he ran against Republicans Rex McMahill, C. W. Ward, and Democrat Lorne R. Worthington. Ward had been fired by Worthington on the same day he announced his ambition to run for the office. Smith won the election with 442,063 votes against Worthington's 398,577 votes. He was elected to his first term and inaugurated on January 2, 1967.

In 1968, he ran against Democrat Donald J. Kelly and Prohibition candidate H. J. Buchholz. Smith won 618,400 votes against Kelly's 458,542 votes and Buchholz's 1,376 votes.

In 1970, he ran against Democrat Donald Linduski. Smith won 422,622 votes against Linduski's 323,510 votes.

In 1972, he ran against Democrat F. Harold Forret. Smith won votes 668,158 against Forret's 462,582 votes.

In 1974, he ran against Democrat F. Harold Forret in a rematch of 1972. Smith won votes 470,751 against Forret's 384,439 votes.

In 1978, he ran against Democrat John B. Brunow and Socialist Thomas J. Oliver. Smith won votes 446,604 votes against Brunow's 320,884 votes and Oliver's 2,920 votes. He died just over 6 weeks after his election win.

== Personal life ==
He married Elaine S. Solyst and together had 5 children. They were Baptists. He suffered a heart attack on December 21, 1978, at the home of a friend in Fairfield and died at the age of 67.

Preceded by Lorne R. Worthington	Iowa State Auditor; 1967-1978	Succeeded by Richard D. Johnson
