= Camp Dodge =

Military installation in the city of Johnston, Iowa

Coordinates: 41°42′11″N 93°43′07″W

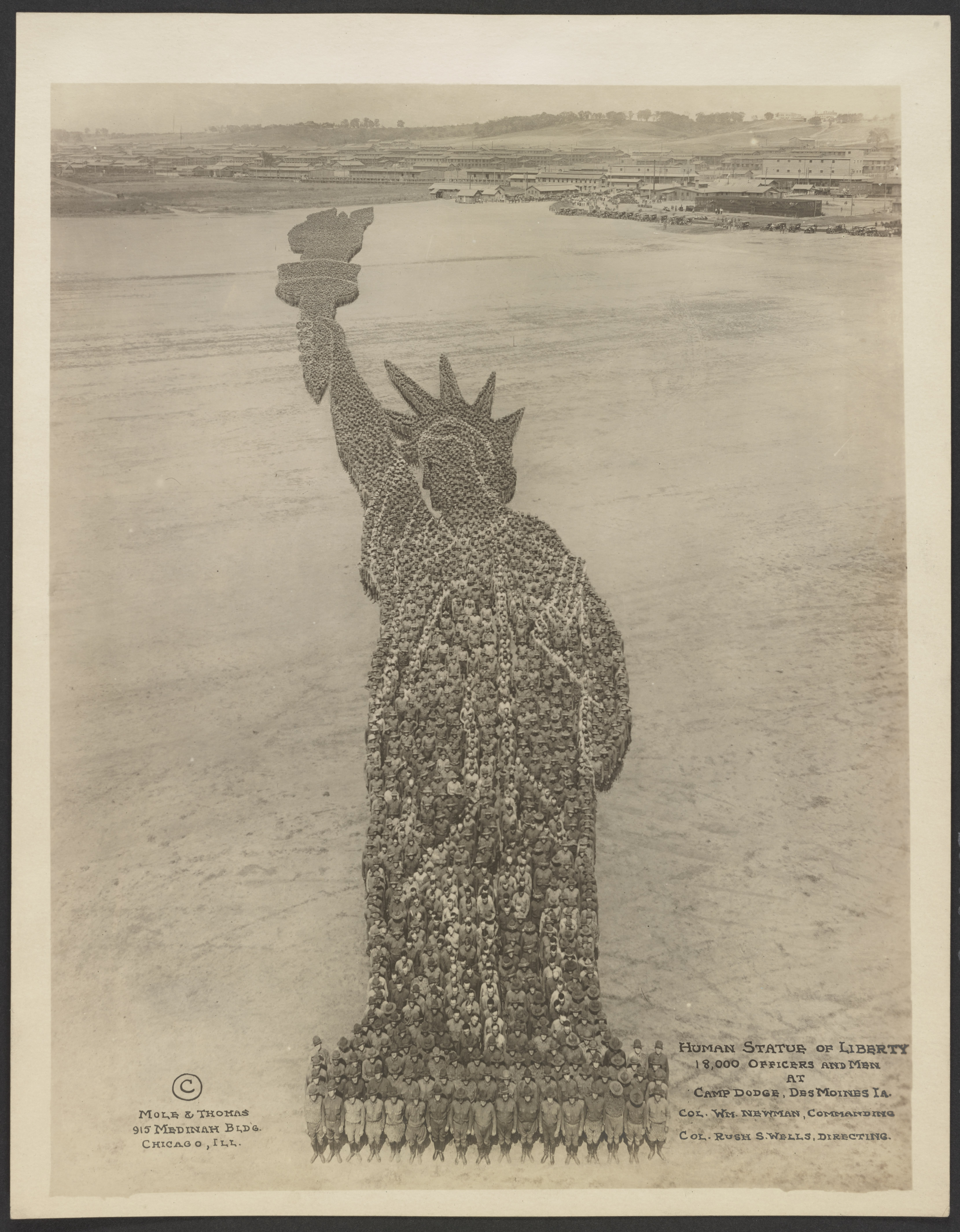
Human Statue of Liberty, created by Mole and Thomas using 18,000 officers and enlisted men at Camp Dodge near Des Moines, Iowa, 1918, during World War I

Camp Dodge is a military installation in the city of Johnston, Iowa. Centrally located near the capital of Iowa, it currently serves as the headquarters of the Iowa National Guard.

== History ==
Original construction of the post began in 1907, to provide a place for the National Guard units to train. In 1917, the installation was handed over to national authorities and greatly expanded to become a regional training center for forces to participate in the First World War.

The name Camp Dodge comes from Brigadier General Grenville M. Dodge, who organized Iowa's first National Guard unit in 1856. Although not a native-born Iowan, he became a well-known figure and resided within the state for most of his adult life. He is considered a War hero for his service and also served a term as a U.S. Congressman representing the state.

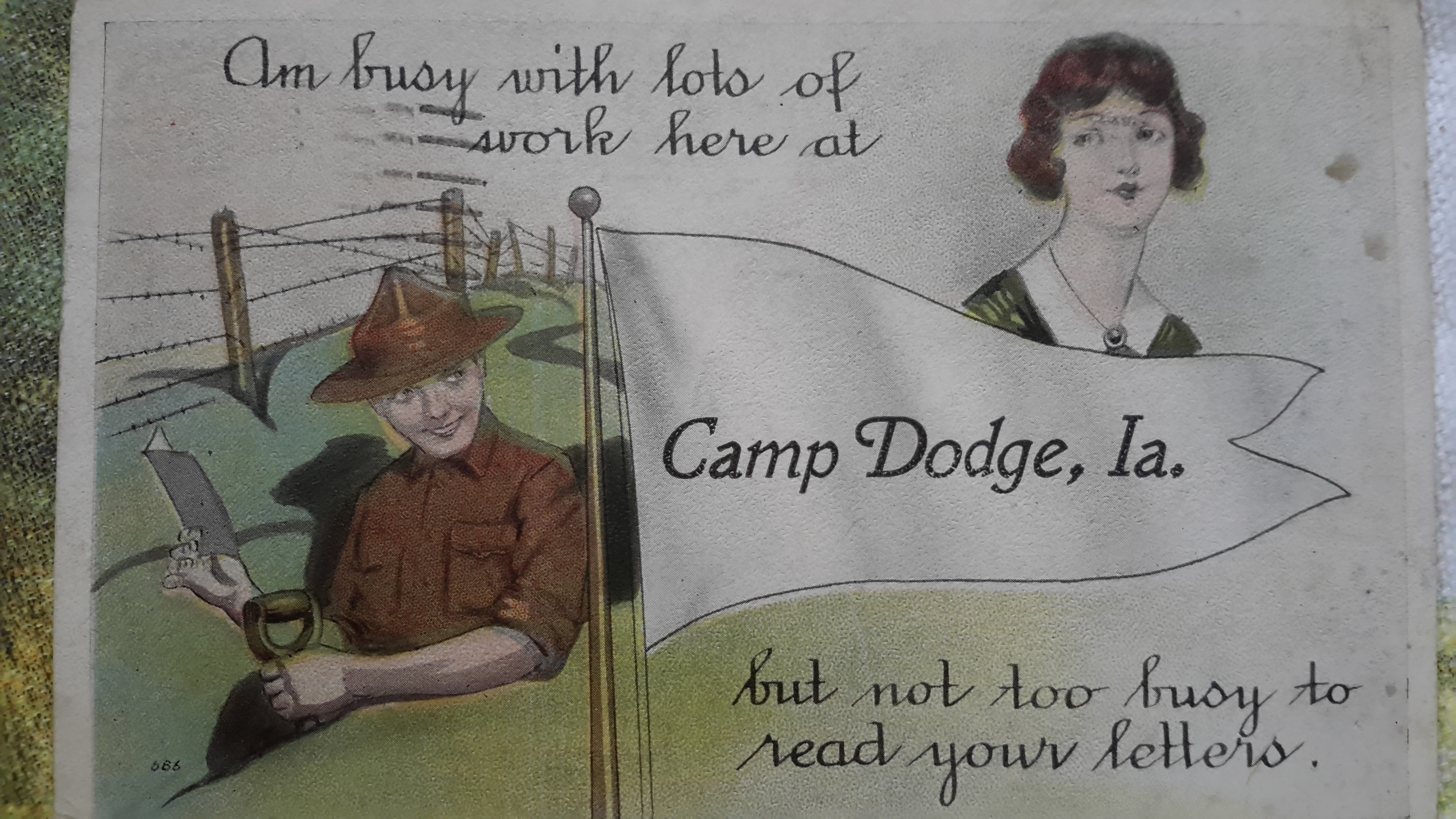
A post card sent by an American enlisted man from Camp Dodge, IA around 1918

In June 1917, the 163rd Depot Brigade was formed at Camp Dodge. The brigade was the base unit for the 88th Division, which processed new draftees and provided basic training. Later it appears the brigade despatched soldiers to multiple divisions, as two African American soldiers were sent to the 163rd Depot Brigade at Camp Dodge, before being posted to a front-line Pioneer Infantry Battalion in 92nd Division, the "Buffalo Soldiers Division". The 163 BDE was still at Dodge in April 1918.

Upon the end of the war, the post was downsized and turned back over to state authorities. Similarly, with the outbreak of the Second World War, Camp Dodge was again handed over to the federal government; however, this time the post was used only as an induction center for new service members. Camp Dodge has served as a Guard and Reserve installation since the end of the Second World War.

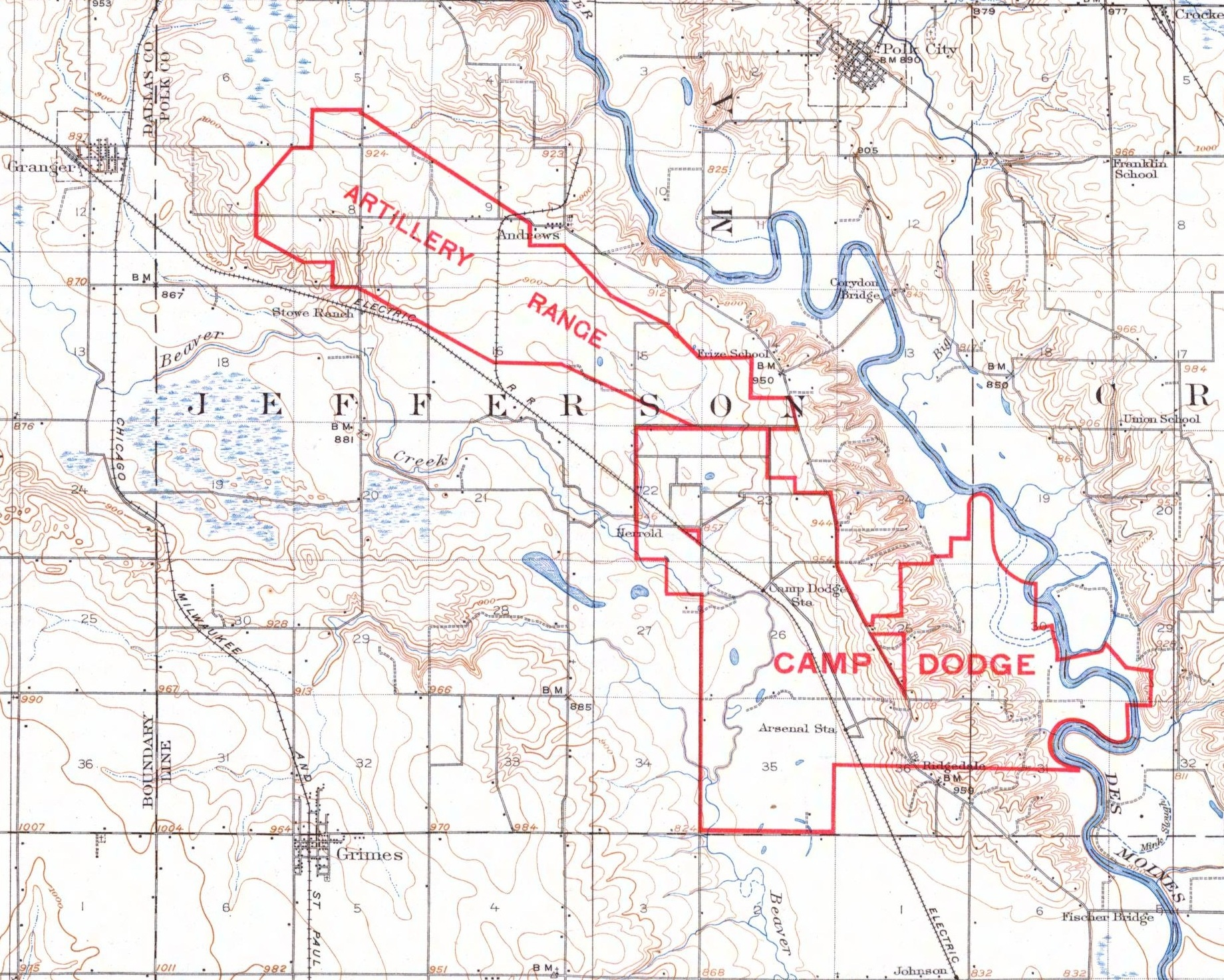
1918 topographic map of artillery range and Camp Dodge, Iowa

During World War II the Camp Dodge was defined as being at the town of Herrold, so many documents reference this name as its post office address. Herrold was surrounded by the camp. The U.S. Army Corps of Engineers purchased the town in 1990 to use as a training range. The nearby city of Johnston eventually became the new camp address.

Along with the numerous National Guard units located at Camp Dodge, the post is also home to the Sustainment Training Center (formerly the National Maintenance Training Center), Mission Training Complex-Dodge (MTC-Dodge), Joint Forces Headquarters, Iowa's emergency operations center, the operations center for the ICN, a MEPS installation, Iowa Law Enforcement Academy, and the State Police academy. The camp is the home of the Iowa Gold Star Military Museum, a member of the Army Museum System.
