= C. Fred Porter =

American politician (1883–1971)

Auditor of the Iowa Highway Commission
- In office July 1, 1947 – October 31, 1949

Comptroller of Iowa
- In office January 14, 1939 – July 1, 1947

Assistant Comptroller of Iowa
- In office 1933–1938

25th Iowa State Auditor Acting
- In office April 21, 1932 – January 1, 1933
- Governor: Dan W. Turner
- Preceded by: J. W. Long
- Succeeded by: Charles W. Storms

Deputy Iowa State Auditor
- In office 1927 – April 21, 1932
- Governor: John Hammill; Dan W. Turner
- Preceded by: Katherine Southworth
- Succeeded by: Cloyd J. Burns

Personal details
- Born: Charles Frederick Porter; July 20, 1883 near Truro, Iowa, US
- Died: July 20, 1971 (aged 88) Fayetteville, Arkansas, US
- Party: Republican
- Spouse(s): Susan Mary Hoover (m. 1903; died 1943) Wilhelmine Lee Weaver (m. 1949)
- Children: 3

Charles Frederick Porter (January 2, 1883 – July 20, 1971) was the Acting Iowa State Auditor from 1932 to 1933.

== Early life ==
Porter was born near Truro, Iowa to Ezekiel Porter and Elizabeth (Reither) Porter in 1883.

Porter began working in the meat industry until 1913, when he joined the automobile industry. He continued with this industry until he joined the State Auditor's office.

== Political career ==
=== Auditor's Office ===
Porter began service in the Auditor's office as a clerk and messenger in 1916 until 1926. He was also a statistician in the auditor's office. In 1926, he became the Deputy Auditor of State, until 1932.

In April 1932, Governor Dan W. Turner appointed Porter as Acting State Auditor when the previous auditor, James W. Long, was suspended for irregularities personal spending accounts that were charged to the state. He was chosen because he was not going to be running in the 1932 Auditor Election. At the end of his term, the Republican hold on this office for 78, since 1855, ended until 1939, when C. B. Akers, a Republican, won again.

=== Comptroller's Office ===
He then served as Assistant Comptroller from 1933 to 1938. In 1939, he was appointed to be State Comptroller by Governor George A. Wilson. On July 1, 1947, Governor Robert D. Blue appointed Ray E. Johnson to replace Porter as Comptroller.

=== Iowa Highway Commission ===
Porter then served as the Auditor of the Iowa Highway Commission on July 1, 1947. He resigned so he could move out of state due to poor health on October 31, 1949.

== Personal life ==
He married Susan Mary Hoover on December 23, 1903 and had three children. Susan died in April 1943 of a prolonged illness, that lasted 15 months.

He married his former secretary, Wilhelmine Lee Weaver, on October 12, 1949, in Des Moines.

Porter was a Methodist.

Porter died in Fayetteville, Arkansas in 1971.

Preceded by J. W. Long	Iowa State Auditor; 1932-1933	Succeeded by Charles W. Storms
