= 2014 Iowa elections =

A general election was held in the U.S. state of Iowa on November 4, 2014. All of Iowa's executive officers were up for election as well as a United States Senate seat, all four of Iowa's seats in the United States House of Representatives, 25 (half) of the seats in the Iowa Senate, and all 100 seats in the Iowa House of Representatives. Primary elections were held on June 3, 2014.

== Governor and lieutenant governor ==
Incumbent Republican Governor Terry Branstad ran for re-election to a second consecutive and sixth overall term as governor.

He was challenged in the Republican primary by Tom Hoefling, a political activist and the America's Party and American Independent Party nominee for President in 2012.

State Senator Jack Hatch ran for the Democrats.

In Iowa, nominees for lieutenant governor are chosen at party conventions. They then run on a ticket with the gubernatorial nominee. Incumbent Republican Lieutenant Governor Kim Reynolds is running for re-election to a second term in office.

Iowa gubernatorial election, 2014
Party	Candidate	Votes	%
Republican	Terry Branstad/Kim Reynolds (incumbents)	666,023	59.0
Democratic	Jack Hatch/Monica Vernon	420,778	37.3
Libertarian	Lee Deakins Hieb/Tim Watson	20,319	1.8
New Independent	Jim Hennager/Mary Krieg	10,582	0.9
Iowa	Jonathan R. Narcisse/Michael Richards	10,239	0.9
n/a	Write-ins	1,093	0.1
Total votes		1,129,034	100.0
Republican hold			

== Attorney General ==
Incumbent Democratic Attorney General Tom Miller, who has served in the position since 1995, and previously from 1979 to 1991, ran for re-election to a sixth consecutive and ninth overall term in office.

Attorney and lobbyist, and future Lieutenant Governor of Iowa, Adam Gregg ran for the Republican Party.

Poll source	Date(s) administered	Sample size	Margin of error	Tom Miller (D)	Adam Gregg (R)	Other	Undecided
Public Policy Polling	November 1–3, 2014	1,265	± 2.8%	55%	36%	—	10%
Iowa Poll	October 28–31, 2014	701	± 3.7%	50%	39%	2%	9%
Suffolk University	October 11–14, 2014	500	± 4.4%	55%	31%	—	14%
Public Policy Polling	September 25–28, 2014	1,192	± 2.8%	53%	33%	—	14%
Suffolk	August 23–26, 2014	500	± 4%	48%	28%	—	24%
Public Policy Polling	August 22–24, 2014	915	± 3.2%	55%	31%	—	14%

Iowa Attorney General election, 2014
Party	Candidate	Votes	%
Democratic	Tom Miller (incumbent)	616,711	56.1
Republican	Adam Gregg	481,046	43.8
n/a	Write-ins	1,249	0.1
Total votes		1,099,006	100.0
Democratic hold			

== Secretary of State ==
2014 Iowa Secretary of State election
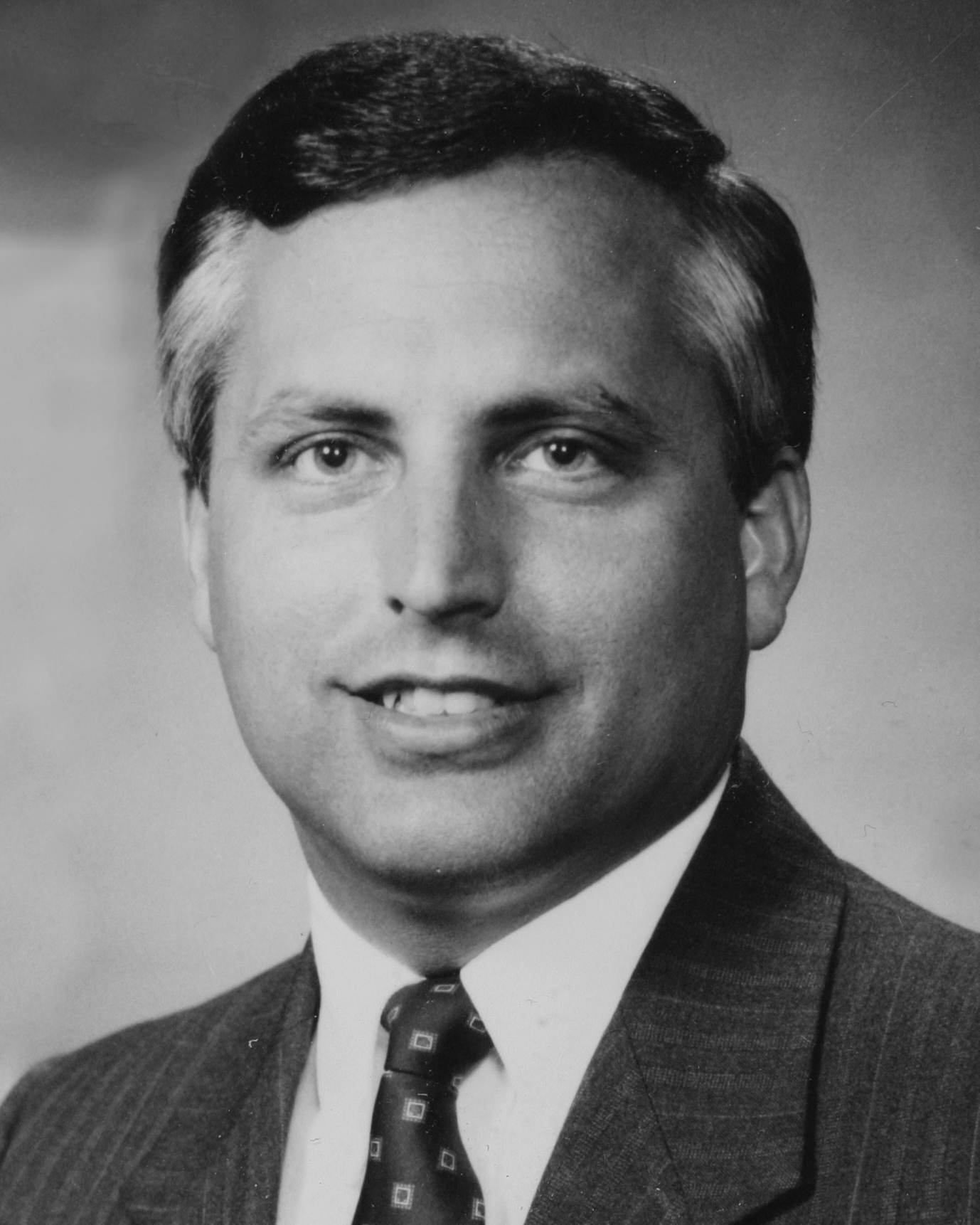

Candidate	Paul Pate	Brad Anderson
Party	Republican	Democratic
Popular vote	529,275	509,202
Percentage	48.5%	46.6%
- Pate: 40–50% 50–60% 60–70% 70–80% 80–90% Anderson: 40–50% 50–60% 60–70%
Secretary of State before election
Matt Schultz
Republican
Elected Secretary of State
Paul Pate
Republican

Incumbent Republican Secretary of State Matt Schultz, who had served in the position since 2011, did not run for re-election to a second term in office. He instead ran unsuccessfully for the Republican nomination for Iowa's 3rd congressional district.

Former Republican secretary of state Paul Pate defeated Democratic political consultant and former gubernatorial aide Brad Anderson in the general election.

Poll source	Date(s) administered	Sample size	Margin of error	Paul Pate (R)	Brad Anderson (D)	Other	Undecided
Public Policy Polling	November 1–3, 2014	1,265	± 2.8%	38%	44%	6%	13%
Iowa Poll	October 28–31, 2014	701	± 3.7%	44%	41%	3%	12%
Loras College	October 21–24, 2014	1,121	± 2.93%	39%	40%	1%	20%
Gravis Marketing	October 20–21, 2014	964	± 3%	38%	42%	—	19%
Suffolk University	October 11–14, 2014	500	± 4.4%	33%	32%	4%	32%
Gravis Marketing	September 29–30, 2014	522	± 4%	40%	40%	—	21%
Public Policy Polling	September 25–28, 2014	1,192	± 2.8%	36%	33%	6%	25%
Suffolk	August 23–26, 2014	500	± 4%	31%	31%	4%	33%
Public Policy Polling	August 22–24, 2014	915	± 3.2%	35%	34%	7%	24%
Gravis Marketing	July 17–18, 2014	1,179	± 3%	38%	38%	—	24%
Public Policy Polling	May 15–19, 2014	914	± 3.3%	32%	34%	—	34%

Iowa Secretary of State election, 2014
Party	Candidate	Votes	%
Republican	Paul Pate	529,275	48.5
Democratic	Brad Anderson	509,202	46.6
Libertarian	Jake Porter	32,889	1.8
New Independent	Spencer Highland	19,945	1.8
n/a	Write-ins	769	0.1
Total votes		1,092,080	100.0
Republican hold			

== Treasurer ==
2014 Iowa State Treasurer election
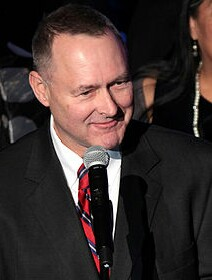

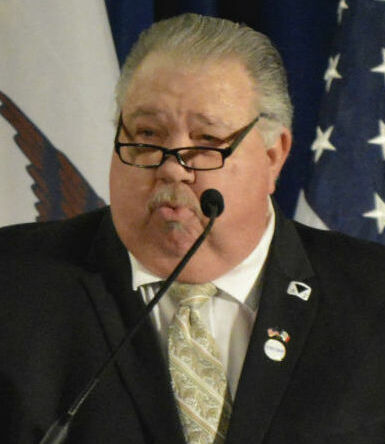
Candidate	Michael Fitzgerald	Sam Clovis
Party	Democratic	Republican
Popular vote	576,942	476,633
Percentage	52.9%	43.7%
- Fitzgerald: 40–50% 50–60% 60–70% Clovis: 40–50% 50–60% 60–70% 70–80% 80–90%
State Treasurer before election
Michael Fitzgerald
Democratic
Elected State Treasurer
Michael Fitzgerald
Democratic

Incumbent Democratic State Treasurer Michael Fitzgerald, who served in the position since 1983, ran for re-election to a ninth term in office.

The Republican nominee was Sam Clovis, a radio host who finished second in the Senate primary, before being nominated as the Republican candidate for treasurer.

Poll source	Date(s) administered	Sample size	Margin of error	Michael Fitzgerald (D)	Sam Clovis (R)	Other	Undecided
Public Policy Polling	November 1–3, 2014	1,265	± 2.8%	48%	38%	5%	8%
Loras College	October 21–24, 2014	1,121	± 2.93%	47%	35%	1%	17%
Gravis Marketing	October 20–21, 2014	964	± 3%	46%	33%	—	21%
Suffolk University	October 11–14, 2014	500	± 4.4%	47%	32%	3%	19%
Gravis Marketing	September 29–30, 2014	522	± 4%	48%	32%	—	20%
Public Policy Polling	September 25–28, 2014	1,192	± 2.8%	47%	35%	5%	13%
Suffolk	August 23–26, 2014	500	± 4%	41%	28%	2%	29%
Public Policy Polling	August 22–24, 2014	915	± 3.2%	47%	33%	5%	16%
Gravis Marketing	July 17–18, 2014	1,179	± 3%	50%	34%	—	17%

Iowa State Treasurer election, 2014
Party	Candidate	Votes	%
Democratic	Michael Fitzgerald (incumbent)	576,942	52.9
Republican	Sam Clovis	476,633	43.7
Libertarian	Keith Laube	36,945	3.4
n/a	Write-ins	670	0.1
Total votes		1,091,190	100.0
Democratic hold			

== Auditor ==
Incumbent Republican State Auditor Mary Mosiman, who was appointed to the position in 2013 after incumbent state auditor David A. Vaudt resigned, ran for election to a first full term in office.

Attorney and former Des Moines School Board member Jon Neiderbach ran for the Democrats.

2014 Iowa State Auditor election
Party	Candidate	Votes	%
Republican	Mary Mosiman (incumbent)	604,103	56.87
Democratic	Jonathan Neiderbach	456,525	42.98
Write-in		1,477	0.15
Invalid or blank votes		79,935	6.99
Total votes		1,142,040	100.0
Republican hold			

== Secretary of Agriculture ==
2014 Iowa Secretary of Agriculture election
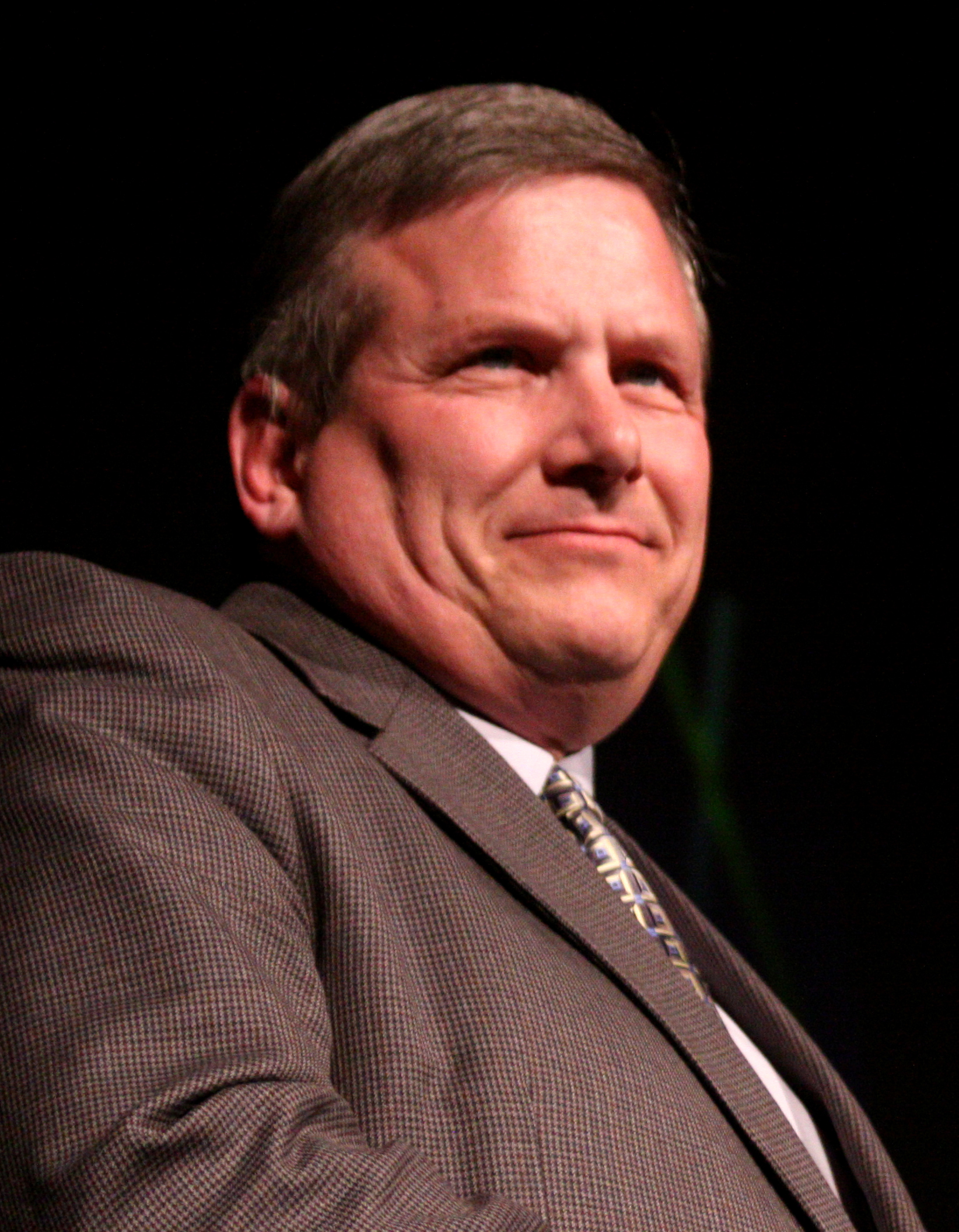

Candidate	Bill Northey	Sherrie Taha
Party	Republican	Democratic
Popular vote	675,781	370,209
Percentage	62.2%	34.1%
- Northley: 40–50% 50–60% 60–70% 70–80% 80–90% >90% Taha: 40–50% 50–60% 60–70% 70–80% 80–90% Tie: 40–50%
Secretary of Agriculture before election
Bill Northey
Republican
Elected Secretary of Agriculture
Bill Northey
Republican

Incumbent Republican Secretary of Agriculture Bill Northey, who had served in the position since 2007, ran for re-election to a third term in office.

Polk County Soil and Water Conservation District Commissioner Sherrie Taha ran for the Democrats.

Poll source	Date(s) administered	Sample size	Margin of error	Bill Northey (R)	Sherrie Taha (D)	Other	Undecided
Public Policy Polling	November 1–3, 2014	1,265	± 2.8%	51%	33%	5%	10%
Loras College	October 21–24, 2014	1,121	± 2.93%	49%	29%	2%	20%
Suffolk University	October 11–14, 2014	500	± 4.4%	52%	30%	2%	16%
Public Policy Polling	September 25–28, 2014	1,192	± 2.8%	49%	29%	6%	15%
Suffolk	August 23–26, 2014	500	± 4%	41%	28%	2%	29%
Public Policy Polling	August 22–24, 2014	915	± 3.2%	46%	28%	6%	19%

Iowa Secretary of Agriculture election, 2014
Party	Candidate	Votes	%
Republican	Bill Northey (incumbent)	675,781	62.2
Democratic	Sherrie Taha	370,209	34.1
New Independent	Levi Benning	39,349	3.6
n/a	Write-ins	891	0.1
Total votes		1,086,230	100.0
Republican hold			

== United States Senate ==
Incumbent Democratic senator Tom Harkin is retired rather than run for re-election to a sixth term in office.

U.S. Representative Bruce Braley was the only Democratic to file to run and thus the de facto nominee.

Five Republicans filed to run: radio host Sam Clovis, State Senator Joni Ernst, former CEO of Reliant Energy Mark Jacobs, businessman Scott Schaben and former U.S. Attorney for the Southern District of Iowa and nominee for Treasurer of Iowa in 2002 Matthew Whitaker.

United States Senate election in Iowa, 2014
Party	Candidate	Votes	%
Republican	Joni Ernst	588,575	52.1
Democratic	Bruce Braley	494,370	43.8
Independent	Rick Stewart	26,815	2.4
Libertarian	Douglas Butzier	8,232	0.7
Independent	Bob Quast	5,873	0.5
Independent	Ruth Smith	4,724	0.4
n/a	Write-Ins	1,111	0.1
Total votes		1,129,700	100.0
Republican gain from Democratic			

== United States House of Representatives ==
All of Iowa's four seats in the United States House of Representatives were up for election in 2014 and were contested.

== Iowa General Assembly ==
The 25 odd-numbered Iowa Senate seats were up for election in 2014, as were all 100 Iowa House seats. As of the primary filing deadline for the two major parties, there were 11 Senate seats and 58 House seats that only have candidates from one party, though several of these seats had contested primaries. These numbers are from the primary election candidate listing, so do not take into account candidates nominated by third parties, candidates nominated by petition, or candidates nominated by a major party after the primary. Such candidates file during the general election filing period, which runs from July 28 – August 15, 2014.
