= Lorne R. Worthington =

American politician (1938-1999)

Iowa Insurance Commissioner
- In office 1966–1971
- Governor: Harold Hughes; Robert D. Fulton; Robert D. Ray

28th Iowa State Auditor
- In office January 2, 1965 – January 1, 1967
- Governor: Harold Hughes
- Preceded by: C. B. Akers
- Succeeded by: Lloyd R. Smith

Member of the Iowa House of Representatives
- In office January 14, 1962 – January 10, 1965

Personal details
- Born: Lorne R. Worthington; June 14, 1938 Penticton, British Columbia, Canada
- Died: August 21, 1999 (aged 61) New York City, New York
- Party: Democratic
- Spouse: Veneta Snethen (m. 1959; div. 1982)
- Children: 7
- Education: University of Iowa; Graceland College (BA)

Lorne R. Worthington (June 14, 1938 – August 21, 1999) was the Iowa State Auditor from 1965 to 1967.

Until the election of Rob Sand in 2018, Worthington was the last Democrat to serve as Iowa State Auditor.

== Early life ==
Worthington was born to Paul and Alice Worthington, in 1938 in Penticton.

He graduated from Lewis and Clark High School in 1956. He attended the University of Iowa, majoring in accounting, and later Graceland College, where he received a bachelor's in business administration, with cum laude honors in May 1964.

== Career ==
Worthington was elected in 1962 to the Iowa House in district 6, covering Decatur County. He was one of the youngest Iowans to serve.

=== Auditor ===
In 1964, Worthington ran against incumbent C. B. Akers for Iowa State Auditor. Worthington won 609,932 votes against Akers' 493,396 votes. He was sworn in on January 2, 1965. He served from 1965 to 1967.

He ran for re-election in 1966, against Republican Rex McMahill, C. W. Ward, and Independent Lloyd R. Smith. Ward had been fired by Worthington on the day he announced his ambition to run for office. Smith won the election with 442,063 votes against Worthington's 398,577 votes.

=== Insurance commissioner ===
He was appointed as Insurance Commissioner by Governor Harold Hughes, serving in that position from 1966 to 1971.

== Personal life ==
He married Veneta Snethen on May 30, 1959, and they had 4 daughters and 3 sons. They divorced on February 16, 1982.

From 1973 to 1982, he served as president and CEO of Preferred Risk Mutual Insurance Company. He then became the executive vice president of New Hampshire Insurance, managing director of Seabury and Smith, and CEO of Vector Market and Research.

He was also an elder of the RLDS Church.

He died on August 21, 1999, of cancer, in New York City.

Preceded by C. B. Akers	Iowa State Auditor; 1965-1967	Succeeded by Lloyd R. Smith
Preceded by	Member of the Iowa House of Representatives; 1963-1965	Succeeded by
