= Charles W. Storms =

American politician (1870–1940)

26th Iowa State Auditor
- In office January 2, 1933 – January 3, 1939
- Governor: Clyde L. Herring; Nelson G. Kraschel
- Preceded by: C. Fred Porter
- Succeeded by: C. B. Akers

Personal details
- Born: October 12, 1870 Fort Madison, Iowa, US
- Died: February 12, 1940 (aged 69) Sioux City, Iowa, US
- Party: Democratic
- Spouse: Gertrude L. Reifenrath (m. 1900)
- Children: 5

Charles W. Storms (October 12, 1870 – February 12, 1940) was the Iowa State Auditor from 1933 to 1938.

== Early life ==
Storms was born in 1870 in Fort Madison. During World War I, he served on a War Board helping to distribute fuel. He owned a lumber business in Fort Madison.

== Political career ==
Storms served on the Fort Madison City Council for 12 years. He was also the Lee County Democratic Chairman for the Democratic State Committee for two years, during his 12 years of service on the committee.

In 1930, Storms ran against incumbent Republican J. W. Long. Long won 325,272 votes compared to Storms' 177,239 votes. Long was re-elected for his third term.

He served as Iowa State Auditor from 1933 to 1938.

In 1932, Storms ran against Republican Karl W. Fischer. Storms won 470,855 votes compared to Fischer's 434,969 votes. Storms won his first term.

In 1934, Storms ran against Republican Frank H. Hanson. Storms won 428,252 votes compared to Hanson's 369,559 votes. Storms won his second term.

In 1936, Storms ran against Republican Frank H. Hanson, a rematch from 1934, Farmer Labor candidate Herman O. Hansen and Prohibition candidate Francis Gordon. Storms won 533,300 votes compared to Hanson's 477,858 votes, Hansen's 16,300 votes and Gordon's 1,049 votes. Storms won his third term.

In 1938, Storms ran against Republican C. B. Akers, Farmer Labor candidate Carl Jorgensen, Progressive candidate Ernest Quick, and Prohibition candidate J. E. Lombard. Akers won 411,946 votes compared to Storm's 358,964 votes, Jorgensen's 5,427 votes, Quick's 1,756 votes and Lombard's 1,015 votes. Akers was sworn on January 3, 1939.

== Personal life ==
He was married Gertrude L. Reifenrath on June 7, 1900, and had five children. He died in 1940 from pneumonia after a tonsillectomy at Mercy Hospital in Sioux City, Iowa. Gertrude died on October 10, 1955, in Fort Madison, after a protracted year long illness.

Preceded by C. Fred Porter	Iowa State Auditor; 1932-1938	Succeeded by C. B. Akers
