= C. B. Akers =

American politician (1888–1978)

Chet B. Akers

27th Iowa State Auditor
- In office January 1, 1939 – January 2, 1965
- Governor: Harold Hughes
- Preceded by: Charles W. Storms
- Succeeded by: Lorne R. Worthington

Personal details
- Born: Charles Booth Akers; August 22, 1888 Frederic, Iowa
- Died: April 24, 1978 (aged 89)
- Party: Republican
- Spouse: Bessie M. Roten (m. 1922)

Military service
- Branch: US Army
- Battles/wars: World War I

Charles Booth Akers (August 22, 1888 – April 24, 1978) was the Iowa State Auditor from 1939 to 1965.

== Early life ==
Akers was born in 1888 to Charles A. Akers and Margaret T. (Falls) Akers in Frederic, Iowa. He graduated from Ottumwa Commercial College.

He served as an engineer in France during World War I.

== Political career ==
He served as Iowa State Auditor for 26 years from 1939 to 1965.

In 1938, Akers ran against incumbent Democrat Charles W. Storms, Farmer Labor candidate Carl Jorgensen, Progressive candidate Ernest Quick, and Prohibition candidate J. E. Lombard. Akers won 411,946 votes compared to Storms' 358,964 votes, Jorgensen's 5,427 votes, Quick's 1,756 votes and Lombard's 1,015 votes.

In 1940, Akers ran against Democrats J.J. Foarde and W. M. Shaw. Akers won with 225,281 votes compared to Shaw's 59,708 votes and Foarde's 37,404 votes. Akers was re-elected to his second term.

In 1942, Akers ran against Democrat W. M. Shaw, for the second time, Progressive candidate John P. Lynch and Prohibition candidate A. G. Peterson. Akers won with 400,046 votes compared to Shaw's 242,556 votes, Peterson's 1,718 votes and Lynch's 675 votes. Akers was re-elected to his third term.

In 1944, Akers ran against Democrat Peter J. Kies, Socialist candidate Annie M. Prescott and Prohibition candidate L. E. Gifford . Akers won with 538,388 votes compared to Kies' 495,916 votes, Gifford's 2,902 votes and Prescott's 988 votes. Akers was re-elected to his fourth term.

In 1946, Akers ran against Democrat W. A. Yager and Prohibition candidate R. T. Banks. Akers won with 361,888 votes compared to Yager's 218,315 votes and Banks' 2,979 votes. Akers was re-elected to his fifth term.

In 1948, Akers ran against Democrat Philip Keller and Prohibition candidate L. E. Gifford, again. Akers won with 484,509 votes compared to Keller's 439,934 votes and Gifford's 3,122 votes. Akers was re-elected to his sixth term.

In 1950, Akers ran against Democrat Neil B. Little and Prohibition candidate L. E. Gifford, for the third time, and Progressive Democrat John P. Lynch, for a second time. Akers won with 480,909 votes compared to Little's 310,967 votes, Gifford's 3,272 votes and Lynch's 711 votes. Akers was re-elected to his seventh term.

In 1952, Akers ran, for a four-year term for the first time, against Democrat J. Rex Weddle and Prohibition candidate L. E. Gifford, for the fourth time, and Republican Vigilant Party candidate John A. Coleman. Akers won with 720,584 votes compared to Weddle's 435,387 votes, Gifford's 2,114 votes and Coleman's 991 votes. Akers was re-elected to his seventh term.

In 1956, Akers ran against Democrat George J. Eischeid. Akers won with 629,148 votes compared to Eischeid's 515,954 votes. Akers was re-elected to his eighth term.

In 1960, Akers ran against Democrat Robert E. Hutte. Akers won with 638,727 votes compared to Hutte's 557,375 votes. Akers was re-elected to his ninth term and last term.

In 1964, Akers ran against Democrat Lorne R. Worthington and Communist Alvin E. Eliason. Worthington won 609,392 votes against Akers' 493,396 votes and Eliason's 2,192 votes. Worthington was sworn in on January 2, 1965.

== Personal life ==
He married Bessie M. Roten on September 16, 1922, and had one son. Akers died of lung cancer at the Des Moines Veterans Hospital on April 24, 1978. Bessie died in 1994, at age 103.

Preceded by Charles W. Storms	Iowa State Auditor; 1939-1965	Succeeded by Lorne R. Worthington
