= David A. Vaudt =

American politician (born 1953)

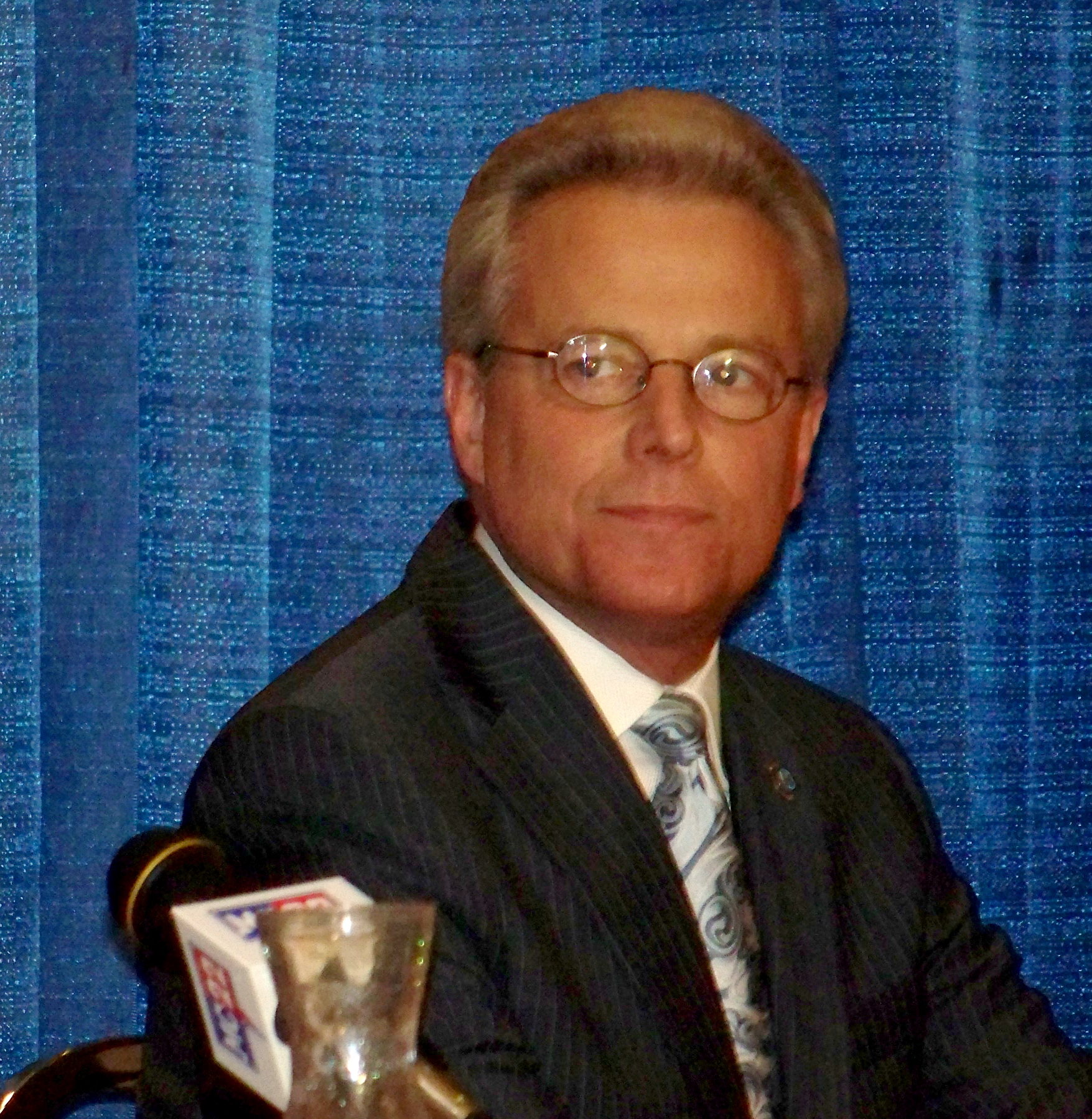
- Vaudt in 2007

31st Iowa State Auditor
- In office January 3, 2003 – May 3, 2013
- Governor: Tom Vilsack; Chet Culver; Terry Branstad
- Preceded by: Richard D. Johnson
- Succeeded by: Mary Mosiman

Personal details
- Born: David A. Vaudt; 1953 Livermore, Iowa, U.S.
- Party: Republican
- Spouse: Jeanie Kunkle

David A. Vaudt is an American Republican who was elected as the 31st Iowa Auditor of State from 2003 to 2013.

== Early life ==
Vaudt was born in Livermore in 1953. He graduated from the Upper Iowa University in 1976 with a Bachelor of Science in accounting, with Summa Cum Laude honors. He then became a CPA in 1977.

== Professional career ==
He joined Peal, Marwick, Mitchell & Co., a law firm, that later became KPMG in 1979, becoming a partner in 1988. He resigned in September 2001.

He served on the Iowa Accountancy Examining Board from 1994 to 2002 and the Board of Directors of the National Association of State Boards of Accountancy from 1995 to 2004.

In July 2013, he was named as Chairman of the Governmental Accounting Standards Board.

On December 20, 2024, Vaudt was named as member of the Federal Accounting Standards Advisory Board. His tenure on that board began on January 27, 2025, and will last for 5 years.

== State Auditor ==
=== Elections ===
In 2002, Vaudt ran for Iowa State Auditor against Democrat Patrick J. Deluhery and Libertarian Christy Ann Welty. Vaudt won 464,469 votes against Deluhery's 442,040 votes and Welty's 49,026 votes. Vaudt took office on January 3, 2003 and was sworn in by Iowa Chief Justice Louis A. Lavorato.

He ran again in 2006 unopposed, winning 669,434 votes.

He ran again in 2010 against Jon Murphy, winning 597,721 votes against Murphy's 460,493 votes.

=== Resignation ===
Vaudt announced his resignation as state Auditor in April 2013, with his last day being May 3, after being named the next chairman of the Governmental Accounting Standards Board (GASB), which he took office on July 1, 2013. Gov. Terry Branstad appointed Mary Mosiman, a former county auditor who was serving as the Deputy Secretary of State, as the new State Auditor. Mosiman took office on May 13, 2013.

== Personal life ==
He married Jeanie Kunkle. They live in West Des Moines.

== Electoral history ==
Election	Political result	Candidate	Party	Votes	%
2002 Iowa State Auditor Election; Turnout: 956,155	Republican hold	David A. Vaudt	Republican	464,469	48.58%
2002 Iowa State Auditor Election; Turnout: 956,155	Republican hold	Patrick J. Deluhery	Democratic	442,040	46.23%
2002 Iowa State Auditor Election; Turnout: 956,155	Republican hold	Christy Ann Welty	Libertarian	49,206	5.15%
2002 Iowa State Auditor Election; Turnout: 956,155	Republican hold	Write-In		440	0.05%
2006 Iowa State Auditor Election	Republican hold	David A. Vaudt	Republican	unopposed	
2010 Iowa State Auditor Election; Turnout: 1,059,138	Republican hold	David A. Vaudt	Republican	597,721	56.43%
2010 Iowa State Auditor Election; Turnout: 1,059,138	Republican hold	Jon Murphy	Democratic	460,493	43.48%
2010 Iowa State Auditor Election; Turnout: 1,059,138	Republican hold	Write-In		924	0.09%

Party political offices
Preceded by Richard D. Johnson	Republican nominee for Iowa Auditor of State; 2002, 2006, 2010	Succeeded by Mary Mosiman
Political offices
Preceded by Richard D. Johnson	State Auditor of Iowa; January 2003–April 2013	Succeeded by Mary Mosiman
