= Billie Sue Mosiman =

American writer

Billie Sue Mosiman (born Stahl; June 5, 1947 – December 26, 2018) was an American writer. Mosiman was known for her novels and over 200 short stories that encompassed the genres of horror, science fiction, fantasy, thrillers and suspense fiction.

== Biography ==
Mosiman was born Billie Sue Stahl on June 5, 1947, in Mobile, Alabama. She wrote in her diary at age 13 that she wanted to become a writer. Mosiman attended the University of Alabama in 1965, though left after studying for only two years. She went on to work at Louisville General Hospital in Kentucky and married her husband, Lyle Duane Mosiman, on July 28, 1968. The couple had three children and Mosiman worked as a stay-at-home mother until 1972. In the late 1970s and early 1980s, as a new mother, she began to write.

In 1986, Mosiman opened up a bookstore called Billie's Book World, in Livingston, Texas. She stayed in Texas for the rest of her career.

Mosiman died on December 26, 2018.

== Work ==
Mosiman's wrote horror, science fiction, fantasy and mainstream fiction, emphasizing an "interest in abnormal personalities and the extremes of emotion." Most of her novels are thrillers or suspense and her short stories often feature horror. She has written more than 200 short stories.

Final Cut (2002) is a horror-thriller that centers on a Hollywood publicist and his stalker. Booklist called Final Cut "An entertaining whodunit and an incisive look at Hollywood, where professional and financial self-interest rules." However, Kirkus Reviews found the book's characters to be too "shallow" to connect with. Booklist called Bad Trip South (2004) "Top notch suspense for mature readers."

== Awards and honors ==
Mosiman's novel, Night Cruise (1992) was nominated for an Edgar Allan Poe Award in 1992. Widow (1996), was nominated for a Bram Stoker Award in 1996. She was nominated for a Bram Stoker Award in 2016 for Fright Mare: Women Write Horror (2016).

== Selected bibliography ==
- Wireman. Markham, Ontario: PaperJacks. 1984. ISBN 9780770103033.
- Bloodland. Markham, Ontario: PaperJacks. 1986. ISBN 9780770104177.
- Slice. New York: Pocket Books. 1988. ISBN 9780671658205.
- Deadly Affections. New York: Pocket Books. 1990. ISBN 9780671678746.
- Night Cruise. London: Headline. 1992. ISBN 9780747249368.
- Widow. London: Headline. 1994. ISBN 9780747247425.
- Stilleto. London: Headline Feature. 1995. ISBN 9780747213611.
- Red Moon Rising. New York: DAW Books. 2001. ISBN 9780886779559.
- Malachi's Moon. New York: DAW Books. 2002. ISBN 9780756400484.
- Final Cut. Five Star. 2002. ISBN 9780786241750.
- Craven Moon. New York: DAW Books. 2003. ISBN 9780756401207.
- Dark Matter. Doylestown, Pennsylvania: Betancourt & Co. 2003. ISBN 9781592246168.
- Bad Trip South. Five Star. 2004. ISBN 9781594141058.
- Fright Mare: Women Write Horror. DM Publishing. 2016. ISBN 9781523492602.
