= Iowa Communications Network =

State agency in Iowa, United States

The Iowa Communications Network (ICN) is a state-administered fiber optics network designed to provide equal access to citizens including Iowans with modern telecommunication resources.

== Information ==
The Iowa Communications Network provides data, high-speed Internet connections, security, and voice (telephone) service to a variety of authorized users, which includes state and federal government agencies, K-12 schools, higher education institutions, healthcare and public libraries.

ICN sunsetted its video service in 2020.

== Background ==
Governor Terry Branstad signed an authorizing bill in 1989. In 1991, construction began on Parts I and II of the network when one fiber optic endpoint was installed per county. In 1992 parts of the new fiber-optic system were activated. The network became operational in 1993 and by the next year the new network offered a full motion video connection to all 99 Iowa counties, its 3 state universities, public television, and state government. The Iowa Communications Network became a state agency directed by the Iowa Telecommunications and Technology Commission (ITTC) in 1994.

In 1995, the governor established a plan for Part III of the network. This four-year plan added full-motion video sites to public and private school districts, AEAs, and public libraries throughout Iowa. At the turn of the century the 700th full-motion video classroom was connected to the ICN, surpassing the original plan which only called for a maximum of 500 classrooms. One year later, ICN’s internet bandwidth was brought up to 400 Mbit/s for a faster, more efficient connection. In 2003, the network received a number of upgrades, appropriated through state legislation, which made it one of the most technologically advanced telecommunications services for state government as the time. In 2004, Danville High School was the final site to be added to the Network under Part III legislation.

In March 2005, the ICN became debt free and no longer receives general fund appropriations. To date over 231 million dollars has been invested by state and federal government in the development of the network. http://www.icn.iowa.gov/

ICN sunsetted its video service in 2020.

== Capabilities and uses ==
Iowa Communications Network allows citizens to take advantage of Telemedicine, which makes specialty care more accessible to rural Iowans and simplifies provider education by allowing rural health practitioners to “attend” educational programs without leaving their communities. As well, the Iowa Communications Network has been integrated into a Telejustice system, a way of using two-way interactive video to reduce the expense of expert witnesses and allows crime victims to testify at parole hearings without the inconvenience and tension associated with traveling to a meeting where an inmate was present.

=== Emergency ===
After September 2001, the ICN became an important device for the security of the state of Iowa and its inhabitants. The ICN has been a valuable tool for the National Emergency Action agencies. The Iowa Department of Public Health has used the network to teach medical professionals around the state about bioterrorism. It has reduced response times and assisted in the recovery process during emergencies. http://www.icn.iowa.gov/

Recent legislation now allows Iowa Homeland Security and Emergency Management (HLSEM) to use the ICN when emergencies are declared by the governor. HLSEM can also use the ICN for emergency response training and exercises. It can create a command-to-command communications network that covers the entire state in times of emergency. In the case of an urgent situation, this will allow independent agencies to be organized at the county level as well as being connected on a larger scale with everyone whom the ICN is linked to.

Physically, the central operations hub of the ICN resides within Iowa National Guard State Area Command (STARC) Armory Complex, near Camp Dodge. This grants the network a degree of physical security against disruption in the event of a state or national emergency.

=== Education ===
With sites in over 400 K12 schools, 170 post-secondary institution classrooms, and 50 libraries, providing Educational-access television cable TV capabilities to all Iowans in a cost-effective way remains a core purpose of the ICN. Part of that function is the goal of bringing equal educational opportunities to K-12 students located in rural and underserved areas. ICN also provides Internet bandwidth to school districts and colleges around the state.

ICN makes it possible for instructors and learners physically separated by location to participate in interactive educational events such as college-credit and Advanced Placement classes, classes with shared teachers, and virtual field trips.

Training programs offered by the University of Northern Iowa have helped more than 9000 teachers, medical professionals, librarians, state employees, and other Iowans to use the ICN effectively.

In FY2007, over 50,000 Iowa students and teachers benefited from distance learning opportunities delivered over the Iowa Communications Network. Almost 7,000 of these hours of learning were delivered through Iowa Public Television's K-12 Connections programming, providing opportunities for students, educators, and school personnel to learn through live,

interactive sessions provided at no cost to the students, teachers, or school districts. Through the free K-12 Connections experience, students interact live with presenters and students attending the session from other schools or libraries. Professional development sessions are provided for teachers and other district staff.

=== For the State ===
The ICN buys telecommunications services from private providers in large volume and resells these services to users at a no-profit price. The result is that private sector providers get a large, steady revenue stream. Iowa benefits from the technology investment of providers who deliver service across the ICN. Users in rural communities get affordable services connecting them to the world.

== Broadband Grant ==
On July 2, 2010, ICN receives $16.2 million for broadband infrastructure funding for its “Bridging the Digital Divide for Iowa Communities” grant project.

ICN submitted a Comprehensive Community Infrastructure (CCI) application to the federal Broadband Technology Opportunities Program (BTOP). The CCI project, proposed during the second round, will enhance the Network to a 10 GB/s (10 gigabytes per second) backbone that would reach all 99 counties in Iowa. This middle mile network advancement will also provide 1 GB/s of symmetrical Ethernet connectivity to 1,036 education facilities, hospitals, libraries, public safety, workforce development, and other Community Anchor Institutions throughout the state.

ICN’s CCI grant included partnering efforts with key anchor institutions throughout Iowa, such as Iowa Health System, Sac and Fox Tribe of the Mississippi, community colleges, and several state agencies. ICN’s grant will enable many public and private partnerships to be established, specifically with Iowa’s local telecommunication providers.
