= Iowa National Guard =

US state military

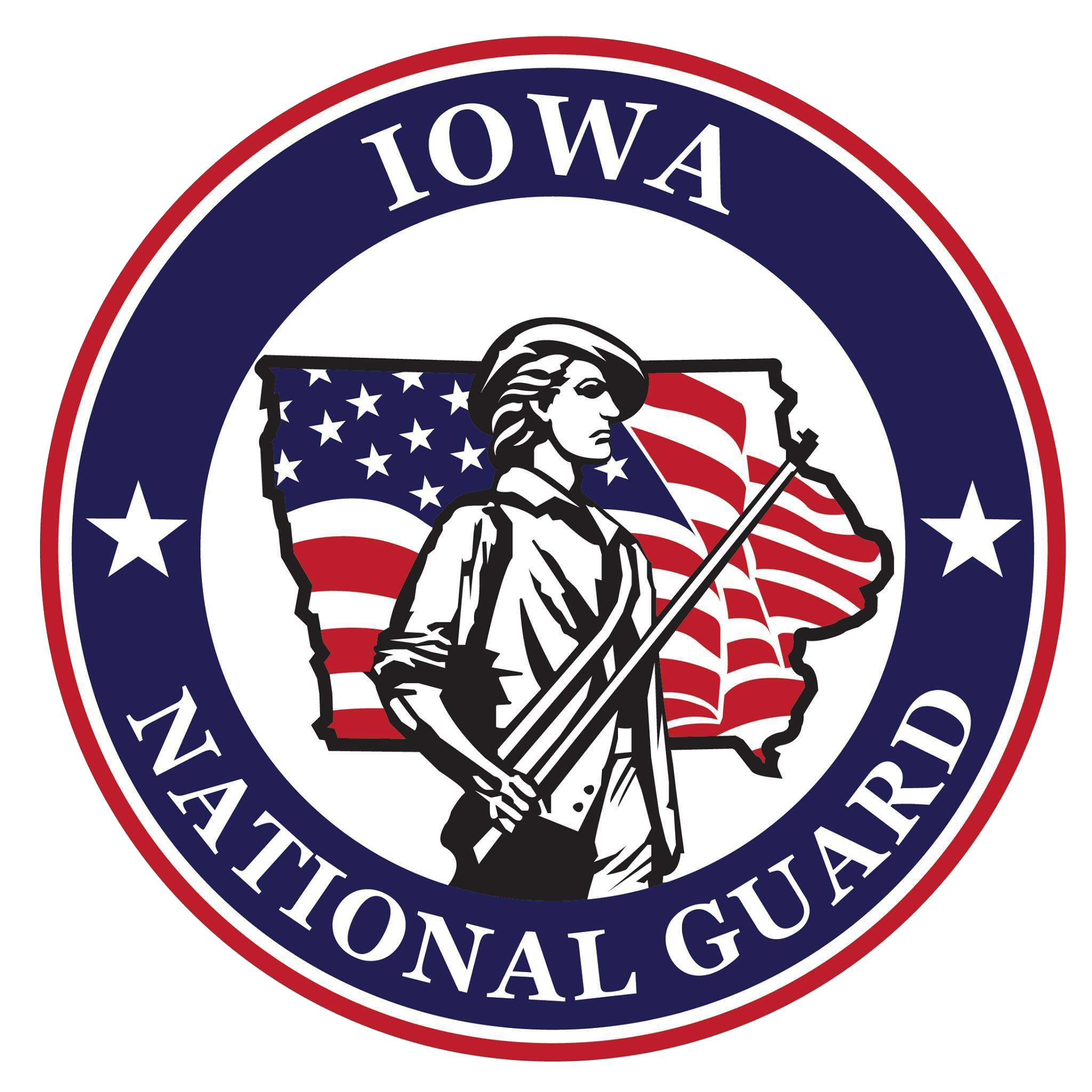
Iowa National Guard logo

The Iowa National Guard consists of the:

- Iowa Army National Guard and the
- Iowa Air National Guard

The Iowa National Guard headquarters is at Camp Dodge in Johnston, several miles north of the state capital Des Moines. The facility serves double duty as a continuity of government facility for the state of Iowa, as well as hosting the central hub of the state's extensive fiber optic network.

When National Guard troops are called to federal service, the president serves as Commander-in-Chief. The federal mission assigned to the National Guard is: "To provide properly trained and equipped units for prompt mobilization for war, National emergency or as otherwise needed."

The governor may call individuals or units of the Iowa National Guard into state service during emergencies or to assist in special situations which lend themselves to use of the National Guard. The state mission assigned to the National Guard is: "To provide trained and disciplined forces for domestic emergencies or as otherwise provided by state law."

== Duties ==
National Guard units can be mobilized at any time by presidential order to supplement regular armed forces, and upon declaration of a state of emergency by the governor of the state in which they serve. Unlike Army Reserve members, National Guard members cannot be mobilized individually (except through voluntary transfers and Temporary Duty Assignments TDY), but only as part of their respective units. However, there has been a significant number of individual activations to support military operations. The legality of this policy is a major issue within the National Guard.

=== Active Duty Callups ===
For much of the final decades of the twentieth century, National Guard personnel typically served "One weekend a month, two weeks a year", with a portion working for the Guard in a full-time capacity. About 2004-05, Army plans for the typical National Guard unit (or National Guardsman) envisaged serving one year of active duty for every three years of service. About 2005-06 Department of Defense policy is that no Guardsman will be involuntarily activated for a total of more than 24 months (cumulative) in one six-year enlistment period (this policy is due to change 1 August 2007, the new policy states that soldiers will be given 24 months between deployments of no more than 24 months, individual states have differing policies).

== See also ==
- Iowa State Guard
