= Iowa Auditor of State =

State constitutional officer who conducts financial audits and investigates fraud in Iowa

State Auditor of Iowa
- State seal

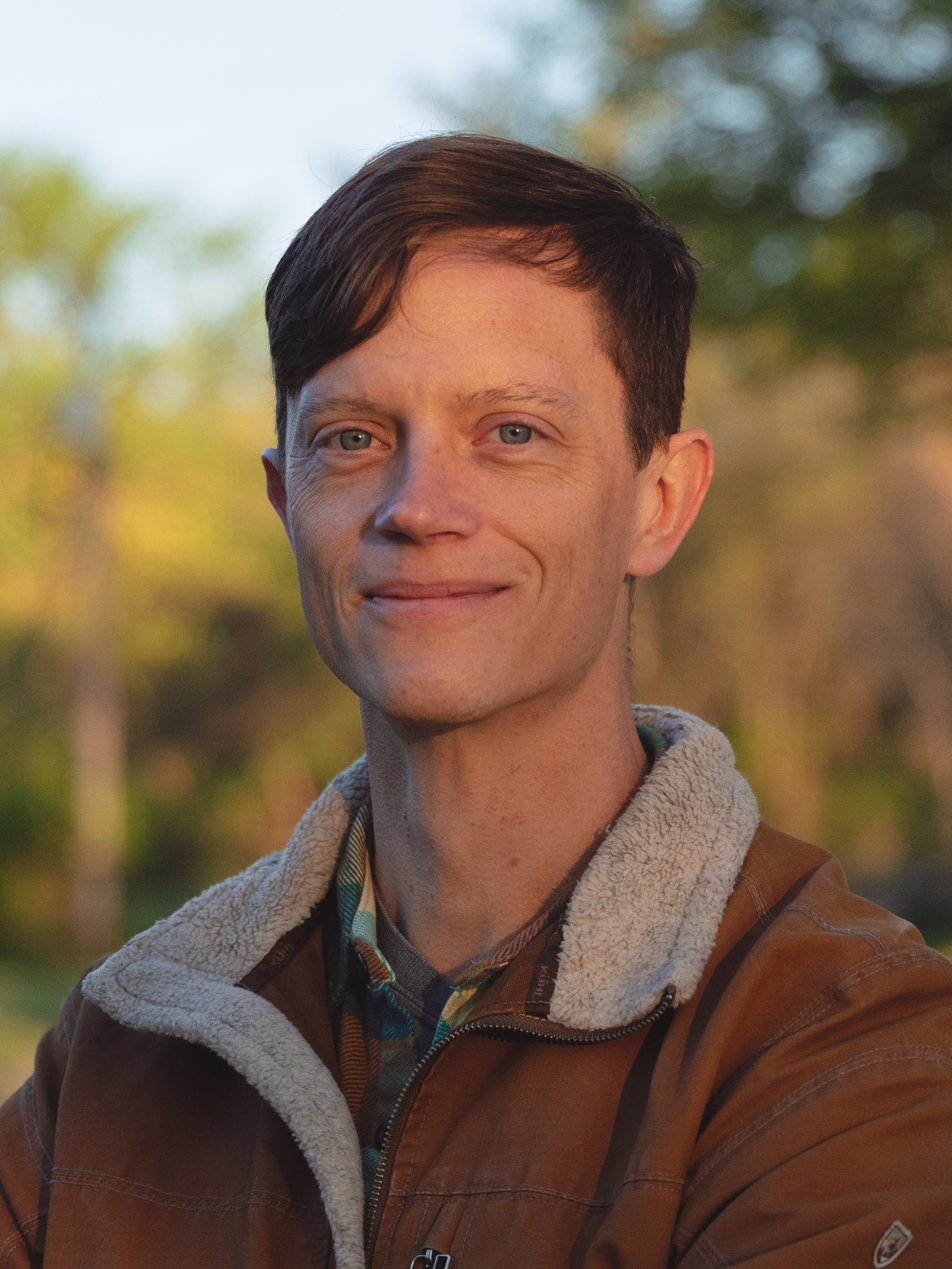
- Incumbent; Rob Sand since January 2, 2019
- Type: State Auditor
- Appointer: Elected
- Term length: 4 years
- Constituting instrument: Constitution of Iowa
- Formation: 1846
- First holder: Joseph T. Fales

The Iowa auditor of state is the state auditor of the government of Iowa, United States. The office's mission is to "serve as the taxpayers' watchdog" by "ensuring that government officials use taxpayer dollars for the intended purposes to benefit the public".

The office is provided for by the Constitution of Iowa, which requires that the auditor be elected every four years, simultaneously with the rest of the state's executive branch, in midterm elections. The auditor is required to make a complete audit of the financial accounts of every department of the government of Iowa annually. The office supervised by the auditor of state includes three divisions: Administration, Financial Audit, and Performance Investigation. The powers of the auditor to request information and file lawsuits were restricted by Senate File 478, a bill signed into law in June 2023.

== List of auditors ==
No.	Image	Name	Took office	Left office	Party
1		Joseph T. Fales	1846	1849	Democratic
2		William Pattee	1850	1854	Democratic
3		Andrew J. Stevens	1854	1855	Whig
4		John Pattee	1855	1859	Republican
5		Jonathan W. Battell	1859	1865	Republican
6		John A. Elliott	1865	1871	Republican
7		John Russell	1871	1875	Republican
8		Buren R. Sherman	1875	1881	Republican
9		William V. Lucas	1881	1883	Republican
10		John L. Brown	1883	1885	Republican
11		Jonathan W. Battell	1885	1886	Republican
12		John L. Brown	1886	1886	Republican
13		Charles Beardsley	1886	1886	Republican
14		John L. Brown	1886	1887	Republican
15		Hames A. Lyons	1887	1893	Republican
16		Cornelius G. McCarthy	1893	1899	Republican
17		Frank F. Merriam	1899	1903	Republican
18		Beryl F. Carroll	1903	1909	Republican
19		John L. Bleakly	1909	1915	Republican
20		Frank S. Shaw	1915	1921	Republican
21		Glenn C. Haynes	January 1, 1921	August 31, 1924	Republican
22		James E. Thomas	September 1, 1924	January 1, 1925	Republican
23		James C. McClune	January 1, 1925	January 1, 1927	Republican
24		James W. Long	January 1, 1927	April 21, 1932	Republican
25		C. Fred Porter (Acting)	April 21, 1932	January 1, 1933	Republican
26		Charles W. Storms	January 2, 1933	January 3, 1939	Democratic
27		C. B. Akers	January 3, 1939	January 2, 1965	Republican
28		Lorne R. Worthington	January 2, 1965	January 1, 1967	Democratic
29		Lloyd R. Smith	January 1, 1967	December 21, 1978	Republican
30		Richard D. Johnson	January 26, 1979	January 3, 2003	Republican
31		David Vaudt	January 3, 2003	May 3, 2013	Republican
32		Mary Mosiman	May 13, 2013	January 2, 2019	Republican
33		Rob Sand	January 2, 2019	Incumbent	Democratic
34		Taylor Wettach	Takes Office: January 2, 2027	Auditor-elect	Democratic
