= Mary Mosiman =

American politician (born 1962)

Mary L. Mosiman

Director of the Iowa Department of Revenue
- Incumbent
- Assumed office March 29, 2023
- Governor: Kim Reynolds
- Preceded by: Kraig Paulsen

32nd Iowa State Auditor
- In office May 13, 2013 – January 2, 2019
- Governor: Terry Branstad; Kim Reynolds
- Preceded by: David Vaudt
- Succeeded by: Rob Sand

Deputy of Elections for the Secretary of State of Iowa
- In office January 2011 – May 2013
- Governor: Chet Culver; Terry Branstad

Story County Auditor
- In office January 2001 – December 2010
- Preceded by: Judy Emmons
- Succeeded by: Lucy Martin

Personal details
- Born: Mary L. Penning; February 13, 1962 (age 64) Ames, Iowa, U.S.
- Party: Republican
- Spouse: Dan Mosiman (m. 1982)
- Children: 4
- Education: Iowa State University (BS)

Mary L. Mosiman (née Penning, born February 13, 1962) is an American Republican politician who served as the 32nd Iowa Auditor of State.

== Early life ==
Mosiman was born Ames, Iowa in 1962 to Leonard and Bernice (née Fisher) Penning. She grew up in Hubbard, Iowa.

She graduated from Hubbard High School. She earned a bachelor's degree in business and accounting from Iowa State University. She then became a Certified Public Accountant in 2003. She resides in Ames.

== Political career ==
=== Story County Auditor ===
She served as Story County auditor from 2001 to 2010.

In 2000, she ran against incumbent Judy Emmons, winning with 19,423 votes against Emmons' 13,516 votes.

In 2004, she ran against Iowa State University political science professor Jim Hutter, winning with 24,295 votes against to Hutter's 16,638 votes.

In 2008, she ran unopposed.

She resigned in December 2010 to join the Secretary of State's office in January 2011. She was succeeded by her Deputy Auditor, Lucy Martin, who continues to serve as Story County Auditor as of 2025.

=== Secretary of State ===
She then served as Deputy of Elections for the Secretary of State of Iowa from 2011 to 2013, under Governors Chet Culver and Terry Branstad.

=== Auditor of State ===
She was appointed by Governor Terry Branstad to the position of Auditor of State on May 13, 2013, filling a vacancy created when David A. Vaudt resigned.

In 2014, she ran against Democrat Jonathan Neiderbach. She won 604,103 votes against Neiderbach's 456,525 votes.

In 2018, she ran against Democrat Rob Sand and Libertarian Fred Perryman. Mosiman lost with 601,320 votes to Sand's 660,169 votes and Perryman's 33,421 votes.

=== Department of Revenue ===
She then served as the Iowa Department of Revenue's (IDR) Deputy Director and Tax Management Division Administrator from March 7, 2019 to March 29, 2023. In March 2023, she was appointed as Director of the IDR by Governor Reynolds.

== Personal life ==
She married Dan Mosiman in 1982 and has four daughters.

== Electoral history ==
Election	Political result	Candidate	Party	Votes	%
2014 Iowa State Auditor Election; Turnout: 1,052,771	Republican hold	Mary Mosiman	Republican	599,440	56.94%
2014 Iowa State Auditor Election; Turnout: 1,052,771	Republican hold	Jonathan Neiderbach	Democratic	451,868	42.92%
2014 Iowa State Auditor Election; Turnout: 1,052,771	Republican hold	Write-in		1477	0.1%
2018 Iowa State Auditor Election; Electorate: 2,167,914; Turnout: 1,295,368 (61.55%)	Democratic gain from Republican	Rob Sand	Democratic	660,169	50.96%
2018 Iowa State Auditor Election; Electorate: 2,167,914; Turnout: 1,295,368 (61.55%)	Democratic gain from Republican	Mary Mosiman	Republican	601,320	46.42%
2018 Iowa State Auditor Election; Electorate: 2,167,914; Turnout: 1,295,368 (61.55%)	Democratic gain from Republican	Fred Perryman	Libertarian	33,421	2.58%
2018 Iowa State Auditor Election; Electorate: 2,167,914; Turnout: 1,295,368 (61.55%)	Democratic gain from Republican	Write-in		458	0.04%

Party political offices
Preceded by David A. Vaudt	Republican nominee for Iowa Auditor of State; 2014, 2018	Succeeded by Todd Halbur
Political offices
Preceded by David Vaudt	Auditor of Iowa; 2013–2019	Succeeded by Rob Sand
