= Iowa's 19th House of Representatives district =

American legislative district

House District 19
- Type: District of the Lower house
- Location: Iowa
- Representative: Brent Siegrist
- Parent organization: Iowa General Assembly

The 19th District of the Iowa House of Representatives in the state of Iowa is part of Pottawattamie County.

== Current elected officials ==
Brent Siegrist is the representative currently representing the district.

== Past representatives ==
The district has previously been represented by:

- George Washington Ball, 1888–1892
- George Washington Ball, 1915–1917
- LeRoy Wilfred Chalupa, 1955–1965
- Maynard Menefee, 1971–1973
- Joseph W. Clark, 1973–1974
- Thomas J. Jochum, 1975–1983
- Lowell Norland, 1983–1987
- Dennis J. May, 1987–1991
- Merlin Bartz, 1991–1993
- Gary Blodgett, 1993–2001
- Roger A. Broers, 2001–2003
- Ervin Dennis, 2003–2005
- Bob Kressig, 2005–2013
- Ralph Watts, 2013–2019
- Chris Hagenow, 2019–2021
- Carter Nordman, 2021–2023
