= Benton Community High School =

Public secondary school in Van Horne, Iowa, United States

Location
- 600 1st Street; Van Horne, Iowa 52346; United States; 42.012876°N 92.087262°W

Information
- Type: Public secondary
- Established: 1964
- School district: Benton Community School District
- Principal: James Bieschke
- Teaching staff: 28.14 (FTE)
- Grades: 9–12
- Enrollment: 473 (2024-2025)
- Colors: Blue and yellow
- Athletics conference: WaMaC Conference
- Nickname: Bobcats
- Rival: Vinton-Shellsburg
- Website: www.benton.k12.ia.us/o/bmshs

Benton Community High School is a rural public high school located in Van Horne, Iowa. It is the only high school in the Benton Community School District, and serves students from Van Horne, Atkins, Blairstown, Elberon, Keystone, Newhall, Norway and Watkins.

== History ==
While the Benton Community School District was formed in 1964, Benton Community High School did not open until the fall of 1965. The new BCHS drew students from the former Keystone School District, Van Horne School District, Newhall School District and Blairstown School District. Beginning in 1967, BCHS absorbed students from the former Elberon Independent School District. In a controversial 1991 decision, nearby Norway High School was merged into BCHS.

== Demographics ==
The student body of BCHS is 96 percent white, two percent Hispanic, and one percent black, while all other races make up the remaining one percent.

== Athletics ==
Benton Community's athletic teams compete in the WaMaC Conference in the following sports: baseball, basketball, cross country, football, golf, soccer, softball, track and field, volleyball and wrestling.

State Championships
Sport	Year(s)
Baseball	1971
Cross country (girls)	1998, 1999, 2000
Softball	1966, 1998, 2016
Track and field (girls)	1997, 2007, 2008

== Performing arts ==
BCHS also has a competitive marching band program.

== Notable alumni ==
- Amber Fiser, softball player
- Thomas Gerhold, member of the Iowa House of Representatives
- Chad Hennings, American football player

== See also ==
- List of high schools in Iowa
