= Bob Kressig =

American politician

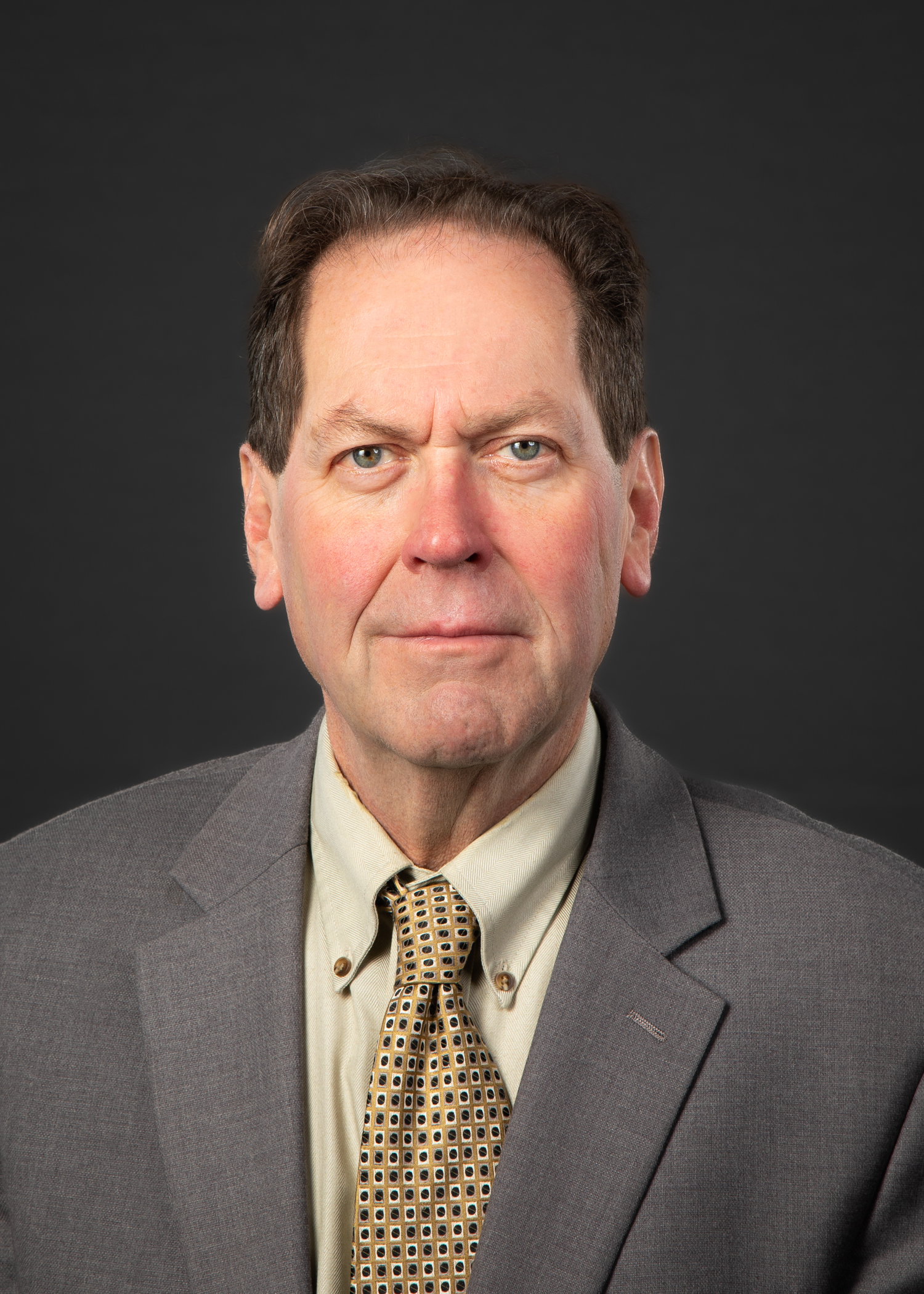

Member of the Iowa House of Representatives from the 75th district
- Incumbent
- Assumed office January 10, 2005
- Preceded by: Ervin Dennis
- Succeeded by: Drew Stensland (elect)

Personal details
- Born: December 31, 1953 (age 72) Dubuque, Iowa, U.S.
- Party: Democratic
- Spouse: Liz
- Children: Molly and Laura
- Website: Representative Bob Kressig

Bob Kressig (born December 31, 1953, in Dubuque, Iowa) is the Iowa State Representative from the 75th District. He has served in the Iowa House of Representatives since January 2005. Kressig will retire from the Iowa House at the end of the 2026 legislative session and gave his retirement speech on April 1.

Kressig currently serves on several committees in the Iowa House – Commerce, Environmental Protection, Local Government, and Public Safety. He also serves on the Transportation, Infrastructure, and Capitals Appropriations Subcommittee.

== Electoral history ==
Kressig was re-elected in 2006 with 5,171 votes (50%), defeating Republican opponent Matt Reisetter.

In 2010 Kressig was re-elected to the Iowa House of Representatives District 19, defeating Republican Darin Beck.

Bob Kressig (D) (5550 votes) (52.12%)
Darin Beck (R) (5066 votes) (47.58%)
write in (32 votes) (0.3%)

Because of redistricting, most of House District 19 was renamed House District 59. Kressig won election for House District 59 in the 2012 general election. After more redistricting, Kressig ran for House District 75 in the 2022 election cycle. He was reelected to his eleventh and final term in the Iowa House during the 2024 general election.

== Early life and education ==
Kressig attended Sacred Heart Catholic School, Columbus High School and in 1972 graduated from Waterloo West High. After graduating high school, he started working at John Deere. He also attended Hawkeye Tech and took classes at the University of Northern Iowa where he received a postsecondary teaching license.

== Career ==
Outside politics Kressig spent 31 years working for John Deere where he retired in 2003.

== Organizations ==
Kressig is or has been a member of the following of organizations:

- Veridian Credit Union Board
- Planning and Zoning Commission of Cedar Falls
- Cedar Valleys Promise Policy Board
- University of Northern Iowa's Metal Casting Center Board of Directors
- North Star Community Services Board of Directors
- Senior Coordinating Living Unit in Des Moines.
- UAW Local 838 retirees group
- Cedar Falls Lions Club
- Cedar Valley Cyclists, formerly Rainbow Cyclists, in Cedar Falls, Waterloo, and surrounding area
- Nazareth Lutheran Church, in Cedar Falls

== Family ==
Kressig is the son of Bob and Verdie Kressig. He has two sisters, Kudy Beckmann and Peggy Kane. Kressig married his wife Liz in 1978. Together they have two daughters, Molly and Laura and four grandchildren. Kressig and his wife live in Cedar Falls, Iowa.

Iowa House of Representatives
Preceded by Thomas Gerhold	75th District; 2023 – present	Succeeded by Incumbent
Preceded by Chris Hagenow	59th District; 2013 – 2023	Succeeded by Sharon Steckman
Preceded by Ervin Dennis	19th District; 2005–2013	Succeeded by
