= Danny Carroll (Iowa politician) =

American politician (born 1953)

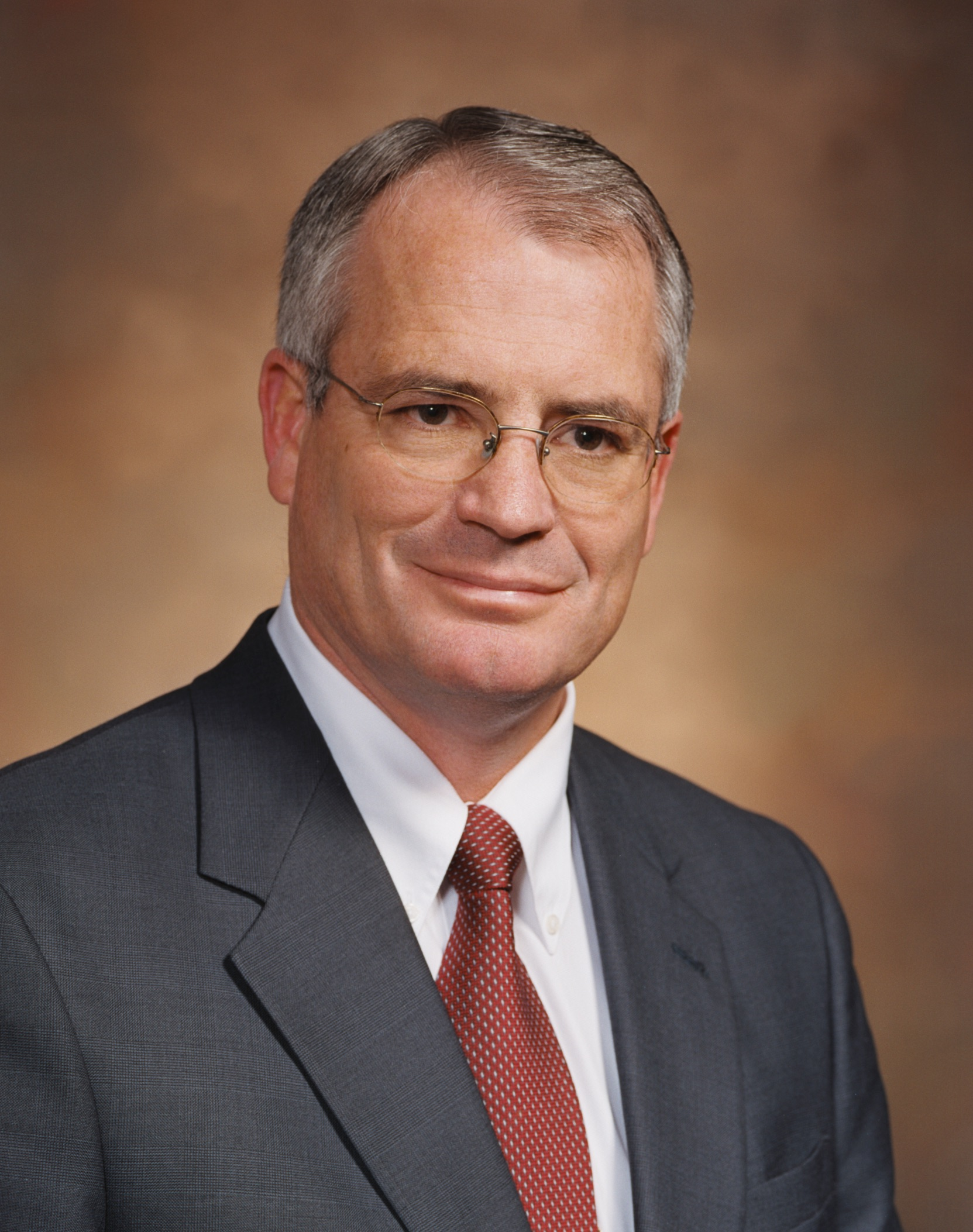
- Carroll in 2003

Chair of the Iowa Republican Party
- In office March 29, 2014 – June 28, 2014
- Preceded by: A. J. Spiker
- Succeeded by: Jeff Kaufmann

Member of the Iowa House of Representatives from the 75th district
- In office January 13, 2003 – January 7, 2007
- Preceded by: Janet Metcalf
- Succeeded by: Eric Palmer

Member of the Iowa House of Representatives from the 58th district
- In office January 9, 1995 – January 13, 2003
- Preceded by: Dennis Black
- Succeeded by: Clel Baudler

Personal details
- Born: August 19, 1953 (age 73) Colorado Springs, Colorado, U.S.
- Party: Republican
- Spouse: Joy
- Children: 3
- Occupation: community relations, real estate, businessman

Danny C. Carroll (born August 19, 1953) is an American politician in the state of Iowa.

Carroll was born in Colorado Springs, Colorado and attended Milligan College. A Republican, he served in the Iowa House of Representatives from 1995 to 2007 (58th district from 1995 to 2003 and 75th district from 2003 to 2007).
