= Drew Stensland =

American politician

Member-elect of the Iowa House of Representatives from the 75th district
- Assuming office January 2027
- Succeeding: Bob Kressig

Personal details
- Party: Democratic

Drew Stensland is an American politician. A member of the Democratic Party, he is the member-elect for the 75th district of the Iowa House of Representatives.
