= Strawn (surname) =

Strawn is a surname. Notable people with the surname include:

- Brad Strawn, American psychologist and theologian
- Joshua Strawn (born 1976), American musician, songwriter, and record producer
- Matt Strawn (born 1974), American businessman and politician
- Silas H. Strawn (1866–1946), American lawyer
