= Iowa's 75th House of Representatives district =

American legislative district

House District 75
- Type: District of the Lower house
- Location: Iowa
- Representative: Bob Kressig
- Parent organization: Iowa General Assembly

The 75th District of the Iowa House of Representatives in the state of Iowa. It is currently composed of part of Black Hawk County.

== List of representatives ==
The district has been represented by:

- Edgar H. Holden, 1971–1973
- David M. Stanley, 1973–1975
- Otto H. Nealson, 1975–1977
- Betty Hoffmann-Bright, 1977–1983
- Ward Handorf, 1983–1987
- Jane Svoboda, 1987–1993
- Janet Metcalf, 1993–2003
- Danny Carroll, 2003–2007
- Eric Palmer, 2007–2011
- Guy Vander Linden, 2011–2013
- Dawn Pettengill, 2013–2019
- Thomas Gerhold, 2019–2023
- Bob Kressig, 2023–2027
