= Menifee (disambiguation) =

Menifee (1996–2019) was an American Thoroughbred racehorse.

Menifee may also refer to:

- Menifee County, Kentucky
- Menifee, California
- Menifee, Arkansas

== See also ==
- Menefee, surname
