= NGPA =

NGPA can refer to

- National General Practice Accreditation medical scheme of Royal Australian College of General Practitioners, Australia
- National Portrait Gallery of Australia in Canberra
- Natural Gas Policy Act of 1978
- Next Generation Public Affairs, American firm co-founded by Matt Strawn and Pat Brady
