= Strawn =

Strawn may refer to:

== Places ==
- Strawn, Illinois
- Strawn, Texas
- Strawn Pass, mountain pass of Antarctica

== Other uses ==
- Strawn (surname)
