= Chad Hennings =

American football player (born 1965)

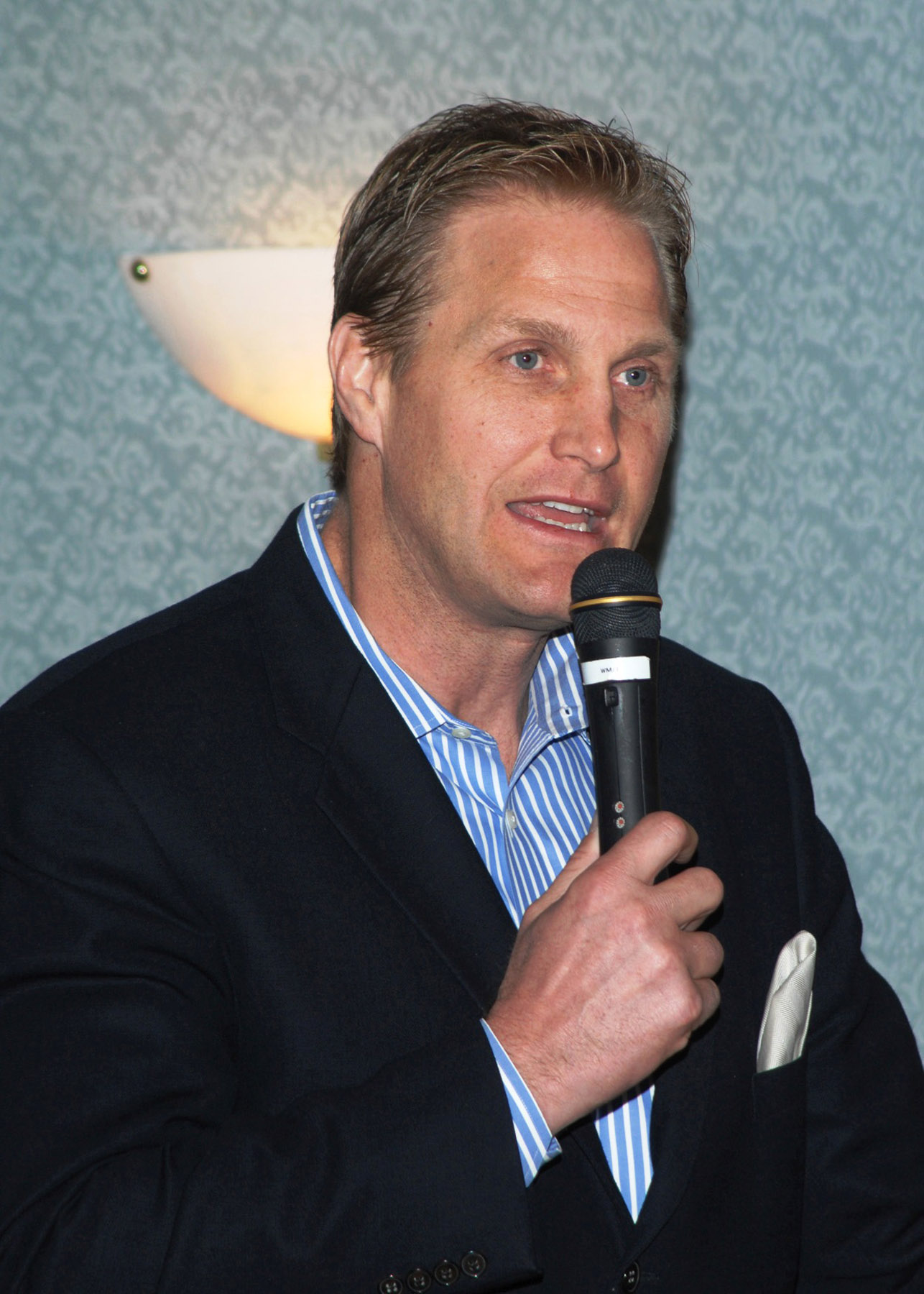
- Hennings at a speaking engagement

No. 95
- Position: Defensive tackle

Personal information
- Born: October 20, 1965 (age 61); Elberon, Iowa, U.S.
- Listed height: 6 ft 6 in (1.98 m)
- Listed weight: 287 lb (130 kg)

Career information
- High school: Benton (Van Horne, Iowa)
- College: Air Force (1984–1987)
- NFL draft: 1988: 11th round, 290th overall pick

Career history
- Dallas Cowboys (1988–2000)

Awards and highlights
- 3× Super Bowl champion (XXVII, XXVIII, XXX); Outland Trophy (1987); UPI Lineman of the Year (1987); Unanimous All-American (1987); WAC Defensive Player of the year (1987); 2× First-team All-WAC (1986, 1987); NCAA Silver Anniversary Award (2013); Walter Camp Alumni of the Year (2014)

Career NFL statistics
- Tackles: 269
- Sacks: 27.5
- Forced fumbles: 5
- Fumble recoveries: 6
- Defensive touchdowns: 1
- Stats at Pro Football Reference
- College Football Hall of Fame

Chad William Hennings (born October 20, 1965) is an American former professional football player who was a defensive tackle for the Dallas Cowboys of the National Football League (NFL). He played college football for the Air Force Falcons, earning unanimous All-American honors and winning the Outland Trophy in 1987.

Facing an obligation to enter the Air Force upon graduating from the Academy, Hennings was selected in the 11th round of the 1988 NFL draft by the Cowboys. He played in the NFL from 1992 to 2000, winning three Super Bowls.

== Early life and college ==
While at Benton Community High School in Van Horne, Iowa, Hennings became an All-state football tight end and the state heavyweight wrestling champion his senior year.

After being offered full scholarships from different universities he chose to attend the United States Air Force Academy, near Colorado Springs. Lettering as a freshman in 1984, he started his college football career as a tight end before being switched to the defensive line as a sophomore.

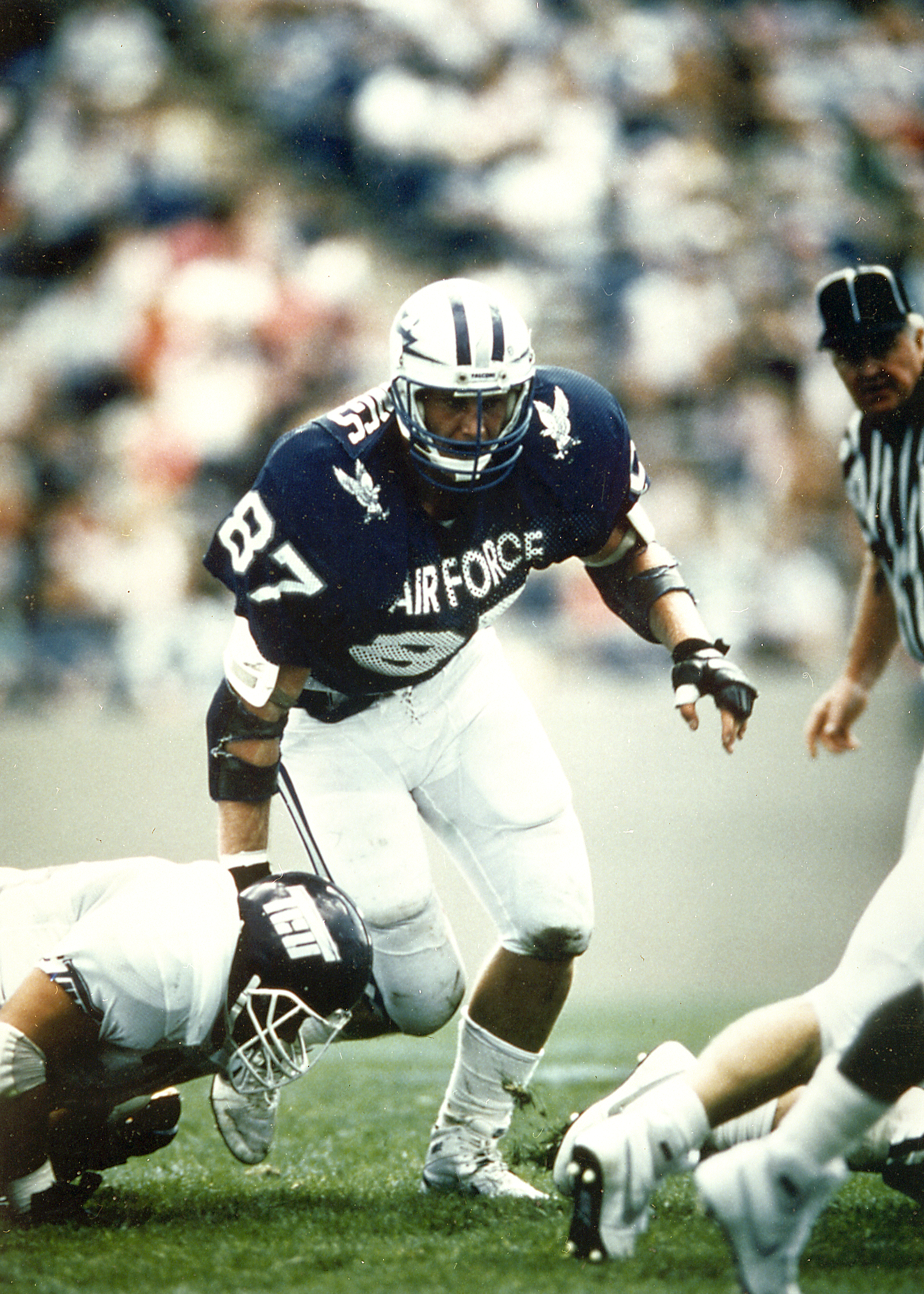
Hennings at Air Force

Hennings was moved to defensive tackle in his sophomore season, became a starter and made the All--WAC second-team. That 1985 season was the greatest in Air Force history as the Falcons went 12–1, were conference co-champions, defeated Texas in the Bluebonnet Bowl and placed fifth in the final coaches poll. During his junior year in 1986, he became a dominant defensive player, was named to the first of two All-Conference teams, the first of two Academic All-American teams and the second of three Academic All-WAC honors.

His senior year in 1987, he led the nation with 24 sacks, was a unanimous first-team All-American selection, received the Stan Bates Award as the conference's top scholar-athlete, earned defensive player of the year honors from the Western Athletic Conference and the Outland Trophy as the nation's top interior lineman. He also played in numerous postseason all-star games including the Japan Bowl and the East-West Shrine Game.

Hennings is a member of the Western Athletic Conference all-time team and was named WAC defensive player of the decade for the 1980s. He was inducted into the Colorado Springs Sports Hall of Fame in 2004, the Colorado Sports Hall of Fame in 2005, the College Football Hall of Fame in 2006, and was in the inaugural class of the Air Force Academy Athletics Hall of Fame in 2007. He was also inducted into the GTE Academic All-American Hall of Fame.

== USAF ==
After graduating from the U.S. Air Force Academy in June 1988, Hennings entered undergraduate pilot training at Sheppard Air Force Base, in Wichita Falls, Texas, as part of the Euro-NATO Joint Jet Pilot Training (ENJJPT) Program conducted by the 80th Flying Training Wing. ENJJPT is an elite program, and when his ground training studies faltered (he had been an honor student at AFA), his squadron commander isolated him from all contact regarding the Dallas Cowboys, who had drafted him in April 1989. After UPT, Hennings completed Lead-In Fighter Training and because of his size, was eligible only for F-111, F-15 Eagle, or A-10 Thunderbolt II RTU. He became an A-10 pilot and was assigned to the 92d Tactical Fighter Squadron, a unit of the 81st Tactical Fighter Wing based at RAF Bentwaters in the United Kingdom, in June 1990.

While with the 92d TFS, Hennings deployed twice to the Persian Gulf. From April to June 1991, and October 1991 to January 1992, based at Incirlik Air Base, Turkey, Henning flew 45 A-10 missions in support of Operation Provide Comfort, an effort that helped provide relief and humanitarian aid to Kurdish refugees in northern Iraq. He was twice awarded the Air Force Achievement Medal, a humanitarian award and an Outstanding Unit Award for his actions in the service. He was promoted to captain on June 1, 1992.

Between 1992–2008, he was assigned to U.S. Air Force Reserve Command and HQ (Staff) US Air Force Academy.

== Awards, decorations and honors ==

| Badge | US Air Force Senior Pilot Badge | | |
| 1st row | Aerial Achievement Medal with one oak leaf cluster | | |
| 2nd row | Air Force Outstanding Unit Award | Combat Readiness Medal | Army of Occupation Medal |
| 3rd row | National Defense Service Medal with bronze service star | Southwest Asia Service Medal with service star | Global War on Terrorism Service Medal |
| 4th row | Humanitarian Service Medal | Air Force Overseas Short Tour Service Ribbon | Air Force Overseas Long Tour Service Ribbon |
| 5th row | Air Force Longevity Service Award with three bronze oak leaf clusters | Small Arms Expert Marksmanship Ribbon | Air Force Training Ribbon |

== Football career ==
Because of his military commitment (originally 8 years because he chose to fly), he dropped in the 1988 NFL draft until the Dallas Cowboys took a chance and selected him in the eleventh round, with no indication of an early out from the Air Force. President and general manager Tex Schramm had also secured his rights by signing him to a multi-year contract with a $25,000 bonus in 1988.

After the 1991 Gulf War, the United States military underwent an across the board reduction in budget and Hennings was able to have the remaining four years of his active-duty commitment (service academy and rated pilot) waived, which was unprecedented at the time. He continued service in the Air Force Reserve for nine years as a liaison officer to the Air Force Academy after his separation from active duty, then went into the Individual Ready Reserve.

While entering into the NFL, there were some rumors about the Cowboys trading him to the Denver Broncos, but when Jimmy Johnson saw his workout for the team, those plans were canceled.

In 1992, he left the U.S. Air Force and joined the Dallas Cowboys as a 26-year-old rookie, playing on special teams and quickly becoming a key reserve, on one of the best defensive line rotations in the NFL.

In 1995, he registered his first starts while Leon Lett was serving a four-game suspension. The next year, he replaced Russell Maryland who left via free agency to the Oakland Raiders.

While his play on the field was impressive, his attitude, character, and leadership were equally important to the Cowboys’ success during that decade. Together, these qualities helped shape the top-ranked defenses of the early nineties and contributed to the team winning three Super Bowls in four years.

He spent nine seasons with the team, before retiring after missing half of the 2000 season with injuries. He finished with 27.5 sacks, 6 fumble recoveries and one touchdown in 107 games.

== Personal life ==
Hennings is married and has two children. Following his football career, Hennings became a Christian motivational speaker and author. His self-help book for men, "Rules of Engagement: Finding Friendship, Faith, and Strength in a Disconnected World" was published in 2009.

In November 2012, Hennings was named as a 2013 recipient of the NCAA Silver Anniversary Award, presented each year to six distinguished former college student-athletes on the 25th anniversary of the completion of their college sports careers.
