= Iowa's 84th House of Representatives district =

American legislative district

House District 84
- Type: District of the Lower house
- Location: Iowa
- Representative: Thomas Gerhold
- Parent organization: Iowa General Assembly

The 84th District of the Iowa House of Representatives in the state of Iowa. It is currently composed of part of Benton and Linn counties since the redistricting became official on January 1, 2023.

== Current elected officials ==
Thomas Gerhold is the representative currently representing the district.

== Past representatives ==
The district has previously been represented by:

- Andrew Varley, 1971–1973
- William R. Monroe, 1973–1979
- Larry Kirkenslager, 1979–1982
- Elaine Baxter, 1982–1983
- Jack Holveck, 1983–1993
- Brent Siegrist, 1993–2003
- Jamie Van Fossen, 2003–2007
- Elesha Gayman, 2007–2011
- Ross Paustian, 2011–2013
- Dave Heaton, 2013–2019
- Joe Mitchell, 2019–2023
- Thomas Gerhold, 2023–Present
