= Lowell Norland =

American politician

Lowell E. Norland
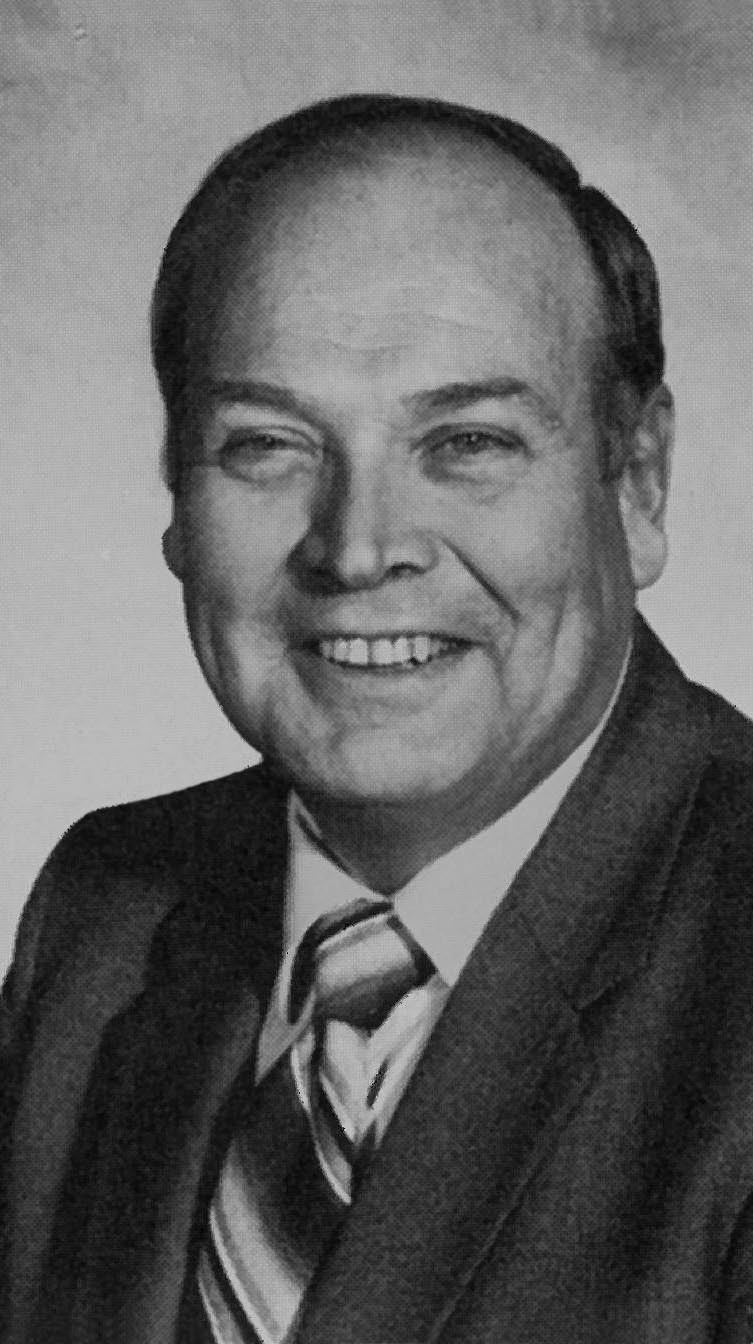

Member of the Iowa House of Representatives from the 12th district
- In office January 8, 1973 – January 9, 1983
- Preceded by: Luvern Kehe
- Succeeded by: Josephine Gruhn

Member of the Iowa House of Representatives from the 19th district
- In office January 10, 1983 – January 11, 1987
- Preceded by: Thomas J. Jochum
- Succeeded by: Dennis J. May

Personal details
- Born: August 14, 1931 (age 94) Mason City, Iowa, U.S.
- Party: Democratic
- Spouse: Donna Kingland (d. 2017)
- Children: 4
- Occupation: Farmer

Lowell E. Norland (born August 14, 1931) is an American former politician in the state of Iowa.

Norland was born in Mason City, Iowa. He attended the University of Northern Iowa and was a farmer. He served in the Iowa House of Representatives from 1973 to 1987, as a Democrat. He was majority leader of the house from 1983 to 1987.
