= Menefee =

Menefee is a surname. Notable people with the surname include:

- Christian Menefee (born 1988), American attorney and U.S. representative for Texas's 18th congressional district
- Curt Menefee (born 1965), American sports announcer
- David Menefee, American writer
- Hawkins Menefee (1945–1974), American politician from Texas
- Jock Menefee (1868–1953), American baseball player
- Maynard Menefee (1907–1993), American politician from Iowa
- Richard Menefee (1809–1841), American politician from Kentucky

== See also ==
- Menefee Peak, mountain in Colorado, United States
- Menefee Formation, geological formation
- Menefee Shale, geological stratum
