= Iowa's 12th House of Representatives district =

American legislative district

House District 12
- Type: District of the Lower house
- Location: Iowa
- Representative: Steven Holt
- Parent organization: Iowa General Assembly

The 12th District of the Iowa House of Representatives in the state of Iowa. It currently comprises Ida and Crawford Counties, as well as part of Shelby County.

== Current elected officials ==
Steven Holt is the representative currently representing the district.

== Past representatives ==
The district has previously been represented by:

- Luvern W. Kehe, 1971–1973
- Lowell Norland, 1973–1983
- Josephine Gruhn, 1983–1993
- Don Gries, 1993–1999
- Clarence Hoffman, 1999–2003
- Linda Upmeyer, 2003–2013
- Dan Muhlbauer, 2013–2015
- Brian Best, 2015–2023
