= Silver Anniversary Awards =

- Awarded for: six distinguished former student-athletes on their 25th anniversary as college graduates
- Country: United States
- Presented by: National Collegiate Athletic Association (NCAA)
- First award: 1973
- Website: http://www.ncaa.org/about/resources/events/awards/silver-anniversary-award

The Silver Anniversary Awards are awarded every year by the American National Collegiate Athletic Association (NCAA) to recognize six distinguished former student-athletes on their 25th anniversary as college graduates. The Silver Anniversary Awards were first given in 1973, when five distinguished former student-athletes were honored, including Stewart Udall, Donald Mulder, John Hopper, John Ferraro, and Ray Evans. Since 1986, the number of annual honorees has increased to six.

In order to be eligible, the nominee must be a college graduate, must have competed in intercollegiate competition 25 years before the NCAA convention date, must be a varsity letter winner at an NCAA member institution and, must have achieved personal distinction since their graduation. One-third of the selection criteria are based on the nominee’s achievements during their time as a prominent collegiate athlete, while the other two-thirds are determined by the nominee’s career achievements, including professional, charitable and civic contributions.

== Recipients ==
The NCAA announced the 2020 winners in December 2019, congratulating Carla Ainsworth, Stewart Cink, Darren Eales, Jenny Thompson, Rebecca Lobo and Adam Vinatieri.

The NCAA announced the 2019 winners in December 2018, congratulating Tim Cullen, Mia Hamm, David Hirsch, Lisa Leslie, Heath Shuler, and Jason Varitek.

Previous recipients of the Silver Anniversary Awards include Troy Aikman and Dara Torres (both 2014), Gail Devers and Chad Hennings (both 2013), David Robinson (2012), Joe Girardi and Bo Jackson (both 2011), Doug Flutie and Jackie Joyner-Kersee (both 2010), Steve Young (2009), Mike Singletary (2006), Mark Johnson (2005), John Naber (2002), Steve Largent (2001) Archie Griffin (2001), Bill Walton (1999), Sally Ride (1998), Jack Youngblood (1996), Kareem Abdul-Jabbar (1994), Jim Ryun (1994) and Dick Butkus (1990).
