= Thomas J. Jochum =

American politician (1951–2020)

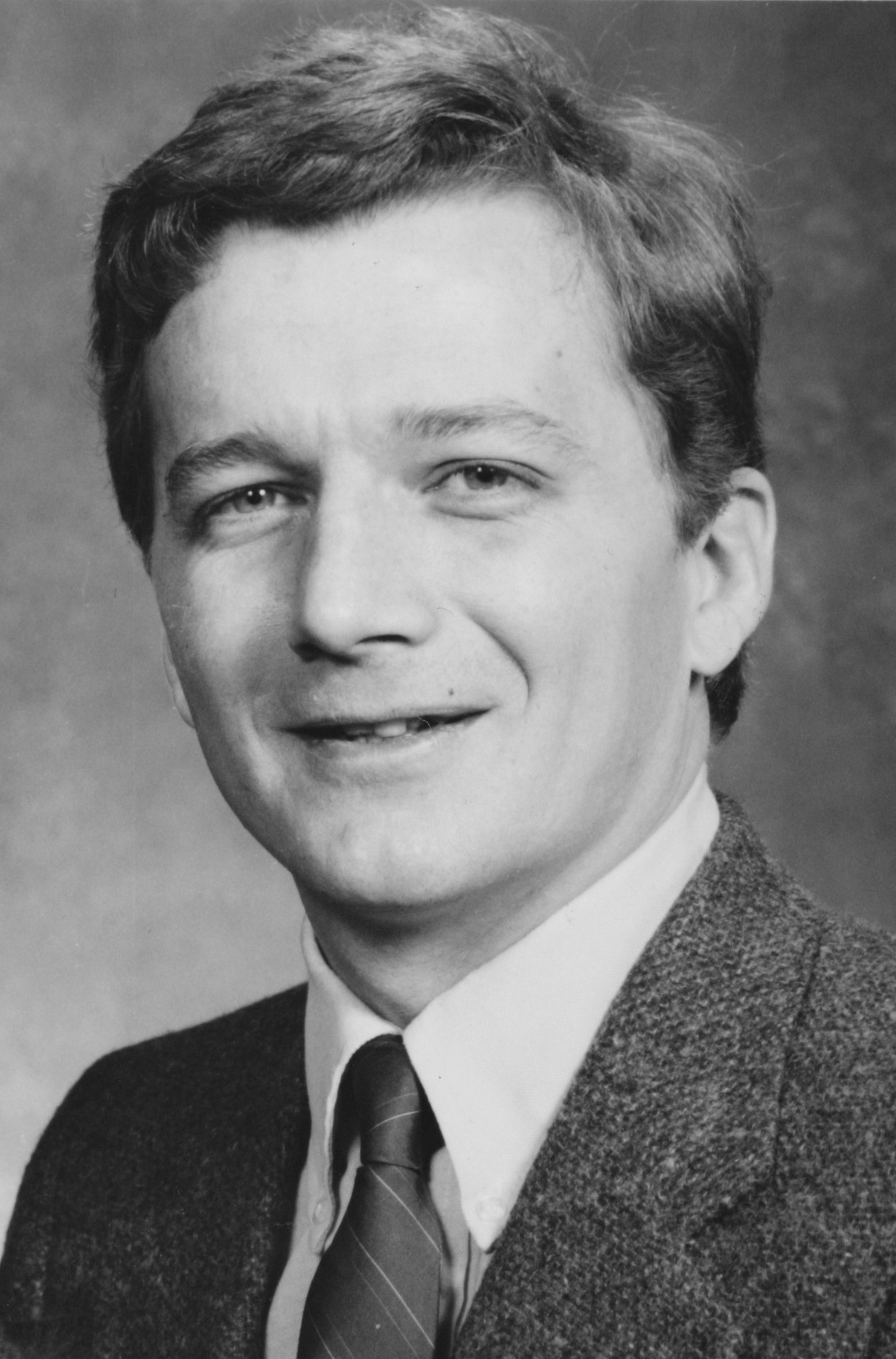
- Jochum in 1987

Member of the Iowa House of Representatives from the 36th district
- In office January 10, 1983 – January 10, 1993
- Preceded by: Marv Diemer
- Succeeded by: Pat Murphy

Member of the Iowa House of Representatives from the 19th district
- In office January 13, 1975 – January 9, 1983
- Preceded by: Joseph W. Clark
- Succeeded by: Lowell Norland

Personal details
- Born: December 25, 1951 Dubuque, Iowa, U.S.
- Died: November 9, 2020 (aged 68)
- Party: Democratic
- Spouse(s): Mary Pamela Hingtgen (div. 1985) Amy Ward (m. 1991–2020)
- Children: 5

Thomas J. Jochum (December 25, 1951 – November 9, 2020) was an American politician.

Jochum was born in Dubuque, Iowa, on December 25, 1951, to parents Alfred Jochum and Lolita Schmitt. He attended Dubuque Wahlert High School and Loras College, both Catholic educational institutions. Jochum was a member of the Sacred Heart Catholic Church in his hometown and later served as a delegate to the United States Conference of Catholic Bishops. Jochum met and married Mary Pamela Hingtgen, with whom he had a daughter, Sarah Noel Jochum (1977–2018). They divorced in 1985. In 1991, he married Amy Ward, with whom he raised four children.

Jochum worked for John Deere, and was an active member of the United Auto Workers, including a stint as editor of the Local #94 News. Before pursuing political office himself, Jochum joined the Americans for Democratic Action and supported several Iowa Democratic Party campaigns. Jochum won his first state legislative election in 1974, after the death of Joseph W. Clark, and served continuously in the Iowa House of Representatives until 1993, for District 19 until 1983, and District 36 thereafter. By his ninth and final term in office, Jochum had become executive director of Arc of the United States' Iowa branch. After he stepped down from the state legislature, Jochum's first wife Pam ran for office, and was elected. Jochum himself founded a consultancy firm and advocated for the Meskwaki Nation and the disabled.

Jochum died of cancer on November 9, 2020, at the age of 68.
