= Joseph W. Clark =

American politician (1912–1974)

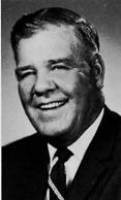
- Clark in 1973

Member of the Iowa House of Representatives from the 19th district
- In office January 8, 1973 – October 8, 1974
- Preceded by: Maynard Menefee
- Succeeded by: Thomas J. Jochum

Personal details
- Born: Joseph Warren Clark; May 5, 1912 Ottumwa, Iowa, U.S.
- Died: October 8, 1974 (aged 62) Iowa City, Iowa, U.S.
- Party: Democratic
- Spouse: Mary Louise Spurgeon (m. 1932)
- Children: 5
- Education: Ottumwa High School
- Occupation: Politician

Joseph Warren Clark (May 5, 1912 – October 8, 1974) was an American politician.

Clark was born in Ottumwa, Iowa, on May 5, 1912, to parents Wycliff Clark and Anna Burns. He dropped out of Ottumwa High School after his parents had fallen ill, but obtained his diploma after Ottumwa began offering evening classes. Clark ran the family farm, and was also a coal miner and ironworker. He was active in the Congress of Industrial Organizations, serving the Ottumwa local as its first secretary-treasurer. Clark was elected to represent District 19 of the Iowa House of Representatives in 1972 and 1974 as a Democrat. However, he died in the midst of his first term in office.

Clark died on October 8, 1974, at the University of Iowa Hospital, where he was seeking treatment for cancer.
