= Maynard Menefee =

American politician (1907–1993)

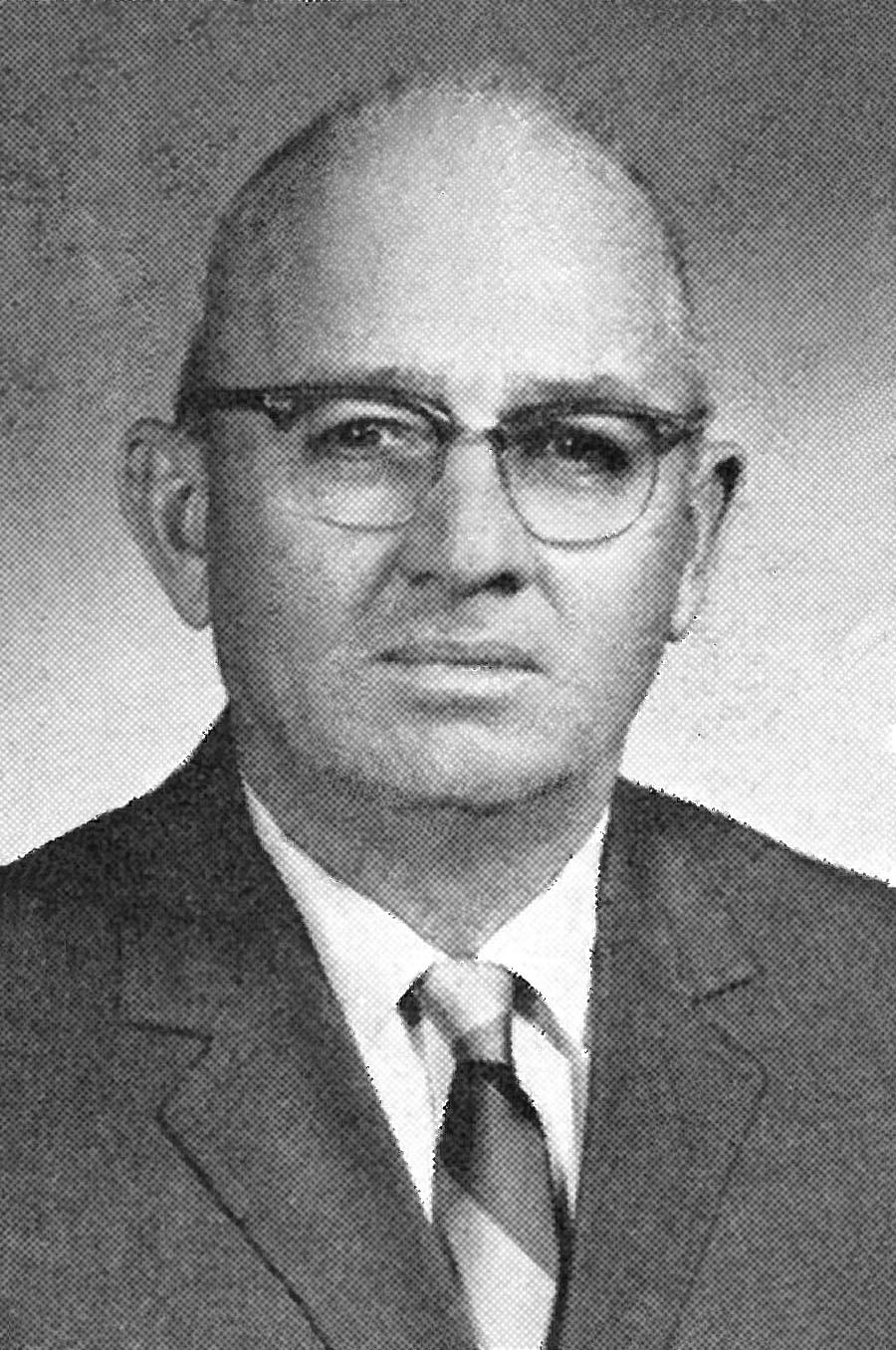

Member of the Iowa House of Representatives from the 19th district
- In office January 11, 1971 – January 7, 1973
- Preceded by: LeRoy Wilfred Chalupa
- Succeeded by: Joseph Warren Clark

Member of the Iowa House of Representatives from the 71st district
- In office January 13, 1969 – January 10, 1971
- Preceded by: Maurice E. Baringer
- Succeeded by: Richard F. Drake

Personal details
- Born: October 15, 1907 Adair, Iowa
- Died: March 8, 1993 (aged 85) Walnut Creek, California
- Party: Republican

Maynard Turner Menefee (October 15, 1907 – March 8, 1993) was an American politician who served in the Iowa House of Representatives from 1969 to 1973.

He died on March 8, 1993, in Walnut Creek, California at age 85.
