= Todd Blodgett =

American political writer (born 1960)

- Born: Todd Alan Blodgett; 10 September 1960 (age 66); Iowa City, Iowa
- Education: Drake University
- Relatives: Gary Blodgett (father)

Todd Blodgett (born September 10, 1960) is an American conservative pro-Donald Trump Republican writer, campaign strategist and sales/marketing consultant who served on President Ronald Reagan's White House Staff (1985–87) and worked for the Republican National Committee and the FBI.

His work as a full-time, paid FBI confidential Informant has been noted in articles and the Op-Ed pages of The New York Times, The Washington Post, FOX News, NBC News, USA Today, The Forward, The HuffPost, NorthIowaToday.com, CBS News, The Globe-Gazette and other newspapers owned by Lee Enterprises, Inc., Democracy Now!, RealClearPolitics, the National Legal & Policy Center, News.Com.AU (a Sydney, Australia website), The Times of Israel, The Cape Cod Times, Bleeding Heartland, The Daily KOS, Metro US, O.C. Weekly, KXAN-TV, The Des Moines Register, The Southern Poverty Law Center, newswire and numerous other periodicals and websites.

== Early life and education ==
Blodgett was born in Iowa City, Iowa, and grew up in Mason City, a northern Iowa community in Cerro Gordo county. His father, Dr. Gary B. Blodgett, was a prominent orthodontist and businessman who was highly active in Republican politics and local civics who later served in the Iowa Legislature (1992–2001) as the deputy majority leader.

Blodgett attended Mason City schools until 1975 when he began high school at Shattuck-Saint Mary’s in Faribault, Minnesota. In 1972, Blodgett met and become friends with J. Neil ‘Moon’ Reagan, whose brother was California governor and future president Ronald Reagan.

While he was a student at Shattuck-Saint Mary’s, J. Neil Reagan arranged for Blodgett to meet his famous sibling in June 1976, while Reagan sought the GOP presidential nomination. Following his 1977 expulsion from Shattuck, Blodgett returned to his hometown and graduated from Mason City high school in 1979. From 1979-83, he studied in Des Moines, Iowa at Drake University, where he was a member of the Sigma Alpha Epsilon fraternity.

== Political activities and professional career/positions ==
- Blodgett kept in contact with Ronald Reagan and between 1976 and 1980, and met with him several times whenever the candidate appeared in Iowa.
- Upon his graduation from Drake University in 1983 (B.A. in journalism), U.S. Senator Roger W. Jepsen [R-IA] hired Blodgett as his re-election campaign’s deputy finance director.
- Washington, DC: White House staff, presidential campaign, and the FBI.
- Following Jepsen’s defeat in November, 1984; Blodgett joined the Reagan-Bush Presidential Inaugural Committee staff. From 1985 to 1987, he served on the staff of Reagan’s White House Press Office and was, when hired, the youngest Reagan-Bush White House staff member.
- Lee Atwater, George H.W. Bush, Willis Carto and other associates
- Blodgett in Nov., 1987 resigned from the White House Press Office staff to work part-time for then-vice president George Bush’s PAC, while consulting for a DC direct marketing firm. In August 1988 that PAC became the Bush-Quayle ’88 Committee, with Blodgett serving as a domestic policy adviser throughout the general election campaign.

== Professional career Since 1988 ==
In December 1988, the incoming RNC chairman, Lee Atwater, a friend of and mentor to Blodgett, hired him to work in Opposition Research at the Republican National Committee (RNC). At the RNC, he specialized in ‘wedge’ issues. Blodgett was a protégé of Lee Atwater and following Atwater’s 1991 death and President Bush’s defeat, he founded a DC-based advertising agency. Concomitantly, he was co-publisher and the advertising manager of ‘SLICK TIMES’ – a monthly political parody magazine that satirized Bill and Hillary Clinton.

== Past connections to the radical far-right and later business ventures ==
The FBI became interested in Blodgett because his advertising agency’s clients included Liberty Lobby, a white nationalist, neo-Nazi organization. Blodgett in 1998 became the majority stockholder of Resistance Records, which then was the world’s largest, most profitable neo-Nazi record label. Willis Carto, who had owed sizable debts to Blodgett’s ad agency, paid them in late 1998 with shares in this corporation, which was founded in Canada circa 1993. Blodgett quickly sold his controlling shares to Dr. William L. Pierce, author of The Turner Diaries and founder of the anti-Semitic National Alliance.

== Years with the FBI and JTTF ==
The FBI recruited Blodgett in January, 2000 to work for the bureau and Joint Terrorism Task Force (JTTF) as a paid, full-time confidential informant (C.I.). From March 1, 2000 to Nov. 30, 2002, Blodgett was employed in this capacity.

During his years as an FBI informant, Blodgett monitored notable American and British far-right figures, including David Duke, William L. Pierce, Don Black, Dr. Ed Fields, Paul Hall, Jr., Rev. Richard Butler, Chris Temple, Willis Carto, Mark Cotterill, Steven Cartwright, Richard Barnbrook, John Tyndall, Nick Griffin, Michael Collins Piper, David Irving, Mark Weber, Greg Raven, Gregory Douglas, Tom Metzger, Bradley Smith, Sam Dickson, and numerous others.

His investigative efforts included attending gatherings of Holocaust deniers and white supremacist organizations which were of interest to American anti-terrorism law enforcement officials and agencies. Blodgett regularly met with FBI and JTTF agents and analysts, and other officials, to provide information he uncovered in his investigative efforts.

The FBI/JTTF assigned him to infiltrate, surveil and monitor neo-Nazis, The Ku Klux Klan, the Aryan Nations, fascist Skinheads, Holocaust deniers and other racists and professional anti-Semites and their donors, their violence-prone rank-and-file members and their clandestine supporters in the United States, the UK, Europe, Canada, and the Caribbean.

As an FBI informant, Blodgett investigated and identified money-laundering and tax evasion schemes, RICO violations, wire fraud, mail fraud and other financial crimes connected to the leaders and financial backers of several racist far right, anti-Semitic organizations.

The FBI, JTTF and IRS, acting on his findings, developed cases which were later handled by the Financial Crimes Enforcement Network (FINCEN) and U.S. Treasury Department.

== Lawsuit against the University Club of Washington, D.C. ==
Blodgett, who had been a member of the University Club of DC since 1992, hosted Dr. William L. Pierce there for lunch, in 1999. When contacted by a reporter from The Washington Post who asked about the meeting, Blodgett acknowledged he had hosted the controversial Pierce.

A subsequent article in The Washington Post angered some members, who urged its board of governors to oust Blodgett. After refusing to voluntarily resign his membership he was expelled and later sued. This noteworthy legal case, ‘Blodgett v. the University Club of D.C.’ is taught in law schools and regularly cited by judges, professors and legal journalists — as case law, pertaining to the rights of private clubs and those of their members.

== Drug addiction, recovery, and later business career ==
Prior to working for the FBI, Blodgett had developed an addiction to crack cocaine. This led to the end of his 10-year marriage in 2005 and being arrested and jailed on drug charges. In 2006, while on probation, he conquered his addiction and began working for a DC-based direct mail marketing firm, Whitehead & Associates.

Since his FBI career, Blodgett’s professional activities have largely focused on marketing, promotions and sales.

When the direct marketing company relocated to San Antonio, Texas, in 2008; Blodgett moved there along with it. When it moved to Tyler, Texas in 2014, Blodgett remained with the firm, which raised funds for a variety of political candidates and charitable organizations.

During this time Blodgett put his marketing and promotions skills to use as an independent political consultant, raising funds for several candidates for office in Iowa, of both parties – Republican and Democrat.

== Published works and current activities ==
From 2010-21, he wrote Op-Ed columns which appeared in The Des Moines Register, USA Today, the Globe-Gazette, NorthIowaToday.com, The HuffPost, RealClearPolitics and other publications and websites. His 2021 memoir, Republican Crackhead featured his drug issues, FBI work, political career, White House years and recovery from addiction.

Todd Blodgett today divides his time between in Clear Lake, Iowa and Tyler, Texas. He serves as a director of the Bertha Stebens Charitable Foundation, based in Mason City, and owns a summer home at the Outing Club, a private entity based in Clear Lake, Iowa, where his family has held membership since 1972. He is an NRA Life member, is interested in firearms and known to legally carry a gun.
