= Steven Holt =

American politician (born 1958)

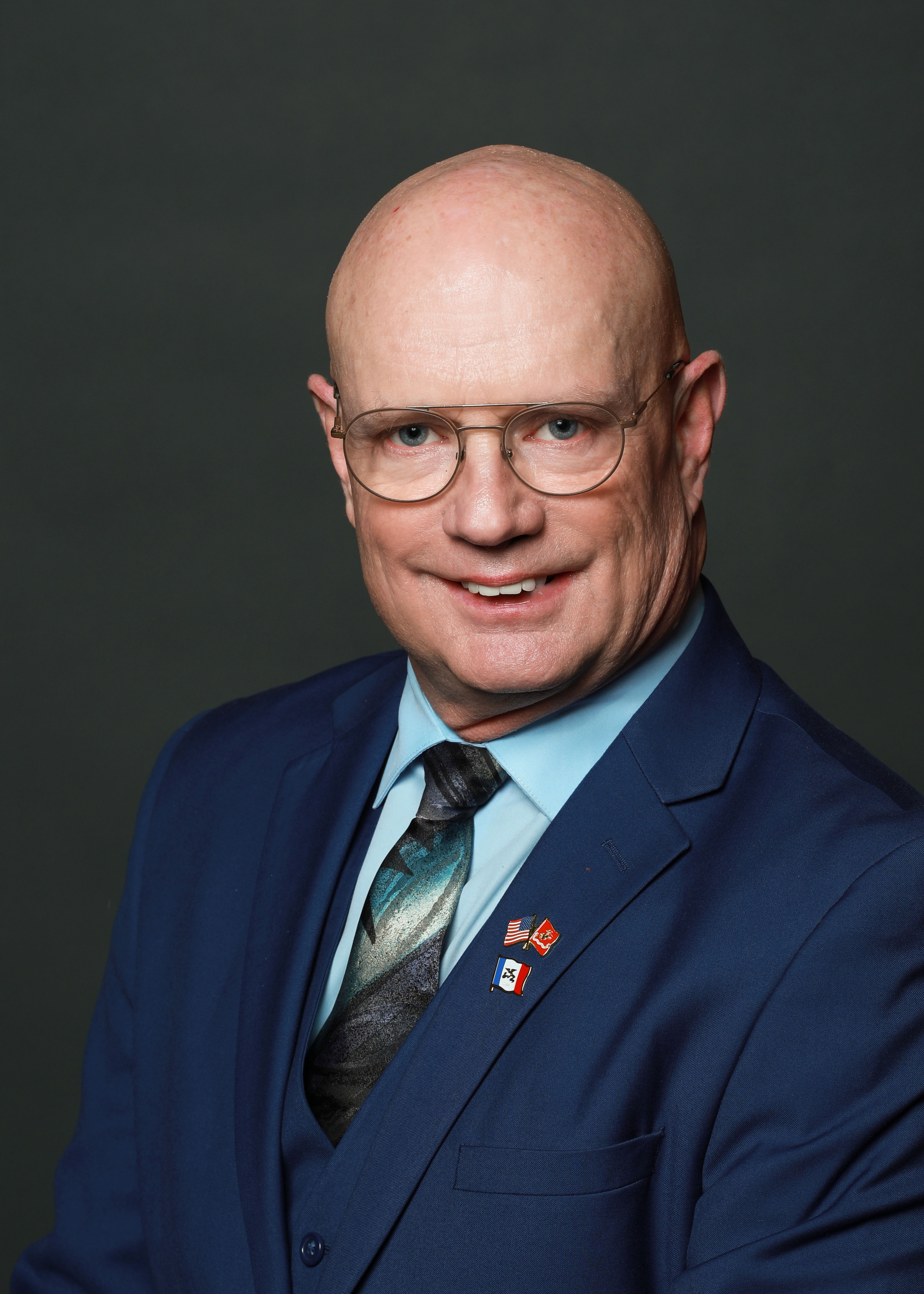
- Holt in 2021

Member of the Iowa House of Representatives from the 12th district
- Incumbent
- Assumed office January 12, 2015

Personal details
- Born: January 28, 1958 (age 68) Greenville, South Carolina, U.S.
- Party: Republican
- Spouse: Crystal
- Children: Five
- Profession: Businessman

Military service
- Branch/service: United States Marine Corps
- Rank: First sergeant

Steven Christopher Holt (born January 28, 1958) is an American politician and retired U.S. Marine Corps veteran. He has been a Republican member of the Iowa House of Representatives since 2015.

== Personal life ==
Holt was born in Greenville, South Carolina, and raised there. After graduating from Spartanburg High School, he enlisted in the U.S. Marine Corps, serving for 20 years (1976-1996) before retiring as a first sergeant. From 1996 to 1999, Holt worked in law enforcement, including roles as a deputy sheriff and police chief, though specific details of his assignments and locations remain unclear. In 2006, Holt relocated to Denison, Iowa, where he became a small business owner and married Crystal. Holt's career experience includes owning Summer Magic Tropical Snow and Movie Magic USA, an eBay store. An evangelical Christian, Holt is a member of Grace Evangelical Free Church in Denison, Iowa.

== Political Career ==
Holt was first elected to the state house in 2015, initially representing District 18 and currently representing District 12 (Crawford County and parts of Carroll and Shelby Counties) since 2023. He has chaired the House Judiciary Committee since 2019. In the 2024 election for the Iowa House of Representatives, Steven Holt (R) won with 10,269 votes (73.8%), defeating his opponent Dustin Durbin (D), who received 3,643 votes (26.2%).

=== Policy positions ===
Holt is known for his conservative policy positions, including restricting abortion access, opposing measures perceived as infringing on the Second Amendment, emphasizing reduced government regulation and oversight, supporting school choice initiatives, parental control over education, and aiming to reduce the tax burden on wealthy individuals and corporations. Holt has frequently collaborated with Representative Matt Windschitl on gun rights initiatives. Together, they have advocated for less restrictive gun laws in Iowa, including legislation to permit concealed carry without a license and to broaden the circumstances under which gun owners can use deadly force in self-defense.

=== Efforts to ban guaranteed income programs ===
Holt was instrumental in banning guaranteed income programs in Iowa. He sponsored House File 2319 (HF 2319), which aimed to end a pilot program called UpLift Iowa providing monthly cash stipends to low-income households in central Iowa. Holt argued that such programs promote dependence on government funding and do little to help people improve their job skills, calling such programs "socialism on steroids" during the legislative session. "This is a redistribution of wealth. This is an attack on American values", he said. Holt cited historical examples of Soviet farmers leaving crops to rot due to government redistribution policies, arguing that guarantee income is similar, and such programs are destructive and contrary to American values.

=== Removal of gender identity from Iowa's civil rights code ===
On February 23, 2025, Holt introduced House Study Bill 242 (HSB 242), which aimed to remove gender identity as a protected class from the Iowa Civil Rights Act. Holt argued that the inclusion of gender identity in the civil rights code elevated the rights of transgender people above those of cisgender women and girls. He stated that the bill was necessary to protect women's rights in sports and changing facilities.

The bill faced significant opposition from LGBTQ+ rights advocates and Democrats, who argued that it would lead to widespread discrimination against transgender individuals in housing, employment, and public accommodations, despite the already high levels of discrimination these communities face. Protesters gathered at the Iowa State Capitol in opposition all week, with around 2,500 individuals filling the capitol on February 27, 2025, to voice their opposition to the removal of gender identity protections from the Iowa Civil Rights Act.

Holt criticized those opposing the legislation, stating, "In spite of loud proclamations otherwise, transgender Iowans will have the same rights and protections as everyone else, as they should. But the removal of gender identity as a protected class will prevent the infringement on the rights of others, particularly women, who stand to be erased, along with decades of gains toward equality."

Despite the opposition, Iowa became the first U.S. state to remove gender identity protections from its civil rights code. The Iowa House passed the Senate bill with a vote of 60-36, the Senate voted 33-15, and it was signed into law by Governor Kim Reynolds on February 28, 2025.

=== Views on same-sex marriage and religious liberty ===
Holt supports traditional marriage and works to protect religious liberty in Iowa through legislation that allows individuals to opt-out of participating in same-sex marriage ceremonies due to their religious beliefs. He has pledged to support efforts to recognize that the Supreme Court exceeded its authority in recognizing a right to same-sex marriage, which he argues does not exist in the U.S. Constitution and violates natural law.

Holt has also strongly opposed the 2009 decision in Varnum v. Brien, which recognized the right of same-sex couples to marry in Iowa. He has pushed in previous legislative sessions for a constitutional amendment to overturn that decision, citing "judicial overreach" as a primary concern.

=== Committee assignments ===
As of January 2025, Holt serves on the following committees in the Iowa House.

- Judiciary (chair)
- Government Oversight
- Higher Education
- Public Safety
- Ways and Means

Iowa House of Representatives
Preceded by Brian Best	12th District; 2023 – present	Succeeded by Incumbent
Preceded by	18th District; 2015 – 2023	Succeeded by Tom Moore
