= Thomas Gerhold =

American politician (born 1961)

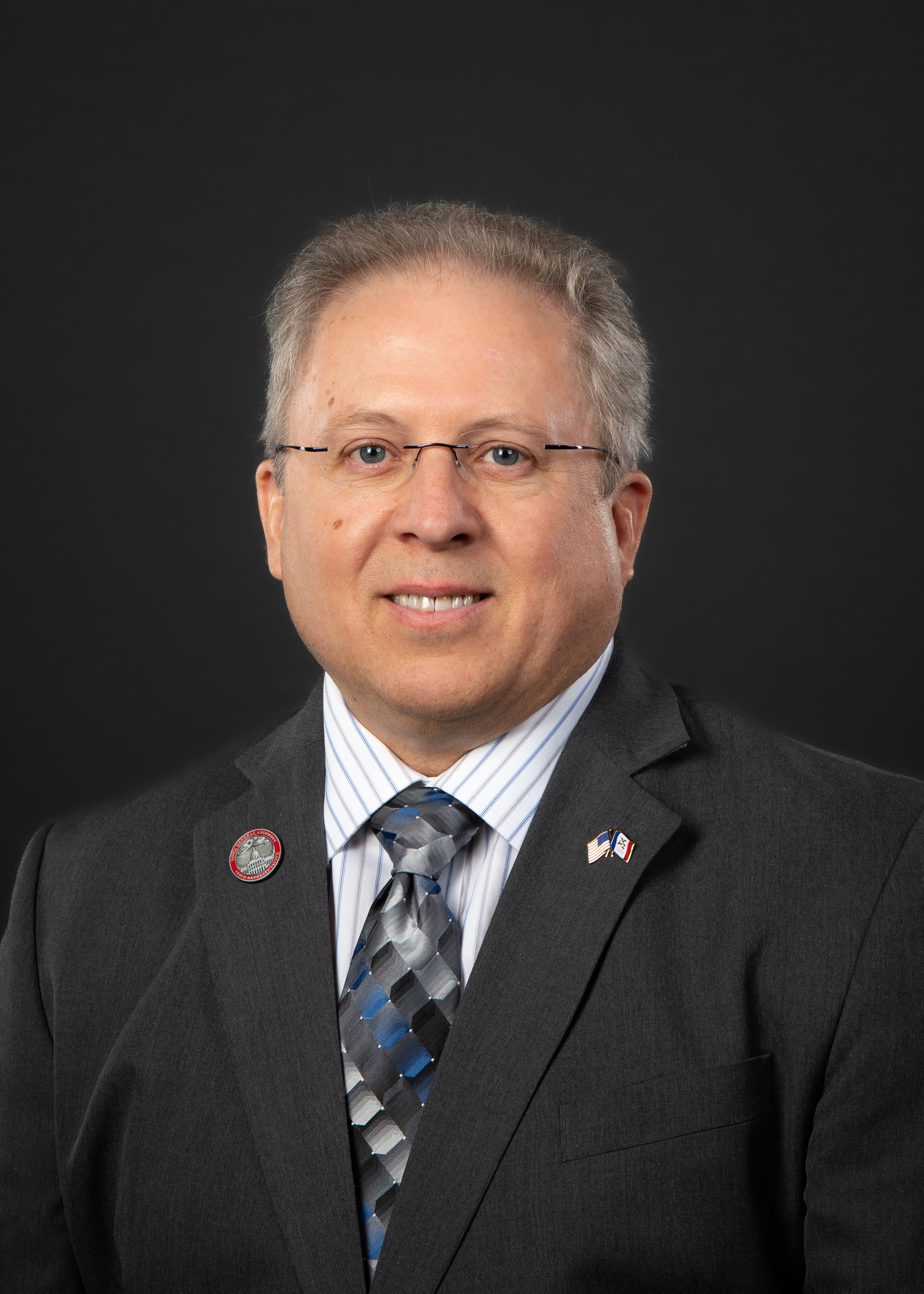

Member of the Iowa House of Representatives from the 84th district
- Incumbent
- Assumed office 2019

Personal details
- Born: 1961 (age 64–65) Cedar Rapids, Iowa, U.S.
- Party: Republican
- Education: University of Iowa
- Profession: Research Associate

Thomas Gerhold (born 21 June 1961) is an American politician. A member of the Republican Party, he was elected to the Iowa House of Representatives for the first time in 2018, from District 84.

== Early life, education, and career ==
Gerhold was born on 21 June 1961. He was raised near Atkins, Iowa, where his family owned a farm. Gerhold attended Benton Community High School, and enrolled at Kirkwood Community College and later the University of Iowa. He then worked as a research associate within the Department of Internal Medicine at the University of Iowa Carver College of Medicine.

== Political career ==
Gerhold began his campaign in February 2018, ran unopposed in the Republican Party primary, and subsequently won the November 2018 general elections to succeed the retiring Dawn Pettengill of District 75, defeating Democratic Party candidate Paula Denison, and Libertarian Party candidate John George. After redistricting, Gerhold was elected to District 84 in 2022 and reelected in 2024. Gerhold is vice chair of the Environmental Protection Committee and is a member of the Agriculture, Labor & Workforce, and Veterans Affairs committees.

Iowa House of Representatives
Preceded by Joe Mitchell	84th District; 2023-Present	Succeeded by Incumbent
Preceded by	75th District; 2019 – 2023	Succeeded by Bob Kressig
