= A. J. Spiker =

AJ Spiker
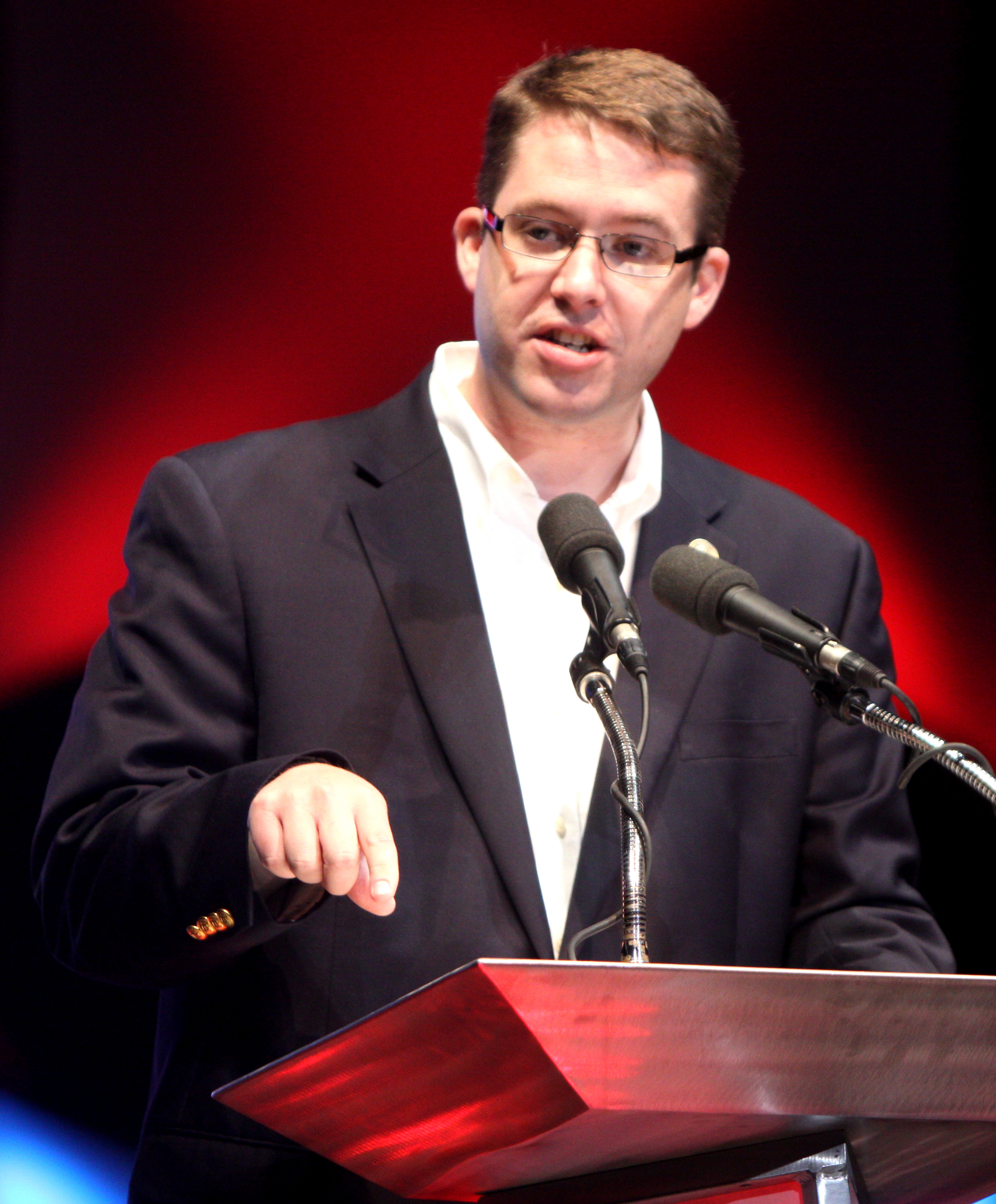

Chairman of the Republican Party of Iowa
- In office February 11, 2012 – March 29, 2014
- Preceded by: Matt Strawn
- Succeeded by: Danny Carroll

Personal details
- Born: July 10, 1979 (age 45)
- Political party: Republican

A. J. Spiker serves as an adviser to RandPAC and is a former state chairman of the Republican Party of Iowa (RPI). As state chairman, he served as a member of the Republican National Committee (RNC).

Spiker was nominated to be chairman of the RPI in 2012 by then RNC committeewoman Kim Lehman, he was elected with 53% of the vote. In 2013 Spiker easily won reelection with 72% of the vote, he was nominated by RNC committeeman Steve Scheffler. In September 2013, the Polk County Republican Central Committee, the largest county Republican party, passed a motion of no confidence in Spiker's leadership. Spiker's leadership in 2012 helped turn out over 20,000 more Republicans than Democrats during the statewide general election and he increased the number of absentee voters to the highest in state party history. Spiker works as a real estate agent.

Prior to becoming the RPI chairman, Spiker served as one of the 17 members of its state central committee. He also is the past chairman, co-chairman and treasurer of the Story County Republican Party. In 2011 Spiker served as a state vice-chairman for presidential candidate Ron Paul's 2012 campaign for President of the United States, whom he also endorsed upon Paul's entrance in the race. During the 2012 election cycle, Spiker advocated removing Iowa Supreme Court justice David Wiggins from the bench due to the court's unanimous ruling in favor of gay marriage. During the 2013 legislative session, Spiker actively engaged in and defeated legislation that would increase Iowa's gas tax.

== See also ==
- Republican Party of Iowa

Party political offices
Preceded by Matt Strawn	Chairman of the Republican Party of Iowa; 2012 – 2014	Succeeded by Danny Carroll
