= Amber Fiser =

American softball player

Personal information
- Nationality: American
- Born: February 6, 1998 (age 28)
- Height: 5 ft 6 in (1.68 m)

Sport
- Country: USA
- Sport: Softball
- College team: Minnesota Golden Gophers
- League: AUSL
- Team: Chicago Bandits

Amber Kay Fiser (born February 6, 1998) is an American professional softball pitcher for the Chicago Bandits. She played college softball at Minnesota.

== Career ==
Fiser attended Benton Community High School. She later attended the University of Minnesota, where she was a starting pitcher for the Minnesota Golden Gophers softball team in the Big Ten Conference. She is a two-time first team conference honoree and was named Big Ten Pitcher of the Year in 2019. Fiser led Minnesota softball to their first ever berth in the 2019 Women's College World Series, where they lost to Washington, 5–3. She redshirted her senior year in 2020 due to the cancellation of the season and the COVID-19 pandemic and returned to play in 2021 to complete her eligibility. Fiser was drafted No. 5 overall in the Athletes Unlimited Softball draft.

== Career statistics ==
Minnesota Golden Gophers
YEAR	W	L	GP	GS	CG	SHO	SV	IP	H	R	ER	BB	SO	ERA	WHIP
2017	14	0	23	18	5	2	0	87.2	66	29	21	34	83	1.68	1.14
2018	27	10	46	43	25	9	2	244.1	173	72	59	63	237	1.69	0.96
2019	31	9	46	40	25	10	3	259.2	163	64	47	74	346	1.27	0.91
2020	10	7	21	15	8	3	1	100.0	68	41	31	36	145	2.17	1.04
2021	16	8	29	15	15	3	0	161.2	130	67	45	44	138	1.95	1.08
TOTALS	98	34	165	131	78	27	6	853.1	600	273	203	251	949	1.66	0.99
