= Brad Strawn =

American psychologist and theologian

Brad D. Strawn is an American psychologist and theologian, currently the Evelyn and Frank Freed Professor of the Integration of Psychology and Theology at Fuller Theological Seminary.
