= Larry Kirkenslager =

American politician (born 1944)

Larry K. Kirkenslager

Member of the Iowa House of Representatives from the 84th district
- In office January 8, 1979 – January 4, 1982
- Preceded by: William Monroe
- Succeeded by: Elaine Baxter

Personal details
- Born: August 6, 1944 (age 81) Burlington, Iowa
- Party: Republican

Larry K. Kirkenslager (born August 6, 1944) is an American politician who served in the Iowa House of Representatives from the 84th district from 1979 to 1982.
