= Hawkins Menefee =

American politician

Member of the Texas House of Representatives from the 84th district
- In office January 9, 1973 – March 13, 1974
- Succeeded by: Herman E. Lauhoff

Personal details
- Born: February 9, 1945 Washington, D.C., U.S.
- Died: March 13, 1974 (aged 29)
- Party: Democratic
- Education: Austin College; University of Texas

Hawkins Menefee (February 9, 1945 – March 13, 1974) was an American politician. He served as a Democratic member for the 84th district of the Texas House of Representatives.

== Life and career ==
Menefee was born in Washington, D.C. He attended Hillcrest High School, Austin College and the University of Texas.

Menefee served in the Texas House of Representatives from 1973 to 1974.

Menefee died on March 13, 1974, in an automobile accident, at the age of 29.
