= LeRoy Wilfred Chalupa =

American politician (1912–1965)

Member of the Iowa House of Representatives from the 19th district
- In office January 10, 1955 – January 10, 1965

Personal details
- Born: December 13, 1912 Pleasant Plain, Iowa, U.S.
- Died: November 1, 1965 (aged 52) Iowa City, Iowa, U.S.
- Party: Republican
- Spouse: Dora Anderson (m. 1935)
- Children: 3
- Education: Parsons College
- Occupation: Politician, farmer

Military service
- Allegiance: United States
- Branch/service: United States Army
- Battles/wars: World War II

LeRoy Wilfred Chalupa (December 13, 1912 – November 1, 1965) was an American politician.

LeRoy Wilfred Chalupa was born to parents Frank Chalupa and Katharine Hoefert on December 13, 1912, and raised on the family farm in Pleasant Plain, Iowa, alongside two siblings. He attended Parsons College and married Dora Anderson in 1935. The couple had one son and two daughters. Chalupa was a farmer who owned a hardware store and feed manufacturing plant. After the United States entered into World War II, he served two years in the Third United States Army. When the war ended, Chalupa became a carpenter in Los Angeles before returning to Iowa in 1947.

A Republican, Chalupa was mayor and city councilor in his hometown before being elected to five consecutive terms on the Iowa House of Representatives. As a state legislator, he served from 1955 to 1965, all for House District 19. Chalupa was defeated in the 1964 election cycle, and died on November 1, 1965, at the Veterans' Hospital in Iowa City.
