= 2024 Iowa elections =

Elections in Iowa, United States

The 2024 Iowa elections were held on November 5, 2024. Voters cast their ballots for the President of the United States, all four of Iowa’s U.S. House of Representatives seats, and all seats in the Iowa General Assembly.

== Federal offices ==
2024 Iowa presidential election results by county.

=== President ===
Republican nominee Donald Trump won Iowa with 55.7% of the vote, defeating Democratic nominee Kamala Harris, who received 42.5%. As a result, all 6 of Iowa's electoral college votes went to Trump.

Other candidates on the ballot included Robert F. Kennedy Jr. and Chase Oliver; they received 0.8% and 0.4% of the vote, respectively.

=== United States House of Representatives ===
All four of Iowa’s congressional districts were contested, and the delegation remained four Republicans.

== State elections ==
=== Iowa General Assembly ===
Elections were held for all 100 seats in the Iowa House of Representatives and for 25 of the 50 seats in the Iowa Senate.

=== Ballot measures ===
In 2024, Iowans voted two state-wide ballot measures, both of which were constitutional amendments.

Amendment 1 proposed to repeal an existing provision stating that every citizen can vote, amending it to specify that only citizens of the United States can vote in elections. It also proposed that 17-year-olds who will be 18 by the time of the general election are eligible to vote in primary elections. While this is already allowed in Iowa, this amendment would add this practice into the state constitution.

Amendment 1 Results
Choice	Votes	%
For	1,150,332	77.1%
Against	341,034	22.9%
Total	1,491,366	100%

Amendment 2 sought to clarify the gubernatorial line of succession, proposing that, if the governor dies, resigns, or is removed from office, the lieutenant governor would assume the office of governor for the remainder of the term. It also specified that, in such cases, the newly vacant lieutenant governor's office could be filled through an appointment by the new governor.

Amendment 2 Results
Choice	Votes	%
For	1,190,003	81.0%
Against	278,282	19.0%
Total	1,468,285	100%
