= Luvern Kehe =

American politician (1909–1995)

Luvern William Kehe (2 December 1909 – 28 July 1995) was an American engineer and politician.

== Biography ==
Kehe was born in Waterloo, Iowa, on 2 December 1909, to parents Henry W. and Louisa Steege Kehe. The family moved to Waverly, where he graduated from Waverly High School 1926. After completing a bachelor's of science degree in civil engineering at the University of Iowa, Kehe became a surveyor and was later a civilian engineer for the United States Army Corps of Engineers. Originally assigned to Washington, D.C. at the start of World War II, Kehe worked successively on the Canol Project and Manhattan Project, then retired from active duty with the rank of colonel and returned to Waverly, where he founded the Kehe Construction Company and Cedar Valley Engineering Company.

Kehe served as chairman of the Bremer County Republican Party. He was elected on the Republican ticket to the Iowa House of Representatives for the first time in 1968, and reelected in 1970. He served as the legislator for District 12. During his tenure as a state representative, Kehe was interested in environmental legislation, and served as head of the Environmental Preservation Committee. During his first term, he voted against a bill eliminating a bond to file cases regarding housing discrimination. In his second term, Kehe researched the offering of a tax credit to veterans of the Vietnam War.

Kehe married Dorothy Stoneburner in 1937. The couple raised two sons. After Stoneburner died in 1978, Kehe remarried in 1980, to Anna M. Bauman, who had four children from a previous relationship. Kehe died on 28 July 1995, after having been admitted to the Waverly Municipal Hospital four days prior.
