= Josephine Gruhn =

American politician

Member of the Iowa House of Representatives from the 12th district
- In office January 10, 1983 – January 10, 1993
- Preceded by: Lowell Norland
- Succeeded by: Donald Gries

Personal details
- Born: Kathleen Josephine Gruhn; April 14, 1927 Britt, Iowa
- Died: April 4, 2015 (aged 87) Spirit Lake, Iowa
- Party: Democratic

Josephine Gruhn (April 14, 1927 – April 4, 2015) was an American politician who served in the Iowa House of Representatives from the 12th district from 1983 to 1993.

She died on April 4, 2015, in Spirit Lake, Iowa at age 87.
