= Matt Strawn =

American businessman (born 1973)

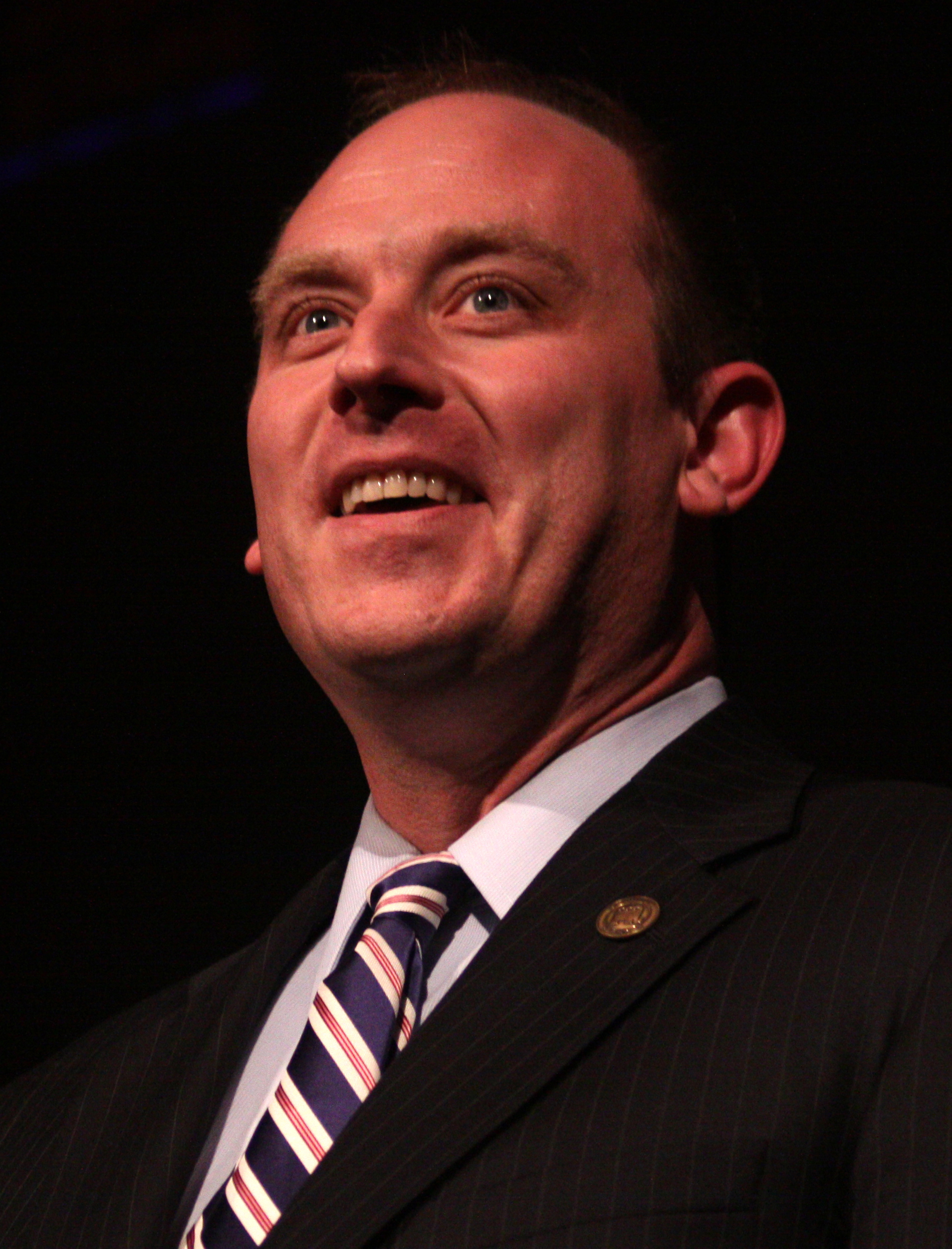

Chairman of the Republican Party of Iowa
- In office January 2009 – February 11, 2012
- Preceded by: Stewart Iverson
- Succeeded by: A. J. Spiker

Personal details
- Born: 1973 (age 52–53)
- Party: Republican
- Education: University of Iowa; Catholic University of America

Matthew "Matt" Nathan Strawn (born 1974) is an American businessman from Ankeny, Iowa.

== Early life ==
Matt Strawn is from Van Horne in Benton County, Iowa, where his family were farmers.

From 1992 to 1996, he attended the University of Iowa and graduated in 1996 with a BA majoring in political science, journalism and mass communication.

From 1999 to 2003, he attended the Columbus School of Law at the Catholic University of America, received his JD in 2003, and became a member of the Maryland Bar Association in 2004.

== Career ==
He served on the staffs of Saxby Chambliss from 1997 to January 2001 and Mike Rogers from January 2001 to June 2007.

During the 2008 presidential election, he supported John McCain's campaign.

=== Iowa Barnstormers ===
In early 2008, Strawn through The Strawn Company, Jeff Lamberti, and others became co-owners of the Iowa Barnstormers in the af2. The owners purchased the team from Iowa Pro Football L.P., which was led by Jim Foster, for $500,000. From the 2010 to the 2014 seasons, the Barnstormers played in the Arena Football League and has been in the Indoor Football League for the 2015 season to present. (Note: The Strawn Company, which Matt Strawn is president, also owns interests in a communications company and an eastern Iowa family farm.)

=== Iowa Republican Party chairman ===
In January 2009, Strawn was elected state chairman of the Republican Party of Iowa. Under the direction of Republican Governor Terry Branstad, Strawn ran for reelection unopposed in 2011, for another two-year term. Following the 2012 Iowa Republican presidential caucuses held on 3 January 2012, Strawn resigned in February 2012.

=== Next Generation Public Affairs ===
In June 2013, he co-founded the Chicago based Next Generation Public Affairs with Pat Brady and businessman Bob Fitzsimmons and remained with the firm until December 2018. (Note: Matt Strawn and Pat Brady had served together on the Republican National Committee.)

=== CEO Iowa Lottery ===
In January 2019, Strawn became a member of the Iowa Lottery board as the third Iowa Lottery CEO in the 34 years of the Iowa Lottery.

== Personal ==
As of 20 May 2019, he is married to the lobbyist Erin Coyle Strawn who is with the Stanton Park Group LLC and the Coyle Real Estate Company, and they have three children ages 8, 12, and 14. Formerly, they lived in Ankeny, Iowa, and as of February 2019, Strawn and his family live in downtown Des Moines's East Village. In February 2023 he was diagnosed with colon cancer, but is expected to make a full recovery.

== Notes ==
Party political offices
Preceded by Stewart Iverson	Chairman of the Republican Party of Iowa; 2009–2012	Succeeded by A. J. Spiker
