= Gary Blodgett =

American politician (1937–2021)

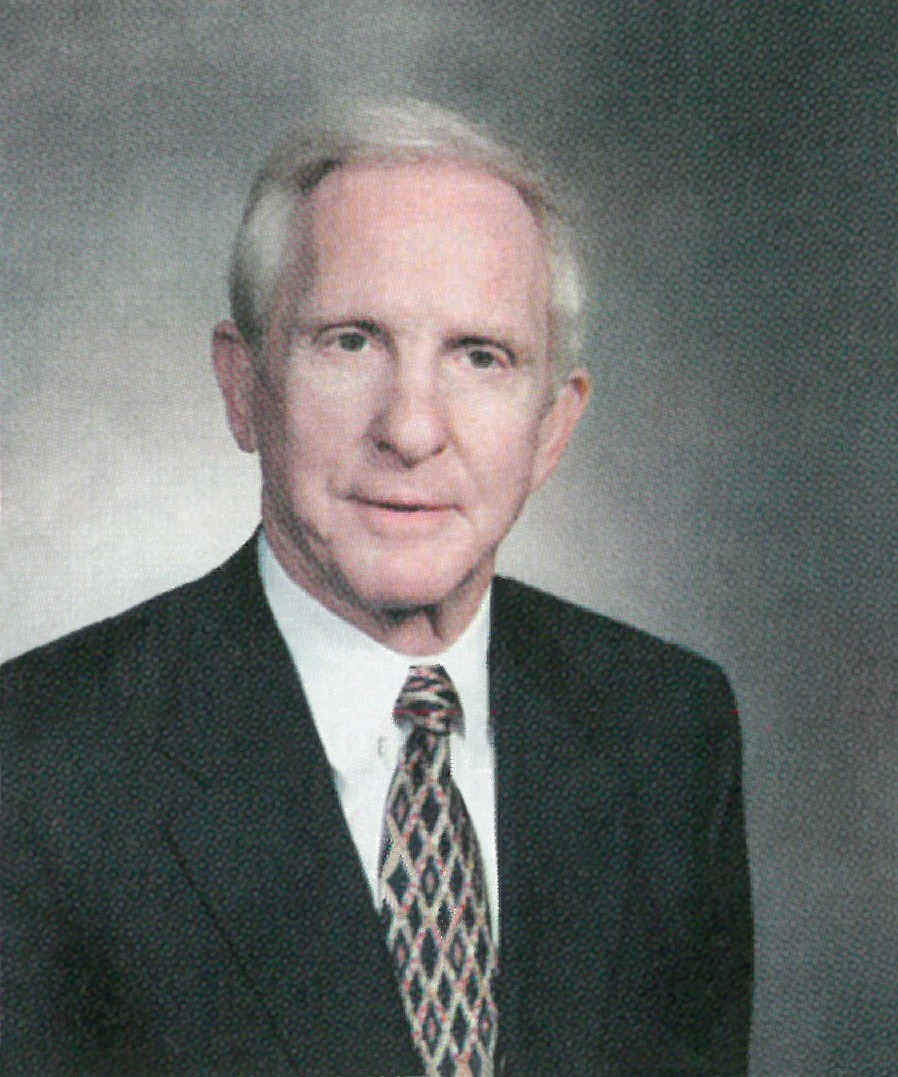

Administrative Law Judge at U.S. Department of Health and Human Services
- In office 2001–2008

Member of the Iowa House of Representatives from the 19th district
- In office January 11, 1993 – January 7, 2001
- Preceded by: Merlin Bartz
- Succeeded by: Roger Broers

Personal details
- Born: October 17, 1937 Pleasantville, Iowa, U.S.
- Died: May 19, 2021 (aged 83) Mason City, Iowa, U.S.
- Party: Republican
- Spouse: Sandra J. Hodgson
- Children: 3, including Todd
- Education: University of Iowa
- Occupation: Orthodontist

Gary B. Blodgett (October 17, 1937 – May 19, 2021) was an American politician in the state of Iowa.

Blodgett was born in Pleasantville, Iowa, and attended the University of Iowa. He was elected in 1992 to represent Cerro Gordo county in the Iowa House of Representatives, where he served as Deputy Majority Leader from 1993 to 2001 (19th district).

He represented Iowa's 19th district, serving as Chairman of the Ways & Means Committee and on the Rules, Transportation and Human Resources Committees.

Blodgett served in the U.S. Public Health Service from 1962 to 1965, and practiced orthodontistry in Mason City, Iowa, from 1967 to 1992. He was a former President of the Iowa Society of Orthodontists, in office from 1970 to 1972. While practicing orthodontics, Dr. Blodgett chaired membership drives and fundraising campaigns for the YMCA, the United Way, the March of Dimes and numerous other charities in Cerro Gordo county.

Beginning in 1976, when he raised money for then-President Gerald Ford's campaign, Blodgett had been a leading Iowa Republican fundraiser. In his first race as a candidate, he outspent his Democratic opponent by a nearly 30-to-one margin. In 1956, Blodgett married Sandra 'Sandy' J. Hodgson and had three children with her. One of his sons is conservative political writer Todd Blodgett, who served on the White House staff during the Reagan-Bush years and later worked for the FBI. In 2001, President George W. Bush appointed Blodgett to the position of Administrative Law Judge with the U.S. Department of Health & Human Services. In this position, Judge Blodgett adjudicated legal cases involving Medicare and Medicaid, hospital corporations, HMOs, and pharmaceutical providers until 2008 in Washington, D.C. Blodgett was an advisor to every Republican President from Gerald R. Ford to George W. Bush. In Oct., 2007, he was named the 'Distinguished Alumnus of the Year' by the University of Iowa.

He died of Alzheimer's disease on May 19, 2021, in Mason City, Iowa, at age 83.
