= Eric Palmer (politician) =

American politician

Eric J. Palmer
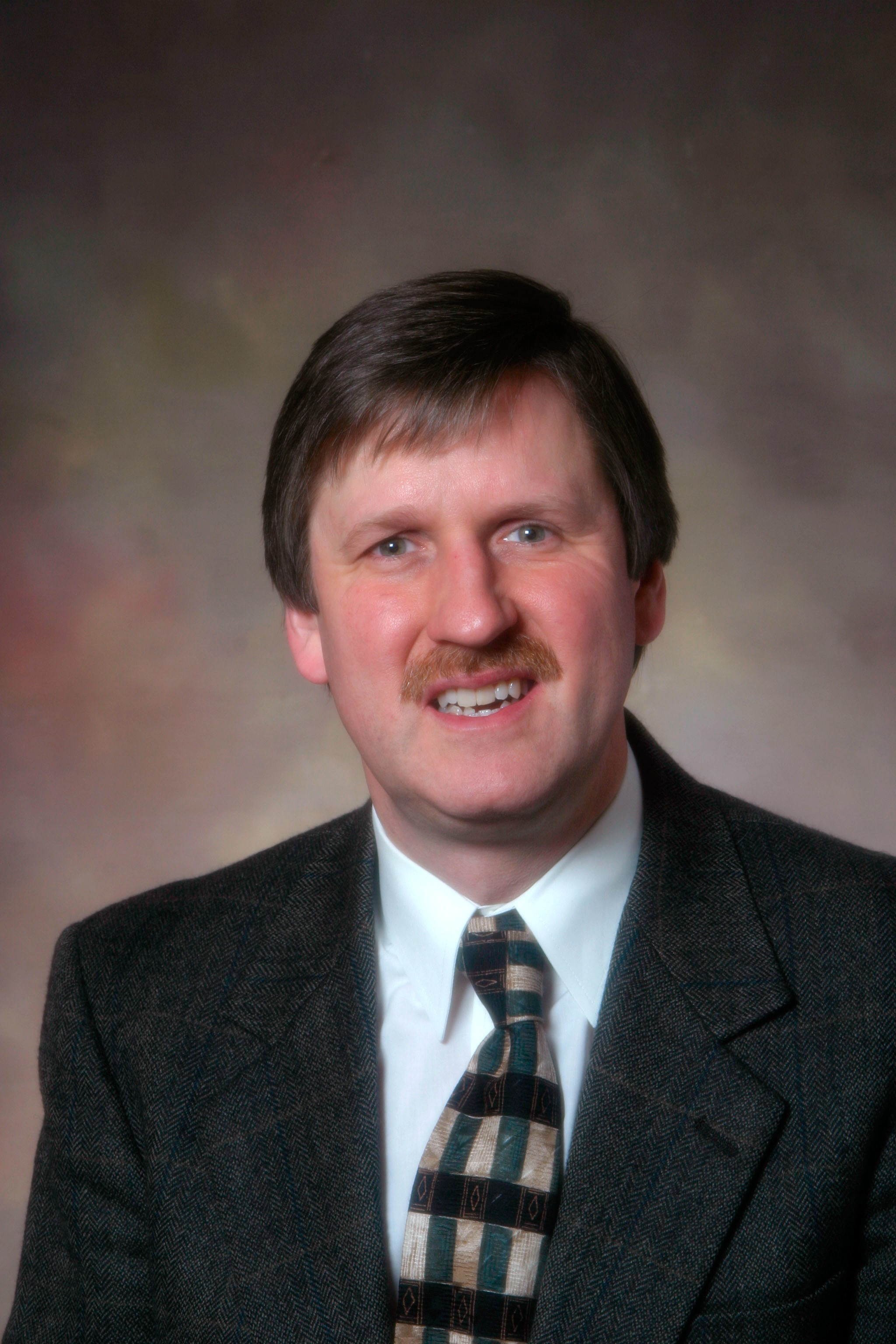

Member of the Iowa House of Representatives from the 75th district
- In office January 8, 2007 – January 9, 2011
- Preceded by: Danny Carroll
- Succeeded by: Guy Vander Linden

Personal details
- Born: 1960 (age 65–66) Oskaloosa, Iowa
- Party: Democrat
- Occupation: Attorney
- Website: Palmer's website

Eric J. Palmer (born 1960) is a former Iowa State Representative from the 75th District. A Democrat, he served in the Iowa House of Representatives from 2007 to 2011.

During his last term in the Iowa House, Palmer served on the Education, Ethics, Government Oversight (Joint), and Natural Resources committees. He also served as vice chair of the Judiciary Committee and of the Justice Systems Appropriations Subcommittee and as a member of the Healthy and Well Kids in Iowa (HAWK-I) Board.

Palmer ran for the Iowa House in 2004, losing to incumbent Republican Danny Carroll, the Speaker pro tempore. In 2006, Palmer defeated Carroll in a rematch and began his term in the House. He defeated Carroll again in 2008, but lost to Republican opponent Guy Vander Linden in 2010.

== Electoral history ==
*incumbent

| Election | Political result | Candidate | Party | Votes | % |
|---|---|---|---|---|---|
| Iowa House of Representatives elections, 2004; District 75; Turnout: 14,423 | Republican hold | Danny C. Carroll* | Republican | 7,365 | 51.1 |
| Iowa House of Representatives elections, 2004; District 75; Turnout: 14,423 | Republican hold | Eric J. Palmer | Democratic | 7,051 | 48.9 |
| Iowa House of Representatives elections, 2006; District 75; Turnout: 10,869 | Democratic gain from Republican | Eric J. Palmer | Democratic | 5,728 | 52.7 |
| Iowa House of Representatives elections, 2006; District 75; Turnout: 10,869 | Democratic gain from Republican | Danny C. Carroll* | Republican | 5,037 | 46.3 |
| Iowa House of Representatives elections, 2008; District 75; Turnout: 14,993 | Democratic hold | Eric J. Palmer* | Democratic | 8,115 | 54.1 |
| Iowa House of Representatives elections, 2008; District 75; Turnout: 14,993 | Democratic hold | Danny Carroll | Republican | 6,867 | 45.8 |
| Iowa House of Representatives elections, 2010; District 75; Turnout: 11,498 | Republican gain from Democratic | Guy Vander Linden | Republican | 6,015 | 52.3 |
| Iowa House of Representatives elections, 2010; District 75; Turnout: 11,498 | Republican gain from Democratic | Eric J. Palmer* | Democratic | 5,324 | 46.3 |

Iowa House of Representatives
| Preceded by Danny Carroll (Iowa politician) | 75th District; 2007 – 2011 | Succeeded by Guy Vander Linden |
