= Janet Metcalf =

American politician (1935–2025)

Member of the Iowa House of Representatives
- In office January 14, 1985 – January 12, 2003

Personal details
- Born: December 21, 1935 Des Moines, Iowa, U.S.
- Died: March 11, 2025 (aged 89) West Des Moines, Iowa, U.S.
- Party: Republican
- Spouse: Donald B. Metcalf
- Children: 2
- Education: Grinnell College; Iowa State University

Janet S. Metcalf (née De Puydt; December 21, 1935 – March 11, 2025) was an American politician in the state of Iowa.

== Life and career ==
Metcalf was born in Des Moines, Iowa. A Republican, she served in the Iowa House of Representatives from 1985 to 2003 (83d district from 1987 to 1993 and 75th district from 1993 to 2003).

Metcalf died on March 11, 2025, at the age of 89.
