= Ervin Dennis =

American politician (born 1936)

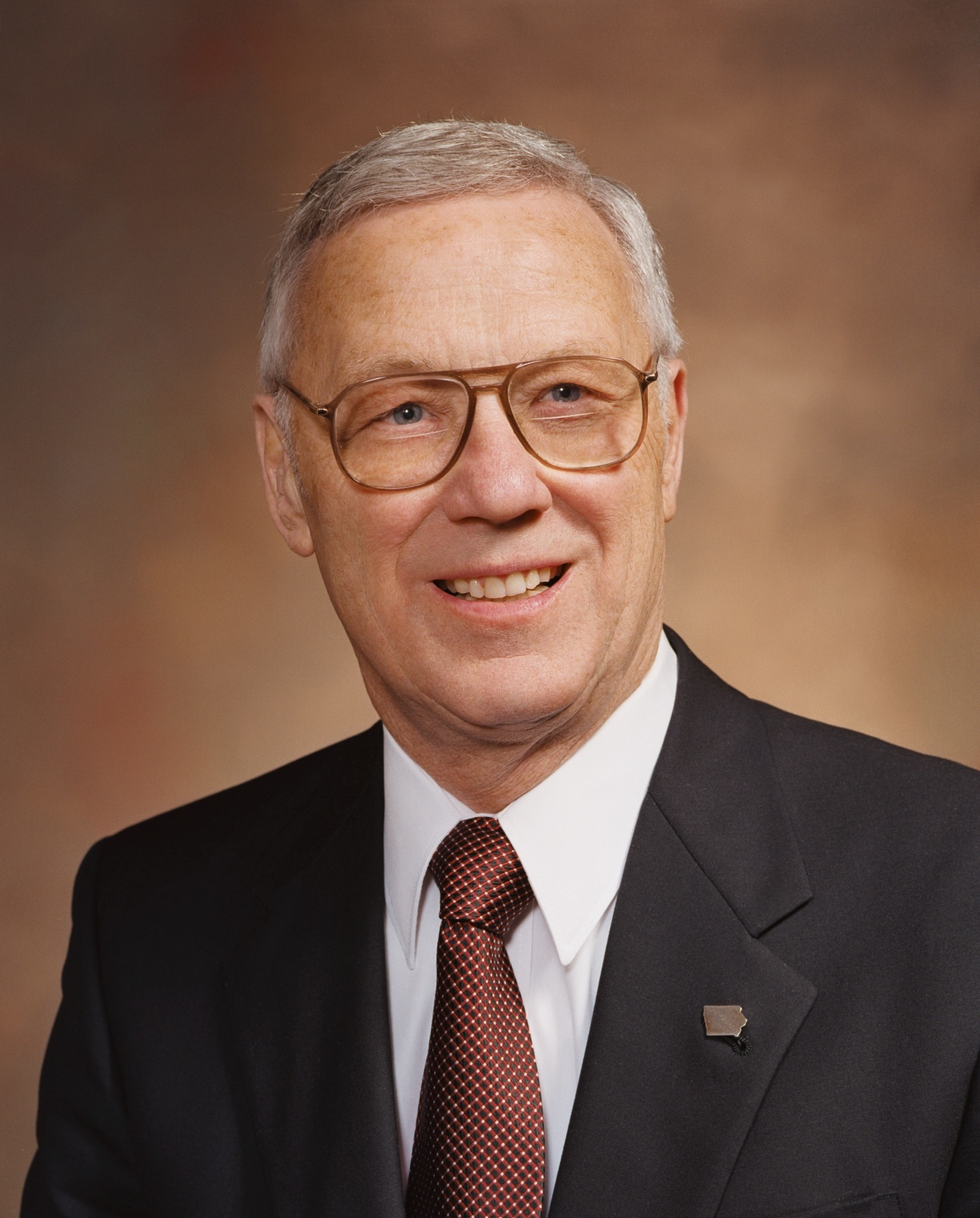

Member of the Iowa House of Representatives
- In office January 13, 2003 – January 9, 2005

Personal details
- Born: October 6, 1936 (age 89) Lyons, Nebraska, United States
- Party: Republican
- Spouse: LaVanda
- Children: three
- Occupation: academic

Ervin A. Dennis (born October 6, 1936) is an American politician in the state of Iowa.

Dennis was born in Lyons, Nebraska. He attended Northeast Community College, the University of Northern Colorado, and Texas A&M University and was an academic, and former professor at the University of Northern Iowa. A Republican, he served in the Iowa House of Representatives from 2003 to 2005 (19th district).
