= Van Horne, Iowa =

- City
- Location of Van Horne, Iowa
- Coordinates: 42°0′32″N 92°5′20″W
- Country: United States
- State: Iowa
- County: Benton

Area
  - Total: 0.93 sq mi (2.41 km^{2})
  - Land: 0.93 sq mi (2.41 km^{2})
  - Water: 0 sq mi (0.00 km^{2})
- Elevation: 945 ft (288 m)

Population (2020)
  - Total: 774
  - Density: 832.2/sq mi (321.31/km^{2})
- Time zone: UTC-6 (Central (CST))
  - Summer (DST): UTC-5 (CDT)
- ZIP code: 52346
- Area code: 319
- FIPS code: 19-80400
- GNIS feature ID: 0462533
- Website: www.vanhorne-ia.com

Van Horne is a city in Benton County, Iowa, United States. The population was 774 at the 2020 census. It is part of the Cedar Rapids Metropolitan Statistical Area.

== History ==
It was named for William Cornelius Van Horne, a railroad official.

== Geography ==
According to the United States Census Bureau, the city has a total area of 0.63 square miles (1.63 km^{2}), all land.

== Demographics ==
Historical populations
Year	Pop.	±%
1890	501	—
1900	484	−3.4%
1910	444	−8.3%
1920	524	+18.0%
1930	527	+0.6%
1940	551	+4.6%
1950	511	−7.3%
1960	554	+8.4%
1970	613	+10.6%
1980	682	+11.3%
1990	695	+1.9%
2000	716	+3.0%
2010	682	−4.7%
2020	774	+13.5%
Source:"U.S. Census website". United States Census Bureau. and Iowa Data Center; Source: U.S. Decennial Census

=== 2020 census ===
As of the census of 2020, there were 774 people, 320 households, and 232 families residing in the city. The population density was 832.2 inhabitants per square mile (321.3/km^{2}). There were 335 housing units at an average density of 360.2 per square mile (139.1/km^{2}). The racial makeup of the city was 94.7% White, 1.2% Black or African American, 0.0% Native American, 0.1% Asian, 0.0% Pacific Islander, 0.6% from other races and 3.4% from two or more races. Hispanic or Latino persons of any race comprised 1.9% of the population.

Of the 320 households, 35.3% of which had children under the age of 18 living with them, 53.4% were married couples living together, 7.2% were cohabitating couples, 20.9% had a female householder with no spouse or partner present and 18.4% had a male householder with no spouse or partner present. 27.5% of all households were non-families. 24.1% of all households were made up of individuals, 8.8% had someone living alone who was 65 years old or older.

The median age in the city was 38.5 years. 26.7% of the residents were under the age of 20; 4.9% were between the ages of 20 and 24; 29.1% were from 25 and 44; 22.6% were from 45 and 64; and 16.7% were 65 years of age or older. The gender makeup of the city was 47.7% male and 52.3% female.

=== 2010 census ===
As of the census of 2010, there were 682 people, 297 households, and 198 families living in the city. The population density was 1,082.5 inhabitants per square mile (418.0/km^{2}). There were 322 housing units at an average density of 511.1 per square mile (197.3/km^{2}). The racial makeup of the city was 99.0% White, 0.3% Native American, 0.1% Asian, and 0.6% from two or more races. Hispanic or Latino of any race were 0.9% of the population.

There were 297 households, of which 32.7% had children under the age of 18 living with them, 51.2% were married couples living together, 11.4% had a female householder with no husband present, 4.0% had a male householder with no wife present, and 33.3% were non-families. 29.3% of all households were made up of individuals, and 14.5% had someone living alone who was 65 years of age or older. The average household size was 2.30 and the average family size was 2.82.

The median age in the city was 39.5 years. 25.7% of residents were under the age of 18; 6.7% were between the ages of 18 and 24; 23.9% were from 25 to 44; 27.1% were from 45 to 64; and 16.6% were 65 years of age or older. The gender makeup of the city was 48.8% male and 51.2% female.

=== 2000 census ===
As of the census of 2000, there were 716 people, 286 households, and 195 families living in the city. The population density was 1,008.2 inhabitants per square mile (389.3/km^{2}). There were 305 housing units at an average density of 429.5 per square mile (165.8/km^{2}). The racial makeup of the city was 97.21% White, 0.84% African American, 0.98% Native American, 0.42% Asian, and 0.56% from two or more races. Hispanic or Latino of any race were 0.56% of the population.

There were 286 households, out of which 34.6% had children under the age of 18 living with them, 60.8% were married couples living together, 5.6% had a female householder with no husband present, and 31.5% were non-families. 27.3% of all households were made up of individuals, and 16.8% had someone living alone who was 65 years of age or older. The average household size was 2.49 and the average family size was 3.08.

In the city, the population was spread out, with 28.5% under the age of 18, 7.0% from 18 to 24, 28.5% from 25 to 44, 18.3% from 45 to 64, and 17.7% who were 65 years of age or older. The median age was 36 years. For every 100 females, there were 97.8 males. For every 100 females age 18 and over, there were 91.8 males.

The median income for a household in the city was $45,000, and the median income for a family was $49,261. Males had a median income of $30,550 versus $23,092 for females. The per capita income for the city was $19,439. None of the families and 2.9% of the population were living below the poverty line, including no under eighteens and 6.7% of those over 64.

== Education ==
Benton Community School District operates local public schools.
