= Matthew Whitaker =

American lawyer and politician (born 1969)

Matt Whitaker
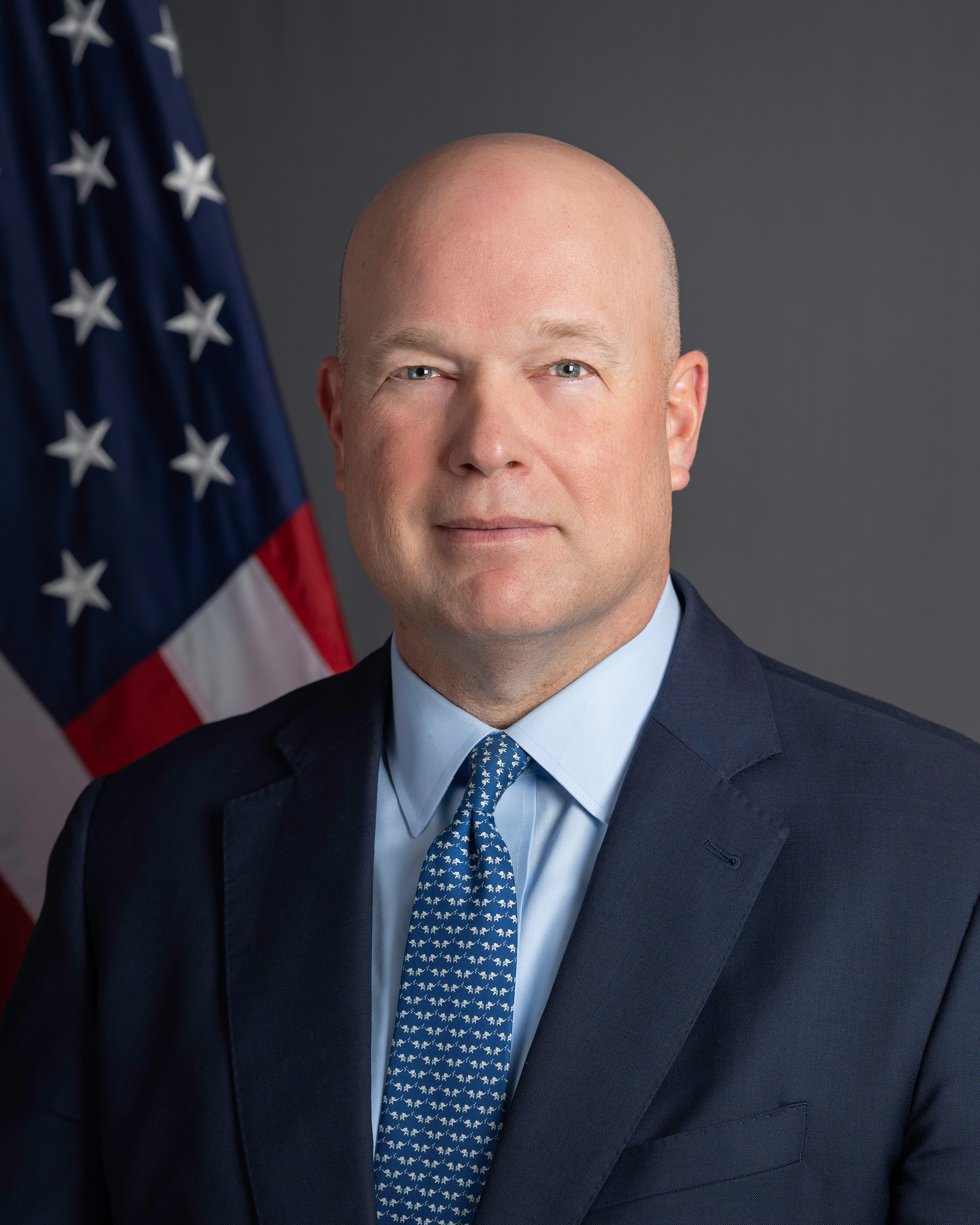
- Official portrait, 2025

26th United States Ambassador to NATO
- Incumbent
- Assumed office April 3, 2025
- President: Donald Trump
- Preceded by: Julianne Smith

Acting United States Attorney General
- In office November 7, 2018 – February 14, 2019
- President: Donald Trump
- Deputy: Rod Rosenstein
- Preceded by: Rod Rosenstein (acting)
- Succeeded by: William Barr

United States Attorney for the Southern District of Iowa
- In office June 15, 2004 – November 25, 2009
- President: George W. Bush; Barack Obama
- Preceded by: Stephen O'Meara
- Succeeded by: Nicholas A. Klinefeldt

Personal details
- Born: Matthew George Whitaker; October 29, 1969 (age 57) Des Moines, Iowa, U.S.
- Party: Republican
- Children: 3
- Education: University of Iowa (BA, MBA, JD)

Matthew George Whitaker (born October 29, 1969) is an American lawyer, politician, and diplomat serving as the 26th United States ambassador to NATO since 2025 in the second administration of President Donald Trump. A member of the Republican Party, he previously served in Trump's first administration as acting United States attorney general from November 2018 to February 2019, following the resignation of Jeff Sessions. Whitaker had previously served as Chief of Staff for Sessions from October 2017 to November 2018.

While attending the University of Iowa, Whitaker played tight end for the University of Iowa Hawkeyes football team, including in the 1991 Rose Bowl.

In 2002, Whitaker was the Republican nominee for Treasurer of Iowa, losing to incumbent Michael Fitzgerald. From 2004 to 2009, he served as the United States Attorney for the Southern District of Iowa, where he was known for aggressively prosecuting drug traffickers. Whitaker ran in the 2014 Iowa Republican primary for the United States Senate. He later wrote opinion pieces and appeared on talk-radio shows and cable news as the executive director of the Foundation for Accountability and Civic Trust (FACT), a conservative advocacy group.

On February 15, 2019, after William Barr was sworn in as Attorney General, Whitaker became a senior counselor in the Office of the Associate Attorney General; he resigned from the Justice Department on March 2, 2019. After leaving the Justice Department, Whitaker became a guest on news and analysis shows including as a CNN contributor, and was affiliated with the law firm of Graves Garrett. In August 2019, he became a managing director at Axiom Strategies and Clout Public Affairs.

On November 20, 2024, Whitaker was announced by Donald Trump as the nominee to serve as the United States ambassador to NATO in the second Trump administration. He was confirmed by the Senate on April 1, 2025, by a vote of 52–45, and was sworn in two days later.

== Early life, education, and college football career ==
Matthew George Whitaker was born in Des Moines, Iowa, on October 29, 1969. He graduated from Ankeny High School, where he was a football star. He was inducted into the Iowa High School Football Hall of Fame in 2009. Whitaker attended the University of Iowa, receiving a bachelor's degree in communications in 1991 and Master of Business Administration and Juris Doctor degrees from the Tippie College of Business & the University of Iowa College of Law in 1995.

As an undergraduate between 1990 and 1992, Whitaker was the backup tight end for the University of Iowa Hawkeyes football team under coach Hayden Fry. Whitaker played in 33 games, including two bowl games, and made 21 receptions for a total of 203 yards, scoring two touchdowns. In 1993, he received the Big Ten Medal of Honor for proficiency in scholarship and athletics awarded each year to one male and one female student-athlete at each Big Ten Conference school. Whitaker graduated from college in three-and-a-half years, and played his last season of football while attending law school. He was GTE's 1992 GTE District VII Academic All-District selection.

== Career ==
After graduating from law school, Whitaker lived in Minneapolis, Minnesota, from 1995 to 2001, before moving back to Iowa.

=== Private practice and business and political activities (1995–2004) ===
Whitaker worked for a number of regional law firms, including Briggs & Morgan (Minneapolis) and Finley Alt Smith (Des Moines), and he was corporate counsel for national grocery store chain SuperValu in Minneapolis. He also owned or co-owned a trailer manufacturing company from 2002 to 2005 and a day-care center from 2003 to 2015. In 2003, Whitaker and a partner co-founded Buy the Yard Concrete, based at Whitaker's home in Urbandale, Iowa.

Whitaker ran as a Republican for Treasurer of Iowa in 2002, losing to incumbent Democrat Michael Fitzgerald by 55% to 43%.

=== United States Attorney ===
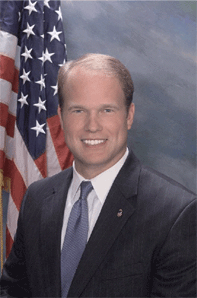
Whitaker's U.S. Attorney portrait

Iowa Senator Chuck Grassley recommended Whitaker as one of three attorneys suggested to President George W. Bush for the position of United States Attorney for the Southern District of Iowa. In February 2004, Bush nominated Whitaker to the position. Senate Democrats objecting to Bush nominees held up the nomination for four months before Whitaker was confirmed on June 15, 2004.

In his first year in office, Whitaker issued a record 500 indictments, more than half of which were drug prosecutions, mainly related to trafficking of methamphetamine. In July 2005, Whitaker joined neighboring U.S. Attorneys Michael Heavican of Nebraska and Charles Larson Sr. of northern Iowa, in issuing a warning that persons crossing state lines to obtain pseudoephedrine, a methamphetamine ingredient, could be prosecuted in federal court. As U.S. Attorney, Whitaker sought stringent sentences for individuals charged with drug crimes. One case involved a woman who had two prior nonviolent drug convictions and was informed by Whitaker's office that, as a third-time offender, her sentence could be enhanced to a mandatory life sentence unless she agreed to a plea deal of 21 to 27 years in prison. She agreed to the plea bargain. Obama commuted her sentence after she had served 11 years in prison.

Whitaker also served on a regional anti-terrorism task force, which examined both international and domestic threats, and focused on prosecuting child pornography and violent crimes against children. From 2005 to 2007, Whitaker's office, together with the FBI, investigated and unsuccessfully prosecuted Iowa State Senator Matt McCoy on charges of attempting to extort $2,000. A columnist for The Des Moines Register said that the case was based on "the word of a man former associates depicted as a drug user, a deadbeat and an abuser of women; a man so shady even his Alcoholics Anonymous sponsors called him 'a pathological liar.'" The jury reached a verdict of not guilty within two hours. In 2007, Whitaker also led the investigation of four executives of the Central Iowa Employment and Training Consortium (CIETC), a Des Moines-based job training agency, who were accused of collectively stealing more than $2 million from the agency over a three-year period. The alleged ringleader, CIETC CEO Ramona Cunningham, pleaded guilty on June 30, 2008.

Whitaker resigned in November 2009 following the Senate confirmation of his replacement, Nicholas A. Klinefeldt, who was nominated by President Obama.

=== Private practice and business and political activities (2009–2017) ===
From 2009 to 2017, Whitaker was a managing partner of the small general practice law firm Whitaker Hagenow & Gustoff LLP (later Hagenow & Gustoff LLP) in Des Moines.

In 2011, Whitaker applied for an appointment to the Iowa Supreme Court but was not among the finalists whose names were submitted to the governor for selection for one of the three open seats.

In 2011, he co-founded Whitaker Strategy Group, a lobbying and consulting firm.

In 2012, Whitaker and two partners invested, under a venture named MEM Investment, in the purchase and development of an affordable-housing apartment building in Des Moines. In 2014, Whitaker's partners left this partnership, and by spring of 2016, after years of rising costs, the building was sold as part of an exit agreement.

Whitaker was a candidate for the Republican nomination in the 2014 United States Senate election in Iowa. He came in fourth in the Republican primary, with 11,909 votes (7.54%). Whitaker then chaired the campaign of Sam Clovis for Iowa State Treasurer. Clovis lost in the November 2014 general election.

==== World Patent Marketing ====
From 2014 to 2017, Whitaker served as a member of the World Patent Marketing advisory board. In 2017, the FTC filed a civil action against the company; the matter was resolved in May 2018 through a mediated settlement in which the defendants neither admitted nor denied the allegations. Additionally, a related consumer class-action lawsuit was dismissed in March 2019 by U.S. District Judge Jed S. Rakoff (Case 1:16-cv-09828-JSR). The court-appointed receiver in the case stated he had "no reason to believe" that Whitaker was aware of any wrongdoing.

==== Foundation for Accountability and Civic Trust ====
From October 2014 to September 2017, Whitaker was the executive director of the Foundation for Accountability and Civic Trust (FACT); he was the organization's only full-time employee in 2015 and 2016. FACT, founded in late 2014, is a conservative nonprofit organization specializing in legal and ethical issues related to politics. The group was backed by $1 million in seed money from conservative donors. According to the organization's first tax return, its funding – $600,000 in 2014 – came from a conservative donor-advised fund called Donors Trust. From its creation in 2014 through 2018, FACT reported contributions of $3.5 million on its tax filings. Whitaker earned $1.2 million from the group over four years.

While Whitaker was the head of FACT, the organization had a special focus on the Hillary Clinton email controversy and perceived favoritism in the business dealings of Clinton. The organization called for ethics investigations into or filed complaints for more than 40 different Democratic politicians, officials, and organizations, compared to only a few Republicans. During his time at FACT, Whitaker wrote opinion pieces that appeared in USA Today and the Washington Examiner, and he appeared regularly on conservative talk-radio shows and cable news.

==== CNN contributor ====
For four months, from June to September 2017, Whitaker was a CNN contributor. One month prior to joining the Justice Department, he wrote an opinion column for CNN titled "Mueller's Investigation of Trump is Going Too Far". He retweeted a link to an article that stated that Mueller's investigation was a "lynch mob", that it should be limited, and that it should not probe into Trump's finances.

=== First Trump administration ===
==== Department of Justice Chief of Staff ====
On September 22, 2017, a Justice Department official announced that Sessions was appointing Whitaker to replace Jody Hunt as his chief of staff. George J. Terwilliger III, a former U.S. attorney and deputy attorney general, said in his role as chief of staff, Whitaker would have dealt daily with making "substantive choices about what is important to bring to the AG". As Chief of Staff, Whitaker discussed with and transmitted to U.S. Attorney for Utah John W. Huber a letter from Sessions regarding investigating former Secretary of State Hillary Clinton at Trump's request. While the Justice Department denied the letter existed in response to a Freedom of Information Act request filed by watchdog group American Oversight, it later retracted the denial and made public an email from Whitaker to Huber about the investigation and attaching Sessions' letter.

==== Acting Attorney General ====
With the resignation of Sessions on November 7, 2018, Whitaker was appointed to serve as Acting Attorney General under the Federal Vacancies Reform Act of 1998. In that position, he directly supervised Robert Mueller's Special Counsel investigation, which had previously been supervised by Deputy Attorney General Rod Rosenstein in his role as Acting Attorney General, due to the recusal of Attorney General Jeff Sessions.

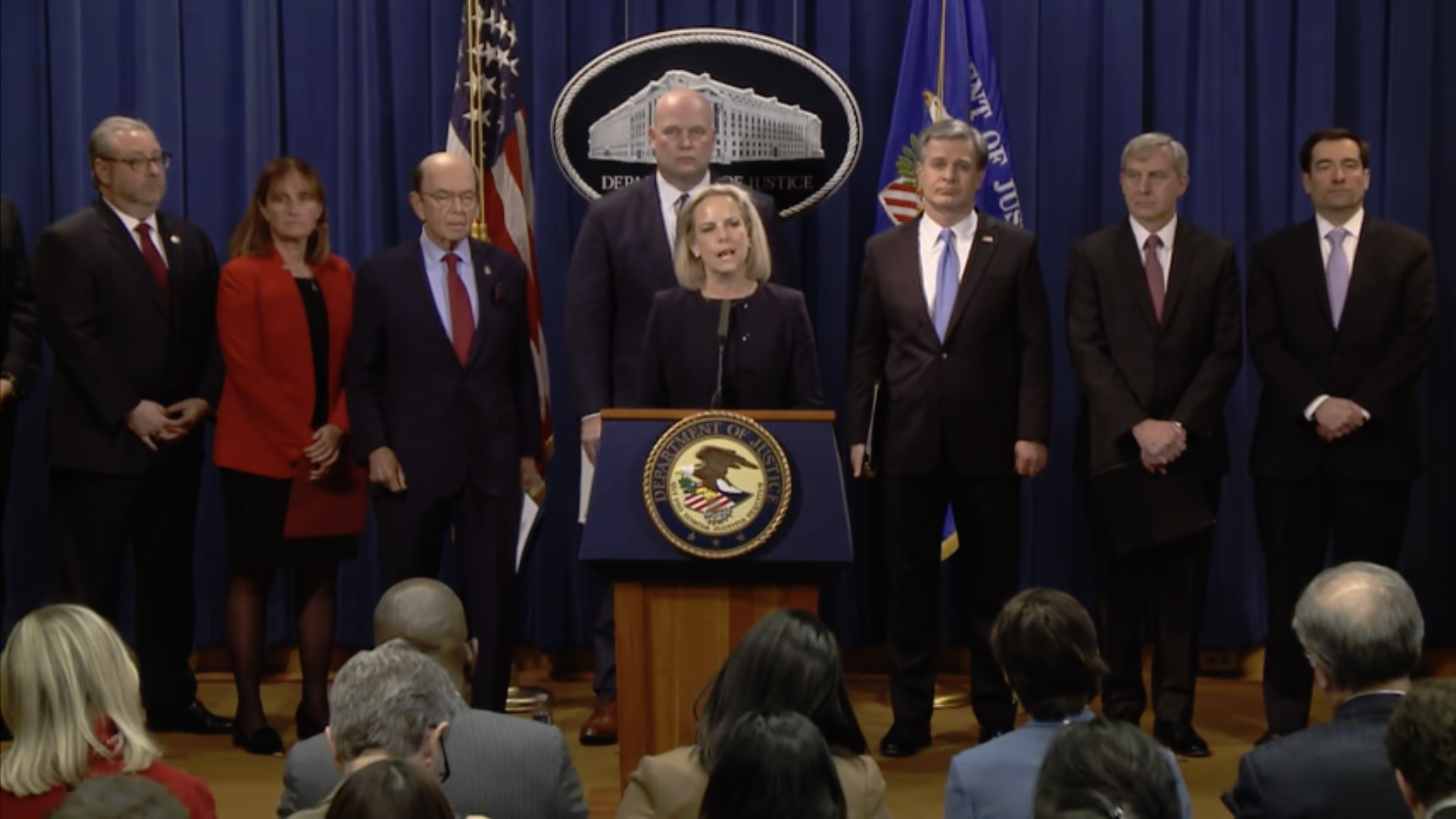
Department of Justice, Department of Homeland Security, Department of Commerce and Federal Bureau of Investigation announces 23 criminal charges against China's Huawei and Meng Wanzhou.

In January 2019, Whitaker along with Homeland Security Secretary Kirstjen Nielsen, Secretary of Commerce Wilbur Ross, and FBI Director Christopher A. Wray announced 23 criminal charges against Chinese technology giant Huawei and its CFO Meng Wanzhou, including financial fraud, money laundering, conspiracy to defraud the United States, theft of trade secret technology, providing bonuses to workers who stole confidential information from companies around the world, wire fraud, obstruction of justice and sanctions violations. In late 2018, he rejected a request from U.S. Attorney Geoffrey Berman to file criminal charges against Halkbank, the largest state-owned bank in Turkey, for an alleged multi-billion-dollar scheme to evade U.S. sanctions on Iran. On December 18, 2018, Whitaker signed the regulation that reclassified bump stocks as machine guns, rendering them illegal to possess under federal law. The four members of Trump's Federal Commission on School Safety were appointed in the wake of the Marjory Stoneman Douglas High School massacre, with Whitaker replacing Sessions in November 2018. The commission's report issued in December 2018, called for improved mental health services, recommended that school systems consider arming teachers and other personnel; and advised against increasing the minimum age required for firearm purchases. The report advised rescinding an Obama-era policy advising schools on how to discipline students in a nondiscriminatory manner.

Whitaker also initiated implementation of the First Step Act, a bipartisan criminal justice bill that enacted several changes in U.S. federal criminal law aimed at reforming federal prisons and sentencing laws in order to reduce recidivism, decreasing the federal inmate population, and maintaining public safety.

===== Supervision of the Special Counsel investigation =====
In 2017, Whitaker criticized the Mueller investigation on television and on social media and stated that there was no collusion between Russia and the Trump campaign. Justice Department ethics officials advised Whitaker that there was no financial, personal, or political conflict that would require him to recuse himself from supervision of the Russia investigation. Whitaker decided not to recuse himself, not wanting to be the first attorney general "who had recused [himself] based on statements in the news media."

Democrats poised to assume chairmanships of key House committees in January 2019 warned the Justice Department and other departments to preserve records relating to the Mueller investigation and Sessions' firing. Republicans Senator Susan Collins, Senator Jeff Flake, and Senator-elect Mitt Romney, also issued statements insisting that Mueller's investigation must remain free from interference. In February 2019, Whitaker testified before Congress that he had not interfered in any way in the special counsel investigation, and in July 2019, Special Counsel Robert Mueller confirmed in his own testimony before Congress that there was no interference with the investigation.

==== Legality and constitutionality of the appointment ====
There were several unsuccessful legal challenges to Whitaker's appointment. In a 2018 opinion, the U.S. Department of Justice's Office of Legal Counsel (OLC) said that the appointment was constitutional due to its temporary nature. The OLC noted that an assistant attorney general who was not confirmed by the Senate had been appointed as acting Attorney General in 1866, and that other individuals not confirmed by the Senate had served as principal officers in an acting capacity more than 160 times between 1809 and 1860, and at least nine times during the Trump, Obama, and Bush administrations.

Attorney Tom Goldstein filed a motion with the U.S. Supreme Court on November 16, 2018, on behalf of a Nevada resident, asking the court to decide whether Rod Rosenstein was the statutory and constitutional successor to Sessions in a pending lawsuit, rather than Whitaker. The U.S. Supreme Court denied the motion on January 14, 2019.

=== Second Trump administration ===
==== Nomination as U.S. ambassador to NATO ====
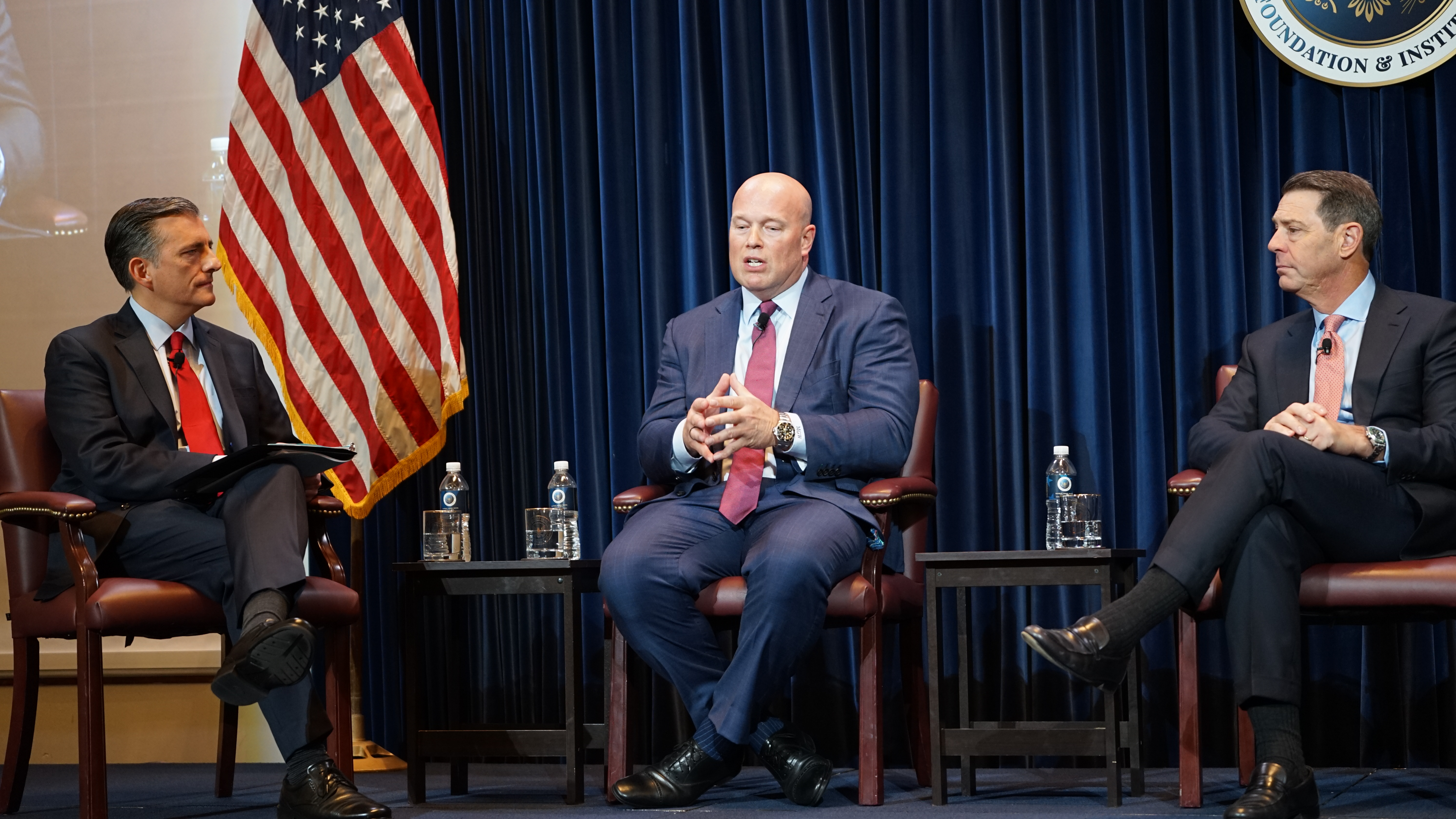
With David Trulio, Joseph Popolo at Reagan Library: "A Conversation with Ambassador Matthew Whitaker"

On November 20, 2024, Whitaker was announced as the nominee to serve as the United States ambassador to NATO by President-elect Donald Trump. On February 12, 2025, his nomination was sent to the Senate. His nomination was reported favorably by the Senate Foreign Relations Committee and sent to the floor on March 12. On April 1, Whitaker was confirmed by a Senate vote of 52–45, receiving the support of all Republicans and one Democrat, senator Jeanne Shaheen of New Hampshire.

== Legal and policy views ==
=== Constitutional issues ===
Whitaker stated in a question-and-answer session during his 2014 Iowa senatorial campaign that "the courts are supposed to be the inferior branch. We have unfortunately off loaded many of our tough public policy issues onto the court and they've decided them". Relatedly, Whitaker was critical of the U.S. Supreme Court's decision in Marbury v. Madison (1803), which allows for judicial review, because of "the way it's looked at the Supreme Court as the final arbiter of constitutional issues."

Whitaker also stated during his 2014 Senate bid that he would not support "secular" judges and that judges should "have a biblical view of justice". Asked if he meant Levitical or New Testament justice, he replied "I'm a New Testament". Although Whitaker never specifically commented on the ability of non-Christian judges to serve, Whitaker's answer was subsequently interpreted by various individuals and groups, including the Anti-Defamation League, to imply that he would disqualify non-Christian judges, and were condemned as unconstitutional. An ADL spokesperson said, "The notion that non-Christian judges are disqualified from service is patently wrong, and completely inconsistent with the U.S. Constitution, which explicitly bars any religious test for public office".

Whitaker stated in 2013 he supports the right of states to nullify federal laws.

=== Criticisms of 2017 Special Counsel investigation ===
During the months prior to joining the Justice Department as Jeff Sessions' chief of staff in September 2017, Whitaker made several statements critical of the Mueller investigation, of which he assumed oversight responsibility upon being appointed Acting Attorney General in November 2018. By July 2017, the Trump White House was interviewing Whitaker to join the Trump legal team. During a six-month span in 2017, Whitaker insisted that there was no obstruction of justice or collusion and criticized the initial appointment of the special counsel. He also called the probe "political" and "the left is trying to sow this theory that essentially Russians interfered with the U.S. election, which has been proven false". He also published an op-ed titled, "Mueller's Investigation of Trump Is Going Too Far" in which he expressed skepticism about the investigation generally and called the appointment of Mueller "ridiculous". He also retweeted a link to an article that referred to the investigation as a "lynch mob".

=== Relationship with Donald Trump ===
Trump saw Whitaker's supportive commentaries on CNN in the summer of 2017, and in July White House counsel Don McGahn interviewed Whitaker to join Trump's legal team as an "attack dog" against Robert Mueller, who was heading the Special Counsel investigation. Trump associates believe Whitaker was later hired to limit the fallout of the investigation, including by reining in any Mueller report and preventing Trump from being subpoenaed. On November 13, a DOJ spokesperson said that Whitaker would seek advice from ethics officials at the Department of Justice (DOJ) about whether a recusal from overseeing the Russia investigation was warranted. Officials advised Whitaker that there was no financial, personal, or political conflict that would require him to recuse himself.

In 2017, Vox writer Murray Waas, reported that an unnamed administration source claimed that Whitaker provided private advice to Trump on how the White House might pressure the Justice Department "to name a special counsel to investigate not only allegations of FBI wrongdoing but also Hillary Clinton". Leonard Leo of the Federalist Society recommended Whitaker to McGahn as chief of staff for Sessions, and Whitaker was installed into that role at the direction of the White House. An anonymous source claimed that Whitaker wanted to replace Sessions, without the latter's knowledge. By early September 2018, Whitaker was on the short list of President Trump's White House staff as the replacement for Don McGahn as the White House Counsel. In September 2018, White House Chief of Staff John F. Kelly referred to Whitaker as the White House's "eyes and ears" in the Justice Department, which the president considered himself at war with.

Trump had spoken with Whitaker in September 2018 about potentially assuming Sessions's role as Attorney General, although it was not clear whether Whitaker would take over on an interim basis or be nominated in a more permanent capacity. At that time, The New York Times described Whitaker as a Trump loyalist who had frequently visited the Oval Office and as having "an easy chemistry" with Trump. Whitaker was referenced by White House staff after a New York Times article disclosed in September that Rod Rosenstein had discussed secretly taping his conversations with the president and talked about using the Twenty-fifth Amendment to remove Trump from office. Trump repeatedly stated on November 9, "I don't know Matt Whitaker", contradicting remarks a month prior on Fox & Friends when he said, "I can tell you Matt Whitaker's a great guy. I mean, I know Matt Whitaker".

In October 2019, after leaving the White House, Whitaker defended Trump amid the impeachment investigation into his conduct as president. Whitaker said there was no evidence of a crime by the President, and that "abuse of power is not a crime" in the Constitution.

=== Other policy issues ===
Whitaker's website previously stated that he was a "Christian who regularly attends church with his family, Matt has built a life on hard work and free enterprise"; and he stated in 2014 that "life begins at conception". In 2014, he advocated for reducing the influence of the government saying, "I know that the government forcing people to violate their faith must never be tolerated. In the Senate, I will be a steadfast protector of every American's religious rights". Whitaker stated he was not a "climate change denier" but said that the evidence is "inconclusive" and indicated he did not support regulations on carbon emissions.

Whitaker has expressed opposition to amnesty for undocumented immigrants who are already inside the U.S.

In 2014, Whitaker represented a blogger who was fired from his job for his description of homosexuality. He argued the blogger had engaged in a legitimate expression of religious beliefs that should be considered protected speech, saying, "I just really think this case is a prime example of where religious freedom in our country is under assault and we need to send a strong message".

Whitaker supported repealing the Affordable Care Act in his 2014 Senate campaign.

Regarding issues about increases in defense spending of European NATO partners, Whitaker opposes what he calls an "expanded view", specifically Italy's plans to construct the world's longest suspension bridge thought to facilitate the movement of Italian and allied armed forces between Mainland Italy and Sicily.

== Electoral history ==
=== 2002 Iowa State Treasurer ===
General election results
| Party | Candidate | Votes | % |
|---|---|---|---|
| Democratic | Michael Fitzgerald | 534,714 | 54.77% |
| Republican | Matthew Whitaker | 421,574 | 43.18% |
| Libertarian | Tim Hird | 19,687 | 2.02% |
| Republican | Write-ins | 344 | 0.04% |
| Total votes | | 976,319 | 100.00% |

=== 2014 U.S. Senator for Iowa ===
Republican primary results
| Party | Candidate | Votes | % |
|---|---|---|---|
| Republican | Joni Ernst | 88,535 | 56.12% |
| Republican | Sam Clovis | 28,418 | 18.01% |
| Republican | Mark Jacobs | 26,523 | 16.81% |
| Republican | Matthew Whitaker | 11,884 | 7.53% |
| Republican | Scott Schaben | 2,233 | 1.42% |
| Republican | Write-ins | 155 | 0.10% |
| Total votes | | 157,748 | 100.00% |

== Writings ==
- Above the Law: The Inside Story of How the Justice Department Tried to Subvert President Trump. Regnery Publishing. 2020. ISBN 978-1-68451-049-8.

== See also ==
- Timeline of investigations into Trump and Russia (July–December 2018)

Party political offices
| Preceded by Joan Bolin | Republican nominee for Treasurer of Iowa; 2002 | Vacant Title next held by David Jamison; 2010 |
Legal offices
| Preceded by Stephen O'Meara | United States Attorney for the Southern District of Iowa; 2004–2009 | Succeeded by Nicholas A. Klinefeldt |
| Preceded by Rod Rosenstein; Acting | United States Attorney General; Acting; 2018–2019 | Succeeded by William Barr |
Diplomatic posts
| Preceded by Julianne Smith | United States Ambassador to NATO; 2025–present | Incumbent |
