= 1977 New York City Council presidential election =

- November 8, 1977
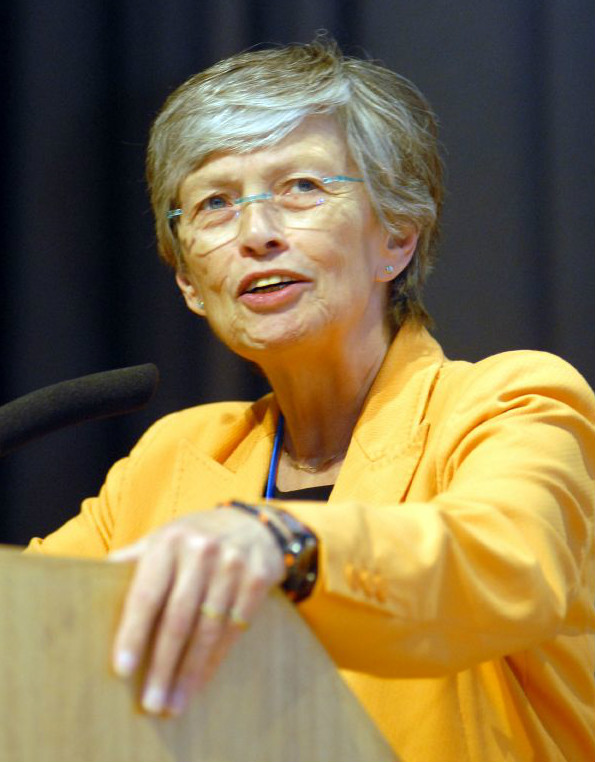

Nominee	Carol Bellamy	John Esposito	Abe Hirschfeld
Party	Democratic	Republican	Conservative
Alliance	Liberal
Popular vote	1,037,419	137,111	79,502
Percentage	82.7%	10.9%	6.3%
President of the City Council before election
Paul O'Dwyer
Democratic
Elected President of the City Council
Carol Bellamy
Democratic

An election was held on November 8, 1977 to elect the President of the New York City Council. Democratic incumbent Paul O'Dwyer ran for re-election to a second term in office but was defeated in the Democratic primary by Carol Bellamy in a historic upset. After winning the general election easily over Republican John Esposito and Conservative Abe Hirschfeld, Bellamy became the first woman elected to citywide office in New York City history.

== Democratic primary ==
=== Candidates ===
- Carol Bellamy, State Senator
- Carter Burden, City Councilman
- Abe Hirschfeld, real estate developer (running with Herman Badillo)
- Paul O'Dwyer, incumbent Council President since 1974
- Leonard P. Stavisky, Assemblyman from Queens

=== Campaign ===
From the start, Bellamy's campaign lacked the financial support of her opponents, who included the wealthy Manhattan developer Abe Hirschfeld and City Councilman Carter Burden, a member of the Vanderbilt family. Burden and Hirschfeld spent $500,000 and $300,000, respectively, drawn largely from their personal fortunes, the incumbent O'Dwyer spent about $200,000, and Bellamy spent only $90,000. She also lacked the citywide name recognition of the incumbent, a seventy-year veteran of multiple campaigns for the United States Senate, and Assemblyman Leonard P. Stavisky. Bellamy, at only thirty-five years old, was also half the age of O'Dwyer.

Despite these disadvantages and poor public opinion polling, which showed her trailing the incumbent by twenty-five points, Bellamy maintained a public mood of optimism. Her campaign, staffed and funded by young volunteers, distributed over 1.7 million leaflets and pamphlets over the last five months of the campaign. She also boasted a number of key institutional endorsements, including the support of all three major daily newspapers in the city. The New Democratic Coalition, which O'Dwyer had founded and led, declined to make an endorsement, but delegates to its city convention backed Bellamy over O'Dwyer by 57.1 to 26.1 percent.

Late in the campaign, Hirschfeld formed an alliance with mayoral candidate Herman Badillo, who had been the runner-up in the 1973 mayoral primary but was struggling to gain support outside of the city's Puerto Rican population.

=== Polling ===
Poll source	Sample size	Dates administered	Carol Bellamy	Carter Burden	Abe Hirschfield	Paul O'Dwyer	Leonard Stavisky	Other/ Undecided
The New York Times/CBS News	1,327 RV	August 13–20, 1977	5%	14%	18%	30%	3%	30%

=== Results ===
1977 Democratic Council President primary
Party	Candidate	Votes	%
Democratic	Paul O'Dwyer (incumbent)	225,021	30.53%
Democratic	Carol Bellamy	186,775	25.34%
Democratic	Carter Burden	145,750	19.77%
Democratic	Abe Hirschfeld	123,767	16.79%
Democratic	Leonard P. Stavisky	55,856	7.58%
Total votes		737,169	100.00%

At her election night party, Bellamy shouted to her supporters, "This is a great night for New York!" Addressing the crowd, she continued, "There is a sense in the city of people looking for new leadership, and for all the talk of apathy, I think that the people were looking at the records of the candidates." (In the concurrent Democratic mayoral primary, incumbent Abraham Beame failed to qualify for the runoff election.)

O'Dwyer acknowledged the primary had been a hard-fought campaign and characterized Bellamy as a "good, able campaigner."

Despite his defeat in the primary, Hirschfeld won the endorsement of the Conservative Party of New York to appear on the November general election ballot.

=== Runoff campaign ===
The runoff election was held ten days after the initial primary.Both candidates struck a positive tone on the first day of campaigning, with Bellamy stating, "Paul's a fine individual, but he has not been as active as he should have been in the Board of Estimate or during the fiscal crisis. My performance has been one of action and Paul's one of passivity in office." O'Dwyer, who conceded that he had expected to face Burden, stressed his incumbency. Both candidates predicted they would win the runoff.

Bellamy soon announced the endorsements of thirty federal, state and local elected officials. She scored another surprise upset by leading all three ballots of the city chapter of Americans for Democratic Action, though she fell short of the sixty percent required for a formal endorsement.

O'Dwyer charged Bellamy with inexperience, while Bellamy countered that the city needed a stronger Council President. O'Dwyer expected strong support from minority groups, boasting of his endorsements from Percy Sutton, Herman Badillo and Abe Hirschfeld. He publicly stated, "I'm not a black or Puerto Rican, and I can't think like a black or Puerto Rican, but I can say I am the closest thing running, and I am committed to their difficulties." When questioned about her strength with minority voters, she pointed to support from state senators Robert Garcia, Major Owens and Carl McCall and stated, "I think I've been responsive to the needs of minorities and will do well among them."

Carol Bellamy runoff endorsements
- Robert Abrams, Bronx Borough President
- Carter Burden, City Councilman and candidate in Council President primary
- Robert Garcia, State Senator from the Bronx
- Mary Anne Krupsak, Lieutenant Governor of New York
- H. Carl McCall, State Senator from Harlem
- Manfred Ohrenstein, State Senator from Manhattan and Senate Minority Leader
- Major Owens, State Senator from Brooklyn
- Harrison Goldin, New York City Comptroller
- The New York Times
Paul O'Dwyer runoff endorsements
- Abraham Beame, incumbent mayor of New York City
- Herman Badillo, U.S. Representative from the South Bronx and former candidate in mayoral primary (previously endorsed Hirschfeld)
- Abe Hirschfeld, real estate developer and candidate in Council President primary
- Leonard P. Stavisky, Assemblyman from Queens and candidate in Council President primary
- Percy Sutton, Manhattan Borough President and former candidate in mayoral primary

=== Runoff results ===
1977 Democratic Council President runoff (partial, unofficial)
Party	Candidate	Votes	%
Democratic	Carol Bellamy	435,662	58.75%
Democratic	Paul O'Dwyer (incumbent)	305,860	41.25%
Total votes		741,522	100.00%

== General election ==
=== Candidates ===
- Carol Bellamy, State Senator (Democratic and Liberal)
- John A. Esposito, Assemblyman from Queens (Republican)
- Abe Hirschfeld, real estate developer and candidate in Democratic primary (Conservative)

=== Results ===
1977 New York City Council President election (unofficial)
Party	Candidate	Votes	%
Democratic	Carol Bellamy	1,037,419	82.73%
Republican	John A. Esposito	137,111	10.93%
Conservative	Abe Hirschfeld	79,502	6.34%
Total votes		1,254,032	100.00%
