= Central Iowa Regional Association of Local Governments =

Former government agency in Iowa, United States

The Central Iowa Regional Association of Local Governments (CIRALG) was the metropolitan planning organization and council of governments for the Des Moines metropolitan area in Iowa, United States. It was formed in 1965 as the Central Iowa Regional Planning Commission (CIRPC) and was reconstituted in 1973 with a new governance structure. The organization was folded in 1983 as a result of a federal investigation into financial mismanagement of grants received by the agency's employment programs. A component of CIRALG, the Des Moines Area Transportation Planning Committee, survived and received official designation as the MPO for the Des Moines region, changing its name in 1993 to the Des Moines Area Metropolitan Planning Organization.

== History ==
=== Central Iowa Regional Planning Commission ===
The Central Iowa Regional Planning Commission was first proposed in 1964, and municipalities and counties began to join, paying into the new body at a rate of two cents per resident. The Iowa General Assembly had authorized the creation of such commissions in its 1963 session. While the agency was initially concerned with metropolitan planning, it expanded its scope in 1967 to include the review of federal grant applications by cities in the metro area after being designated as the regional body for such activity by the United States Department of Housing and Urban Development (HUD). CIRPC studies focused on topics such as power line corridors, transportation, solid waste, and recreation; the agency also helped to establish bodies tackling crime, drug abuse, and the airport. Despite nominally covering a nine-county area, by January 1971 Polk, Dallas, Warren, and Marion counties and 35 municipalities had become members, with Polk County accounting for nearly half of the agency's membership. One of the member counties, Warren, pulled out in April, citing its dissatisfaction with having to go through CIRPC for access to federal funds.

The CIRPC entered into a funding crisis in late-1971, when it voted to close down unless federal funding could be obtained to make payroll and settle unpaid bills. Though the commission was able to continue to function, a January 1972 ruling over the contentious Des Moines north-south freeway battle found that the CIRPC did not have the authority to review members' federal funding applications.

=== Reorganization into CIRALG ===
1972 also brought the CIRPC's first change in director, as Robert Mickle made way for Joel Gunnells in an organizational restructuring. Bigger changes were on the way. In July, the commission proposed a restructuring that would increase the voting strength of Des Moines, Polk County and Ames; under the CIRPC, Des Moines, with 200,000 residents, had five votes, while the five smallest towns with one vote each had a combined 2,000 residents. This had prompted a threat by the mayor of Des Moines to withdraw. The planned shift in power would also expand the board's powers, allowing it to collect garbage, administer bus service and build a sewer system; in addition, most of the members would be elected officials. Two other critical reasons were cited for the reorganization into what became the Central Iowa Regional Association of Local Governments: HUD had decertified the CIRPC for having an unrepresentative organizational structure, while the Clean Water Act gave CIRPC the mandate to develop an area-wide wastewater treatment plan but its structure made it ineligible to do so.

On January 1, 1973, CIRALG succeeded the CIRPC. The new agency's expanded powers allowed it to launch a number of new programs in the subsequent years. CIRALG started a vocational training program, and disbursed federal funds to develop an area agency on aging; it would be heavily involved in both areas for the rest of its existence. Additionally, CIRALG continued with the planning portfolio of its predecessor, offering planning and zoning services to subscribing municipalities, particularly its smallest members.

However, central Iowans came to associate CIRALG with its most contentious subject matter: sewage. The development of a regional sewer system, and the power wielded by Des Moines in CIRALG, frustrated suburbs, who felt that the sewer plan adopted by CIRALG would limit regional development. The first in a five-part series of articles about the organization by the Des Moines Tribune in 1979 declared that the initials CIRALG "spell power in central Iowa". The employment program in particular had led to CIRALG's staff growing from 15 to 80 by the end of the decade.

The sewer controversy pitted Des Moines against Polk County, which harbored its own ambitions of leading the development of the system. Additionally, Polk County sought to take over the aging programs that were housed at CIRALG. Questioning high administrative costs and complications over the move of its offices, as well as CIRALG's expansion beyond planning, the county board of supervisors voted 3–2 in July 1981 to withdraw from the association. Additional problems had cropped up in the late 1970s and early 1980s, as well, related to its racial makeup: the Iowa chapter of the United States Commission on Civil Rights noted that the mayor of Des Moines had contributed to CIRALG's "all-white complexion" and lack of women and minorities.

=== Audit and dismantling ===
In 1980, CIRALG was audited by the state government in the wake of a struggle with one of its employment subcontractors, Iowa Comprehensive Manpower Services. The state audit criticized the agency's accounting of Comprehensive Employment and Training Act (CETA) funds for 1976, 1977, and 1978, raising the possibility that the agency could be forced to return a portion of its grant. However, it would be a second audit, by the federal government, that sounded the regional association's death knell. On April 1, 1982, the United States Department of Labor ordered CIRALG and the Central Iowa Employment and Training Consortium to return up to $1.1 million in CETA funds that were used to start other programs, an act prohibited by federal law. In June, Labor Department officials would additionally reveal the steering of grant monies to "administrative niceties".

The federal order prompted Polk County's supervisors to ask for a larger audit into CIRALG's activities. It also placed the association in immediate financial peril as it struggled to find monies to repay the Labor Department, troubles that were compounded when the state pulled funding for aging programs from the agency, leaving it with its planning functions. Local officials began to look at the creation of new agencies to salvage what a Des Moines Tribune editorial called CIRALG's "vital organs". As the year continued, local organizations and member towns and cities cut ties with the group, though some closer-in suburbs maintained their memberships. As the final tally showed the agency owed the federal government $731,000, the Central Iowa Regional Association of Local Governments shuttered in September 1983.

The Des Moines Area Transportation Planning Committee, which had been a part of CIRALG, survived the dissolution of its parent organization and became the new federally designated metropolitan planning organization for central Iowa, contracting with the city of Des Moines for staff assistance. It changed names to the Des Moines Area MPO in 1993. However, the region has lacked sufficient intergovernmental coordination in the metropolitan area since the demise of CIRALG.
