= Sarah Fisher Gardial =

American academic and teacher

- Born: Sarah; USA
- Education: University of Arkansas; University of Houston
- Occupation: Academic
- Employer: Belmont University Massey College of Business
- Known for: University of Iowa Tippie College of Business dean, 2012–2020
- Title: Dean
- Successor: Amy Kristof-Brown
- Board member of: GreenState Credit Union, United Fire Group, Learning Tree International

Sarah Fisher Gardial is an American academic and teacher. She became dean of Belmont University Massey College of Business in March 2020. She is also the former dean of Tippie College of Business at the University of Iowa.

== Early life ==
Sarah Fisher Gardial graduated from the University of Arkansas, where she earned a Bachelor of Science in business administration in 1980 and an MBA in 1981. She earned a PhD from the University of Houston in 1986.

== Career ==
Gardial taught at the University of Tennessee from 1986 to 2012.

Gardial was dean of Tippie College of Business during 2012 - 2020, where she was also a professor of marketing. She encouraged faculty to use real-life corporate situations rather than the traditional case method. She has also encouraged more women to enroll in the school's MBA program, and advocates for a shift in implicit cultural patterns that hamper equity for women.

In October 2019, she was named dean of Belmont University Massey College of Business, effective March 1, 2020.

Gardial serves on the boards of GreenState Credit Union, the United Fire Group, and Learning Tree International.

She co-authored marketing textbook Know Your Customer: New Approaches to Understanding Customer Value and Satisfaction.
