= Uits =

- Unemployment Insurance Tax System of Iowa, USA
- University of Information Technology and Sciences a private university in Dhaka, Bangladesh
- University Information Technology Services of the Indiana University, USA
