= Open Air PM =

Former New York City newspaper

Open Air PM was a New York City newspaper operated by real estate magnate Abe Hirschfeld and his daughter Rachel Hirschfeld. The paper was published from June 1996 to October 1996.

== History ==
Abe Hirschfeld and his daughter, attorney Rachel Hirschfeld, founded Open Air PM in 1996. They set up their operation and did all the work in The Pennsylvania Hotel, which he owned at the time.

Before publishing Open Air PM, Abe had owned the New York Post. He took the Post over during its bankruptcy and was famous for telling people that he saved the Post. However, the Post writers refused to work with Abe and it ended up a turbulent time. Pete Hamill, the Post's editor ran a cover photo of Alexander Hamilton, the Post~~{{{1}}}~~ founder, with a tear in his eye.

Rachel Hirschfeld was a close friend of the wife of Ben Blank, one of the largest advertisers in the New York Post. Ben then introduced Rachel to Rupert Murdoch.

After talking with Rachel, Rupert Murdoch flew into New York from Australia and met with Rachel and Abe. At that meeting, an agreement was reached and Murdoch bought the New York Post from Abe on March 29, 1993.

After Hirschfeld's sale of the New York Post, he founded Open Air PM along with his daughter Rachel Hirschfeld. Open Air was the first newspaper to carry color photos of the news on its front page. Its motto was "Love thy Neighbor," taken from the title of a play Hirschfeld had produced starring Jackie Mason, and it focused on positive news stories instead of tabloid negativity.

The name Open Air comes from what Abe called his garages in New York City. Abe believed that cars do not need to be housed in parking lot that are like buildings. Cars can be housed in the open air, meaning, they do not need air conditioning, heating, walls or windows. All they need is a ramp to drive up on and then levels to stand in, just as though they were on the street.
