= CIETC =

Public agency in central Iowa, United States

The Central Iowa Employment and Training Consortium (CIETC) is a public agency formed in an agreement among the City of Des Moines, and the surrounding counties of Boone, Dallas, Jasper, Madison, Marion, Polk, Story and Warren.

The agency was the subject of local media coverage and controversy when the compensation plans for executives at CIETC were disclosed.

== Organization ==
Formed under Chapter 25E of the Iowa Code, CIETC is governed by a Board of Directors, composed of representatives appointed by the Mayor or chairperson of each participating entity and with approval by the respective Council or Board of Supervisors. Des Moines appoints three representatives, whereas Polk County has four representatives, and each remaining community has one representative each.

CIETC created an agreement with the 11th Regional Workforce Investment Board (RWIB) to provide employment and training services. CIETC administers three programs: Promise Jobs, WIA, and Welfare-to-work.

=== Promise Jobs ===
Promise Jobs is designed to provide training and increase the availability of employment opportunities to recipients of the Family Investment Program (FIP) as part of the Family Investment Agreement (FIA). The program is funded by the U.S. Department of Health & Human Services (DHHS) through the Temporary Assistance to Needy Families (TANF) program. Promise Jobs is administered by CIETC, Iowa Workforce Development and DHHS.

== Controversy ==
On March 31, 2006, David A. Vaudt from the Auditor's Office for the State of Iowa released a report concerning an investigation of misuse of federal and state funds to pay excessive salaries and bonuses to three executive members at CIETC. In 2007, U.S. Attorney Matthew Whitaker announced the indictment of four persons affiliated with the agency, who were accused of collectively stealing more than $2 million from the agency over a three-year period. The alleged ringleader, CEO Ramona Cunningham, pleaded guilty on June 30, 2008.
