= Hyatt Regency Times Square =

Hotel in Manhattan, New York

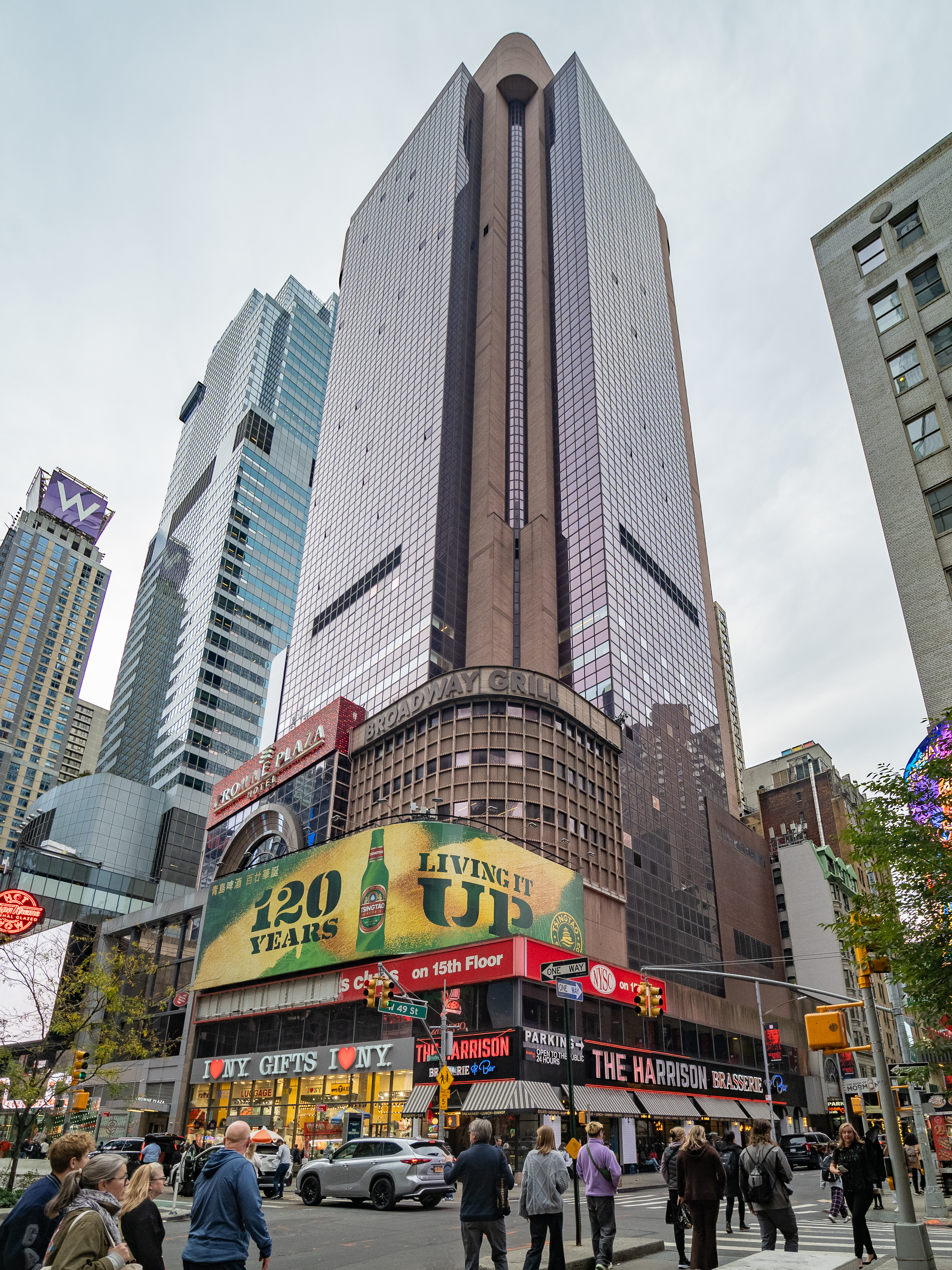
- Interactive map of the Hyatt Regency Times Square area

General information
- Location: 1605 Broadway, Manhattan, New York City
- Coordinates: 40°45′39″N 73°59′06″W
- Opening: December 1, 1989
- Owner: Argent Ventures
- Operator: Hyatt

Height
- Height: 480 feet (150 m)

Technical details
- Floor count: 46

Design and construction
- Architect: Alan Lapidus
- Developer: KG Crowne Corp

Other information
- Number of rooms: 795
- Parking: 159 spaces

The Hyatt Regency Times Square (formerly the Crowne Plaza Times Square Manhattan) is a hotel at 1605 Broadway, between 48th and 49th Streets, in the Theater District of Midtown Manhattan in New York City. The hotel is operated by third-party franchisee Highgate. The 795-room hotel was designed by Alan Lapidus and is 480 feet (150 m) tall with 46 floors. The facade was designed in glass and pink granite, with a 100-foot-tall (30 m) arch facing Broadway. The hotel was designed to comply with city regulations that required deep setbacks at the base, as well as large illuminated signs. In addition to the hotel rooms themselves, the hotel contains ground-story retail space, nine stories of office space, and a 159-space parking garage. The hotel's tenants include the American Management Association, and Learning Tree International; in addition, New York Sports Club was a former tenant.

Developer William Zeckendorf Jr. bought the hotel's site in 1985 and subsequently razed the existing structures there. Construction commenced in 1988, and the hotel opened on December 1, 1989, as the Holiday Inn Crowne Plaza Manhattan. For the first several years of the hotel's operation, its office space and exterior signage was empty. Adam Tihany redesigned the interior in 1999. The City Investment Fund, a joint venture between Morgan Stanley Real Estate and Fisher Brothers, bought the hotel in 2006 and renovated it again two years later. Vornado Realty Trust then acquired majority ownership of the hotel in 2015. The hotel closed in 2020 due to the COVID-19 pandemic in New York City and reopened in 2022. It closed again around January 2025 and reopened as a Hyatt Regency in July 2025.

== Site ==
The hotel occupies the eastern end of the city block bounded by Eighth Avenue to the west, 49th Street to the north, Broadway to the east, and 48th Street to the south. It is one block north of Times Square in the Theater District of Midtown Manhattan in New York City. The mostly trapezoidal land lot covers 35,275 square feet (3,277.2 m^{2}), with a frontage of 203 feet (62 m) on Broadway and a depth of 194.48 feet (59.28 m). The surrounding area is part of Manhattan's Theater District and contains many Broadway theatres. Nearby buildings include the St. Malachy Roman Catholic Church to the northwest; The Theater Center, Brill Building, and Ambassador Theatre to the north; 750 Seventh Avenue to the northeast; 1585 Broadway to the south; and the Longacre Theatre, Ethel Barrymore Theatre, and Samuel J. Friedman Theatre to the southwest.

Historically, the site had contained Churchill's Restaurant, which had been built in 1910 and redesigned as a theater in 1937. The theater later became an adult movie theater called the Pussycat Cinema. Just prior to the hotel's construction, the site had contained six pornographic businesses owned by Michael Zaffarano, including the Pussycat Cinema and the Kitty Kat and Mardi Gras Topless Disco. The Pussycat had contained a large neon sign; David W. Dunlap of The New York Times described the sign as an "exuberant cynosure of a naughtier, gaudier, vanishing Broadway". There had also been some "pinball and souvenir shops" on the site. Songwriter Irving Berlin had once also occupied a building on the site, as the offices of Irving Berlin Inc. had been at 1607 Broadway between 1921 and 1933.

== Architecture ==
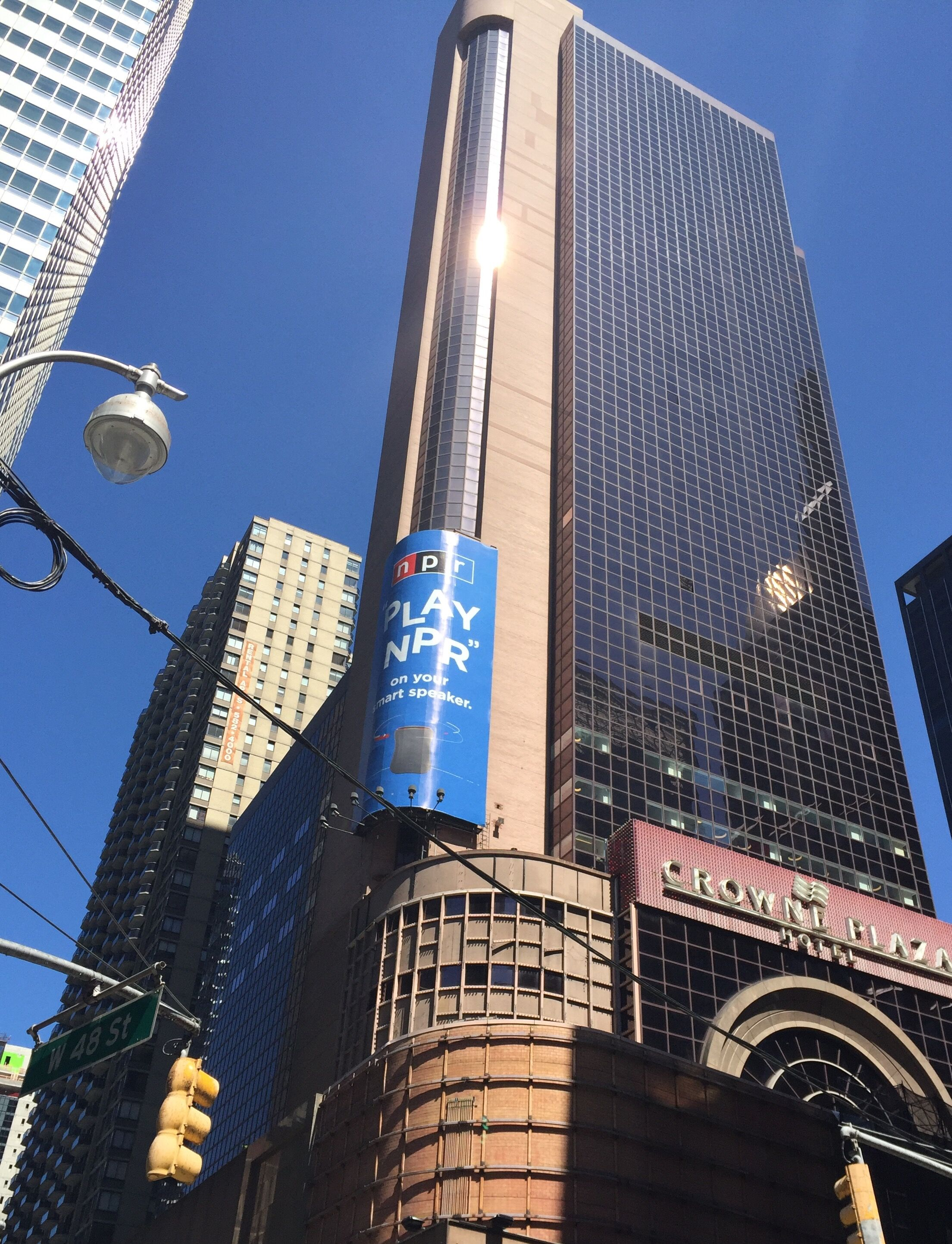
Daytime view from 49th Street and Broadway

The hotel was designed by Alan J. Lapidus, son of modernist architect Morris Lapidus. The hotel is 480 feet (150 m) with 46 floors. In addition to the 795-key hotel, the building contains 7,700 square feet (720 m^{2}) of ground-story retail space, 197,000 square feet (18,300 m^{2}) of office space, and a 159-space parking garage. The American Management Association's Executive Conference Center, is on the sixth through eighth floors with a total of 88,066 square feet (8,181.6 m^{2}). Learning Tree International and the New York Sports Club also had space as of 2018.

=== Facade ===
The facade was designed with glass and pink granite. Most of the facade is clad in reflective glass. The southeast and northeast corners are covered with granite, concealing the elevator shafts inside. The center of the Broadway facade contains a granite arch measuring 100 feet (30 m) tall. According to Lapidus, he wanted the arch's design to evoke the design of Wurlitzer organs from the 1930s and 1940s. The New York Times compared the hotel to a "giant jukebox".

The hotel was designed to comply with city regulations that required deep setbacks at the base, as well as large illuminated signs. Accordingly, the hotel rooms are deeply set back from Broadway, and the first seven stories were initially planned to contain curving signs. Lapidus wanted to include holographic displays, laser lighting displays, and waterfalls in the hotel's design. At the time of the hotel's construction, light meter technology was not advanced enough to determine how much light these features emitted, so Lapidus left provisions so these features could be installed later. As built, the hotel had large billboards on its first 12 stories to comply with the regulations. At the time of the hotel's opening, these signs had an annual maintenance cost of $100,000. In 1995, a sign measuring 100 by 20 feet (30.5 by 6.1 m) was installed on the southern wall.

=== Features ===
When the hotel was being built, it was variously cited as containing 765, 770, 778, 780, or 785 rooms. A 1992 news article cited the hotel as having 770 rooms and 25 suites. The top four floors were known as the Crowne Plaza Club, which charged an additional fee. Following a renovation in 2008, the 46th story was turned into a "butler floor" with 16 rooms; the floor was so named because guests were given complimentary services such as laundry and private transportation. In addition, the 128 rooms on the 41st through 45th floors were collectively labeled the "concierge levels".

At ground level, escalators led to a lobby and reception area on the second floor. The lobby area connected to a lounge and three restaurants. Holiday Inn originally reserved six floors for business patrons, who would pay an additional fee for extra services such as complimentary breakfast. To attract guests, each suite was designed with technologically advanced amenities of the time, such as modem connections and phone lines, as well as bathrooms clad with marble. In addition, there was a fitness center originally covering 8,800 square feet (820 m^{2}). The fitness center included a swimming pool measuring 50 feet (15 m) long. The fitness center was expanded to two floors in 1992. Following a renovation in 2008, the New York Sports Club started to operate the fitness center.

The building was designed with approximately 200,000 square feet (19,000 m^{2}) of office space on nine of the lower stories. The office space was placed on the 6th through 14th floors, with hotel rooms above and below. When it opened, the hotel had a business center with computers, stock quote machines, fax machines, and a secretarial service. The hotel also had a ballroom and over 20 conference rooms, which covered 18,000 square feet (1,700 m^{2}). By 2015, the ballroom could be rented as workspace.

== History ==
Times Square's Theater District had evolved into a business district after World War II. Nonetheless, there were relatively few large developments there in the mid-20th century. Between 1958 and 1983, only twelve buildings with at least 100,000 square feet (9,300 m^{2}) of space were developed in the 114-block area between Sixth Avenue, Times Square, Eighth Avenue, and Columbus Circle. By the 1980s, there was high demand for office space in New York City. During the decade, several hotels were developed around Times Square, as well as in New York City in general, as a result of growing tourism. These hotel developments were spurred by the success of the nearby New York Marriott Marquis, which had an occupancy rate of over 80 percent across nearly 2,000 rooms. In addition, the city government had enacted a zoning bonus in 1982 for large new buildings in West Midtown, but the bonus was scheduled to expire in 1988.

=== Development ===
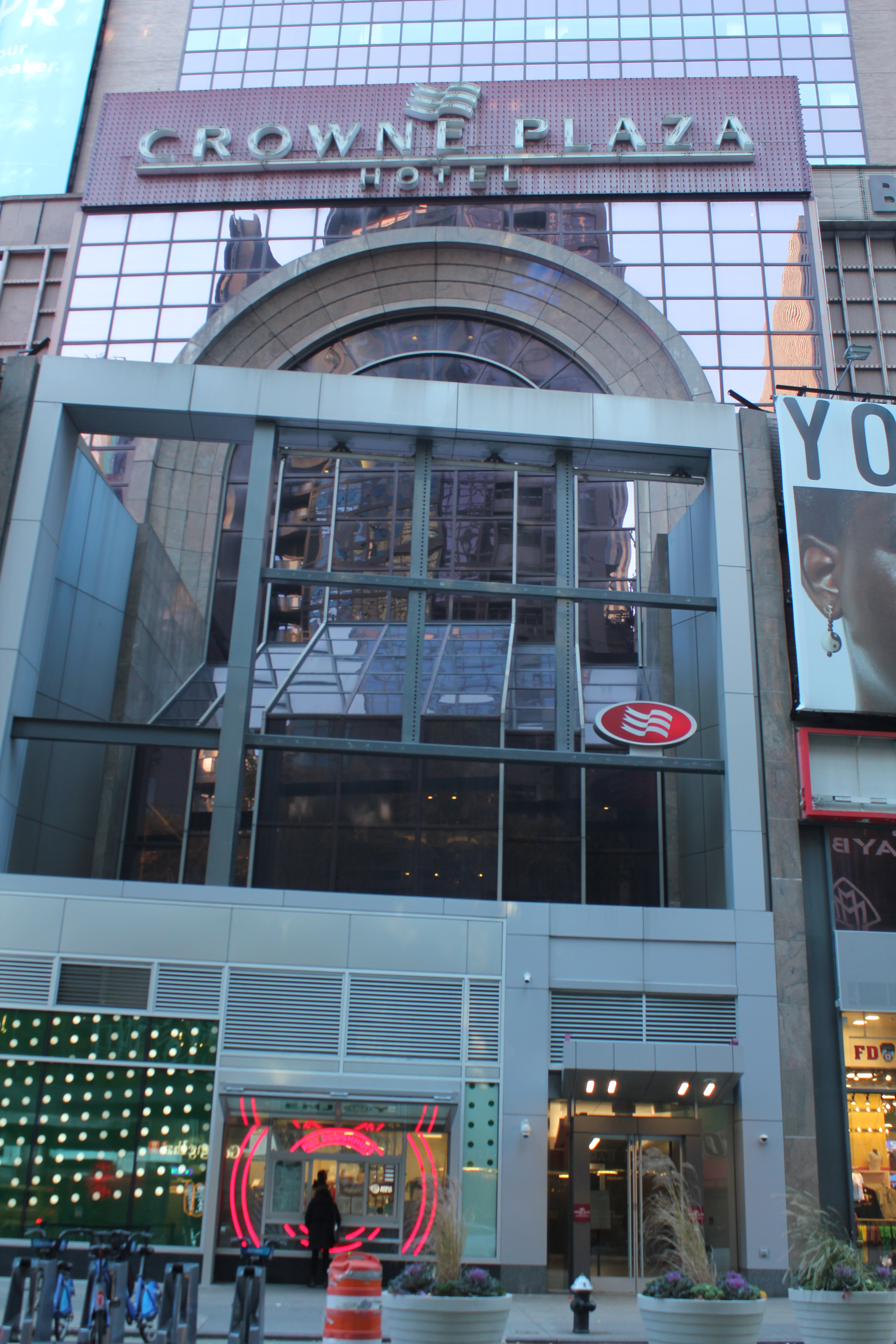
The main entrance arch

The block of Broadway between 48th and 49th Streets was owned by Michael Zaffarano, who for years resisted selling off his pornographic businesses, even as other landlords nearby were being cajoled to shutter their adult businesses. Zaffarano's son John inherited the sites in 1981 and was more agreeable to selling them after his father's death. Developer William Zeckendorf Jr. bought the sites in 1985 and planned to replace them with a hotel. The site had also been contemplated as a location for an office building. In August 1986, Zeckendorf announced plans for the hotel, to be designed by Alan Lapidus. The hotel was variously planned to be 44, 45, or 46 stories tall. At the time, the New York City Planning Commission (CPC) was considering enacting regulations that would have forced new buildings along Times Square's northern section to include bright signage as well as deep setbacks. Accordingly, Zeckendorf planned a hotel with five types of signs, including a horizontal zipper and five-story-high displays. Zeckendorf demolished the pornographic businesses in October 1986 and developed the hotel with several partners.

The Holiday Corporation (later Holiday Inn) agreed to operate the hotel in October 1986, and the hotel became known as the Holiday Inn Crowne Plaza Times Square. It was to be the Holiday Corporation's first hotel in Manhattan and would be the Holiday Inn Crowne Plaza chain's flagship. The hotel building was planned with 800,000 square feet (74,000 m^{2}) of space, of which about 200,000 square feet (19,000 m^{2}) would be reserved for offices. Zeckendorf received $227 million in financing for the hotel in August 1987, with the Bank of Nova Scotia providing the loan. The CPC approved a planning regulation that September, which required large new developments in Times Square to set aside about five percent of their space for "entertainment uses", such as broadcast studios or ground-floor stores. The ordinance also required the developers of such buildings to install large signs facing Times Square. The hotel's design was directly influenced by this ordinance.

When construction started in 1988, the Holiday Inn Crowne Plaza was one of four large new office projects being erected around Times Square, as well as the largest of four hotels being erected there. By that July, the hotel's superstructure was up to the fourth story. The Holiday Inn Crowne Plaza planned to charge a minimum of $175 per night for a single room, making it more expensive than its competitors nearby. Nonetheless, Holiday Inn projected that the hotel would be profitable because the company already had a large number of frequent guests and business clients. The hotel was primarily targeted toward domestic business travelers, followed by international business clients and then leisure visitors. As such, management planned to set aside 20 percent of its rooms for business clients, twice as much as in comparable hotels. By 1989, the number of annual visitors to New York City had decreased for the first time in eight years due to the effects of Black Monday. Nonetheless, the hotel's manager Michael Silberstein expressed optimism that the decline was temporary. Prior to the hotel's opening, Silberstein sent some of the hotel's employees to Walt Disney World for training, saying that "Disney gives top-level service".

=== Opening and early years ===
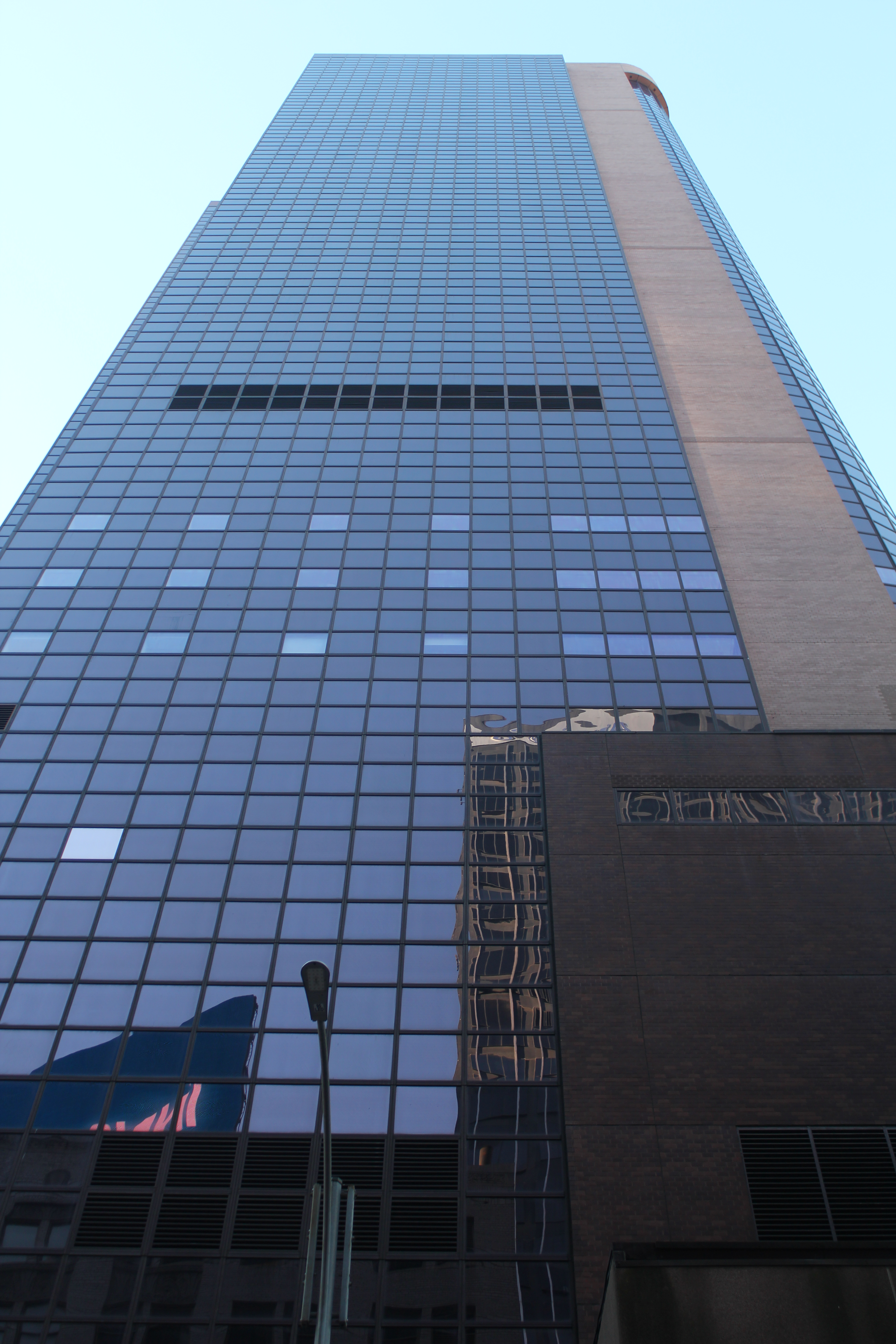
Seen from the ground on 48th Street

The Holiday Inn Crowne Plaza opened on December 1, 1989, at a cost of $300 million. For the hotel's construction, Zeckendorf had received a municipal tax abatement that lowered his tax bill by several million dollars. Only 200 rooms were completed at the time, but the hotel's operators wanted to uphold their promise of an "autumn 1989 launch". According to Silberstein, 129 guests made reservations for New Year's Eve in the first twelve hours of its operation, even though the hotel did not conduct any advertising. It was one of several new hotels in the Times Square area with a combined 4,200 rooms, even as visitation rates in the city remained sluggish. While the hotel was operated by Holiday Inn (then by Bass plc after early 1990), the building itself was owned by several partners. (Note: In a 1989 filing with the New York State Liquor Authority, the listed owners included Zeckendorf, Jason D. Carter, Arthur G. Cohen, Elie Hirschfeld, Frank Stanton, and Zev Wolfson, as well as KG Crowne and KG Crowne Associates.) A restaurant named Samplings Bar had opened in the hotel by April 1990, followed the next month by the Broadway Grill. The Holiday Inn Crowne Plaza was largely staffed by union workers, with the Broadway Grill being the only exception.

Several months after the hotel opened, Zeckendorf had not leased the office space at the hotel's base. Furthermore, there were no tenants for the signage, so parts of the exterior were covered up. The amenity space was expanded by one story in 1992. The same year, the Holiday Inn Crowne Plaza was selected to host delegates for the 1992 Democratic Party presidential primaries from Arkansas, the home state of Bill Clinton, who eventually won the 1992 United States presidential election. The "relatively unknown" hotel become more popular as a result. Holiday Inn Crowne Plaza hotels were rebranded as Crowne Plaza in 1994 and the hotel added a large sign on the southern wall in 1995, while the words "Holiday Inn" were removed from signage on the hotel's exterior. The hotel's office space had also remained empty until the same year, when the American Management Association indicated its intent to sign a 150,000-square-foot (14,000 m^{2}) lease there. The AMA was supposed to have been the original tenant of the space when the hotel was being developed. Among the advertisers on the Crowne Plaza's facade was the Poland Spring Corporation, which in 1998 signed a three-year lease for a curved billboard at 48th Street and Broadway.

The hotel also hosted events such as spirits expositions and media conventions. In addition, the Crowne Plaza was one of New York City's few hotels that accommodated sequestered jurors, as New York state law required jurors to remain sequestered during some types of criminal trials. The hotel's operators hired Adam Tihany to redesign the interior in 1999. The modifications included a renovation of the bar, which cost $2 million. The Crowne Plaza's manager, Drew Schlesinger, said the hotel's operators allowed management to refurbish the hotel "in tune with the whole gentrification of Times Square".

=== Early 21st century ===
The hotel saw decreases in visitation following the September 11 attacks in 2001. Around the same time, the area evolved into a business district and there was growing demand for meeting space, as well as numerous new restaurants. Consequently, the Crowne Plaza closed two of its restaurants and replaced them with a ballroom. The Hershey Company announced plans to open a ground-level store and add a 15-story billboard in 2002. The City Investment Fund, a joint venture between Morgan Stanley Real Estate and Fisher Brothers, acquired the Crowne Plaza in 2006 for $362 million. By then, rising room rates had led to decreases in visitation. Two years later, the hotel conducted an $85 million renovation on its lobby, restaurants, guest rooms, and meeting space. The renovation was conducted in stages, with the hotel remaining open throughout. The renovation was finished in 2009, and the Brasserie 1605 restaurant opened that April. After the renovation was completed, the Crowne Plaza saw a lower occupancy rate than other hotels, in part because of decreased tourism.

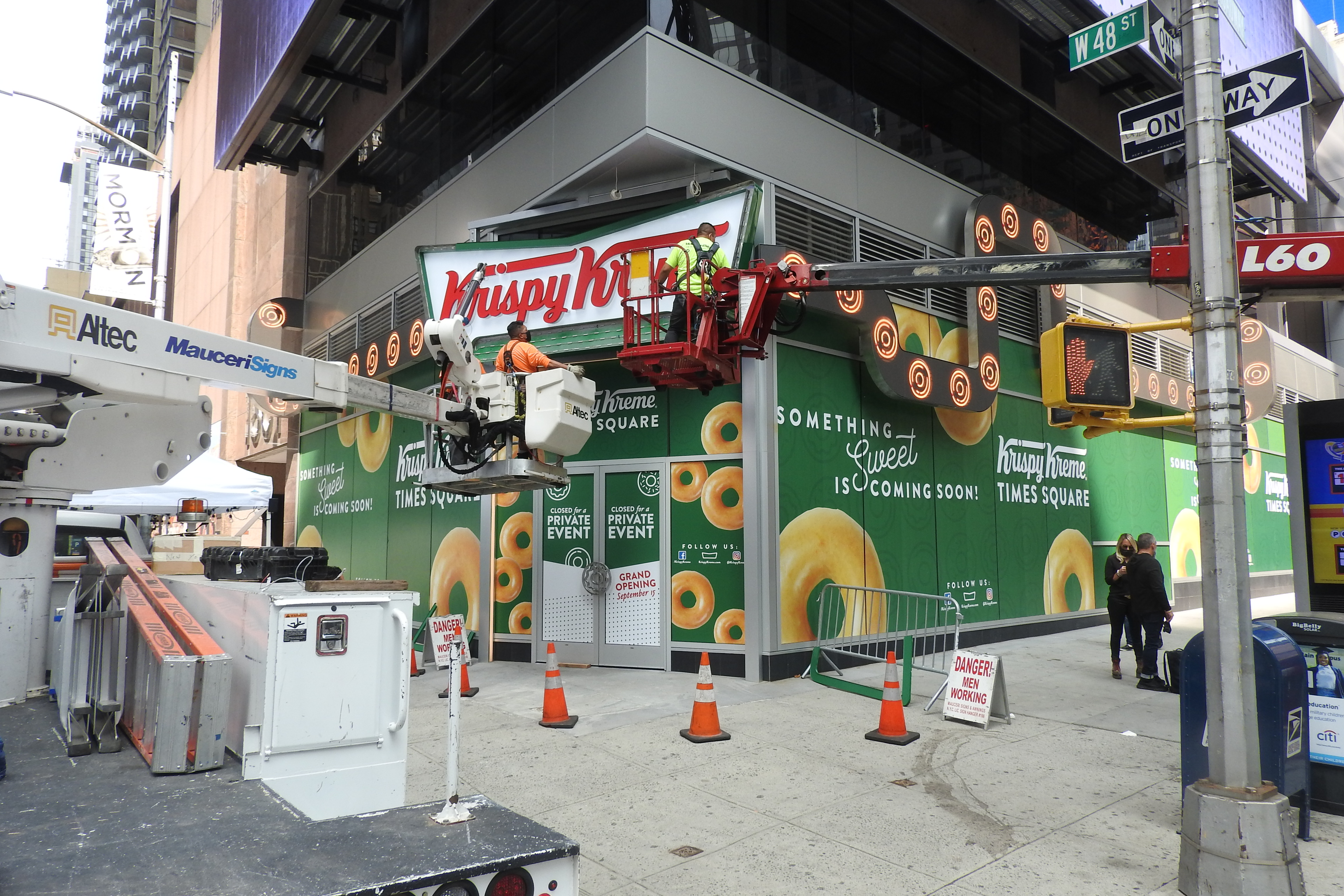
Krispy Kreme location

Vornado Realty Trust acquired the $34 million junior mortgage in May 2011 and paid down some of the debt that December. Vornado announced the next year that it would recapitalize the hotel and take over ownership of the 180,000 square feet (17,000 m^{2}) of commercial space. Vornado bought City Investment Fund's ownership stake for $39 million in 2015, increasing Vornado's ownership stake from 11 to 33 percent. Vornado then acquired majority ownership by buying another 24-percent ownership stake for $95 million. Vornado sued Holiday Hospitality in July 2016 for $30 million, alleging that Holiday had run the hotel poorly. In April 2018, Vornado refinanced the hotel with a $250 million loan from Deutsche Bank and Morgan Stanley. The next year, Krispy Kreme Doughnuts began building a store in the retail space, which opened in September 2020. The Harrison, a restaurant by the BenMoha Group, was also announced for the hotel in 2019.

=== Financial issues and Hyatt conversion ===
The Crowne Plaza shuttered in March 2020 due to the COVID-19 pandemic in New York City, and Vornado stopped paying rent on the ground lease. By that June, Vornado had gone into default on $330 million of debt. The senior debt was placed for sale, and Argent Ventures bought the $195 million senior mortgage that December for $90 million. The Crowne Plaza remained closed because it was in foreclosure. In September 2021, SL Green Realty bought a portion of the hotel site for $121 million from the Walber Broadway Company, which had owned that portion of the site since 1987. Vornado, which wanted to sell its stake to Penson, claimed that the purchase violated its right of first refusal and sued SL Green. A New York state judge ruled in April 2022 that SL Green had to sell its stake to Penson.

The hotel reopened in November 2022, and its owners filed for Chapter 11 bankruptcy protection the next month. In February 2023, a bankruptcy judge allowed the hotel's legal owner, Times Square JV LLC (controlled by Vornado), to have its creditors vote on whether the hotel should be sold or restructured. In August 2024, the investor Michael Loeb bought a 16% stake in the hotel from Argent. The hotel closed around January 2025 for renovations and reopened on July 15, 2025, as the Hyatt Regency Times Square.

== Reception ==
When the hotel was completed, Anne Kates of USA Today wrote that the "sense of adventure" in Lapidus's design had received mixed reception. Jerry Adler of Newsweek wrote in 1989 that the hotel "may be the most gorgeous building in all Manhattan". Inside the hotel, New York Times critic Terry Trucco wrote that the interior was "pleasingly anonymous, done in the pale colors and bland furnishings seen in big American hotels from coast to coast", though she found her 44th-story hotel room to be cramped.

Paul Goldberger of The New York Times felt that the signs were more prominent than the building, saying that "it looks vastly better at night, when it is ablaze with neon, than it does during the day, when it seems only like a failed effort at elegance". Goldberger further elaborated his dissent in a 1992 article, saying the facade "has ugly, unfinished brick waiting for a sign that may not come for years, a glaring offense at the pedestrian." Eve M. Kahn of The Wall Street Journal described the Holiday Inn Crowne Plaza as a "glitzy pink-granite-and-burgundy-glass jukebox" that sharply contrasted with the "restrained" design of 1585 Broadway. Architect Robert A. M. Stern said that he would "prefer to say nothing" of the hotel, the only Lapidus design that Stern had experienced firsthand.

== See also ==
- List of buildings and structures on Broadway in Manhattan
- List of hotels in New York City
