= Pappajohn Business Building =

Coordinates: 41°39′47″N 91°32′6″W

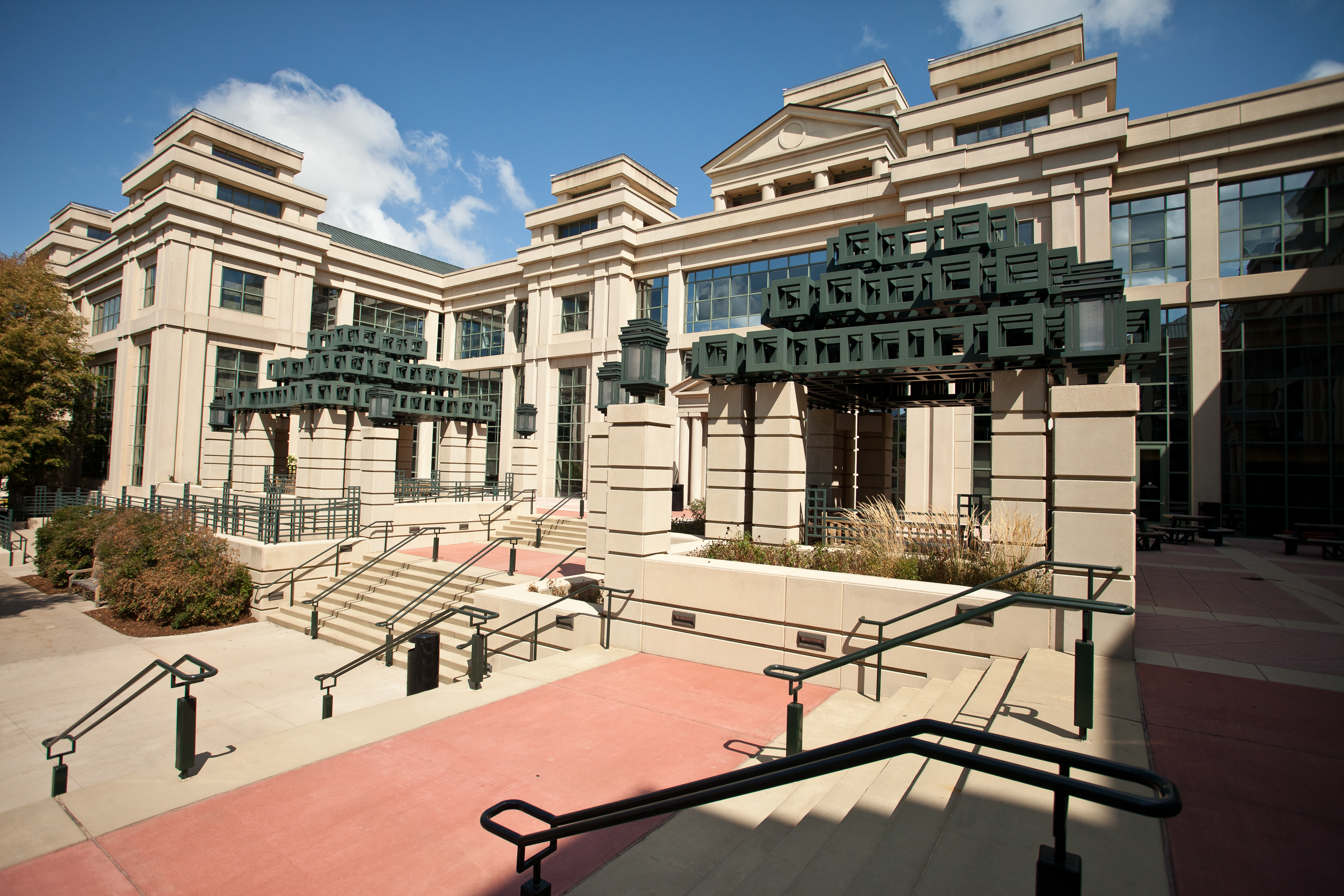
Pappajohn Business Building in 2012

The Pappajohn Business Building houses the Tippie College of Business at the University of Iowa in Iowa City, Iowa. Completed in 1994, it is home to the Pappajohn Entrepreneurial Center and Small Business Center.

The 187,000-square-foot (17,400 m^{2}) postmodern building embodies the style of the Pentacrest structures with its use of aggregate stone and is a modern twist on the turn-of-the century buildings found at the heart of campus. Its style is also reminiscent of financial institutions such as the New York Stock Exchange and its use of a "money-green" paint scheme reinforces its financial focus.

The building includes 27 classrooms varying in size from a 16-seat conference room to a 387-seat auditorium. Each classroom is equipped with technology including projectors and audio systems. The building also houses one of the largest information technology centers on campus. The open atrium spaces, study corners and outdoor patio provide places for students to study or relax.

The Pappajohn Business Building is named after John Pappajohn, a Des Moines venture capitalist and UI alumnus. His $4 million contribution to the building fund was one of the largest the University had ever received. To commemorate his contribution, the University of Iowa bestowed his name upon the building. This was not the only funding provided for the $34 million building; in 1991 the Iowa General Assembly approved $24 million in state revenue bonds to help offset the cost of the building project. Upon dedication, alumnus John Pappajohn was quoted as saying "Pappa's in the house."
