= Elie Hirschfeld =

American businessman (born 1949)

- Born: December 25, 1949 (age 76)
- Education: Brown University (B.A., 1971); New York University Law School (J.D., 1974)
- Spouses: Dale J. Cahan (m. 1975; div. 1979) Marcia Riklis (m. 1980–1996) Susan Hirschfeld (m. 1996; div. 2010) Sarah J. Schlesinger (m. 2011)
- Parent(s): Abraham Hirschfeld; Zipora Teicher Hirschfeld

Elie Hirschfeld (born December 25, 1949) is an American real estate developer, philanthropist and art collector based in New York City. He is the son of the late real estate mogul Abraham Hirschfeld.

== Career ==
Elie Hirschfeld started his career as a real estate attorney at Milbank Tweed Hadley & McCloy. The son of New York real estate mogul Abraham Hirschfeld, Hirschfeld has developed properties such as the Grand Sutton, the Hotel Pennsylvania, the Crowne Plaza Hotel, Park Avenue Court, Sports Club LA Building, Manhattan Mall at Herald Square, the Gotham and Exchange Tower.

Through Hirschfeld Properties, Elie Hirschfeld owns a portfolio of apartments and hotels, as well as commercial and industrial properties

One of Hirschfeld's properties, an East Hampton estate which is worth an estimated $32.5 million, was frequently leased as a summer residence by Bill and Hillary Clinton.

In 2014, Hirschfeld completed the fourth-largest Manhattan office leasing deal of the year, as ranked by square footage. The agreement with the U.S. Drug Enforcement Administration renewed the deal on 570,000 square feet of space in W. Chelsea.

In 2015, Hirschfeld purchased a Westhampton Beach mansion for $14 million, which the developer plans to use as investment property. It is marketed as a summer rental.

In September 2016, Hirschfeld bought a 40-unit mixed retail and residential building in the Yorkville area for $23 million. This 21,640 square foot Upper East Side property adds to Hirschfeld's substantial portfolio of residential units in NYC. Hirschfeld also acquired a 7,058 square foot condominium unit, a triplex penthouse in the Marquand building, for $37.5 million as an investment property.

Hirschfeld was featured in the 'NYC Titans of Business' panel discussion at the 2017 Luxury Real Estate Summit at New York City's CORE Club on April 28, 2017, moderated by Peter Grant of The Wall Street Journal, and Jennifer Gould Keil of the New York Post. Hirschfeld provided insights on the city's luxury real estate rental and buyers' market, and spoke about his many real estate development projects and his successful past partnership with his friend, President Donald Trump.

== Philanthropy and arts ==
Hirschfeld created the Hirschfeld Foundation in support of education, healthcare, athletics and Jewish causes. He serves as trustee emeritus of Brown University and Long Island University, director of the United States board of the Weizmann Institute of Science, and trustee of numerous New York City hospitals. He has served on the board of directors and steering committees of several organizations, including the Jewish National Fund and the U.S. Commission for the Preservation of America's Heritage Abroad.

In 2011, Hirschfeld donated an additional $125,000 to Brown University, at that time making his total gift to his alma mater $1 million. In 2016, Hirschfeld and his wife Sarah again gave to Brown University, with a $3.5 million donation to renovate and maintain the Judaic Studies building. Brown University renamed the building the "Hirschfeld House." The renovation of this 108 year old historic structure will help improve and ensure the viability of the Judaic Studies program long term.

Hirschfeld and his wife received the 2016 Patrons of Education Award from New York's Park East Synagogue.

In February 2017, Sarah and Elie Hirschfeld were honored by Israel Bonds with the Israel69 Award. They attended the awards celebration dinner at the Fontainebleau Miami Beach hosted by actor Jason Alexander, along with other award recipients from the United States, Canada and Mexico.

Hirschfeld announced in March 2017, that the Keith Haring original work entitled, Radiant Baby, was acquired and added to the Elie and Sarah Hirschfeld Art Collection. "Keith Haring unifies many layers of New York City's culture – both the refined and gritty, the cultivated, edified and self-taught. The energy carried through his artwork is unmatched. Sarah and I will always treasure the work of Keith Haring that we recently added to our collection," he said.

In September 2019, President Trump appointed Hirschfeld to the United Commission for the Preservation of America's Heritage Abroad.

== Personal ==
Hirschfeld is a 1971 graduate of Brown University. He studied at the London School of Economics and then graduated from New York University Law School in 1974. He is a trustee emeritus of Brown University.

Hirschfeld has completed over 100 triathlons, marathons and other endurance events including the 2012 New York City Ironman Triathlon at age 62. He placed fourth in his age group at the AJ Bell London Triathlon.

Hirschfeld's wife, Sarah J. Schlesinger, is a physician, researcher and associate professor of clinical investigation at Rockefeller University. Schlesinger was part of a team of researchers at Rockefeller University whose work on Antibody 10–1074, showing encouraging clinical results to prevent or treat HIV, was published in the medical journal, Nature Medicine, on January 16, 2017.
