= CIMBA =

Study abroad program in Italy

The CIMBA campus, located in Paderno del Grappa, Italy

CIMBA Italy (Consortium Institute of Management and Business Analysis) is a study abroad program in Italy that offers study abroad and degrees for undergraduate, MBA, and Executive-level students. Coursework focuses on American-style learning in business, leadership, journalism, communication, and engineering. CIMBA has a campus in Paderno del Grappa in the Veneto region of northern Italy.

The Tippie College of Business, located at the University of Iowa (UI) in Iowa City, Iowa, USA, is the current degree and credit-granting institution for the program.

== Partner universities ==
CIMBA works with both the consortium member and non-member universities. This consortium, led by the University of Iowa (UI), comprises more than thirty-five U.S. universities (all Carnegie Foundation research universities), who collectively provide support and guidance for CIMBA's academic programs. Students and faculty come primarily from these partner schools:

University of Alabama	University of Iowa	Purdue University	Furman University
University of Arizona	Iowa State University	Rutgers University	Christopher Newport University
University of Arkansas	Kansas State University	San Diego State University
Brigham Young University	University of Kansas	University of South Carolina
Clemson University	Louisiana State University	University of Tennessee
University of Colorado	University of Michigan	Texas Tech University
University of Connecticut	University of Minnesota	University of Virginia
University of Delaware	University of Missouri	Virginia Tech University
Florida State University	North Carolina State University	Western Michigan University
University of Florida	University of Nebraska–Lincoln	West Virginia University
Georgia State University	Oklahoma State University	University of Wyoming
University of Georgia	University of Oklahoma	University of Wisconsin–Madison

== History ==
In 1985, the Consortium of Universities for International Studies (CUIS) was formed as a non-profit organization with the goal of providing international experience to business professors. A few years later, the university consortium created the business institute called CIMBA. In 1991, Clemson University became the degree-granting institution and graduated the first MBA class. In the mid-1990s, CUIS began its summer graduate study abroad program and created offerings for undergraduate students. CUIS began to offer study abroad programs for graduate students in 1997. In 1999, the University of Kansas became the degree-granting university for CUIS. The following year, CUIS offered its first semester-long program for undergraduate students and then later began to offer journalism and communication courses to undergraduate students. In 2008, The University of Iowa became the new credit-granting institution for CUIS, and CIMBA still offers courses through the UI's Tippie College of Business, College of Engineering, and College of Liberal Arts & Sciences. The classes offered by the program are taught by professors from the partner universities. The program has nearly 10,000 alumni living and working in 44 countries, including more than 1,200 MBA alumni.

== Academics ==
CIMBA Italy offers undergraduate, graduate, and executive programs that are provided at the CIMBA residential campus in Paderno del Grappa. Courses are taught in English, and vary between semester and summer programs. The CIMBA study abroad and MBA programs are backed by the AACSB-accredited UI's Tippie College of Business.

=== Undergraduate program ===
Undergraduate semester and summer programs are offered in Paderno del Grappa, Italy.

Most of the courses are targeted towards business students and emphasize current international events. CIMBA also offers courses in economics, journalism, communications, beginning Italian, music, engineering, and others. Students can earn up to 18 semester hours for the semester and summer session students can receive up to 6 semester hours. Students are encouraged to participate in executive lectures and travel opportunities.

=== Graduate and executive programs ===
Graduate semester and summer programs, as well as executive education programs, are offered in Paderno del Grappa, Italy.

The CIMBA MBA program focuses on neuroscience leadership research and is also accredited through UI's Tippie College of Business. Courses are taught in English by a variety of professors from across the United States and world with the goal of participants graduating in 1–2 years.

=== Leadership Institute ===
Established by CIMBA founder, Al Ringleb, the Leadership Institute is based on more than 25 years of scientific research in neuroscience and social psychology. Ringleb and CIMBA Executive Director Cristina Turchet joined forces with Kepner-Tregoe, a multinational company specializing in problem solving strategies, to create this science-based curriculum. CIMBA's program focuses on giving students, managers, executives, and up-and-coming leaders concrete steps to improve skills related to decision-making, problem solving, self and social awareness, self-regulation, management, consulting, and training.

CIMBA offers a three-day, performance-based program that develops student's leadership skills by allowing them to practice in front of their peers. Through personal growth assessments, participants learn their strengths, and area of improvements as well as their working style with other peers.

The institute's mission is to help people develop skills to turn ideas into practical innovations, to effectively manage and lead others to higher levels of performance, and to become more confident in their abilities to overcome the most demanding challenges. The Leadership Institute is instrumental in supporting CIMBA's educational philosophy which includes three pillars of learning: knowledge, rational process, and leadership behavior.

== About the campus ==
The CIMBA campus is based in Paderno del Grappa, in the Veneto region of Northern Italy, at the base of Mount Grappa of the Italian Alps. The campus is located at the Istituti Filippin, an Italian boarding school, which is shared between the CIMBA program students and the Italian students. The Veneto region is home to a business community that boasts more than 450,000 companies. CIMBA collaborates with the local businesses and the community. For example, companies in Italy's entrepreneurial Veneto region (e.g., Benetton, Nordica, and Zanussi) work in partnership with CIMBA to provide MBA students with real-world Management consulting and Six Sigma projects.
