= Julianne Smith =

American foreign policy advisor and diplomat

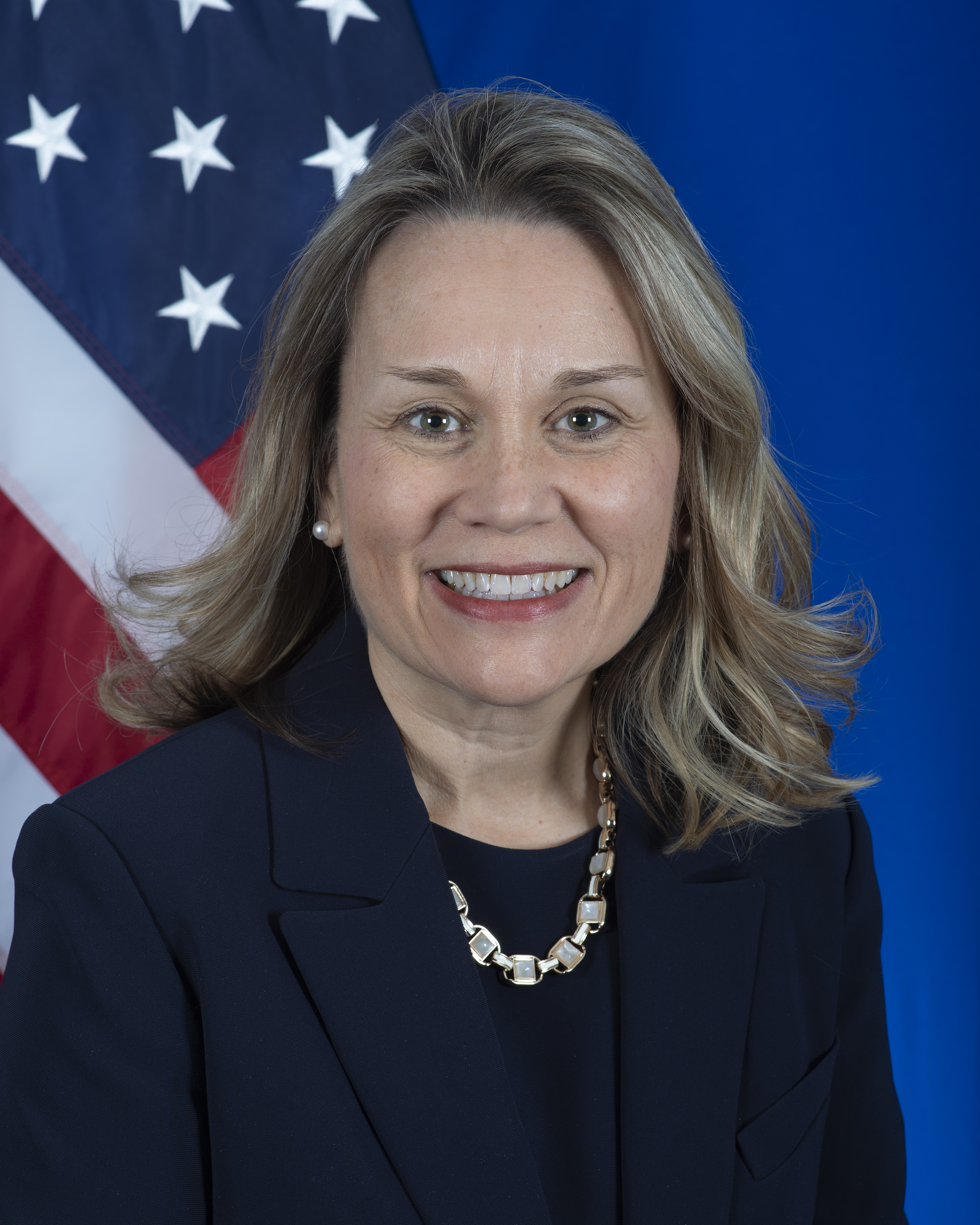

25th United States Ambassador to NATO
- In office December 6, 2021 – October 23, 2024
- President: Joe Biden
- Preceded by: Kay Bailey Hutchison
- Succeeded by: Matthew Whitaker

Personal details
- Born: 1970 (age 55–56)
- Children: 2
- Education: Xavier University (BA); American University (MA)

Julianne Smith is an American foreign policy advisor and former diplomat who served as the United States Permanent Representative to NATO in the Biden administration from 2021 until 2024. She previously served as deputy national security advisor to then-Vice President Biden in the Obama administration.

== Education ==
Smith earned a Bachelor of Arts in communications and French from Xavier University and a Master of Arts in international relations from American University. She also studied French at Paris-Sorbonne University for a year and German at LMU Munich for one year.

== Career ==
=== NGO experience ===
From 2000 to 2003, Smith worked as a program officer at the German Marshall Fund. She then joined the Center for Strategic and International Studies as a senior fellow, where among other accomplishments in November 2006 she edited Transforming NATO (...again) - A Primer for the NATO Summit in Riga 2006, and in 2008 she published The NATO-Russia Relationship: Defining Moment or Déjà Vu?.

=== Obama administration ===
From 2009 to 2012, she served as the director of European and NATO policy at the United States Department of Defense, where she co-wrote the 2010 NATO Strategic Concept document, under Secretary Robert Gates and Secretary of State Hillary Clinton.

From April 2012 to June 2013, she served as deputy national security advisor to then-Vice President Joe Biden.

=== Later NGO experience ===
From 2014 to 2018, she worked at the Center for a New American Security. She was also a fellow at the Robert Bosch Stiftung for one year. A senior advisor post at WestExec Advisors followed the consultancy's formation in 2017.

Smith co-founded the Leadership Council for Women in National Security, which officially launched on 25 June 2019.

She worked as an advisor to a German consultancy called Berlin Global Advisors and worked at the American Academy in Berlin, while she penned such essays in foreign policy magazines as "NATO in the Age of Trump".

A 2021 investigation in The American Prospect found that Smith, "who listed Boeing and SoftBank as clients, earned $34,000 as a WestExec consultant while holding down a full-time role at the think tank German Marshall Fund."

=== Biden administration ===
In January 2021, Smith became a senior advisor to the United States secretary of state.

==== Representative to NATO ====
On June 15, 2021, President Joe Biden nominated Smith to serve as the United States permanent representative to NATO. On September 15, 2021, a hearing on her nomination was held before the Senate Foreign Relations Committee. On October 19, 2021, her nomination was reported favorably out of committee. Her nomination was confirmed by United States Senate on November 18, 2021 by voice vote.

== Punditry career ==
Smith has written op-ed columns for The New York Times, Lawfare, Washington Monthly, Foreign Affairs, and The National Interest. She has also appeared on NPR programs, including 1A, All Things Considered, and Morning Edition.

== Personal life ==
Smith speaks German and French. She and her husband have two sons.

== Honors and awards ==
=== International honors ===
- Sweden:
  - Commander First Class of the Order of the Polar Star (2024)

Diplomatic posts
Preceded by Kay Bailey Hutchison	United States Ambassador to NATO; 2021–2024	Succeeded by Matthew Whitaker
