= Unemployment Insurance Tax System =

Unemployment Insurance Tax System, or UITS, refers to an online application created by Iowa Workforce Development in 2007 to allow employer's to submit quarterly unemployment insurance tax reports online.
