= Abraham Hirschfeld =

American real estate investor

- Born: Abraham Jacob Hirschfeld; December 20, 1919; Tarnów, Poland
- Died: August 9, 2005 (aged 85); The Bronx, New York, U.S.
- Occupation: Real estate investor
- Spouse: Zipora Teicher Hirschfeld
- Children: Rachel Hirschfeld; Elie Hirschfeld

Abraham Jacob Hirschfeld (December 20, 1919 – August 9, 2005) was an American real estate investor, Broadway producer and political candidate from New York City. He was the owner of several buildings in Manhattan. He served as treasurer for the New York State Democratic Committee in the 1960s and as city commissioner of Miami Beach, Florida, in 1989.

== Early life ==
Abraham Jacob Hirschfeld was born on December 20, 1919, in Tarnów, Poland. He immigrated to the British Mandate of Palestine in the early 1930s. He said most of his extended family remained behind and were murdered in the Holocaust. Hirschfeld moved to the United States in 1950. His brother, Menashe Hirschfeld, moved to Montreal, Quebec, Canada.

== Business career ==
Hirschfeld made his fortune building semi-enclosed "open-air" parking garages.

Hirschfeld became the owner of the Vertical Club, a health club on the Upper East Side. He was a co-owner of the Hotel Pennsylvania. Additionally, he was an investor in the Crowne Plaza Hotel, Times Square.

In 1989, he funded the Broadway show Prince of Central Park and the Jackie Mason show, Love Thy Neighbor.

In March 1993, Hirschfeld was the court-appointed manager of New York Post for two weeks after the paper filed for bankruptcy. During that period of time, he dismissed editor Pete Hamill, but later upon court order reinstated him and was shown kissing his face in a famous picture. After his New York Post failure, he founded Open Air PM.

== Political career ==
Throughout his career, Hirschfeld ran for political office several times, including unsuccessful bids as "Honest Abe" for the U.S. Senate in 1974 (defeated in Democratic primary), for New York City Council President in 1977, for Manhattan Borough President in 1997, for Lieutenant Governor of New York, for New York State Comptroller in 1998, and for Mayor of Miami Beach, Florida.

Hirschfeld served as treasurer for the New York State Democratic Committee in the 1960s and was elected to the City Commission of Miami Beach in 1989. In 1990, the Miami Beach City Commission censured its colleague Hirschfeld for spitting twice on a Miami Herald reporter, and censured him again in 1991 for telling an ethnic joke at a commission meeting.

In September 1987, Hirschfeld launched an unsuccessful campaign in Miami Beach to draft New York developer Donald Trump for president.

In 2004, Hirschfeld ran as a third-party candidate for the U.S. Senate from New York against Charles Schumer; Schumer won 71% of the vote, Hirschfeld garnered less than 1%.

== Lawsuits ==
In 1998, Hirschfeld offered US$1.0 million (equivalent to $2.0 million in 2025) to Paula Jones to drop her sexual harassment lawsuit against former US President Bill Clinton.

In 1999, Hirschfeld was cleared of charges he owed $3.3 million (equivalent to $6.4 million in 2025) in taxes.

In 2000, Hirschfeld was indicted of criminal solicitation for trying to hire a hit man to kill his former business partner Stanley Stahl, with whom he had a "survivor take all" business partnership. Hirschfeld was sentenced to three years in prison, of which he served two. When he got out of prison he ran for the U.S. Senate, calling himself "Honest Abe".

== Personal life ==
Hirschfeld married Zipora Teicher Hirschfeld in 1943. They had a son, Elie Hirschfeld, and a daughter, Rachel Hirschfeld.

== Death and legacy ==
Hirschfeld died at age 85 on August 9, 2005, at the St. Barnabas Hospital in The Bronx, of cardiac arrest stemming from complications of a battle with terminal cancer. In 2013, his daughter accused her brother of stealing US$300 million from the estate.
