= Pet trust =

Legal agreement for care of pet after owner's death

A pet trust is a legal arrangement to provide care for a pet after its owner dies. A pet trust falls under trust law and is one option for pet owners who want to provide for their pets after they pass away. Alternatives include honorary bequests made through a will and contractual arrangements with the caregiver.

Pet trusts stipulate that in the event of a grantor's disability or death, a trustee will hold property (cash, for example) “in trust” for the benefit of the grantor's pets. The “grantor” (also called a settlor or trustor in some states) is the person who creates the trust, which may take effect during a person's lifetime or at death. Payments to designated caregivers will be made regularly.

== History ==
The development of pet trusts is part of the animal rights movement.

== United States ==
All U.S. states have passed laws that allow some form of pet trust. Some states allow a pet trust to continue for the life of the pet, without regard to a maximum duration of 21 years. This is particularly advantageous for companion animals who have longer life expectancies than cats and dogs, such as horses and parrots.

Examples of significant pet trusts include:

- Trouble: A dog that was owned by Leona Helmsley, to which she bequeathed $12 million in a will that disinherited her two grandchildren. A judge later amended the amount down to $2 million.
- Lulu: An 8-year-old Border Collie inherited $5 million through her owner's will in 2021.
- Blackie: Considered the richest cat by Guinness World Records until 2018, inherited a $12.5 million fortune.

== See also ==
- List of individual cats
- List of individual dogs
- List of individual apes
- List of wealthiest families
- Rachel Hirschfeld
