= Robert Mickle =

City planner (1925–2009)

- Born: Robert W. Mickle; 4 October 1926; Boone, Iowa, U.S.
- Died: 1 March 2009 (aged 82); Des Moines, Iowa, U.S.
- Resting place: Linwood Park Cemetery
- Other names: Bob
- Occupations: City planner; community leader; activist

Robert W. "Bob" Mickle (12 February 1925 – 1 March 2009) was an American city planner, community leader, and activist from Des Moines, Iowa. He was active in his planning career for nearly 40 years. His lifelong commitment to community activism and volunteerism, is recognized to have had a lasting impact on the city of Des Moines. Among his accomplishments are the founding of the Des Moines Area Metropolitan Planning Organization, construction oversight of Des Moines' "Skywalks" footbridge system, and the Mickle Center.

Mickle was the founding director of the Central Iowa Regional Planning Commission. He served as head of the commission from its creation in the mid-60s until 1972, when its rapid growth necessitated a redistribution of responsibility. Mickle continued to serve as director of planning, while the executive director position was given to Joel Gunnells.

== The Mickle Center ==
Robert Mickle Business and Neighborhood Resource Center, locally known as "the Mickle Center," is both the name of an organization and the building it operates in. The center was named after Robert Mickle for his contributions to Des Moines. Originally a senior center, the building was trusted to Mickle for $1 by the City of Des Moines on the condition that the organization would operate as a nonprofit. The building was subsequently renovated under Mickle's direction. Its newly renovated facility included office spaces, meeting rooms, and a community room. The center, officially registered as "Neighborhood Investment Corporation", has served the Sherman Hill neighborhood and the greater Des Moines community as a 501(c)(3) nonprofit organization for several years. It functions as a shelter for many charitable organizations and a venue for various social activities. As of December 2019, the president of the center is Jack Porter.
