= Tippie College of Business =

Business school at the University of Iowa in Iowa City, Iowa

Coordinates: 41.6633°N 91.5349°W

- Type: Undergraduate & Graduate business school
- Established: 1921
- Parent institution: University of Iowa
- Dean: Amy Kristof-Brown
- Students: 4,700+ from BBA to PhD
- Location: 108 John Pappajohn Business Building; Iowa City, IA 52242, Iowa City, Iowa, US
- Campus: Urban
- Accreditation: AACSB
- Nickname: Tippie
- Website: tippie.uiowa.edu

The Tippie College of Business, also known as Tippie, is the business school located at the University of Iowa in Iowa City, Iowa. Established as the College of Commerce in 1921, Tippie is one of the oldest and highest-ranked business schools in the United States. The college is named after 1949 graduate Henry B. Tippie, marking the first academic division at the University of Iowa to be named after an alumnus. The college is located in the Pappajohn Business Building, which is named after 1952 graduate Des Moines venture capitalist John Pappajohn. Since 1923, the college has held the gold standard of accreditation, the Association to Advance Collegiate Schools of Business (AACSB). Today, with over 50,000 alumni and 4,700 students in programs spanning from BBAs to PhDs; the college houses six academic departments, 12 centers and institutes, and four student-managed endowment funds.

== History ==
Isaac Althaus Loos shaped the early beginnings of the college by establishing the School of Political and Social Science, which included degrees in commerce, economics and finance. In 1908, "Commerce" was added to the school name, which then featured nearly 40 courses. In 1921, the College of Commerce was born, enrolling approximately 100 students with 23 faculty members. Two years later, the college joined the Association to Advance Collegiate Schools of Business (AACSB).

In the 1950s, the college was reorganized into six departments and renamed the College of Business Administration. In 1994, the college moved to its present location, the Pappajohn Business Building, at the corner of Clinton and Market Street.

In 2008, Tippie became the new home for the Consortium Institute for Management and Business Analysis (CIMBA). In a university news article, the dean said, "We are delighted that we have the opportunity to broaden the global footprint of the Tippie College of Business and the University of Iowa".

In 2017, after falling 19 spots in one year in U.S. World News & Report's full-time MBA program ranking, Tippie began phasing out its full-time MBA program, with the final class graduated in 2019. Part-time MBA programs are still offered at the Iowa City campus, as well as in Des Moines, Cedar Rapids, and Italy.

In October 2019, Dean Sarah Fisher Gardial was named dean of Belmont University Massey College of Business, effective March 1, 2020. In November 2019 Amy Kristof-Brown was named interim dean of Tippie. In November 2020 Amy Kristof-Brown was named dean of Tippie.

== Academic programs ==
The Tippie College of Business offers Bachelor of Business Administration (BBA) degrees in six areas: accounting, business analytics and information systems (BAIS), economics, finance, management, and marketing. Students may also earn certificates in Business Analytics, Entrepreneurial Management, International Business, and Risk Management and Insurance. In 2021, Tippie's Department of Business Analytics was awarded the UPS George D. Smith Prize, which “recognizes excellence in preparing students to become practitioners of operations research and analytics.”

The college offers graduate programs, including a Master of Accountancy (MAc), Master of Science in Finance, full-time and part-time Master of Science in Business Analytics (MSBA), and multiple Ph.D. degree programs. Tippie offers two MBA programs including the Iowa MBA program that is offered online and in Cedar Rapids and Des Moines, and a 16-month Executive MBA program (EMBA) offered in Iowa City and Des Moines. The college also offers an international MBA program through CIMBA, in Italy.

The undergraduate program features a dedicated career services center, the Pomerantz Career Center, and the Frank Business Communications Center. Over 30 undergraduate organizations include Alpha Kappa Psi, Delta Sigma Pi, and the American Marketing Association. Honors students may join one of the oldest chapters of the business honorary society, Beta Gamma Sigma, established in 1921, as well as Beta Alpha Psi, an honorary accounting organization.

== Centers and institutes ==
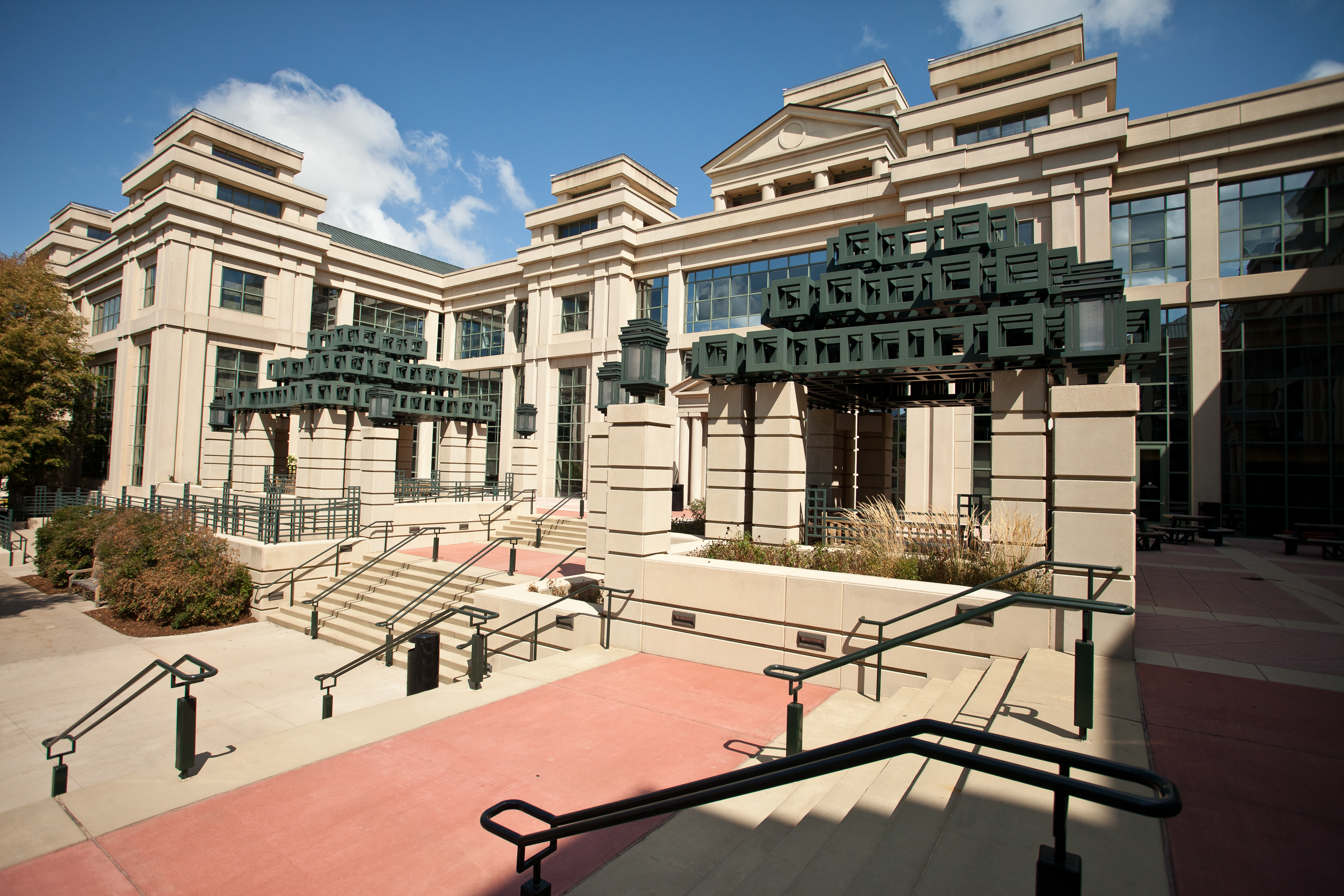
Tippie College of Business in the Pappajohn Business Building, Iowa City

- Hawkinson Institute of Business Finance – investment banking program.
- Institute for International Business – global business research, education, training and consulting programs.
- Jacobson Institute – educator development, STEM Innovator and BizInnovator curricula, competitions and summer programming.
- John Pappajohn Entrepreneurial Center (JPEC) – free consulting help; seed money for student start-ups.
- Frank Business Communication Center – writing, design, and speaking skills center.
- Marketing Institute – coordinates student participation in local client projects.
- Small Business Development Center – community courses, business counseling, and training for local entrepreneurs.
- Emmett J. Vaughan Institute of Risk Management and Insurance – corporate risk management and insurance studies.
- Tippie Analytics Cooperative – partners businesses with Analytics students to devise business solutions..
- Tippie Leadership Collaborative (TLC) – custom executive education, student leadership development..
- Iowa Electronic Markets Institute (IEM) – research and teaching futures market; known for accuracy in predicting election outcomes.
- RSM Institute – Accounting research and programming; promotes the research of Iowa faculty.
- Experimental Economics Interdisciplinary Research Group (EEIR) – interdisciplinary researchers providing an umbrella protocol and a common subject pool for research using experimental economics and the common experimental research method of real money payments to incentivize behavior in economic situations.

== Student organizations ==
=== Honor societies ===
- Tippie Business Honor Society – honor society for business students whose University of Iowa GPA places them in the top 10 percent of students enrolled in Tippie
- Sigma Nu Tau – entrepreneurial honors society recruiting students in junior status or higher with a minimum GPA of 3.2

=== Accounting and finance organizations ===
- Accounting Club – peer-to-peer organization for students exploring a future in accounting
- Beta Alpha Psi – international honorary organization for financial information professionals, with peer-to-peer accountancy tutoring
- Financial Management Association – student finance club
- Gamma Iota Sigma – international business fraternity for students interested in insurance, risk management, and actuarial science industries
- HawkTrade – stock investment club
- InvestHer – women's finance club
- Tippie Real Estate Club – organization for students considering real estate as a career
- Investment Banking Club – organization for students considering pursuing investment banking as a career

=== Analytics and technology organizations ===
- Tippie Technology and Innovation Association – Computer Science, Informatics, and Business Analytics and Information Systems (BAIS) student organization

=== Marketing, management and entrepreneurship organizations ===
- American Advertising Federation – student-run advertising agency which works on projects for local businesses
- American Marketing Association – organization that connects students with marketing professionals in the community
- Enactus at Iowa – international organization where students create entrepreneurial-based projects to work on in the global community
- I-Envision – creative entrepreneurship club
- National Retail Federation – organization for students entering the fields of retailing and retail marketing
- Society for Human Resource Management – organization for students interested in learning about human resources or management roles

=== Service organizations ===
- Business Student Ambassadors – organization where students work as ambassadors for the college
- Moneythink – provides financial literacy education to high school students in the community
- Net Impact – organization to empower youth to drive social and environmental change throughout the Hawkeye community
- Tippie Senate – advisory board of undergraduate students elected by the student body to work with the Undergraduate Program Office
- Tippie Students for Service – organization to helps address social issues in the community

=== Professional organizations ===
- Advocates for Cross-Cultural Experiences – organization that serves as a space for constructive conversations and understanding of cultural competence
- Alpha Kappa Psi – coed fraternity open to all business majors and minors who have at least three semesters remaining at Tippie
- Delta Sigma Pi – social fraternity
- Greater China Business Association – organization that educates students on American-Chinese relations, Chinese culture and business etiquette, and emerging trends
- Multicultural Business Students Association – organization that emphasizes business world diversity
- Phi Gamma Nu – national co-ed fraternity of the University of Iowa which teaches professionalism
- Reaching OUT in Business – organization for LGBTQ and allied students
- Women in Business – organization for women in business

== Rankings ==
Business school rankings

U.S. MBA Rankings
- Bloomberg (2025): NR
- U.S. News & World Report (2026): 36 Part-time MBA (2020)

For 2016, Financial Times ranked Tippie College of Business as #1 in the world for Finance, #2 in the world for percent employed at 3 months, and #2 for value for the money in the U.S. In 2017, the program as a whole was ranked #3 best in the U.S. and #23 in the world for "Value for the Money," #4 in the world for "Best in Finance," #1 in the U.S. and #9 in the world for "Percent Salary Increase," and #29 in the U.S. and #33 in the world for "Career Services" by the Financial Times.

=== MBA ===
The Tippie Master of Business Administration (MBA) program consistently ranks near the top of the Forbes Magazine listing of fastest payback on an MBA degree. In 2015, Tippie's Full-time MBA Program was ranked #6 for Fastest Payback and #26th overall in the U.S. by Forbes and was ranked #37 in the U.S. by Poets & Quants. In 2015, the professional MBA program was also ranked the #24 public program and the #52 program in the U.S. by Bloomberg Businessweek. For 2016, the full-time MBA program was ranked #35 in the U.S. and #2 for Job Placement by Bloomberg Businessweek. In 2018, the full-time MBA program was ranked #36 for public programs and #64 in the U.S. by U.S. News & World Report. In 2020, U.S. News & World Report ranked the Professional MBA program #22 in the U.S.

=== Undergraduate ===
The Tippie College undergraduate program was ranked in the Top 50 Public schools Bloomberg Businessweek in 2014. In 2014, the undergraduate program was also ranked the #49 undergraduate business program in Poets & Quants. In 2019, U.S. News & World Report ranked Tippie the #1 business school in Iowa and the #22 business school out of all public programs in the U.S. In 2021, Tippie's Business Analytics and Information Systems (BAIS) major was ranked 33 among undergraduate business analytics programs by U.S. News & World Report.

=== Miscellaneous ===
The Entrepreneurship Program was ranked #16 in the U.S. by The Princeton Review in 2019.

The college was ranked #4 Best Campus Environment in 2013 by Poets & Quants.

== See also ==
- List of United States business school rankings
- List of business schools in the United States
