= David Trulio =

American foundation executive and former government official

David V. Trulio
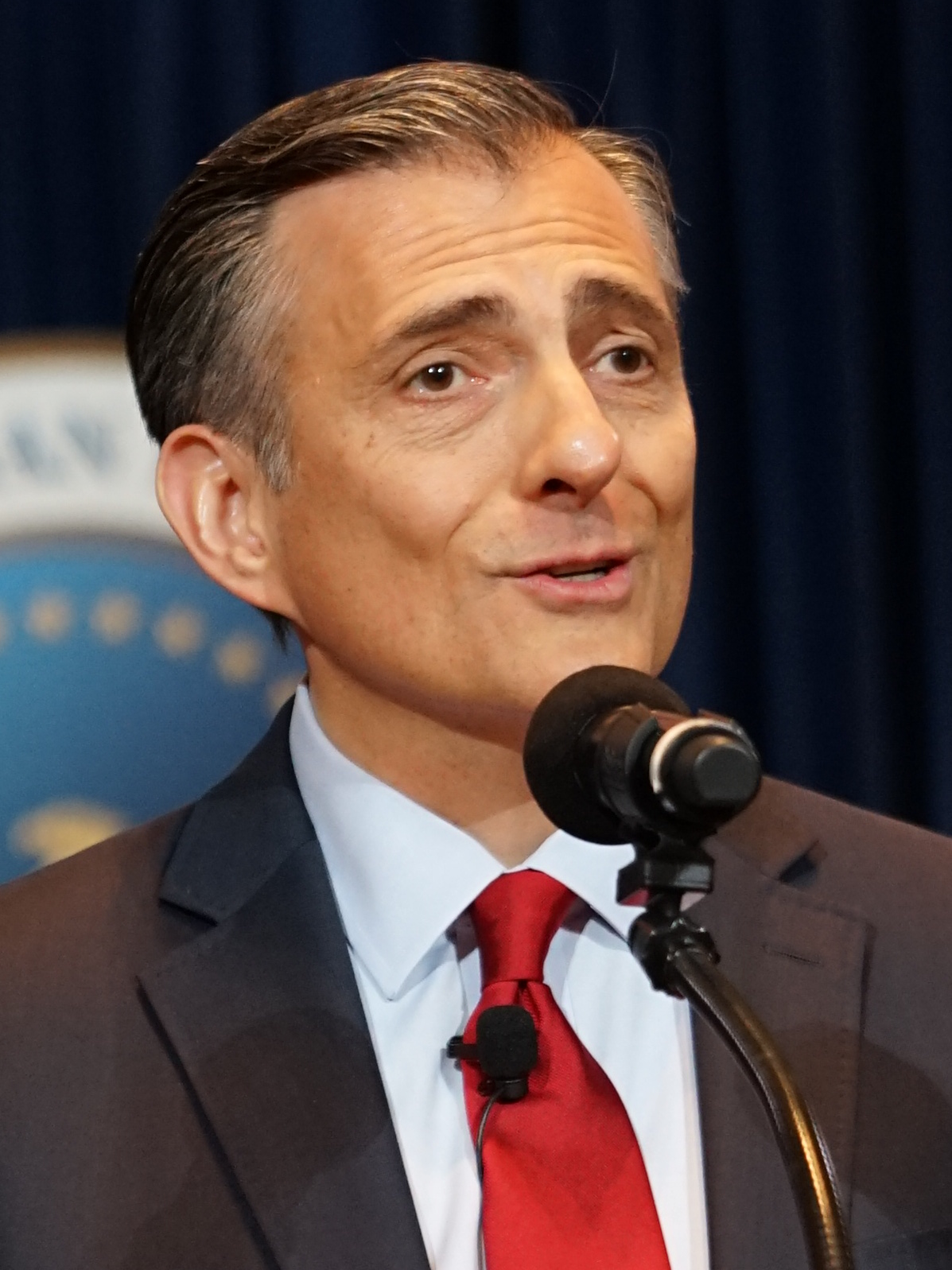
- Trulio in 2026
- Education: Princeton University (BA); Columbia Law School (JD); Harvard Business School (MBA)
- Occupations: President and CEO of the Ronald Reagan Presidential Foundation and Institute

David Trulio is an American business executive and former government official. He is the current President and Chief Executive Officer of the Ronald Reagan Presidential Foundation and Institute. He previously held leadership roles at Fox News Digital, the Export-Import Bank of the United States, and the United States Department of Defense.

== Education ==
Trulio earned a Bachelor of Arts in public and international affairs from Princeton University. He later earned a Juris Doctor from Columbia Law School, where he served on the Columbia Law Review, and a Master of Business Administration from Harvard Business School.

== Career ==
=== Early career and private sector ===
Trulio began his career as a corporate transactional lawyer at O'Melveny & Myers in Los Angeles. He later transitioned to the aerospace and defense industry, holding senior roles at Raytheon (including Director of Operations at Raytheon International) and Lockheed Martin, where he served as Vice President of International Government Affairs and Regional Executive for Latin America.

Prior to joining the Reagan Foundation, Trulio was the Managing Editor and Head of Strategy and Editorial Operations at Fox News Digital.

=== Government service ===
Trulio has served in multiple presidential administrations. During the George W. Bush administration, he was a Special Assistant to the President and Executive Secretary of the Homeland Security Council at the White House.

In the Department of Defense in the first Trump Administration, he served as Senior Advisor and Chief of Staff to the Under Secretary of Defense for Policy. He was later detailed to the Export-Import Bank of the United States (EXIM), where he served as Counselor to the Chairman and Senior Vice President for the Program on China and Transformational Exports.

=== Reagan Foundation ===
Trulio was appointed President and CEO of the Ronald Reagan Presidential Foundation and Institute in April 2023, succeeding John Heubusch. In this capacity, he oversees the Ronald Reagan Presidential Library in Simi Valley and the Reagan Institute in Washington, D.C.

== Recent news and appearances ==
In May 2024, Trulio testified before the House Select Committee on China regarding global development strategy. In 2025, he hosted the Reagan National Economic Forum, where he discussed the intersection of economic strength and national security.
