= Rachel Hirschfeld =

American lawyer

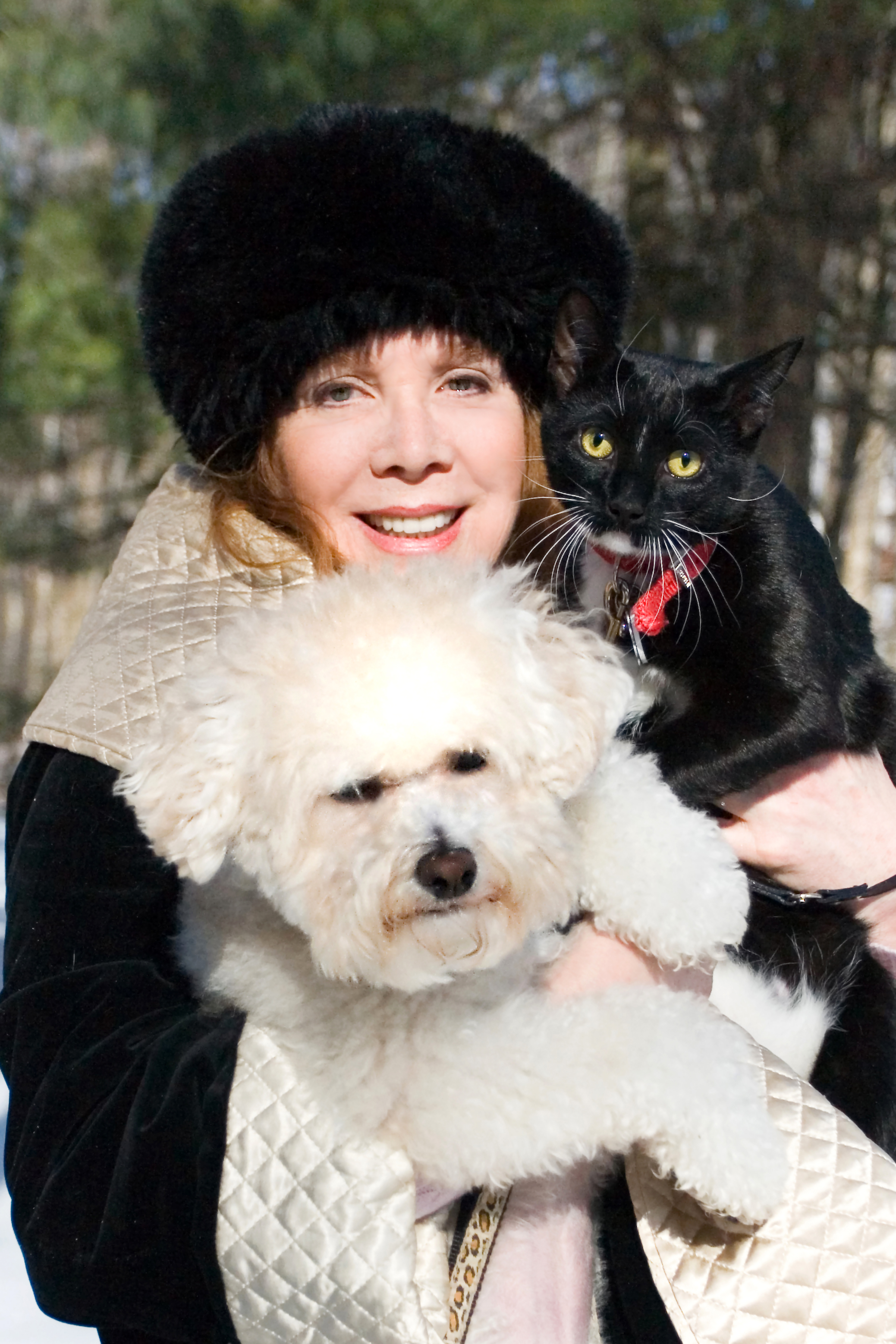
- Hirschfeld with her rescue animals Swizzle and Topper.
- Born: 1945/1946
- Died: September 28, 2018 (age 72); California, U.S.
- Education: Yeshiva University; Cardozo School of Law
- Occupations: Lawyer; Animal rights advocate Author
- Years active: 1999–2018
- Parent(s): Abraham Hirschfeld (deceased); Zipora Hirschfeld (deceased)

Rachel Hirschfeld (1945/1946 – September 28, 2018) was an animal welfare attorney specializing in the area of animal law, pet trusts, and pet protection agreements. She co-produced and was head producer of productions of many plays on and off-Broadway such as Oleanna and Blithe Spirit.

== Legal career ==
Hirschfeld was an advocate in the area of pet trusts. When a New York court awarded $2 million to Leona Helmsley's dog, Hirschfeld was quoted in The New Yorker calling it "one of the greatest moments for animals ongoing care". She noted that "It's a landmark case, for a judge to be able to say that we have a case for that amount of money."

Hirschfeld has been either quoted or profiled by news and media outlets in stories about pet trusts and pet rights including ABC's Nightline, The New Yorker, The New York Sun, Newsday, The Today Show, CNN, the CBS Early Show, and The Wall Street Journal.

Hirschfeld died on September 28, 2018, at age 72.

== Bibliography ==
- Petriarch: The Complete Guide To Financial and Legal Planning for a Pet's Continued Care (2010) ISBN 0-87051-870-4
