= Iowa Workforce Development =

American government agency

Iowa Workforce Development is a government agency in the American state of Iowa, responsible for overseeing workplace safety, workers' compensation, unemployment insurance and job training services. It was formed in May 1996.

== Divisions ==
The agency consists of six divisions.

=== Labor Services Division ===
- Enforces safety in the workplace
- Provides consultation to employers on occupational safety health compliance
- Conducts amusement ride, elevator and boiler inspections
- Maintains statistical information of workers' illness and injuries
- Enforces wage, labor and child laws

The Division of Labor Services is responsible for the enforcement of programs designed to protect the safety, health and economic security of all Iowans.

=== Workers' Compensation ===
- Oversee medical and wage replacement benefits to workers for injuries on the job, occupational diseases or hearing loss
- Conducts workers' compensation mediations and hearings

The Workers’ Compensation Act is a part of the Iowa Code designed to provide certain benefits to employees who receive injury (85), occupational disease (85A) or occupational hearing loss (85B) arising out of and during the course of their employment. Benefits are payable regardless of fault and are the exclusive remedy of the employee against the employer.

=== Unemployment Insurance ===
- Collects unemployment insurance taxes
- Maintains Iowa Unemployment Trust Fund
- Makes payments to eligible jobless workers

=== Division of Administrative Services ===
The Division of Administrative Services provides administrative support functions for the department, including employee services, building/premises management, office services, financial reporting and accounting.

=== Workforce Services ===
The Division of Workforce Services is responsible for the delivery of various state and federally funded employment and training services. Services are delivered through 15 regional one-stop centers and satellite offices.

The regional one-stop centers and offices provide a variety of services to meet the workforce and workplace needs of job seekers, dislocated workers, unemployed persons and Iowa businesses through partnerships of state and local service providers. They provide job counseling, job training, job placement and assistance to special needs populations.

=== Labor Market and Workforce ===
The Labor Market and Workforce Information Division collects, analyzes and prepares a wide array of economic statistics and information that describes labor areas in terms of their economic trends, industries, occupations, wages and workers.

The Division also works in cooperation with the United States Department of Labor’s Bureau of Labor Statistics and the Employment and Training Administration; the United States Census Bureau, other researchers and community development experts to produce information that is comparable in methodology and products for the nation, state and sub state areas. These products serve economic developers, employers, government, legislators, grant writers, Iowa Workforce Development staff and partners, job seekers, labor organizations, consultants, and academic institutions.
