= Learning Tree International =

Learning Tree International, Inc.
- Type: Public
- Traded as: Expert Market: LTRE
- Industry: Corporate Training
- Founded: 1974; 52 years ago
- Headquarters: Herndon, Virginia, U.S.
- Services: IT & Business Skills Training Courses

Learning Tree International, Inc., founded in 1974, is an IT training company based in Herndon, Virginia, United States. They offer training for business and technology skills. In 2010, the company had a revenue of $127.47 million.

== Overview ==
Founded in 1974, Learning Tree International provides IT and management training. Learning Tree delivers its courses in 4 ways: in-class at one of their global education centers, online from home or work, a blended approach of self-paced with in-person instruction or, at the user's location with on-site team training.

== History ==
Learning Tree International was founded in 1974 by two engineers, David C. Collins, Ph.D. and Eric R. Garen, under the name of Integrated Computer Systems. The first course offering was Microprocessors and Microcomputers.

During the 2000s, the company focused on the changing learning requirements of information technology professionals. The AnyWare platform was developed to allow students anywhere in the world to attend live, instructor-led classes virtually from their home or office.

== Awards and recognition ==
- 2017 ISACA #1 Accredited Training Provider in North America
