= Colloton =

Colloton is a surname. Notable people with the surname include:

- Ann Colloton, American swimmer
- John W. Colloton (born 1931), American hospital executive
- Pat Colloton (born 1944), American politician
- Steven Colloton (born 1963), American judge, son of John
