= 1922 Iowa Senate election =

- November 7, 1922

21 out of 50 seats in the Iowa State Senate 26 seats needed for a majority
	Majority party	Minority party
Party	Republican	Democratic
Last election	48	2
Seats after	47	3
Seat change	▼1	▲1
- Results; Democratic gain Democratic hold Republican hold

The 1922 Iowa State Senate elections took place as part of the biennial 1922 United States elections. Iowa voters elected state senators in 21 of the state senate's 50 districts. State senators serve four-year terms in the Iowa State Senate.

A statewide map of the 50 state Senate districts in the 1922 elections is provided by the Iowa General Assembly here.

The primary election on June 5, 1922, determined which candidates appeared on the November 7, 1922 general election ballot.

Following the previous election, Republicans had control of the Iowa Senate with 48 seats to Democrats' 2 seats.

Republicans maintained control of the Iowa State Senate following the 1922 general election with the balance of power shifting to Republicans holding 47 seats and Democrats having 3 seats (a net gain of 1 seat for Democrats). The death of Republican Senator D. C. Chase of district 37 necessitated a special election on March 31, 1923. Democrat William Schmedika went on to win that special election, flipping the seat to Democrats and increasing Democrats' seats to 4 in 1923.

== Summary of Results ==
- Note: The 29 holdover Senators not up for re-election are not listed on this table.

State Senate District	Incumbent	Party	Elected Senator	Party
1st	Joseph R. Frailey	Rep	Isaac N. Snook	Dem
7th	Herbert Inghram Foskett	Rep	Sylvester Calvin Rees	Rep
9th	Frank E. Thompson	Rep	Edward William Romkey	Rep
10th	James L. Brookhart	Rep	James L. Brookhart	Rep
12th	Theodore Charles Cessna	Rep	Theodore Charles Cessna	Rep
13th	Chester W. Whitmore	Rep	Frank B. Shane	Rep
18th	Julius A. Nelson	Rep	Julius A. Nelson	Rep
20th	Jonas DeMoss Buser	Rep	Jonas DeMoss Buser	Rep
21st	David W. Kimberly	Rep	David W. Kimberly	Rep
22nd	William Joseph Greenell	Rep	John O. Shaff	Rep
29th	David Meredith	Rep	A. H. Bergman	Rep
30th	Addison Melvin Parker	Rep	William J. Goodwin	Rep
34th	Milton Bird Pitt	Rep	Andrew Jackson Shinn	Rep
35th	Bernard J. Horchem	Dem	Bernard J. Horchem	Dem
37th	Eugene Schaffter	Rep	Daniel Cady Chase (Note: Republican Senator D. C. Chase died in office. His death necessitated a special election held on March 31, 1923. That special election was won by Democrat William Schmedika, flipping the district to Democrats.)	Rep
38th	James J. Rainbow	Rep	Melville L. Bowman	Rep
42nd	Carl Webster Reed	Rep	Carl Webster Reed	Rep
44th	William Hugh Scott	Rep	Ansel Taylor Brookins	Rep
45th	Harry Cook White	Dem	Harry Cook White	Dem
48th	Walter Witt Anderson	Rep	George B. Perkins	Rep
50th	Howard Spicer Van Alstine	Rep	Fred Cramer Gilchrist	Rep

== Detailed Results ==
- NOTE: The 29 districts that did not hold elections in 1922 are not listed here.
- Note: If a district does not list a primary, then that district did not have a competitive primary (i.e., there may have only been one candidate file for that district).

=== District 1 ===
Iowa Senate, District 1 General Election, 1922
Party	Candidate	Votes	%
Democratic	I. N. Snook	5,584	51.58%
Republican	J. P. Kennedy	5,241	48.42%
Total votes		10,825	100.00%
Democratic gain from Republican			

=== District 7 ===
Iowa Senate, District 7 Republican Primary Election, 1922
Party	Candidate	Votes	%
Republican	S. C. Rees	1,605	34.72%
Republican	J. R. Thompson	1,568	33.92%
Republican	F. O. Rutledge	1,450	31.36%
Total votes		4,623	100.00%

Iowa Senate, District 7 General Election, 1922
Party	Candidate	Votes	%
Republican	S. C. Rees	5,838	54.39%
Democratic	E. D. Winter	4,895	45.61%
Total votes		10,733	100.00%
Republican hold			

=== District 9 ===
Iowa Senate, District 9 Republican Primary Election, 1922
Party	Candidate	Votes	%
Republican	E. W. Romkey	1,686	57.48%
Republican	Frank E. Thompson (incumbent)	1,247	42.52%
Total votes		2,933	100.00%

Iowa Senate, District 9 General Election, 1922
Party	Candidate	Votes	%
Republican	E. W. Romkey	4,411	57.46%
Democratic	Samuel H. Sater	3,075	40.05%
Independent	E. P. Hagerty	191	2.49%
Total votes		7,677	100.00%
Republican hold			

=== District 10 ===
Iowa Senate, District 10 General Election, 1922
Party	Candidate	Votes	%
Republican	J. L. Brookhart (incumbent)	7,550	100.00%
Total votes		7,550	100.00%
Republican hold			

=== District 12 ===
Iowa Senate, District 12 Republican Primary Election, 1922
Party	Candidate	Votes	%
Republican	T. C. Cessna (incumbent)	2,942	53.69%
Republican	W. A. Harper	2,538	46.31%
Total votes		5,480	100.00%

Iowa Senate, District 12 General Election, 1922
Party	Candidate	Votes	%
Republican	T. C. Cessna (incumbent)	7,315	61.92%
Democratic	Grandville McCay	4,498	38.08%
Total votes		11,813	100.00%
Republican hold			

=== District 13 ===
Iowa Senate, District 13 Republican Primary Election, 1922
Party	Candidate	Votes	%
Republican	Frank Shane	2,096	48.12%
Republican	D. A. Emery	1,618	37.14%
Republican	A. W. Slaught	642	14.74%
Total votes		4,356	100.00%

Iowa Senate, District 13 General Election, 1922
Party	Candidate	Votes	%
Republican	Frank Shane	6,010	60.25%
Democratic	A. Areingdale	3,965	39.75%
Total votes		9,975	100.00%
Republican hold			

=== District 18 ===
Iowa Senate, District 18 Republican Primary Election, 1922
Party	Candidate	Votes	%
Republican	Julius A. Nelson (incumbent)	2,438	52.28%
Republican	Charles D. Booth	2,225	47.72%
Total votes		4,663	100.00%

Iowa Senate, District 18 General Election, 1922
Party	Candidate	Votes	%
Republican	Julius A. Nelson (incumbent)	6,472	57.68%
Democratic	Nilson G. Kraschel	4,749	42.32%
Total votes		11,221	100.00%
Republican hold			

=== District 20 ===
Iowa Senate, District 20 Republican Primary Election, 1922
Party	Candidate	Votes	%
Republican	Jonas D. Buser (incumbent)	2,904	50.27%
Republican	John J. Jenkins	2,313	40.04%
Republican	Bessie Farnsworth	560	9.69%
Total votes		5,777	100.00%

Iowa Senate, District 20 General Election, 1922
Party	Candidate	Votes	%
Republican	Jonas D. Buser (incumbent)	7,554	100.00%
Total votes		7,554	100.00%
Republican hold			

=== District 21 ===
Iowa Senate, District 21 General Election, 1922
Party	Candidate	Votes	%
Republican	D. W. Kimberly (incumbent)	9,973	100.00%
Total votes		9,973	100.00%
Republican hold			

=== District 22 ===
Iowa Senate, District 22 General Election, 1922
Party	Candidate	Votes	%
Republican	J. O. Shaff	6,218	51.58%
Democratic	Kurt Zaenicke	5,836	48.42%
Total votes		12,054	100.00%
Republican hold			

=== District 29 ===
Iowa Senate, District 29 Republican Primary Election, 1922
Party	Candidate	Votes	%
Republican	A. H. Bergman	1,859	53.76%
Republican	David Meredith (incumbent)	1,599	46.24%
Total votes		3,458	100.00%

Iowa Senate, District 29 General Election, 1922
Party	Candidate	Votes	%
Republican	A. H. Bergman	4,433	60.41%
Democratic	Frank Kimberly	2,905	39.59%
Total votes		7,338	100.00%
Republican hold			

=== District 30 ===
Iowa Senate, District 30 General Election, 1922
Party	Candidate	Votes	%
Republican	William J. Goodwin	15,982	77.22%
Democratic	John T. Chantry	4,355	21.04%
Independent	C. F. Schueltz	360	1.74%
Total votes		20,697	100.00%
Republican hold			

=== District 34 ===
Iowa Senate, District 34 Democratic Primary Election, 1922
Party	Candidate	Votes	%
Democratic	W. H. Wood (Note: Name is listed as "W. H. Wood" in Primary and "U. H. Wood" in General.)	1,029	40.64%
Democratic	George L. Harrison	969	38.27%
Democratic	L. B. Romans	534	21.09%
Total votes		2,532	100.00%

Iowa Senate, District 34 General Election, 1922
Party	Candidate	Votes	%
Republican	A. J. Shinn	8,979	52.74%
Democratic	U. H. Wood	8,047	47.26%
Total votes		17,026	100.00%
Republican hold			

=== District 35 ===
Iowa Senate, District 12 General Election, 1922
Party	Candidate	Votes	%
Democratic	B. J. Horchem (incumbent)	9,070	59.15%
Republican	C. W. Walton	6,263	40.85%
Total votes		15,333	100.00%
Democratic hold			

=== District 37 ===
Iowa Senate, District 37 Republican Primary Election, 1922
Party	Candidate	Votes	%
Republican	D. C. Chase	7,092	62.41%
Republican	W. T. S. Rath	4,271	37.59%
Total votes		11,363	100.00%

Iowa Senate, District 37 General Election, 1922
Party	Candidate	Votes	%
Republican	D. C. Chase	9,981	100.00%
Total votes		9,981	100.00%
Republican hold			

- Senator Chase died in office, which necessitated a special election to fill the 37th district seat.

Iowa Senate, District 37 Special Election, March 31, 1923
Party	Candidate	Votes	%
Democratic	William Schmedika	2,006	54.88%
Republican	Rube McFeren	1,649	45.12%
Total votes		3,655	100.0
Democratic gain from Republican			

=== District 38 ===
Iowa Senate, District 38 Republican Primary Election, 1922
Party	Candidate	Votes	%
Republican	M. L. Bowman	3,812	36.46%
Republican	C. B. Santee	3,510	33.57%
Republican	J. J. Rainbow (incumbent)	3,133	29.97%
Total votes		10,455	100.00%

Iowa Senate, District 38 General Election, 1922
Party	Candidate	Votes	%
Republican	M. L. Bowman	10,672	64.11%
Democratic	W. D. Strayer	5,974	35.89%
Total votes		16,646	100.00%
Republican hold			

=== District 42 ===
Iowa Senate, District 42 Republican Primary Election, 1922
Party	Candidate	Votes	%
Republican	Carl W. Reed (incumbent)	1,941	37.93%
Republican	Henry O. Ruen	1,844	36.04%
Republican	H. C. Gross	1,332	26.03%
Total votes		5,117	100.00%

Iowa Senate, District 42 General Election, 1922
Party	Candidate	Votes	%
Republican	Carl W. Reed (incumbent)	5,377	44.62%
Democratic	J. P. Kuhn	4,178	34.67%
Republican	Henry Ruen	1,974	16.38%
Republican	H. C. Gross	522	4.33%
Total votes		12,051	100.00%
Republican hold			

=== District 44 ===
Iowa Senate, District 44 Republican Primary Election, 1922
Party	Candidate	Votes	%
Republican	A. T. Brookins	2,297	37.96%
Republican	Lafe Hill	2,045	33.80%
Republican	James A. Cutler	1,709	28.24%
Total votes		6,051	100.00%

Iowa Senate, District 44 General Election, 1922
Party	Candidate	Votes	%
Republican	A. T. Brookins	6,800	67.17%
Democratic	Mamie S. Tieney	3,323	32.83%
Total votes		10,123	100.00%
Republican hold			

=== District 45 ===
Iowa Senate, District 45 General Election, 1922
Party	Candidate	Votes	%
Democratic	Harry C. White (incumbent)	6,254	51.44%
Republican	C. C. Borrows	5,905	48.56%
Total votes		12,159	100.00%
Democratic hold			

=== District 48 ===
Iowa Senate, District 48 Democratic Primary Election, 1922
Party	Candidate	Votes	%
Democratic	J. J. Carey	1,496	63.02%
Democratic	Charles O. Harker	878	36.98%
Total votes		2,374	100.00%

Iowa Senate, District 48 General Election, 1922
Party	Candidate	Votes	%
Republican	George B. Perkins	7,836	59.33%
Democratic	J. J. Carey	5,371	40.67%
Total votes		13,207	100.00%
Republican hold			

=== District 50 ===
Iowa Senate, District 50 General Election, 1922
Party	Candidate	Votes	%
Republican	F. C. Gilchrist	7,168	100.00%
Total votes		7,168	100.00%
Republican hold			

== See also ==
- United States elections, 1922
- United States House of Representatives elections in Iowa, 1922
- Elections in Iowa
