= 1918 Iowa Senate election =

- November 5, 1918

23 out of 50 seats in the Iowa State Senate 26 seats needed for a majority
	Majority party	Minority party
Party	Republican	Democratic
Last election	40	10
Seats after	45	5
Seat change	▲5	▼5
- Results; Republican gain Democratic hold Republican hold

The 1918 Iowa State Senate elections took place as part of the biennial 1918 United States elections. Iowa voters elected state senators in 23 of the state senate's 50 districts. State senators serve four-year terms in the Iowa State Senate.

A statewide map of the 50 state Senate districts in the 1918 elections is provided by the Iowa General Assembly here.

The primary election on June 3, 1918, determined which candidates appeared on the November 5, 1918 general election ballot.

Following the previous election, Republicans had control of the Iowa Senate with 40 seats to Democrats' 10 seats.

To claim control of the chamber from Republicans, the Democrats needed to net 16 Senate seats.

Republicans maintained control of the Iowa State Senate following the 1918 general election with the balance of power shifting to Republicans holding 45 seats and Democrats having 5 seats (a net gain of 5 seats for Republicans).

== Summary of Results ==
- Note: The 27 holdover Senators not up for re-election are not listed on this table.

State Senate District	Incumbent	Party	Elected Senator	Party
1st	Joseph R. Frailey	Rep	Joseph R. Frailey	Rep
6th	Benjamin J. Gibson	Rep	Francis Elmer Shane	Rep
7th	Herbert Inghram Foskett	Rep	Herbert Inghram Foskett	Rep
9th	Frank E. Thompson	Rep	Frank E. Thompson	Rep
10th	John Milton Lindl(e)y (Note: The Senator's name is listed as both "Lindly" and "Lindley" on the Iowa Senate website.)	Dem	James L. Brookhart	Rep
12th	Charles C. Laffer	Rep	Theodore Charles Cessna	Rep
13th	Chester W. Whitmore	Rep	Chester W. Whitmore	Rep
18th	John Cramer Voorhees	Dem	Julius A. Nelson	Rep
20th	Frederick William Eversmeyer	Rep	Jonas DeMoss Buser	Rep
21st	Fred G. Henigbaum	Rep	David W. Kimberly	Rep
22nd	William J. Greene	Dem	William Joseph Greenell	Rep
29th	David S. Fleck	Dem	David Meredith	Rep
30th	Addison Melvin Parker	Rep	Addison Melvin Parker	Rep
32nd (Note: The 32nd district held a special election to fill a vacancy.)	Charles Franklin Lytle	Rep	Bertel M. Stoddard	Rep
34th	Grant L. Caswell	Dem	Milton Bird Pitt	Rep
35th	Nicholas John Schrup	Dem	Bernard J. Horchem	Dem
37th	Daniel Cady Chase	Rep	Eugene Schaffter	Rep
38th	Henry W. Grout	Rep	James J. Rainbow	Rep
42nd	Lauritz M. Enger	Rep	Carl Webster Reed	Rep
44th	George Harold Jackson	Rep	William Hugh Scott	Rep
45th	Harry Cook White	Dem	Harry Cook White	Dem
48th	Charles C. Helmer	Rep	Walter Witt Anderson	Rep
50th	Howard Spicer Van Alstine	Rep	Howard Spicer Van Alstine	Rep

== Detailed Results ==
- NOTE: The 27 districts that did not hold elections in 1918 are not listed here.
- Note: If a district does not list a primary, then that district did not have a competitive primary (i.e., there may have only been one candidate file for that district).

=== District 1 ===
Iowa Senate, District 1 Republican Primary Election, 1918
Party	Candidate	Votes	%
Republican	Joseph R. Frailey (incumbent)	853	100.00%
Total votes		853	100.00%

Iowa Senate, District 1 General Election, 1918
Party	Candidate	Votes	%
Republican	Joseph R. Frailey (incumbent)	4,159	100.00%
Total votes		4,159	100.00%
Republican hold			

=== District 6 ===
Iowa Senate, District 6 General Election, 1918
Party	Candidate	Votes	%
Republican	F. E. Shane	2,906	63.20%
Unknown (Note: The Iowa General Assembly did not list political party affiliation for all candidates.)	C. F. Sheperd	1,692	36.80%
Total votes		4,598	100.00%
Republican hold			

=== District 7 ===
Iowa Senate, District 7 Republican Primary Election, 1918
Party	Candidate	Votes	%
Republican	H. I. Foskett (incumbent)	2,001	100.00%
Total votes		2,001	100.00%

Iowa Senate, District 7 Democratic Primary Election, 1918
Party	Candidate	Votes	%
Democratic	R. F. Hickman	9	100.00%
Total votes		9	100.00%

Iowa Senate, District 7 General Election, 1918
Party	Candidate	Votes	%
Republican	H. I. Foskett (incumbent)	3,849	63.20%
Democratic	R. F. Hickman	2,241	36.80%
Total votes		6,090	100.00%
Republican hold			

=== District 9 ===
Iowa Senate, District 9 Republican Primary Election, 1918
Party	Candidate	Votes	%
Republican	Frank E. Thompson (incumbent)	887	100.00%
Total votes		887	100.00%

Iowa Senate, District 9 Democratic Primary Election, 1918
Party	Candidate	Votes	%
Democratic	William C. Cross	966	100.00%
Total votes		966	100.00%

Iowa Senate, District 9 General Election, 1918
Party	Candidate	Votes	%
Republican	Frank E. Thompson (incumbent)	2,790	51.06%
Democratic	William C. Cross	2,674	48.94%
Total votes		5,464	100.00%
Republican hold			

=== District 10 ===
Iowa Senate, District 10 Republican Primary Election, 1918
Party	Candidate	Votes	%
Republican	J. L. Brookhart	1,564	59.63%
Republican	O. H. Dunlap	1,059	40.37%
Total votes		2,623	100.00%

Iowa Senate, District 10 Democratic Primary Election, 1918
Party	Candidate	Votes	%
Democratic	John M. Lindl(e)y (incumbent)	569	100.00%
Total votes		569	100.00%

Iowa Senate, District 10 General Election, 1918
Party	Candidate	Votes	%
Republican	J. L. Brookhart	3,798	54.94%
Democratic	John M. Lindl(e)y (incumbent)	3,115	45.06%
Total votes		6,913	100.00%
Republican gain from Democratic			

=== District 12 ===
Iowa Senate, District 12 Republican Primary Election, 1918
Party	Candidate	Votes	%
Republican	T. C. Cessna	1,293	51.19%
Republican	E. B. Williams	1,233	48.81%
Total votes		2,526	100.00%

Iowa Senate, District 12 Democratic Primary Election, 1918
Party	Candidate	Votes	%
Democratic	E. H. Mason	689	99.14%
Democratic	Buell McCash	6	0.86%
Total votes		695	100.00%

Iowa Senate, District 12 General Election, 1918
Party	Candidate	Votes	%
Republican	T. C. Cessna	4,659	60.29%
Democratic	E. H. Mason	3,069	39.71%
Total votes		7,728	100.00%
Republican hold			

=== District 2 ===
Iowa Senate, District 2 Republican Primary Election, 1918
Party	Candidate	Votes	%
Republican	(incumbent)		35.93%
Republican			53.91%
Republican			53.91%
Total votes		6,301	100.00%

Iowa Senate, District 12 Democratic Primary Election, 1918
Party	Candidate	Votes	%
Democratic	(incumbent)		53.91%
Democratic			53.91%
Democratic			53.91%
Total votes		6,301	100.00%

Iowa Senate, District 12 General Election, 1918
Party	Candidate	Votes	%
Republican	(incumbent)		53.91%
Democratic			53.91%
Unknown			53.91%
Independent			53.91%
Total votes		6,301	100.00%
Republican hold			

=== District 13 ===
Iowa Senate, District 13 Republican Primary Election, 1918
Party	Candidate	Votes	%
Republican	C. W. Whitmore (incumbent)	2,032	100.00%
Total votes		2,032	100.00%

Iowa Senate, District 13 Democratic Primary Election, 1918
Party	Candidate	Votes	%
Democratic	J. A. Lowenberg	1,272	100.00%
Total votes		1,272	100.00%

Iowa Senate, District 13 Socialist Primary Election, 1918
Party	Candidate	Votes	%
Socialist	F. M. Boch (Note: Name is listed as both "Boch" and "Bock" on the Iowa Official Register.)	31	100.00%
Total votes		31	100.00%

Iowa Senate, District 13 General Election, 1918
Party	Candidate	Votes	%
Republican	C. W. Whitmore (incumbent)	3,850	60.54%
Democratic	J. A. Lowenberg	2,387	37.54%
Socialist	Frank Bock	122	1.92%
Total votes		6,359	100.00%
Republican hold			

=== District 18 ===
Iowa Senate, District 18 Republican Primary Election, 1918
Party	Candidate	Votes	%
Republican	Julius A. Nelson	1,097	63.30%
Republican	Albert Johnson	636	36.70%
Total votes		1,733	100.00%

Iowa Senate, District 18 Democratic Primary Election, 1918
Party	Candidate	Votes	%
Democratic	John C. Voorhees (incumbent)	496	100.00%
Total votes		496	100.00%

Iowa Senate, District 18 General Election, 1918
Party	Candidate	Votes	%
Republican	Julius A. Nelson	4,079	62.13%
Democratic	John C. Voorhees (incumbent)	2,486	37.87%
Total votes		6,565	100.00%
Republican gain from Democratic			

=== District 20 ===
Iowa Senate, District 20 Republican Primary Election, 1918
Party	Candidate	Votes	%
Republican	J. D. Buser	2,306	99.91%
Republican	D. D. Webster	2	0.09%
Total votes		2,308	100.00%

Iowa Senate, District 20 General Election, 1918
Party	Candidate	Votes	%
Republican	J. D. Buser	5,040	100.00%
Total votes		5,040	100.00%
Republican hold			

=== District 21 ===
Iowa Senate, District 21 Republican Primary Election, 1918
Party	Candidate	Votes	%
Republican	D. W. Kimberly	1,144	100.00%
Total votes		1,144	100.00%

Iowa Senate, District 21 Socialist Primary Election, 1918
Party	Candidate	Votes	%
Socialist	Charles S. Elwood	64	100.00%
Total votes		64	100.00%

Iowa Senate, District 21 General Election, 1918
Party	Candidate	Votes	%
Republican	D. W. Kimberly	6,898	58.41%
Unknown	Andrew L. Shezem	2,775	23.50%
Unknown	Joseph Lindsey	2,136	18.09%
Total votes		11,809	100.00%
Republican hold			

=== District 22 ===
Iowa Senate, District 22 Republican Primary Election, 1918
Party	Candidate	Votes	%
Republican	W. J. Greenell	1,093	38.53%
Republican	J. O. Shaff	962	33.91%
Republican	George F. Tucker	782	27.56%
Total votes		2,837	100.00%

Iowa Senate, District 22 General Election, 1918
Party	Candidate	Votes	%
Republican	W. J. Greenell	4,263	59.28%
Unknown	John L. Wilson	2,928	40.72%
Total votes		7,191	100.00%
Republican gain from Democratic			

=== District 29 ===
Iowa Senate, District 29 Republican Primary Election, 1918
Party	Candidate	Votes	%
Republican	David Meredith	1,168	100.00%
Total votes		1,168	100.00%

Iowa Senate, District 29 Democratic Primary Election, 1918
Party	Candidate	Votes	%
Democratic	D. S. Fleck (incumbent)	535	100.00%
Total votes		535	100.00%

Iowa Senate, District 29 General Election, 1918
Party	Candidate	Votes	%
Republican	David Meredith	2,588	53.19%
Democratic	D. S. Fleck (incumbent)	2,121	43.59%
Unknown	Perry Engle	157	3.23%
Total votes		4,866	100.00%
Republican gain from Democratic			

=== District 30 ===
Iowa Senate, District 30 General Election, 1918
Party	Candidate	Votes	%
Republican	Addison M. Parker (incumbent)	7,717	100.00%
Total votes		7,717	100.00%
Republican hold			

=== District 32 ===
Iowa Senate, District 32 Republican Primary Election, 1918
Party	Candidate	Votes	%
Republican	B. M. Stoddard	3,471	100.00%
Total votes		3,471	100.00%

Iowa Senate, District 32 Democratic Primary Election, 1918
Party	Candidate	Votes	%
Democratic	J. F. Brooks	44	100.00%
Total votes		44	100.00%

Iowa Senate, District 32 General Election, 1918
Party	Candidate	Votes	%
Republican	B. M. Stoddard	5,261	61.55%
Democratic	J. F. Brooks	3,287	38.45%
Total votes		8,548	100.00%
Republican hold			

=== District 34 ===
Iowa Senate, District 34 Republican Primary Election, 1918
Party	Candidate	Votes	%
Republican	Milton B. Pitt	1,659	100.00%
Total votes		1,659	100.00%

Iowa Senate, District 34 Democratic Primary Election, 1918
Party	Candidate	Votes	%
Democratic	Ed. M. Whiting	1,493	100.00%
Total votes		1,493	100.00%

Iowa Senate, District 34 General Election, 1918
Party	Candidate	Votes	%
Republican	Milton B. Pitt	5,854	53.23%
Democratic	Ed. M. Whiting	5,143	46.77%
Total votes		10,997	100.00%
Republican gain from Democratic			

=== District 35 ===
Iowa Senate, District 35 Democratic Primary Election, 1918
Party	Candidate	Votes	%
Democratic	B. J. Horchem	2,527	100.00%
Total votes		2,527	100.00%

Iowa Senate, District 35 General Election, 1918
Party	Candidate	Votes	%
Democratic	B. J. Horchem	4,773	71.23%
Unknown	R. E. Knapp	1,928	28.77%
Total votes		6,701	100.00%
Democratic hold			

=== District 37 ===
Iowa Senate, District 37 Republican Primary Election, 1918
Party	Candidate	Votes	%
Republican	H. M. Sparboe	1,869	30.07%
Republican	Eugene Schaffter (Note: Despite placing in second, Schaffter would go on to the general election.)	1,862	29.96%
Republican	Rube McFerren	1,565	25.18%
Republican	H. W. Emeny	919	14.79%
Total votes		6,215	100.00%

Iowa Senate, District 37 Democratic Primary Election, 1918
Party	Candidate	Votes	%
Democratic	J. S. Fort	22	100.00%
Total votes		22	100.00%

Iowa Senate, District 37 General Election, 1918
Party	Candidate	Votes	%
Republican	Eugene Schaffter	6,151	80.46%
Democratic	J. S. Fort	1,494	19.54%
Total votes		7,645	100.00%
Republican hold			

=== District 38 ===
Iowa Senate, District 38 Republican Primary Election, 1918
Party	Candidate	Votes	%
Republican	J. J. Rainbow	1,170	30.81%
Republican	M. L. Bowman	1,039	27.36%
Republican	Edmond K. Greene	961	25.31%
Republican	H. W. Grout (incumbent)	627	16.51%
Total votes		3,797	100.00%

Iowa Senate, District 38 Democratic Primary Election, 1918
Party	Candidate	Votes	%
Democratic	John F. Simpson	443	100.00%
Total votes		443	100.00%

Iowa Senate, District 38 General Election, 1918
Party	Candidate	Votes	%
Republican	J. J. Rainbow	6,344	64.78%
Democratic	John F. Simpson	3,449	35.22%
Total votes		9,793	100.00%
Republican hold			

=== District 42 ===
Iowa Senate, District 42 Republican Primary Election, 1918
Party	Candidate	Votes	%
Republican	Carl W. Reed	937	40.30%
Republican	H. L. Spaulding	904	38.88%
Republican	John F. Murtha	484	20.82%
Total votes		2,325	100.00%

Iowa Senate, District 42 Democratic Primary Election, 1918
Party	Candidate	Votes	%
Democratic	G. A. Meyer	786	100.00%
Total votes		786	100.00%

Iowa Senate, District 42 General Election, 1918
Party	Candidate	Votes	%
Republican	Carl W. Reed	3,445	55.04%
Democratic	G. A. Meyer	2,814	44.96%
Total votes		6,259	100.00%
Republican hold			

=== District 44 ===
Iowa Senate, District 44 Republican Primary Election, 1918
Party	Candidate	Votes	%
Republican	W. H. Scott	1,514	56.79%
Republican	W. G. Henke	1,152	43.21%
Total votes		2,666	100.00%

Iowa Senate, District 44 Democratic Primary Election, 1918
Party	Candidate	Votes	%
Democratic	S. B. Bellamy	613	100.00%
Total votes		613	100.00%

Iowa Senate, District 44 General Election, 1918
Party	Candidate	Votes	%
Republican	W. H. Scott	3,676	62.12%
Democratic	S. B. Bellamy	2,242	37.88%
Total votes		5,918	100.00%
Republican hold			

=== District 45 ===
Iowa Senate, District 45 Republican Primary Election, 1918
Party	Candidate	Votes	%
Republican	F. E. Shortess	1,169	60.23%
Republican	David E. Mackie	772	39.77%
Total votes		1,941	100.00%

Iowa Senate, District 45 Democratic Primary Election, 1918
Party	Candidate	Votes	%
Democratic	Harry C. White (incumbent)	798	100.00%
Total votes		798	100.00%

Iowa Senate, District 45 General Election, 1918
Party	Candidate	Votes	%
Democratic	Harry C. White (incumbent)	4,185	51.19%
Republican	Fremont E. Shortess	3,991	48.81%
Total votes		8,176	100.00%
Democratic hold			

=== District 48 ===
Iowa Senate, District 48 Republican Primary Election, 1918
Party	Candidate	Votes	%
Republican	W. W. Anderson	3,828	100.00%
Total votes		3,828	100.00%

Iowa Senate, District 48 Democratic Primary Election, 1918
Party	Candidate	Votes	%
Democratic	Charles E. Goodenow	14	100.00%
Total votes		14	100.00%

Iowa Senate, District 48 General Election, 1918
Party	Candidate	Votes	%
Republican	W. W. Anderson	4,595	58.15%
Democratic	Charles E. Goodenow	3,307	41.85%
Total votes		7,902	100.00%
Republican hold			

=== District 50 ===
Iowa Senate, District 50 Republican Primary Election, 1918
Party	Candidate	Votes	%
Republican	H. S. Van Alstine (incumbent)	2,593	56.20%
Republican	Roy W. Murray	2,021	43.80%
Total votes		4,614	100.00%

Iowa Senate, District 50 Democratic Primary Election, 1918
Party	Candidate	Votes	%
Democratic	C. E. Cameron	99	100.00%
Total votes		99	100.00%

Iowa Senate, District 50 General Election, 1918
Party	Candidate	Votes	%
Republican	H. S. Van Alstine (incumbent)	3,689	53.05%
Democratic	C. E. Cameron	3,265	46.95%
Total votes		6,954	100.00%
Republican hold			

== See also ==
- United States elections, 1918
- United States House of Representatives elections in Iowa, 1918
- Elections in Iowa
