= Jane L. Kelly =

American judge (born 1964)

Jane Kelly
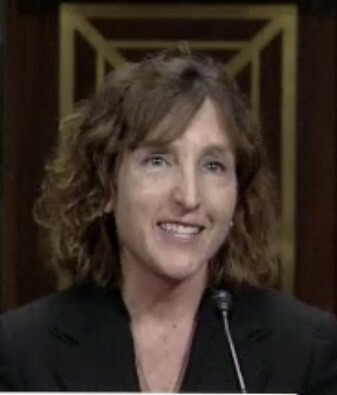
- Kelly in 2013

Judge of the United States Court of Appeals for the Eighth Circuit
- Incumbent
- Assumed office April 25, 2013
- Appointed by: Barack Obama
- Preceded by: Michael Joseph Melloy

Personal details
- Born: Jane Louise Kelly; October 28, 1964 (age 61) Greencastle, Indiana, U.S.
- Education: Duke University (BA); Harvard University (JD)

Jane Louise Kelly (born October 28, 1964) is an American lawyer and jurist serving as a United States circuit judge of the United States Court of Appeals for the Eighth Circuit.

== Early life and education ==
Kelly was born in 1964 in Greencastle, Indiana, to Richard and Judith C. Kelly. She graduated from Greencastle High School in 1983 as co-valedictorian. She received a Bachelor of Arts degree, summa cum laude, in 1987, from Duke University, and a Juris Doctor, cum laude, from Harvard Law School, in 1991. She studied pediatrics for one year in New Zealand under a Fulbright Scholarship in between Duke and Harvard. Her graduating class included Barack Obama.

== Career ==
After graduation, Kelly was a law clerk for Donald J. Porter, chief judge of the United States District Court for the District of South Dakota in Sioux Falls, South Dakota. She then clerked for David R. Hansen, a judge of the United States Court of Appeals for the Eighth Circuit. During the 1993–94 academic year, Kelly taught as a visiting instructor at the University of Illinois College of Law.

In 1994, Kelly became an assistant federal public defender in the Northern District of Iowa. From 1999 to 2013, she served as the supervising attorney in the Cedar Rapids, Iowa office.

=== Federal judicial service ===
On January 31, 2013, President Barack Obama nominated Kelly to serve as a United States Circuit Judge of the United States Court of Appeals for the Eighth Circuit, to the seat vacated by Judge Michael Joseph Melloy, who assumed senior status on February 1, 2013. Her nomination was reported on a voice vote of the Senate Judiciary Committee on March 22. The Senate confirmed Kelly by a 96–0 vote on April 24. She received her commission on April 25.

In March 2016, Kelly was reported to be a potential nominee for the Supreme Court to replace the vacancy caused by the death of Justice Antonin Scalia. The conservative Judicial Crisis Network ran ads against her to forestall the nomination.

== Notable cases ==
- In July 2017, Kelly dissented when the en banc Eighth Circuit found, by a vote of 7–2, that the National Labor Relations Act did not protect Jimmy John's employees from being fired for putting up Industrial Workers of the World posters seeking sick leave.
- On August 23, 2019, Kelly dissented when the Eighth Circuit ruled in favor of a religious exemption from a state's anti-discrimination law.
- Five days before Election Day 2020, the 8th circuit ruled that all Minnesota ballots received after Election Day should be set aside, leaving it to the district court whether those ballots should be thrown out. Kelly strongly dissented, noting that Minnesota voters had already been informed that ballots received by Election Day could be counted as long as they were postmarked by Election Day. As state officials urged voters to turn in ballots sooner rather than later as a result of this ruling, only 2,447 ballots arrived after Election Day, causing the plaintiffs to drop their case.
- Kelly authored a June 9, 2021, order that blocked part of a Missouri abortion law that would ban abortion after 8 weeks.

== Personal life ==
In 2004, Kelly was attacked while jogging in a park in Cedar Rapids, brutally beaten and left barely conscious; her assailant was never identified.

== See also ==
- Barack Obama Supreme Court candidates

Legal offices
Preceded by Michael Joseph Melloy	Judge of the United States Court of Appeals for the Eighth Circuit; 2013–present	Incumbent
