= C. J. Williams (judge) =

American judge (born 1963)

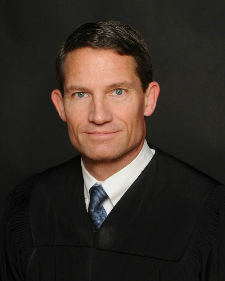

Chief Judge of the United States District Court for the Northern District of Iowa
- Incumbent
- Assumed office February 12, 2024
- Preceded by: Leonard T. Strand

Judge of the United States District Court for the Northern District of Iowa
- Incumbent
- Assumed office September 10, 2018
- Appointed by: Donald Trump
- Preceded by: Linda R. Reade

Personal details
- Born: Charles Joseph Williams; 1963 (age 62–63) Cedar Rapids, Iowa, U.S.
- Education: University of Iowa (BA, JD); University of Missouri, Kansas City (LLM)

Charles Joseph Williams (born 1963) is the chief United States district judge of the United States District Court for the Northern District of Iowa. He was formerly a United States magistrate judge of the same court.

== Biography ==
Williams received a Bachelor of Arts from the Tippie College of Business at the University of Iowa with high distinction in 1985. He then received a Juris Doctor, with high distinction, from the University of Iowa College of Law in 1988. During law school, Williams worked at Seyfarth Shaw in Chicago and served as an associate editor of the Iowa Law Review.

== Career ==
Following law school, Williams served as a law clerk to Judge Donald E. O'Brien of the United States District Courts for the Northern and Southern Districts of Iowa.

He then worked from 1990 to 1992 as a trial attorney in the United States Department of Justice Criminal Division and was detailed as a Special Assistant United States Attorney for the Eastern District of Virginia.

From 1992 to 1997, Williams was a trial attorney specializing in complex civil litigation and criminal defense at Lathrop & Gage in Kansas City. During that period, from 1995 to 1997, Willams studied at the University of Missouri–Kansas City School of Law and received a Master of Laws with a specialization in criminal law.

From 1997 to 2016, Williams rejoined the Department of Justice and served as an Assistant United States Attorney for the Northern District of Iowa. In 2008, he was promoted to Senior Litigation Counsel and became a specialist in white-collar crime.

=== Federal judicial service ===
Williams served as a United States magistrate judge of the United States District Court for the Northern District of Iowa from February 16, 2016 to September 10, 2018, preceded by Leonard T. Strand and succeeded by Mark Roberts. He was chief magistrate judge from January 1, 2017, to September 10, 2018, preceded by Jon Scoles and succeeded by Kelly Mahoney.

On February 12, 2018, President Donald Trump announced his intent to nominate Williams to an undetermined seat on the United States District Court for the Northern District of Iowa. His nomination was recommended by Chuck Grassley and Joni Ernst after screening by a judicial merit selection committee. On February 15, 2018, his nomination was sent to the Senate. President Trump nominated Williams to the seat vacated by Judge Linda R. Reade, who assumed senior status on October 1, 2017. On March 21, 2018, a hearing on his nomination was held before the Senate Judiciary Committee. On April 19, 2018, his nomination was reported out of committee by a 19–2 vote. On September 6, 2018, the United States Senate confirmed his nomination by a 79–12 vote. He received his judicial commission on September 10, 2018. He became chief judge on February 12, 2024.

== Academic writing ==
Williams has written two books with West and many law review articles on trial practice, evidence, and criminal law. He published Advanced Evidence: Applying the Federal Rules of Evidence in Pretrial and Litigation in 2018 and Federal Criminal Practice with Sean Barry in 2016. His law review articles have been published in the Iowa Law Review, the South Carolina Law Review, the Oklahoma Law Review, the Nebraska Law Review, the Connecticut Law Review, the UMKC Law Review, the Mississippi Law Journal, the Drake Law Review, the American Criminal Law Review, the American Journal of Trial Advocacy, The Federal Lawyer, and the Criminal Law Bulletin.

Williams has also taught at the University of Iowa College of Law, the University of South Dakota School of Law, the University of Missouri–Kansas City School of Law, and North Iowa Area Community College. He currently teaches Advanced Evidence and Federal Criminal Practice at Iowa Law.

Legal offices
Preceded by Linda R. Reade	Judge of the United States District Court for the Northern District of Iowa; 2018–present	Incumbent
Preceded by Leonard T. Strand	Chief Judge of the United States District Court for the Northern District of Iowa; 2024–present	Incumbent
