= Judge Strand =

Judge Strand may refer to:

- Leonard T. Strand (born 1965), judge of the United States District Court for the Northern District of Iowa
- Roger Gordon Strand (1934–2017), judge of the United States District Court for the District of Arizona
