= C. J. Williams =

C. J. Williams may refer to:

- C. J. Williams (basketball), an American professional basketball player who last played for the Start Lublin basketball club
- C. J. Williams (judge), the chief United States district judge of the United States District Court for the Northern District of Iowa
- CJ Williams (American football), a professional wide receiver for the Jacksonville Jaguars NFL team
