= Roy Laverne Stephenson =

American judge (1917–1982)

Senior Judge of the United States Court of Appeals for the Eighth Circuit
- In office April 1, 1982 – November 5, 1982

Judge of the United States Court of Appeals for the Eighth Circuit
- In office June 22, 1971 – April 1, 1982
- Appointed by: Richard Nixon
- Preceded by: Martin Donald Van Oosterhout
- Succeeded by: George Gardner Fagg

Chief Judge of the United States District Court for the Southern District of Iowa
- In office 1961–1971
- Preceded by: Office established
- Succeeded by: William Cook Hanson

Judge of the United States District Court for the Southern District of Iowa
- In office May 31, 1960 – July 6, 1971
- Appointed by: Dwight D. Eisenhower
- Preceded by: Edwin Richley Hicklin
- Succeeded by: William Corwin Stuart

Personal details
- Born: Roy Laverne Stephenson; March 14, 1917 Spirit Lake, Iowa, U.S.
- Died: November 5, 1982 (aged 65)
- Education: University of Iowa (BA); University of Iowa College of Law (JD)

Roy Laverne Stephenson (March 14, 1917 – November 5, 1982) was a United States circuit judge of the United States Court of Appeals for the Eighth Circuit and previously was a United States district judge of the United States District Court for the Southern District of Iowa.

== Education and career ==
Born in Spirit Lake, Iowa, Stephenson graduated from high school in nearby Spencer, Iowa. He received a Bachelor of Arts degree from the State University of Iowa (now University of Iowa) in 1938, followed by a Juris Doctor from the State University of Iowa College of Law in 1940. He was a second lieutenant in the United States Army Reserve from 1938 to 1941, while serving in private practice in Mapleton, Iowa from 1940 to 1941. After the United States entered World War II, he served in North Africa and Italy with the 34th Infantry Division of the United States Army from 1941 to 1946, rising to the rank of captain. He was in private practice in Des Moines, Iowa from 1946 to 1953 until President Dwight D. Eisenhower nominated him to serve as the United States Attorney for the Southern District of Iowa, a position he held from 1953 to 1960. Before his appointment, while serving as chairman of the Polk County Republican Central Committee, Stephenson had been an early and active supporter of Eisenhower's candidacy.

== Federal judicial service ==
Stephenson was nominated by President Dwight D. Eisenhower on May 16, 1960, to a seat on the United States District Court for the Southern District of Iowa vacated by Judge Edwin Richley Hicklin. He was confirmed by the United States Senate on May 26, 1960, and received his commission on May 31, 1960. He served as Chief Judge from 1961 to 1971. His service was terminated on July 6, 1971, due to his elevation to the Eighth Circuit.

Stephenson was nominated by President Richard Nixon on June 1, 1971, to a seat on the United States Court of Appeals for the Eighth Circuit vacated by Judge Martin Donald Van Oosterhout. He was confirmed by the Senate on June 18, 1971, and received his commission on June 22, 1971. He assumed senior status on April 1, 1982. His service was terminated on November 5, 1982, due to his death.

== Sources ==
Legal offices
Preceded by Edwin Richley Hicklin	Judge of the United States District Court for the Southern District of Iowa; 1960–1971	Succeeded by William Corwin Stuart
Preceded by Office established	Chief Judge of the United States District Court for the Southern District of Iowa; 1961–1971	Succeeded by William Cook Hanson
Preceded by Martin Donald Van Oosterhout	Judge of the United States Court of Appeals for the Eighth Circuit; 1971–1982	Succeeded by George Gardner Fagg
