= Linda R. Reade =

American judge (born 1948)

Linda Rae Reade
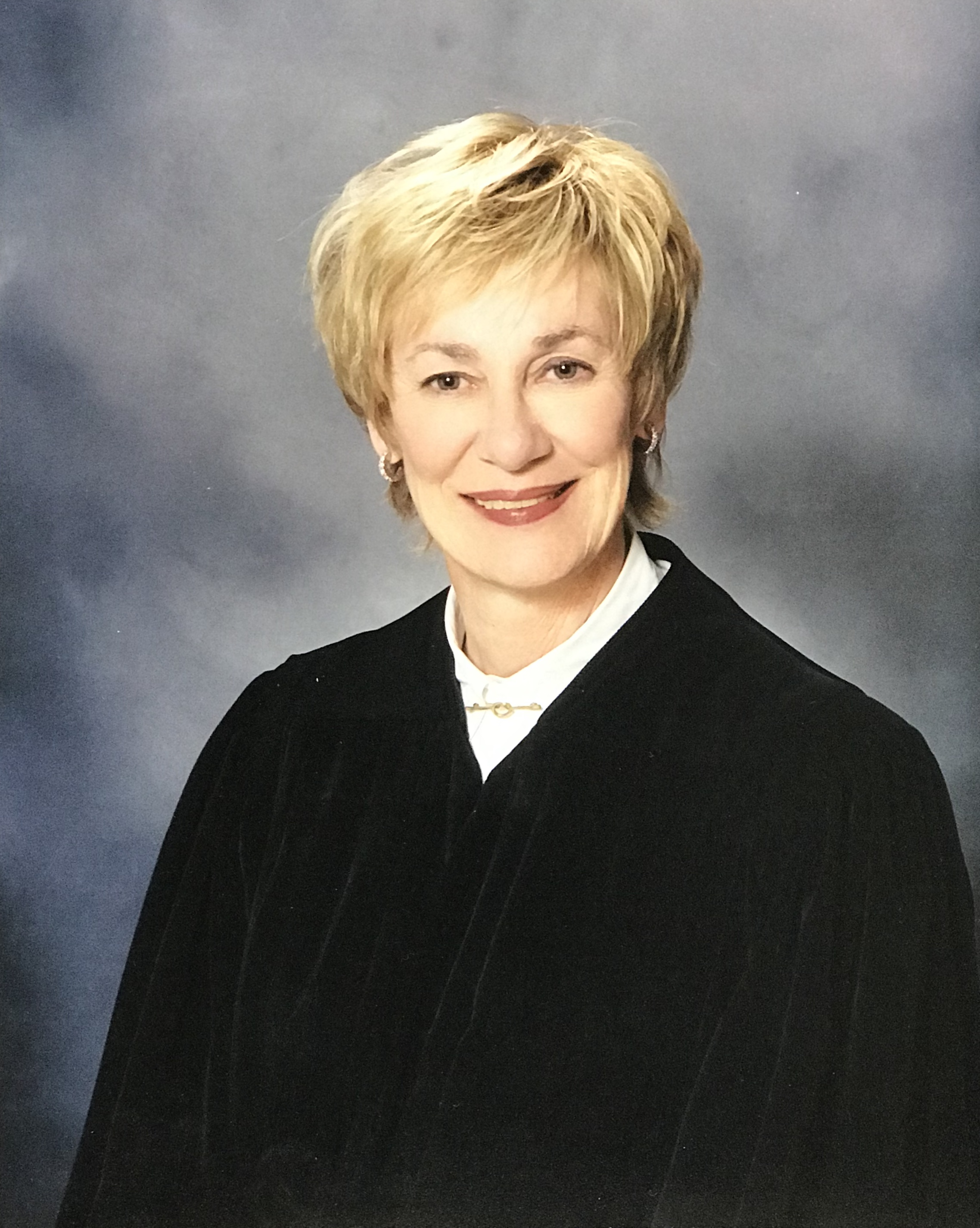

Senior Judge of the United States District Court for the Northern District of Iowa
- Incumbent
- Assumed office October 1, 2017

Chief Judge of the United States District Court for the Northern District of Iowa
- In office January 1, 2007 – February 11, 2017
- Preceded by: Mark W. Bennett
- Succeeded by: Leonard T. Strand

Judge of the United States District Court for the Northern District of Iowa
- In office November 26, 2002 – October 1, 2017
- Appointed by: George W. Bush
- Preceded by: Michael Joseph Melloy
- Succeeded by: C. J. Williams

Personal details
- Born: February 1, 1948 (age 78) Sioux Falls, South Dakota, U.S.
- Education: Drake University (BA, JD); Iowa State University (MS)

Linda Rae Reade (born February 1, 1948) is a senior United States district judge of the United States District Court for the Northern District of Iowa.

== Early life ==
Reade was born in Sioux Falls, South Dakota, on February 1, 1948. Reade graduated from Drake University with her Bachelor of Arts degree in 1970. She then attended the Iowa State University, graduating with a Master of Science degree in 1973. She graduated from Drake University Law School with a Juris Doctor with honors and Order of the Coif in 1980. During law school, Reade worked at two firms in Des Moines, Rosenberg & Marguiles and Brown, Winick, Graves, Donnelly, & Baskerville, and campaigned for Lawrence Pope. She also published a case note in the Drake Law Review.

== Career ==
After graduation, Reade was in private practice as an attorney in Des Moines, Iowa at Brown, Winick from 1980 to 1981, at Rosenberg & Marguiles from 1981 to 1984, and at Rosenberg, Rosenberg, & Reade from 1984 to 1986. She also served as president of the Des Moines League of Women Voters from 1985 to 1987.

Reade was an assistant United States attorney in the U.S. Attorney's Office for the Southern District of Iowa from 1986 to 1993, serving as chief of the General Criminal Prosecutions Division from 1990 to 1993.

Reade was appointed to serve on the Iowa District Court in Des Moines in 1993 and continued until her appointment to the federal bench in 2002. During that time, she served on many committees for the Iowa Supreme Court, the Iowa Judges' Association, and the Iowa State Bar Association. While she served on the District Court, 18 of her cases were reversed.

=== Federal judicial career ===
On Senator Chuck Grassley's recommendation, President George W. Bush nominated Reade to the United States District Court for the Northern District of Iowa on June 26, 2002, to a seat vacated by Michael Joseph Melloy. The Senate confirmed her on November 14, 2002, and she received her commission on November 26. She became Chief Judge on January 1, 2007. Her term as chief judge ended on February 11, 2017. She assumed senior status on October 1, 2017.

=== Notable cases ===
==== Rubashkin case ====
Reade presided over the trial and sentencing of kosher slaughterhouse operator Sholom Rubashkin. The case and Reade's 27-year sentence garnered the attention of many prominent politicians and received widespread media coverage. Rubashkin alleged on appeal that Reade improperly met with prosecutors before the Postville raid without disclosing her involvement, but the United States Court of Appeals for the Eighth Circuit unanimously affirmed. On December 20, 2017, after having served eight years of his 27-year sentence, President Donald Trump commuted Rubashkin's sentence to time served, and he was released from prison that day.

==== Aossey case ====
Reade presided over the case of William Aossey, the founder of Midamar Corporation and Islamic Services of America, who was convicted of fraud for falsifying labels on beef exported to Malaysia and Indonesia. Aossey was found guilty and Reade departed from federal guidelines, sentencing Aossey to two years.

==== Dierks case ====
On June 13, 2018, Reade sentenced Joseph Dierks to six years in prison for threatening to kill Senator Joni Ernst on Twitter. The sentence, which exceeded federal sentencing guidelines, was imposed on Dierks for disparaging comments he made regarding Reade, the prosecutor, the prosecutor's children, and black corrections officers.

== See also ==
- List of first women lawyers and judges in Iowa

Legal offices
| Preceded by Michael Joseph Melloy | Judge of the United States District Court for the Northern District of Iowa; 2002–2017 | Succeeded by C. J. Williams |
| Preceded by Mark W. Bennett | Chief Judge of the United States District Court for the Northern District of Iowa; 2007–2017 | Succeeded by Leonard T. Strand |
