= Michael Joseph Melloy =

American judge (1948–2026)

Michael Melloy
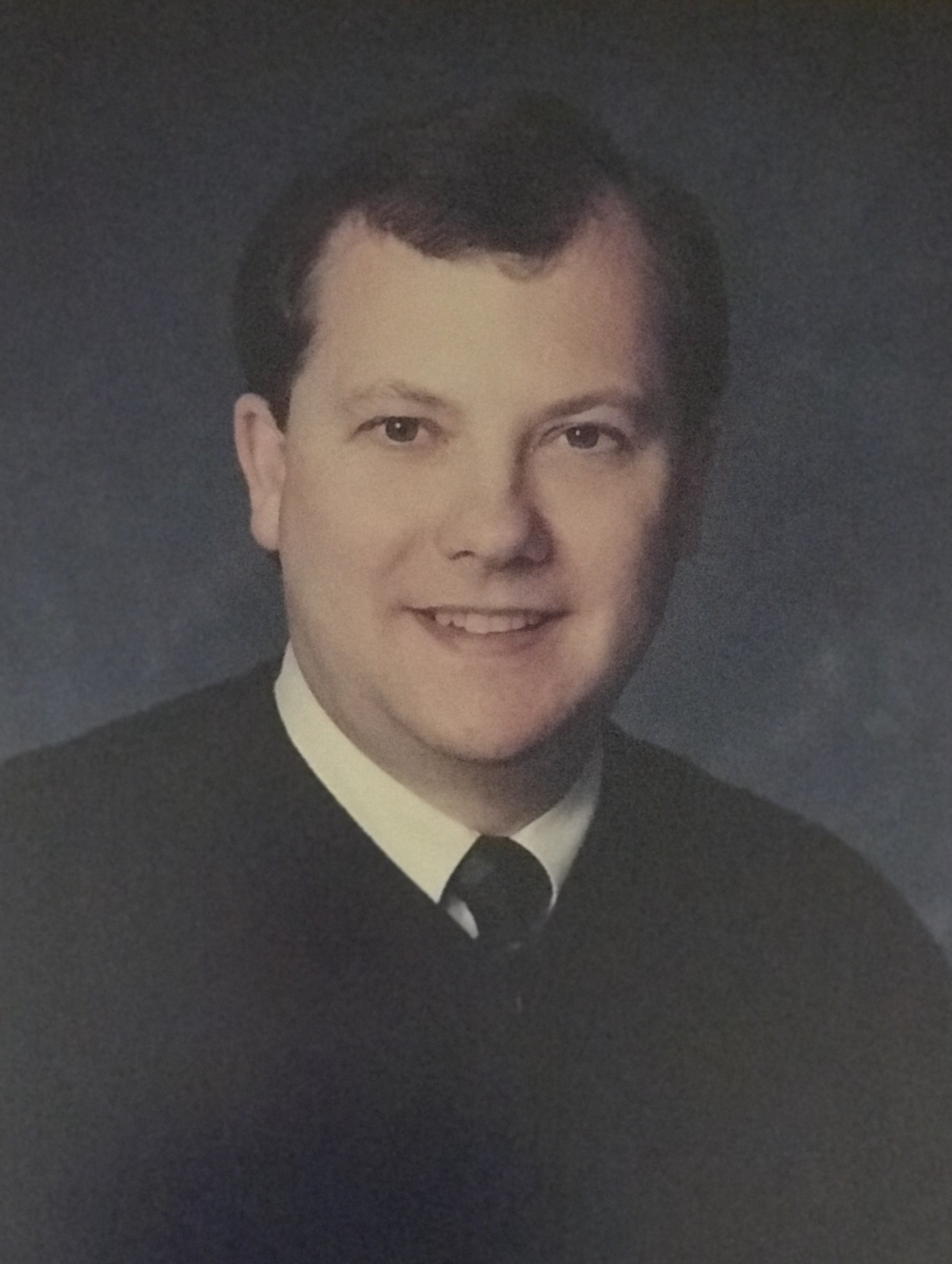
- Melloy's N.D. Iowa court portrait

Senior Judge of the United States Court of Appeals for the Eighth Circuit
- In office February 1, 2013 – October 20, 2026

Judge of the United States Court of Appeals for the Eighth Circuit
- In office February 14, 2002 – February 1, 2013
- Appointed by: George W. Bush
- Preceded by: George Gardner Fagg
- Succeeded by: Jane L. Kelly

Chief Judge of the United States District Court for the Northern District of Iowa
- In office 1992–1999
- Preceded by: Donald E. O'Brien
- Succeeded by: Mark W. Bennett

Judge of the United States District Court for the Northern District of Iowa
- In office August 17, 1992 – February 26, 2002
- Appointed by: George H. W. Bush
- Preceded by: David R. Hansen
- Succeeded by: Linda R. Reade

Personal details
- Born: Michael Joseph Melloy; January 15, 1948 Dubuque, Iowa, U.S.
- Died: October 20, 2026 (aged 78)
- Education: Loras College (BA); University of Iowa (JD)

Michael Joseph Melloy (January 15, 1948 – October 20, 2026) was a United States circuit judge of the United States Court of Appeals for the Eighth Circuit.

== Early life, education and military service ==
Melloy was born in Dubuque, Iowa, and graduated from Wahlert High School in 1966. He received a Bachelor of Arts degree in economics from Loras College in 1970, magna cum laude, and a Juris Doctor from University of Iowa College of Law in 1974, with high distinction. During law school, Melloy interned at the Jo Daviess County, Illinois attorney's office.

He served in the United States Army from 1970 to 1972, and in the United States Army Reserve from 1972 to 1976. He was initially stationed at Fort Leonard Wood.

== Career ==
Melloy practiced primarily civil litigation and also administrative law, real estate, bankruptcy, and tax as an associate and then as a partner at O’Connor & Thomas in Dubuque from 1974 until 1986. He also regularly co-chaired Tom Tauke's congressional campaigns and served in various capacities for Catholic organizations, including the Dubuque Catholic Metropolitan School Board, Clarke University, and the Knights of Columbus.

=== Federal judicial service ===
Melloy was a judge of the United States Bankruptcy Court for the Northern District of Iowa from 1986 to 1992.

On April 9, 1992, Melloy was nominated by President George H. W. Bush to a seat on the United States District Court for the Northern District of Iowa vacated by Judge David R. Hansen. Melloy was confirmed by the United States Senate on August 12, 1992, and received his commission on August 17, 1992. He served as chief judge from 1992 to 1999. He was also chair of the bankruptcy committee of the Judicial Conference of the United States.

On September 4, 2001, Melloy was nominated by President George W. Bush to a seat on the United States Court of Appeals for the Eighth Circuit vacated by Judge George Gardner Fagg. Melloy was confirmed by the United States Senate on February 11, 2002, by a 91–0 vote. He received his commission on February 14, 2002. Melloy took senior status on February 1, 2013 and fully retired in 2024.

On April 2, 2018, the Supreme Court of the United States appointed Melloy as Special Master in the case of Texas v. New Mexico and Colorado.

== Death ==
Melloy died from cancer on October 20, 2026, at the age of 78.

Legal offices
| Preceded by David R. Hansen | Judge of the United States District Court for the Northern District of Iowa; 1992–2002 | Succeeded by Linda R. Reade |
| Preceded by Donald E. O'Brien | Chief Judge of the United States District Court for the Northern District of Iowa; 1992–1999 | Succeeded by Mark W. Bennett |
| Preceded by George Gardner Fagg | Judge of the United States Court of Appeals for the Eighth Circuit; 2002–2013 | Succeeded by Jane L. Kelly |
