= Henry Thomas Reed =

American judge (1846–1924)

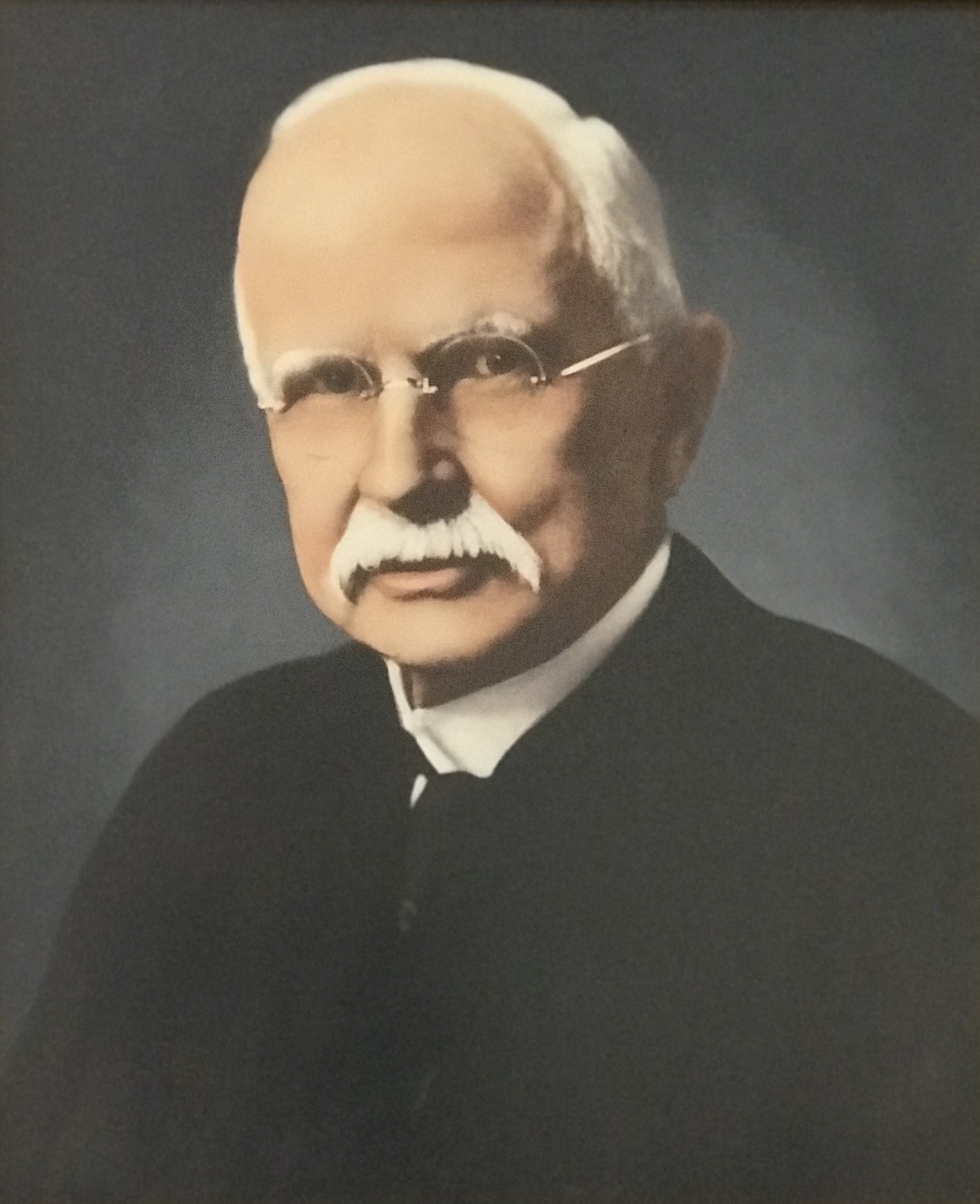
- Reed's court portrait

Senior Judge of the United States District Court for the Northern District of Iowa
- In office November 30, 1921 – February 22, 1924

Judge of the United States District Court for the Northern District of Iowa
- In office March 7, 1904 – November 30, 1921
- Appointed by: Theodore Roosevelt
- Preceded by: Oliver Perry Shiras
- Succeeded by: George Cromwell Scott

Personal details
- Born: October 1, 1846 Alburgh, Vermont
- Died: February 22, 1924 (aged 77) Cresco, Iowa
- Spouse: Laura Webster
- Children: Carl Webster Reed
- Education: Read law

Henry Thomas Reed (October 1, 1846 – February 22, 1924) was a United States district judge of the United States District Court for the Northern District of Iowa.

== Education and career ==
Born in Alburgh, Vermont, Reed read law in 1870. He was in private practice in Cresco, Iowa from 1870 to 1904. He was a member of the Iowa House of Representatives in 1876.

== Federal judicial service ==
Reed was nominated by President Theodore Roosevelt on March 5, 1904, to a seat on the United States District Court for the Northern District of Iowa vacated through the retirement of Judge Oliver Perry Shiras. He was confirmed by the United States Senate on March 7, 1904, and received his commission the same day. After over fifteen years of active service, he assumed senior status on November 30, 1921. Reed's service ended when he died at his home in Cresco on February 22, 1924.

== Sources ==
Legal offices
Preceded by Oliver Perry Shiras	Judge of the United States District Court for the Northern District of Iowa; 1904–1921	Succeeded by George Cromwell Scott
