= Kevin W. Techau =

American attorney

Kevin Techau
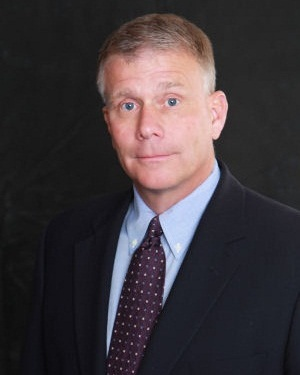

United States Attorney for the Northern District of Iowa
- In office February 21, 2014 – March 10, 2017
- President: Barack Obama; Donald Trump
- Preceded by: Sean Berry (acting)
- Succeeded by: Peter Deegan

Personal details
- Born: Kevin Wayne Techau; December 6, 1958 (age 67) Iowa City, Iowa, U.S.
- Party: Democratic
- Spouse: Stephanie Glenn (m. 1997)
- Children: 2
- Education: University of Iowa (BBA, JD)

Military service
- Branch/service: United States Air Force
- Years of service: 1985–1992 (active); 1993–2011 (guard)
- Rank: Colonel
- Unit: U.S. Air Force Judge Advocate General's Corps
- Commands: 185th Fighter Wing; 132nd Fighter Wing
- Awards: Legion of Merit

Kevin Wayne Techau (born December 6, 1958) is an American attorney and retired military officer who served as the United States Attorney for the Northern District of Iowa from 2014 to 2017. He previously held senior roles in Iowa state government and served as a colonel in the United States Air Force.

== Early life and education ==
Techau was born in Iowa City and raised in Marion. His family has lived for six generations in Iowa. He went to Marion High School and then earned a business degree and a Juris Doctor from the University of Iowa. During his studies, he worked on an assembly line making circuit breakers and as a track laborer on the Chicago North Western Railroad to help pay for his education.

== Military career ==
Following law school, Techau served in the United States Air Force for seven years including two deployments in Europe as a judge advocate. Upon leaving active duty, he joined the Iowa Air National Guard and served with the 185th Fighter Wing in Sioux City, 132nd Fighter Wing in Des Moines and the Iowa Air National Guard Joint Forces Headquarters at Camp Dodge. He retired as a colonel with 27 years of military service and he received the Legion of Merit.

== Legal career ==
Techu, after leaving active duty military service, worked in private practice at the Des Moines law firm Grefe & Sidney and then as an assistant federal public defender. He later served in the administration of Governor Tom Vilsack and Lieutenant Governor Sally Pederson, first as the director of the Iowa Department of Inspections and Appeals from 1999 to 2002, and then as commissioner of the Iowa Department of Public Safety from 2002 to 2007.

From 2007 until his appointment as U.S. Attorney, Techau worked as associate general counsel at American Equity Investment Life Insurance Company.

== U.S. Attorney for the Northern District of Iowa ==
In November 2013, President Barack Obama nominated Techau to be U.S. Attorney for the Northern District of Iowa, following a recommendation by Iowa Senator Tom Harkin. Republican Senator Chuck Grassley also spoke in favor of his nomination. He was unanimously confirmed by the Senate in February 2014. As U.S. Attorney, he led prosecutions in a 52-county region on matters including drug trafficking, firearm offenses, white-collar crime, and child exploitation, and represented the federal government in civil litigation. He served until March 2017, stepping down after the Trump administration requested the resignations of all Obama-era U.S. Attorneys.

== U.S. House of Representatives campaign ==
On April 17, 2025, Techau announced his candidacy for the United States House of Representatives for Iowa's 2nd congressional district as a Democrat. The district includes Cedar Rapids, Waterloo, Dubuque and Mason City. But then in late June, Techau suspended his campaign due to lack of funding.

== Personal life ==
Techau lives in Cedar Rapids with his wife, Stephanie Glenn, who is an attorney. They married in 1997 and have two children.

== See also ==
- 2017 dismissal of U.S. attorneys
