= George Gardner Fagg =

American judge (1934–2015)

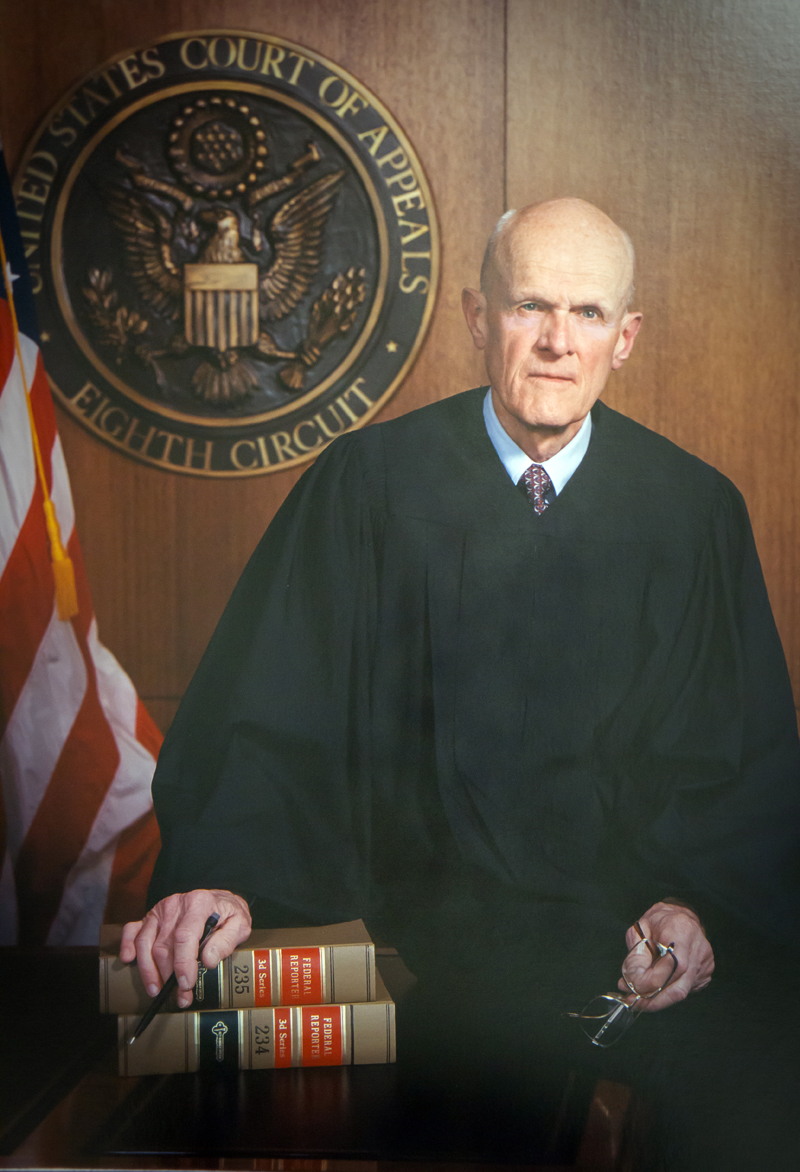

Senior Judge of the United States Court of Appeals for the Eighth Circuit
- In office May 1, 1999 – July 14, 2015

Judge of the United States Court of Appeals for the Eighth Circuit
- In office October 1, 1982 – May 1, 1999
- Appointed by: Ronald Reagan
- Preceded by: Roy Laverne Stephenson
- Succeeded by: Michael Joseph Melloy

Personal details
- Born: George Gardner Fagg; April 30, 1934 Eldora, Iowa, U.S.
- Died: July 14, 2015 (aged 81) Johnston, Iowa, U.S.
- Education: Drake University (BA, JD)

George Gardner Fagg (April 30, 1934 – July 14, 2015) was a United States circuit judge of the United States Court of Appeals for the Eighth Circuit.

== Education and career ==
Born in Eldora, Iowa, Fagg received a Bachelor of Arts degree from Drake University in 1956, and a Juris Doctor from Drake University Law School in 1958. After practicing law in Marshalltown, Iowa from 1958 to 1972, he was appointed to the Iowa state district court bench in the 2nd Judicial District, where he served from 1972 to 1982.

== Federal judicial service ==
Fagg was nominated by President Ronald Reagan on September 22, 1982, to a seat on the United States Court of Appeals for the Eighth Circuit that was vacated when Judge Roy Laverne Stephenson assumed senior status. He was confirmed by the United States Senate on October 1, 1982, and received his commission the same day. He assumed senior status on May 1, 1999. Fagg died on July 14, 2015, in Johnston, Iowa.

Legal offices
Preceded by Roy Laverne Stephenson	Judge of the United States Court of Appeals for the Eighth Circuit; 1982–1999	Succeeded by Michael Joseph Melloy
