= Steven Colloton =

American federal judge (born 1963)

Steve Colloton
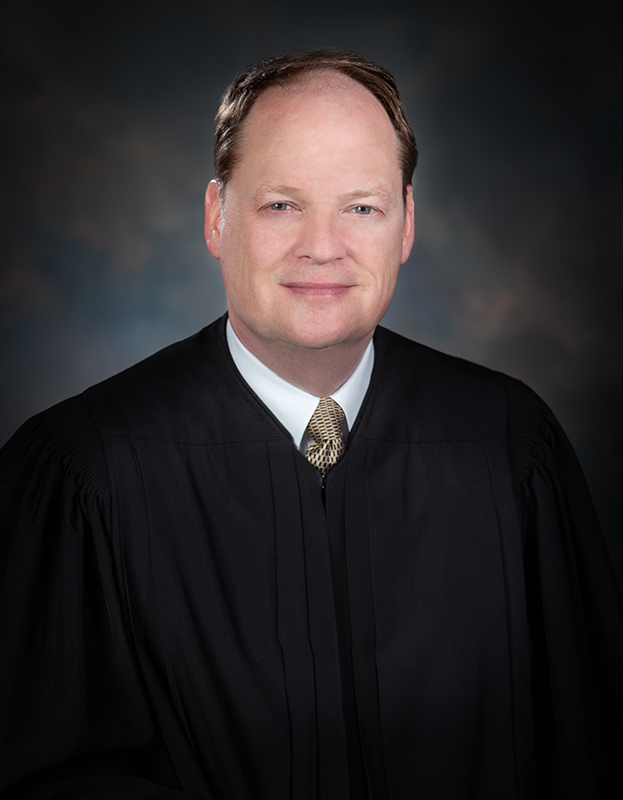

Chief Judge of the United States Court of Appeals for the Eighth Circuit
- Incumbent
- Assumed office March 11, 2024
- Preceded by: Lavenski Smith

Judge of the United States Court of Appeals for the Eighth Circuit
- Incumbent
- Assumed office September 10, 2003
- Appointed by: George W. Bush
- Preceded by: David R. Hansen

United States Attorney for the Southern District of Iowa
- In office October 2001 – September 2003
- President: George W. Bush
- Preceded by: Don Nickerson
- Succeeded by: Matthew Whitaker

Personal details
- Born: Steven Michael Colloton; January 9, 1963 (age 63) Iowa City, Iowa, U.S.
- Relations: John W. Colloton (father); Ann Colloton (sister)
- Education: Princeton University (BA); Yale University (JD)

Steven Michael Colloton (born January 9, 1963) is an American lawyer and jurist who serves as the chief judge of the United States Court of Appeals for the Eighth Circuit. He was appointed to the Eighth Circuit in 2003 by President George W. Bush and has been its chief judge since 2024. He previously served from 2000 to 2003 as the United States Attorney for the Southern District of Iowa.

== Early life and education ==
Colloton was born on January 9, 1963, in Iowa City, Iowa. He is the son of John W. Colloton, best known for his service as director and CEO for the University of Iowa Hospitals and Clinics from 1971 to 1993. Colloton is also the brother of Ann Colloton. Steven attended Iowa City West High School.

Colloton graduated from Princeton University in 1985 with a Bachelor of Arts degree, summa cum laude, and membership in Phi Beta Kappa. At Princeton, Colloton was a member of the Ivy Club, then an all-male eating club. He then attended Yale Law School, where he was an articles editor of the Yale Law Journal and a recipient of the Potter Stewart Prize in moot court. He also published a note in the Yale Law & Policy Review defending single-sex student organizations, and in particular Princeton eating clubs such as the Ivy Club. He graduated from Yale in 1988 with a Juris Doctor degree.

== Career ==
After law school, Colloton was a law clerk to Judge Laurence Silberman of the U.S. Court of Appeals for the District of Columbia Circuit from 1988 to 1989 and to Chief Justice William Rehnquist of the U.S. Supreme Court from 1989 to 1990.

Colloton served as a special assistant to the attorney general in the Office of Legal Counsel within the United States Justice Department from 1990 to 1991. He was an Assistant United States Attorney in the Northern District of Iowa in Cedar Rapids from 1991 to 1999. From 1995 to 1996 he was an associate independent counsel in the Office of Independent Counsel Kenneth Starr. He was a partner at Belin McCormick, a law firm in Des Moines, from 1999 to 2001 and served as an adjunct lecturer at the University of Iowa College of Law in 2000. In 2000, Colloton worked for George W. Bush's presidential campaign in Iowa. After Bush's election in 2000, Colloton was appointed U.S. Attorney for the Southern District of Iowa and served until 2003.

== Federal judicial service ==
Colloton was nominated to the United States Court of Appeals for the Eighth Circuit by President George W. Bush on February 12, 2003, to a seat vacated by David R. Hansen. His nomination was supported by both Chuck Grassley and Tom Harkin. He was confirmed nearly seven months later by the Senate on September 4, 2003, by a 94–1 vote, with only Senator Fritz Hollings voting against his confirmation. He received his commission on September 10, 2003. He became chief judge on March 11, 2024. He was on President Donald Trump's list of potential Supreme Court candidates.

=== Notable Rulings ===
In February 2017, Colloton vacated the enhanced sentences imposed upon members of the Native Mob, finding that Minnesota's definition of burglary was not a violent felony under the Armed Career Criminal Act.

== See also ==
- List of law clerks for the chief justice of the United States
- Donald Trump Supreme Court candidates

Legal offices
Preceded by Don Nickerson	United States Attorney for the Southern District of Iowa; 2001–2003	Succeeded by Matthew Whitaker
Preceded by David R. Hansen	Judge of the United States Court of Appeals for the Eighth Circuit; 2003–present	Incumbent
Preceded by Lavenski Smith	Chief Judge of the United States Court of Appeals for the Eighth Circuit; 2024–present	Incumbent
