= Oliver Perry Shiras =

American judge (1833–1916)

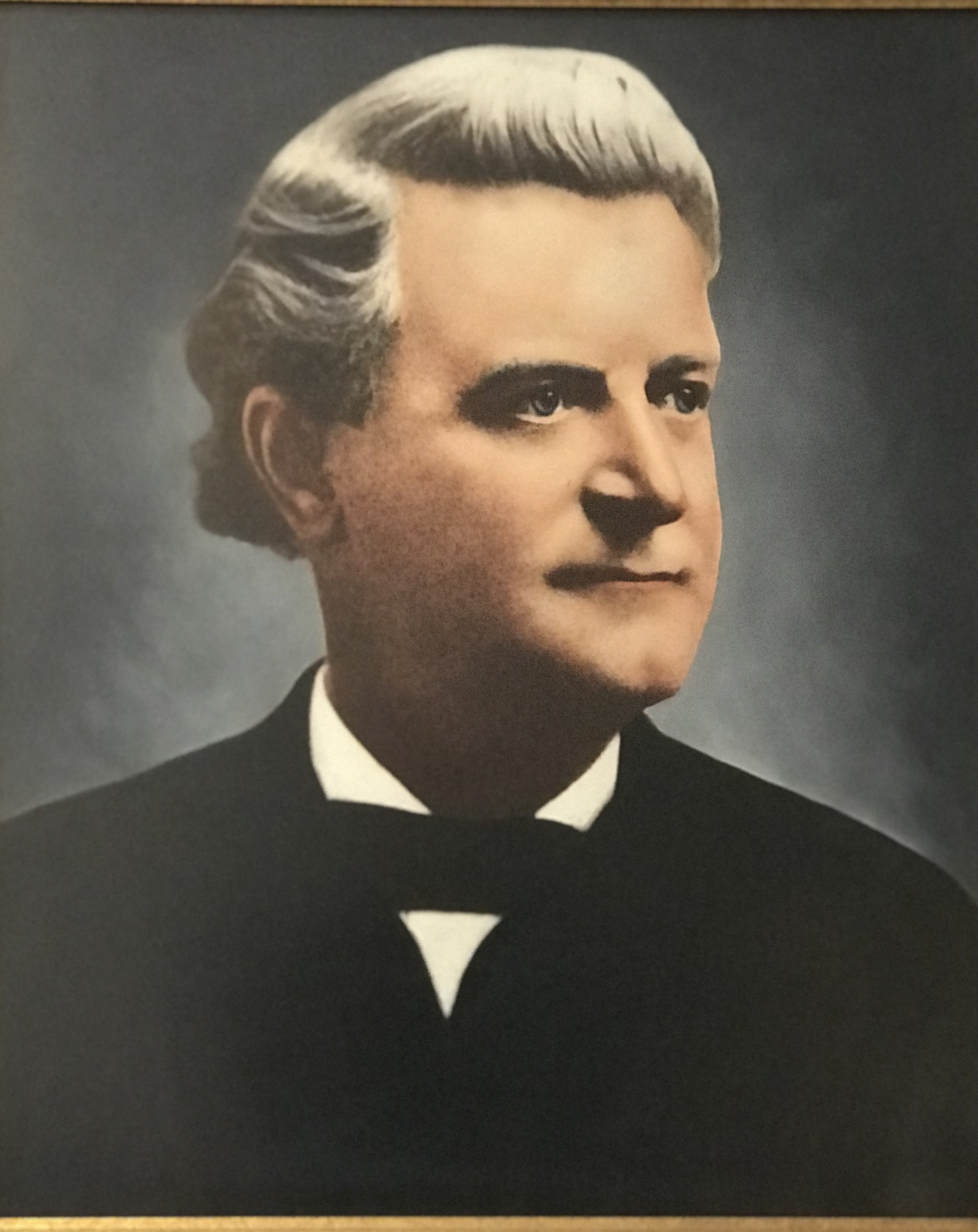
- Shiras's court portrait

Judge of the United States District Court for the Northern District of Iowa
- In office August 4, 1882 – November 1, 1903
- Appointed by: Chester A. Arthur
- Preceded by: Seat established by 22 Stat. 172
- Succeeded by: Henry Thomas Reed

Personal details
- Born: October 22, 1833 Pittsburgh, Pennsylvania
- Died: January 7, 1916 (aged 82) Seabreeze, Florida
- Education: Ohio University (A.B., A.M.); Yale Law School (LL.B.)
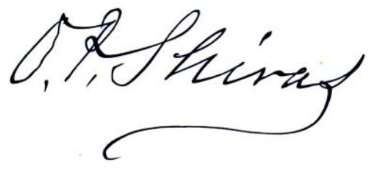
- Signature

Oliver Perry Shiras (October 22, 1833 – January 7, 1916) was the first United States district judge of the United States District Court for the Northern District of Iowa.

== Education and career ==
Born in Pittsburgh, Pennsylvania, Shiras received an Artium Baccalaureus degree in 1853, and an Artium Magister degree in 1856 from Ohio University, and a Bachelor of Laws from Yale Law School in 1856. Relocating to Iowa in 1856, he went into private practice in Dubuque. During the American Civil War, he was in the United States Army, where he served as a First Lieutenant in the JAG Corps from 1862 to 1863. He also served as a Dubuque city councilman.

== Federal judicial service ==
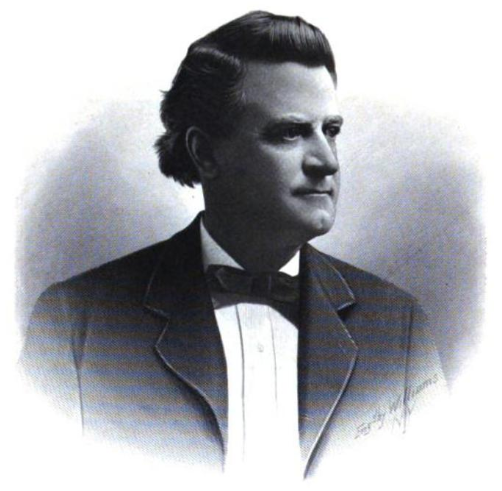

Shiras was nominated by President Chester A. Arthur on August 3, 1882, to the United States District Court for the Northern District of Iowa, to a new seat authorized by 22 Stat. 172. He was confirmed by the United States Senate on August 4, 1882, and received his commission the same day. His service terminated on November 1, 1903, due to his retirement.

== Later career and death ==
Following his retirement from the federal bench, Shiras returned to private practice in Dubuque from 1903 to 1916. He died on January 7, 1916, in Seabreeze, Florida.

== Sources ==
Legal offices
Preceded by Seat established by 22 Stat. 172	Judge of the United States District Court for the Northern District of Iowa; 1882–1903	Succeeded by Henry Thomas Reed
