= William Cook Hanson =

American judge

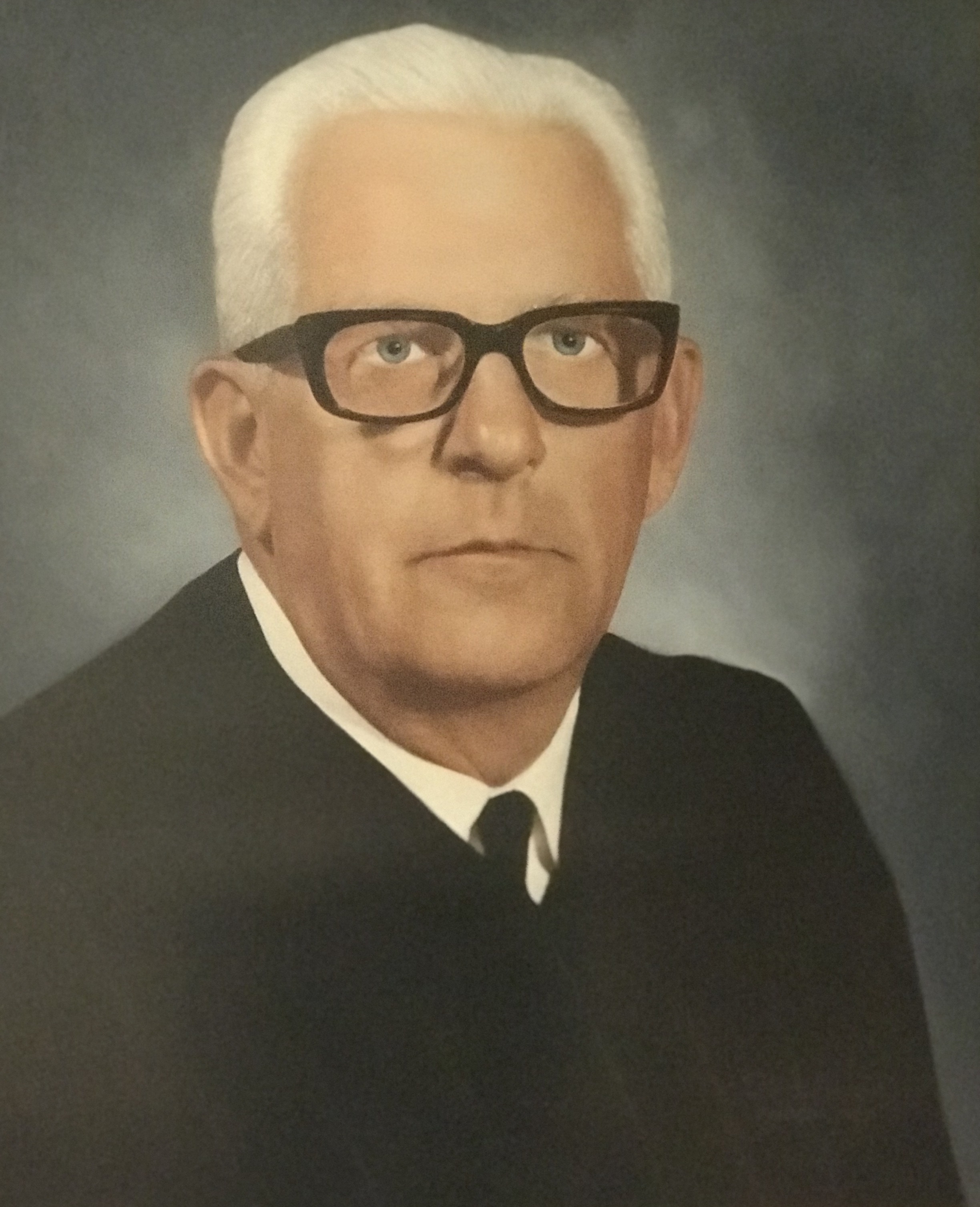
- Hanson's court portrait

Senior Judge of the United States District Court for the Northern District of Iowa Senior Judge of the United States District Court for the Southern District of Iowa
- In office August 15, 1977 – June 6, 1995

Chief Judge of the United States District Court for the Southern District of Iowa
- In office 1971–1977
- Preceded by: Roy Laverne Stephenson
- Succeeded by: William Corwin Stuart

Judge of the United States District Court for the Northern District of Iowa Judge of the United States District Court for the Southern District of Iowa
- In office July 23, 1962 – August 15, 1977
- Appointed by: John F. Kennedy
- Preceded by: Seat established by 75 Stat. 80
- Succeeded by: Donald E. O'Brien

Personal details
- Born: William Cook Hanson; May 14, 1909 Greene County, Iowa, U.S.
- Died: June 6, 1995 (aged 86)
- Education: University of Iowa (B.A.); University of Iowa College of Law (J.D.)

William Cook Hanson (May 14, 1909 – June 6, 1995) was a United States district judge of the United States District Court for the Northern District of Iowa and the United States District Court for the Southern District of Iowa.

== Education and career ==
Born in Greene County, Iowa, Hanson received a Bachelor of Arts degree from the University of Iowa in 1933. He received a Juris Doctor from University of Iowa College of Law in 1935. He was in private practice of law in Jefferson, Iowa from 1935 to 1955. He was county attorney of Greene County from 1939 to 1947. He was a judge of the Iowa District Court for the 16th Judicial District from 1955 to 1962.

== Federal judicial service ==
Hanson was nominated by President John F. Kennedy on June 23, 1962, to the United States District Court for the Northern District of Iowa and the United States District Court for the Southern District of Iowa, to a new joint seat created by 75 Stat. 80. He was confirmed by the United States Senate on July 13, 1962, and received his commission on July 23, 1962. He served as Chief Judge of the Southern District from 1971 to 1977. He assumed senior status on August 15, 1977. His service was terminated on June 6, 1995, due to his death.

== Sources ==
Legal offices
Preceded by Seat established by 75 Stat. 80	Judge of the United States District Court for the Northern District of Iowa; Judge of the United States District Court for the Southern District of Iowa; 1962–1977	Succeeded by Donald E. O'Brien
Preceded by Roy Laverne Stephenson	Chief Judge of the United States District Court for the Southern District of Iowa; 1971–1977	Succeeded by William Corwin Stuart
