= Leif Olson (attorney) =

American lawyer

United States Attorney for the Northern District of Iowa
- Incumbent
- Assumed office October 20, 2025
- President: Donald Trump

Personal details
- Education: Trinity University (BA; University of Chicago Law School (JD)

Leif Olson is an American lawyer serving as the United States Attorney for the Northern District of Iowa since 2025.

== Education ==
Olson received his bachelor's degree from Trinity University and his Juris Doctor degree from the University of Chicago Law School.

== Career ==
Olson served as a law clerk to United States District Judge Lynn N. Hughes before entering private practice. He is a member of the Federalist Society.

=== U.S. Attorney for the Northern District of Iowa ===
On May 6, 2025, Olson was nominated by President Donald Trump to be the United States Attorney for the Northern District of Iowa. He was confirmed by the U.S. Senate on October 7, 2025, and sworn into office on October 20, 2025.

Legal offices
Preceded by	United States Attorney for the Northern District of Iowa; 2025-	Succeeded by Incumbent
