= Peter Deegan =

American attorney (born 1970)

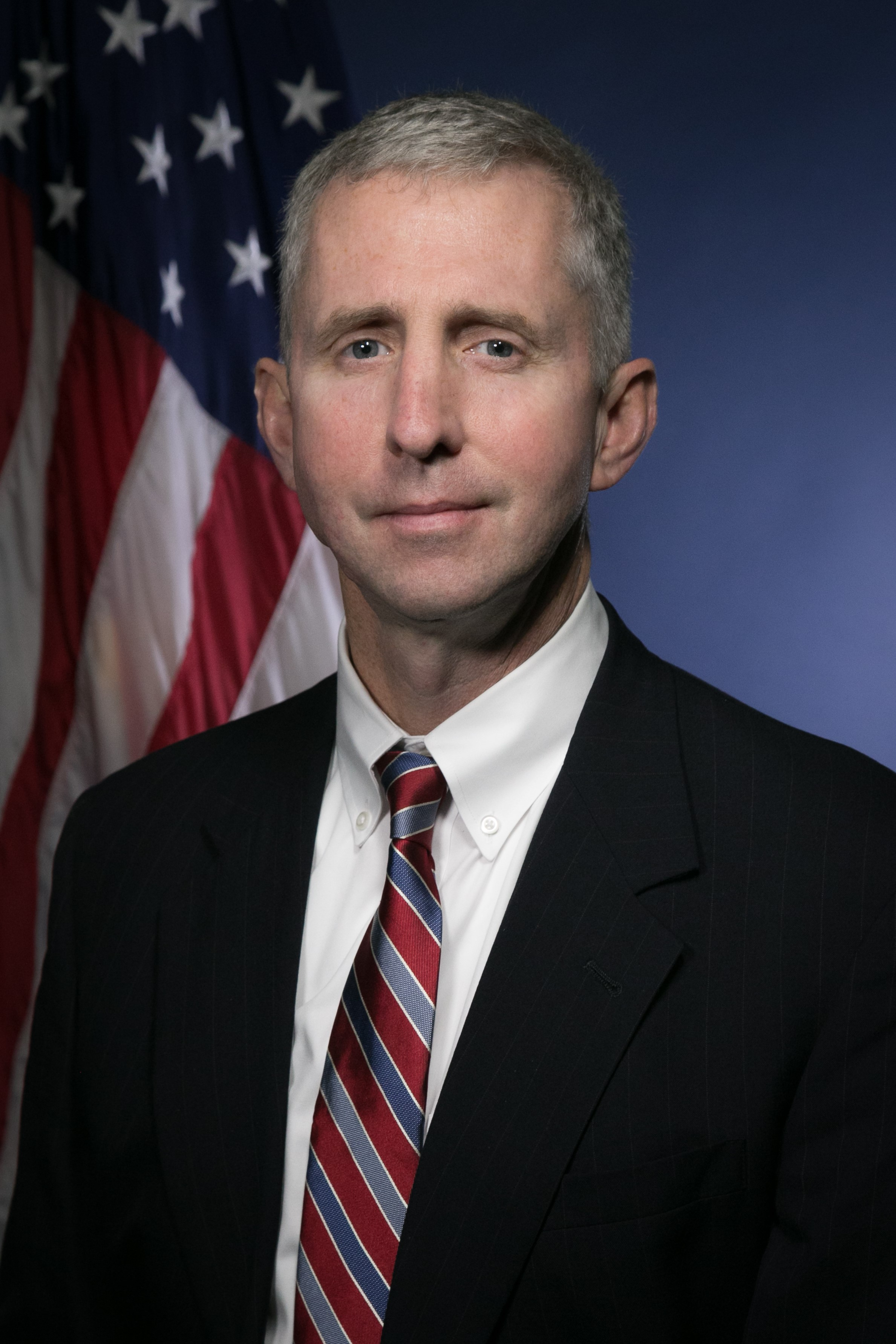

United States Attorney for the Northern District of Iowa
- In office September 21, 2017 – February 17, 2021
- President: Donald Trump; Joe Biden
- Preceded by: Kevin W. Techau
- Succeeded by: Sean R. Berry (acting)

Personal details
- Born: 1970 (age 55–56) Port Huron, Michigan, U.S.
- Party: Republican
- Education: University of Notre Dame (BA); Wayne State University (JD)

Peter Deegan (born 1970) is an American attorney who is a partner at Taft Stettinius & Hollister and was formerly the United States Attorney for the United States District Court for the Northern District of Iowa.

== Education ==
Deegan earned a Bachelor of Arts in philosophy, cum laude, from the University of Notre Dame in 1992 and a Juris Doctor, cum laude, from Wayne State University Law School in 1995. During law school, Deegan worked as a law clerk at DeNardis & Miller, P.C. and Keller Thoma, P.C. Deegan is a registered Republican.

== Legal career ==
Following graduation, Deegan clerked for Lawrence P. Zatkoff of the United States District Court for the Eastern District of Michigan. He then worked briefly at a firm that is now part of Ogletree Deakins in Chicago. Deegan was an Assistant United States Attorney in the Eastern District of Michigan from 2004 to 2006.

From 2006 to 2017 he served as Assistant United States Attorney in the Northern District of Iowa, including a stint as chief of the criminal division beginning in 2015. He was lead counsel in the prosecutions of Russell Wasendorf and Sholom Rubashkin. He also has taught at the University of Iowa College of Law. After being nominated to become a U.S. Attorney by President Donald Trump, Deegan was confirmed unanimously by the United States Senate on September 14, 2017.

On February 8, 2021, he along with 55 other Trump-era attorneys were asked to resign. On February 9, 2021, Deegan announced his resignation effective February 17. Deegan is now a partner at Taft Stettinius & Hollister in Chicago.
