= Mark W. Bennett =

American judge (born 1950)

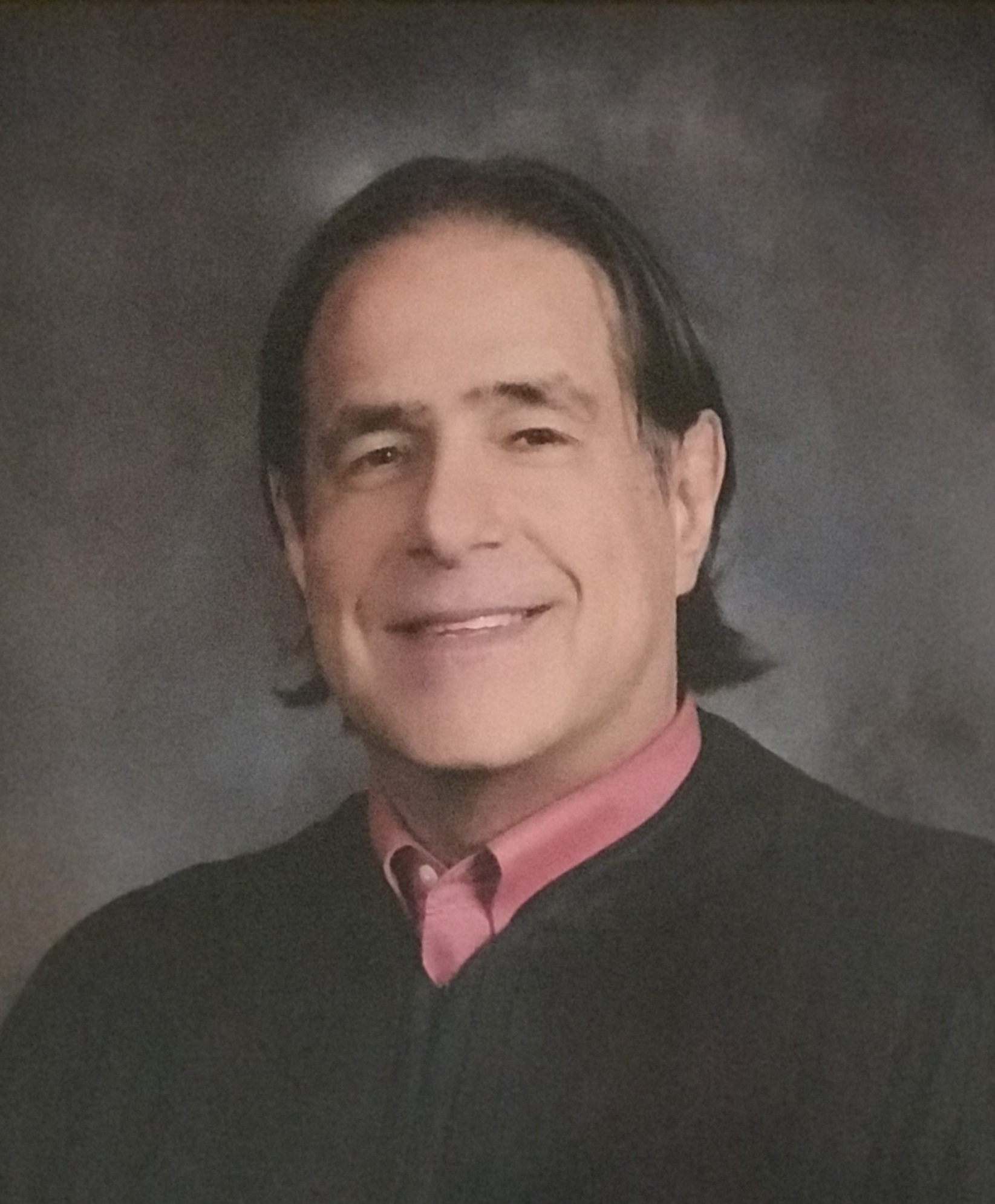
- Bennett's court portrait

Senior Judge of the United States District Court for the Northern District of Iowa
- In office June 4, 2015 – March 2, 2019

Chief Judge of the United States District Court for the Northern District of Iowa
- In office December 31, 1999 – December 30, 2006
- Preceded by: Michael Joseph Melloy
- Succeeded by: Linda R. Reade

Judge of the United States District Court for the Northern District of Iowa
- In office August 26, 1994 – June 4, 2015
- Appointed by: Bill Clinton
- Preceded by: Donald E. O'Brien
- Succeeded by: Leonard T. Strand

Magistrate Judge of the United States District Court for the Southern District of Iowa
- In office 1991 – August 26, 1994

Personal details
- Born: Mark Warren Bennett; June 4, 1950 (age 76) Milwaukee, Wisconsin, U.S.
- Education: Gustavus Adolphus College (BA); Drake University Law School (JD)

Mark Warren Bennett (born June 4, 1950) is a former United States district judge of the United States District Court for the Northern District of Iowa and a professor at Drake University Law School.

== Education ==
Born in Milwaukee, Wisconsin, Bennett grew up in the Twin Cities and received his Bachelor of Arts degree in political science and urban studies from Gustavus Adolphus College in 1972 and a Juris Doctor from Drake University Law School in 1975.

== Legal career ==
Bennett began his own firm, Babich, Bennett, & Nickerson, now known as Babich Goldman, after law school. He was in private practice in Des Moines, Iowa from 1975 to 1991 and also served as general counsel to the Iowa Civil Liberties Union from 1975 to 1989, specializing in employment, civil rights, and constitutional litigation. Bennett argued before the Supreme Court of the United States once and wrote several successful petitions for certiorari. He served on numerous committees for the Iowa State Bar Association and the Iowa Trial Lawyers Association.

== Federal judicial service ==
From 1991 to 1994, Bennett was a United States magistrate judge for the United States District Court for the Southern District of Iowa. On June 21, 1994, Bennett was nominated by President Bill Clinton to a seat on the United States District Court for the Northern District of Iowa vacated by Donald E. O'Brien on recommendation from Tom Harkin. Bennett was confirmed by the United States Senate on August 9, 1994, and received his commission on August 26, 1994. As a district judge, Bennett presided over a federal death penalty trial in the 1993 Iowa murders case. He served as chief judge from 1999 to 2006, and assumed senior status on June 4, 2015. He retired from active service on March 2, 2019.

During his time as a judge, Bennett sat by designation on the United States Court of Appeals for the Eighth Circuit, the United States Court of Appeals for the Ninth Circuit, and many district courts.

=== Sentencing practices ===
Bennett is an outspoken opponent of mandatory minimum sentencing. Several of his decisions opposing the strict application of sentencing laws have been reviewed by the Supreme Court of the United States.

In a 2003 case, Judge Bennett was reversed three separate times by the United States Court of Appeals for the Eighth Circuit for considering post-sentencing rehabilitation when sentencing a defendant who had subsequently recovered from drug addiction and gained stable employment. The Supreme Court then granted certiorari and reversed the Eighth Circuit in 2011, adopting Judge Bennett's position.

In 2007, a divided Eighth Circuit, sitting en banc, reversed Judge Bennett after he refused to apply the 100:1 powder/crack cocaine sentencing disparity. The Eighth Circuit was then reversed by the Supreme Court, which held that district court judges could categorically reject that ratio.

In 2015, when an offender faced a mandatory 30-year sentence, Bennett wished to consider the mandatory minimum when sentencing on its predicate offense, but believed that he could not under Eighth Circuit precedent. The Eighth Circuit affirmed. The Supreme Court granted certiorari and unanimously reversed the Eighth Circuit, holding that Bennett could follow his preferred approach.

Bennett is also notable for his practice of visiting defendants he sentenced in prison; by 2019, he had visited more than 400.

== Academic career ==
Before his time on the bench, Bennett taught courses at Drake University Law School, the University of Iowa College of Law, the University of South Dakota, Western Illinois University, and Des Moines Area Community College.

After retiring from the federal judiciary, Bennett joined the faculty of Drake University Law School, where he is Director of the Institute for Justice Reform and Innovation. He is also a fellow of the New York University School of Law's Civil Jury Project. He has taught at law schools and hundreds of continuing education seminars in 41 states and publishes frequently in the areas of civil procedure and trial advocacy. Bennett's scholarship, especially on implicit bias and the law, has been cited more than one thousand times. Bennett is also a co-author of an employment law treatise and works as an arbitrator and mediator.

Legal offices
| Preceded by Donald E. O'Brien | Judge of the United States District Court for the Northern District of Iowa; 1994–2015 | Succeeded by Leonard T. Strand |
| Preceded by Michael Joseph Melloy | Chief Judge of the United States District Court for the Northern District of Iowa; 1999–2006 | Succeeded by Linda R. Reade |
