= American Journal of Trial Advocacy =

- Discipline: Jurisprudence
- Language: English
- Edited by: Jackson Parker

Publication details
- History: 1977–present
- Publisher: Cumberland School of Law (United States)
- Frequency: Biannually

Standard abbreviations
- Bluebook: Am. J. Trial. Advoc.
- ISO 4: Am. J. Trial Advocacy

Indexing
- ISSN: 0160-0281
- LCCN: 78640932
- OCLC no.: 03486243

Links
- Journal homepage; Online access

The American Journal of Trial Advocacy is a law review edited and published by students at Cumberland School of Law. It was established in 1977 by Dean Donald E. Corely The current editor-in-chief is Austin Foss.

== Editors-in-Chief ==
Prior Editors-in-Chief include (incomplete list):

Volume	Editor-In-Chief
47	Austin R. Foss
46	C. Jackson Parker
45	Cecil G. Nicholson
44	David S. Newman
37	Courtney E. Bailey
