= David R. Hansen =

American judge (born 1938)

David Hansen
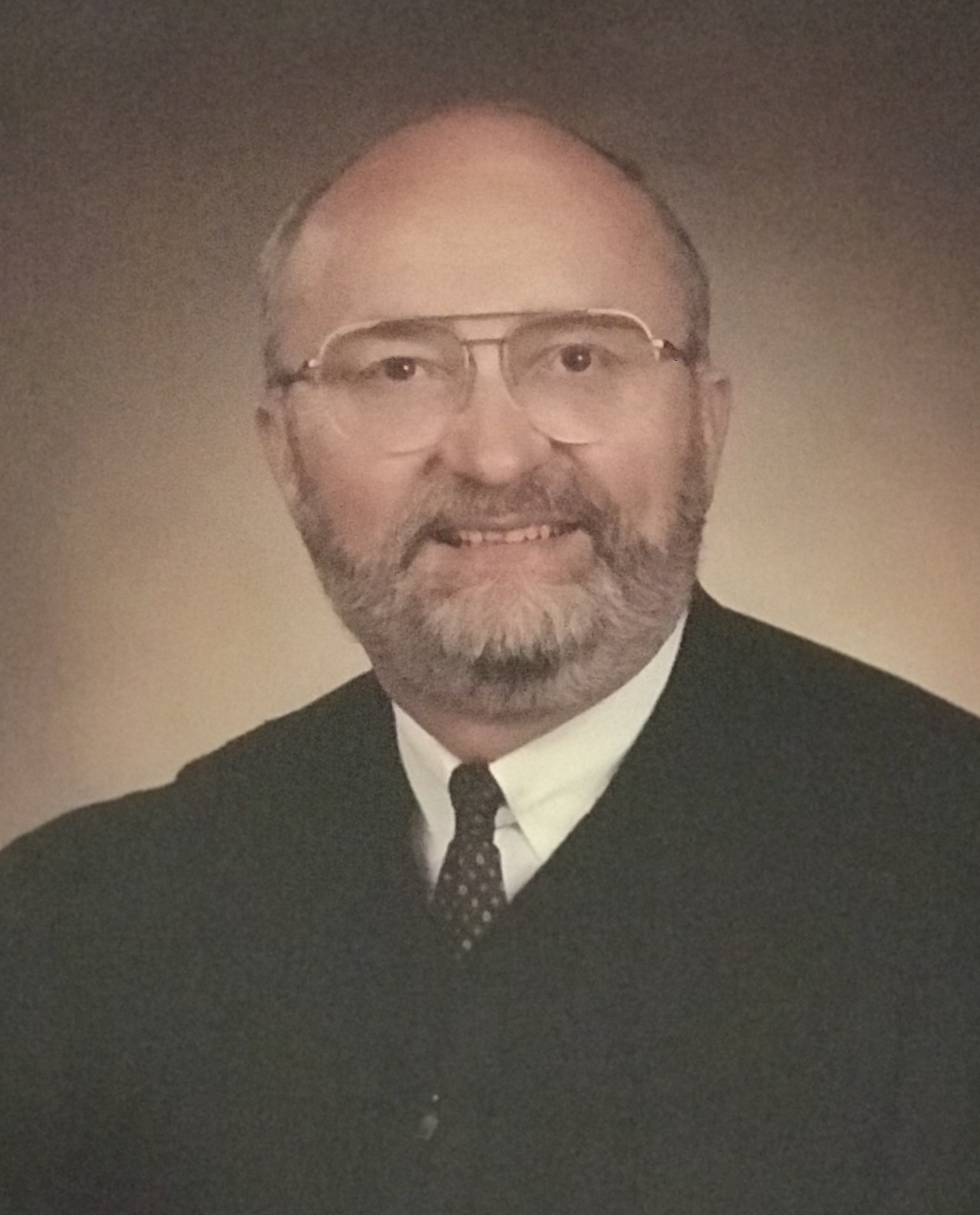
- Hansen's N.D. Iowa court portrait

Senior Judge of the United States Court of Appeals for the Eighth Circuit
- Incumbent
- Assumed office April 1, 2003

Chief Judge of the United States Court of Appeals for the Eighth Circuit
- In office February 1, 2002 – April 1, 2003
- Preceded by: Roger Leland Wollman
- Succeeded by: James B. Loken

Judge of the United States Court of Appeals for the Eighth Circuit
- In office November 18, 1991 – April 1, 2003
- Appointed by: George H. W. Bush
- Preceded by: Seat established
- Succeeded by: Steven Colloton

Judge of the United States District Court for the Northern District of Iowa
- In office March 4, 1986 – November 18, 1991
- Appointed by: Ronald Reagan
- Preceded by: Edward Joseph McManus
- Succeeded by: Michael Joseph Melloy

Personal details
- Born: David Rasmussen Hansen; March 16, 1938 (age 88) Exira, Iowa, U.S.
- Education: Northwest Missouri State University (BA); George Washington University (JD)

Military service
- Allegiance: United States
- Branch/service: United States Army
- Years of service: 1964–1968
- Rank: Captain
- Unit: Army Judge Advocate General's Corps

David Rasmussen Hansen (born March 16, 1938) is a Senior United States circuit judge of the United States Court of Appeals for the Eighth Circuit and a former United States District Judge of the United States District Court for the Northern District of Iowa.

== Early life, education ==
Born in Exira, Iowa, Hansen received a Bachelor of Arts degree from Northwest Missouri State University in 1960, where he was a member of Tau Kappa Epsilon fraternity, and a Juris Doctor from George Washington University Law School in 1963.

== Career ==
He was in private practice in Atlantic, Iowa, from 1963 to 1964. He attended The JAG School at the University of Virginia and entered U.S. Army JAG Corps from 1964 until 1968. He was in private practice in Iowa Falls, Iowa, from 1968 to 1976.

== Judicial career ==
He was a judge on the police court, Iowa Falls, from 1969 to 1973, and was a partner in Win-Gin Farms, in Iowa Falls, Iowa, from 1971 to the present. He was chairman, Hardin County Republican central committee, from 1975 to 1976. He was a judge on the 2nd judicial district, Iowa district court, from 1976 to 1986.

Hansen was a United States district judge of the United States District Court for the Northern District of Iowa. He was nominated by President Ronald Reagan, on February 3, 1986, to a seat vacated by Edward Joseph McManus. He was confirmed by the United States Senate, on March 3, 1986, and received his commission on March 4, 1986. Hansen served in that capacity until November 18, 1991, when he was elevated to the court of appeals.

=== Nomination to the Eighth Circuit ===
Hansen is a United States Circuit Judge of the United States Court of Appeals for the Eighth Circuit. He was nominated by President George H. W. Bush, on July 30, 1991, to a new seat created by 104 Stat. 5089. He was confirmed by the United States Senate, on November 15, 1991, and received his commission on November 18, 1991. He served as Chief Judge, from 2002 to 2003. He assumed senior status on April 1, 2003.

== Sources ==
Legal offices
Preceded by Edward Joseph McManus	Judge of the United States District Court for the Northern District of Iowa; 1986–1991	Succeeded by Michael Joseph Melloy
New seat	Judge of the United States Court of Appeals for the Eighth Circuit; 1991–2003	Succeeded by Steven Colloton
Preceded by Roger Leland Wollman	Chief Judge of the United States Court of Appeals for the Eighth Circuit; 2002–2003	Succeeded by James B. Loken
