= Ann Colloton =

American swimmer

Personal information
- Born: Iowa City, Iowa, United States
- Education: University of Michigan

Sport
- Sport: Swimming

Ann Colloton is a former competitive swimmer. She was a five-time Big Ten Conference champion, an eight-time All-American, and the NCAA breaststroke champion in 1989. She was the first athlete in University of Michigan history to be twice named female athlete of the year and was also named Michigan's Female Athlete of the Decade for the 1980s. She was inducted into the University of Michigan Athletic Hall of Honor in February 2008.

Colloton is the daughter of John W. Colloton, former longtime Director and CEO for the University of Iowa Hospitals and Clinics. She is the sister of Steven Colloton, Chief Judge of the United States Court of Appeals for the Eighth Circuit.

== Competitive swimmer ==
A native of Iowa City, Iowa, Colloton attended Iowa City West High School, and was a seven-time Iowa state swimming champion who went on to star at the University of Michigan from 1987-1990. With Colloton on the team, the Michigan women's swim team won 35 of 36 dual meets and claimed four consecutive Big Ten Conference championships from 1987-1990. Colloton was a five-time Big Ten champion and eight-time All-American. Her 200-yard breaststroke dominance resulted in three Big Ten individual titles (1988–90) and an NCAA championship in 1989. Her NCAA championship came in March 1989 at the Indiana University Natatorium where she swam the 200-yard breaststroke in 2:12.96 to beat Jill Johnson of Stanford by .15 seconds.

== Awards and honors ==
Colloton was named the University of Michigan's female athlete of the year in 1989 and 1990, becoming the first athlete (male or female) in school history to receive the athlete of the year award more than once. Only two others have matched the feat: swimmer Tom Dolan (male athlete of the year, 1995–96) and softball player Jennie Ritter (female athlete of the year, 2005–06). In 1992, Colloton was also named Michigan's Female Athlete of the Decade for the 1980s as part of the Big Ten's celebration of women's sports. Colloton was also a three-time Academic All-Big Ten Conference honoree and the recipient of an NCAA Postgraduate Scholarship recipient in 1990. She was inducted into the University of Michigan Athletic Hall of Honor in February 2008.

== See also ==
- University of Michigan Athletic Hall of Honor
