= Donald E. O'Brien =

American judge (1923–2015)

Donald Eugene O'Brien
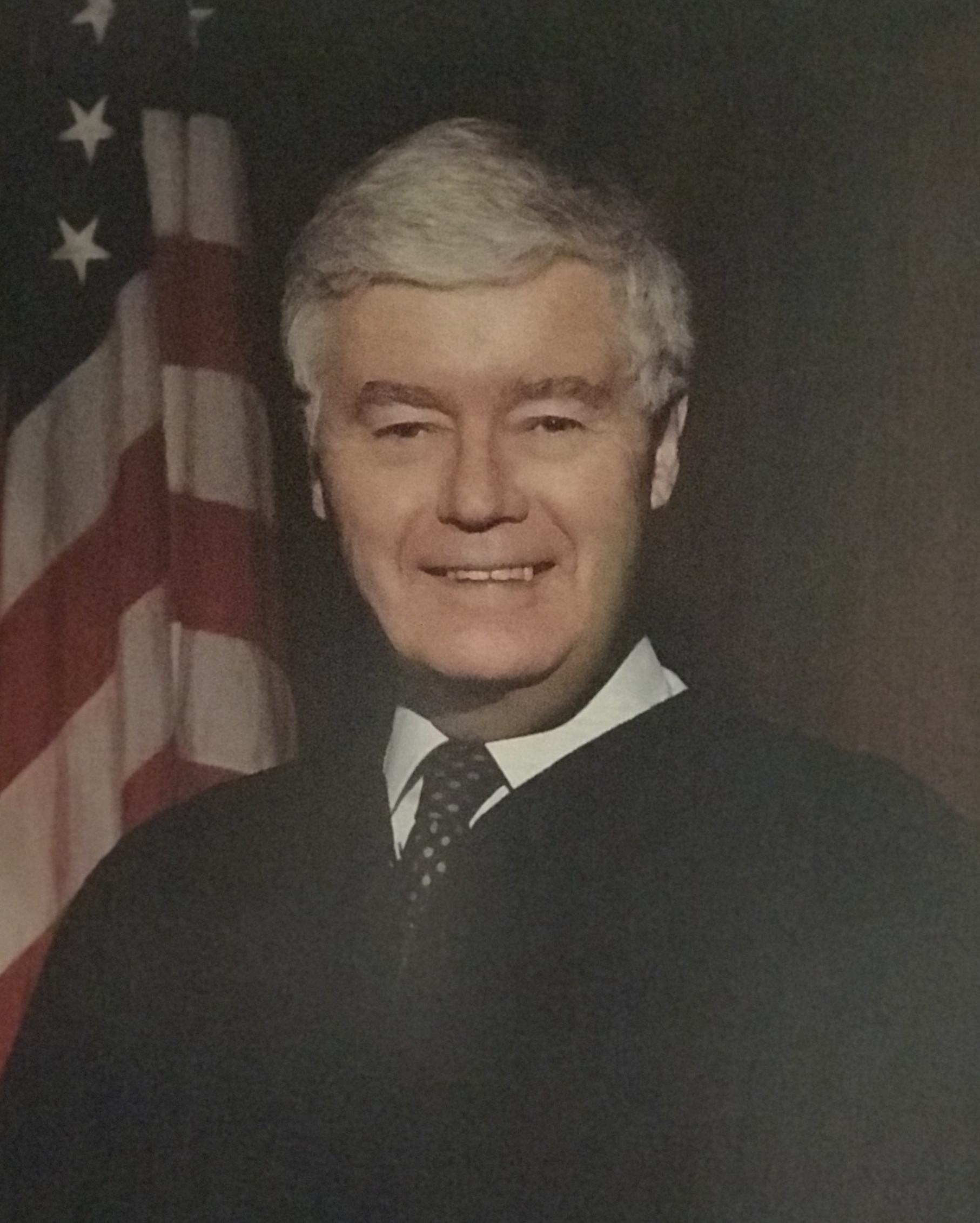

Senior Judge of the United States District Court for the Northern District of Iowa
- In office December 30, 1992 – August 18, 2015

Chief Judge of the United States District Court for the Northern District of Iowa
- In office 1985–1992
- Preceded by: Edward Joseph McManus
- Succeeded by: Michael Joseph Melloy

Judge of the United States District Court for the Northern District of Iowa
- In office October 5, 1978 – December 30, 1992
- Appointed by: Jimmy Carter
- Preceded by: William Cook Hanson
- Succeeded by: Mark W. Bennett

Judge of the United States District Court for the Southern District of Iowa
- In office October 5, 1978 – December 1, 1990
- Appointed by: Jimmy Carter
- Preceded by: William Cook Hanson
- Succeeded by: Seat abolished

United States Attorney for the Northern District of Iowa
- In office 1961–1967
- Appointed by: John F. Kennedy

Personal details
- Born: Donald Eugene O'Brien; September 30, 1923 Marcus, Iowa, U.S.
- Died: August 18, 2015 (aged 91) Sioux City, Iowa, U.S.
- Party: Democratic
- Education: Creighton University School of Law (LLB)

Military service
- Allegiance: United States
- Branch/service: United States Army Air Corps
- Years of service: 1942–1945
- Rank: Lieutenant
- Awards: Distinguished Flying Cross

Donald Eugene O'Brien (September 30, 1923 – August 18, 2015) was a United States district judge of the United States District Court for the Northern District of Iowa and the United States District Court for the Southern District of Iowa. He was an officer in the United States Army Air Corps in World War II, a Democratic nominee for the United States House of Representatives, a United States Attorney, and a political organizer.

== Education and career ==
O'Brien was born in Marcus, Iowa to Michael J. and Myrtle O'Brien on September 30, 1923. He interrupted his college coursework at Trinity College in Sioux City, Iowa to serve as a lieutenant in the United States Army Air Corps from 1942 to 1945. He flew 30 bombing missions over Europe and receiving the Distinguished Flying Cross. After completing his undergraduate studies at Trinity College, he entered Creighton University School of Law, graduating in 1948 with a Bachelor of Laws. He was in private practice in Sioux City from 1948 to 1949, before becoming an assistant city attorney of Sioux City in 1949. He married Ruth Mahon in 1950. In 1952 he chaired the Adlai Stevenson's presidential campaign in his Iowa congressional district. After serving as the County Attorney of Woodbury County, Iowa from 1955 to 1958, he served as a Sioux City municipal judge from 1959 to 1960.

In 1958 and again in 1960 O'Brien was the Democratic nominee to represent Iowa's 8th congressional district in the United States House of Representatives, but lost both races to longtime Republican incumbent Charles B. Hoeven. In 1961 President John F. Kennedy appointed him the United States Attorney for the Northern District of Iowa, a position he held until 1967. Soon after leaving office, he became an advance man in the 1968 presidential campaigns of Robert F. Kennedy, then George McGovern, and later Hubert H. Humphrey. He was in private practice in Sioux City from 1967 to 1978. He organized McGovern's general election campaign in Southern California in 1972 and Jimmy Carter's general election campaign in Michigan in 1976. In 1977 he served as special counsel to a subcommittee of the United States House Committee on Small Business for its investigation of anti-competitive practices in the meat industry.

== Federal judicial service ==
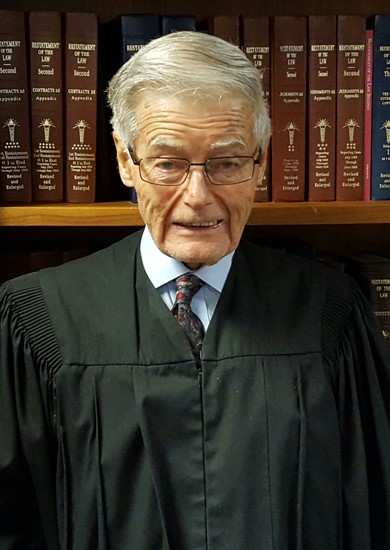
O'Brien in the 2010s

From 1962 to 1979 Iowa had three federal district judges — one in the United States District Court for the Northern District of Iowa, one in the United States District Court for the Southern District of Iowa, and a third serving both Districts. On September 27, 1978 Carter nominated O'Brien to succeed Judge William C. Hanson in the third of those positions. O'Brien was confirmed by the United States Senate on October 4, 1978, and received his commission on October 5, 1978. O'Brien presided in the western and central divisions of both Districts until December 1, 1990, when he began to serve exclusively in the Northern District as a new judgeship was added in the Southern District. He served as Chief Judge of the Northern District from 1985 to 1992. O'Brien assumed senior status on December 30, 1992, and continued to preside over cases from chambers in Sioux City, until his death on August 18, 2015, in Sioux City.

== Sources ==
- Neil Miller, Sex-Crime Panic: A Journey to the Paranoid Heart of the 1950s (NY: Alyson Books, 2002)

Legal offices
Preceded by William Cook Hanson	Judge of the United States District Court for the Northern District of Iowa; 1978–1992	Succeeded by Mark W. Bennett
Preceded by William Cook Hanson	Judge of the United States District Court for the Southern District of Iowa; 1978–1990	Succeeded by Seat abolished
Preceded by Edward Joseph McManus	Chief Judge of the United States District Court for the Northern District of Iowa; 1985–1992	Succeeded by Michael Joseph Melloy
