= Leonard T. Strand =

American judge (born 1965)

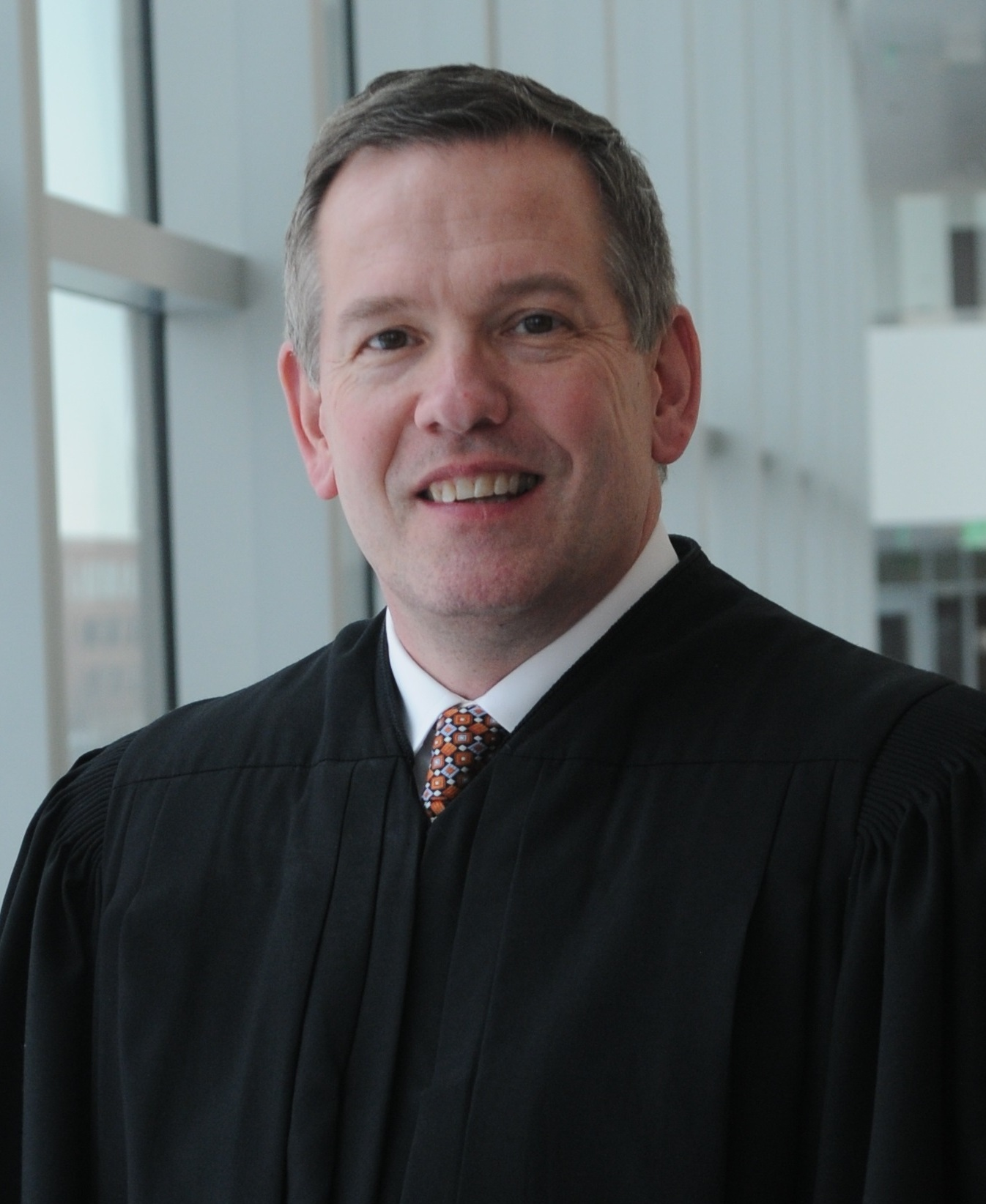
- Strand in 2019

Chief Judge of the United States District Court for the Northern District of Iowa
- In office February 12, 2017 – February 12, 2024
- Preceded by: Linda R. Reade
- Succeeded by: C. J. Williams

Judge of the United States District Court for the Northern District of Iowa
- Incumbent
- Assumed office February 12, 2016
- Appointed by: Barack Obama
- Preceded by: Mark W. Bennett

Magistrate Judge of the United States District Court for the Northern District of Iowa
- In office June 7, 2012 – February 12, 2016
- Succeeded by: C. J. Williams

Personal details
- Born: July 14, 1965 (age 60) Sioux City, Iowa, U.S.
- Education: University of Iowa (BA, JD)

Leonard Terry Strand (born July 14, 1965) is a United States district judge of the United States District Court for the Northern District of Iowa and a former United States magistrate judge of the same court.

== Education ==
Strand was born on July 14, 1965, raised in Sioux City, Iowa, and graduated from West High School as valedictorian. He received a Bachelor of Arts degree, with high distinction and Phi Beta Kappa, in 1987 from the University of Iowa. He received a Juris Doctor, with highest distinction, first in his class, and Order of the Coif, in 1990 from the University of Iowa College of Law. During law school, he worked at Vinson & Elkins in Houston and Simmons Perrine Moyer Bergman in Cedar Rapids and also contributed to The Journal of Corporation Law.

== Career ==
After graduating from law school, Strand joined Simmons Perrine Moyer Bergman as an associate. He was a partner at the firm from 1996 to 2012. During his service with the firm, he specialized in commercial litigation and employment law and served on the firm's management committee. He was also briefly an arbitrator for the American Arbitration Association.

=== Federal judicial service ===
From June 7, 2012, to February 12, 2016, Strand served as a United States magistrate judge for the Northern District of Iowa.

On July 21, 2015, President Barack Obama, at the recommendation of Senator Chuck Grassley, nominated Strand to serve as a United States district judge of the United States District Court for the Northern District of Iowa, to the seat vacated by Judge Mark W. Bennett, who assumed senior status on June 4, 2015. He received a hearing before the United States Senate Judiciary Committee on October 21, 2015. On November 5, 2015, his nomination was reported out of committee by voice vote. On February 11, 2016, the United States Senate confirmed his nomination by a 93–0 vote. He received his commission on February 12, 2016. Strand's investiture occurred on April 21, 2016. He served as the chief judge from February 12, 2017 to February 12, 2024.

Legal offices
Preceded by Mark W. Bennett	Judge of the United States District Court for the Northern District of Iowa; 2016–present	Incumbent
Preceded by Linda R. Reade	Chief Judge of the United States District Court for the Northern District of Iowa; 2017–2024	Succeeded by C. J. Williams
