= John W. Colloton =

American hospital administrator (1931–2025)

John W. Colloton (1931 – November 14, 2025) was an American hospital administrator who was chief executive of the University of Iowa Hospitals and Clinics from 1971 to 1993. There he initiated "Project Art", a program which from 1975 installed works of art in the hallways of the hospital. Colloton became a "director emeritus" in 2001.

In 1979, he was elected chairman of the National Council of Teaching Hospitals.

Colloton died on November 14, 2025, at the age of 94. His son Steven Colloton is a judge and his daughter Ann Colloton is a former competitive swimmer.

== Awards and recognition ==
Colloton received a Horatio Alger Award in 2002, and in 2013 received an honorary degree from the University of Iowa. He was presented with a Hancher-Finkbine Alumni Medallion in 2016.
