= United States District Court for the Northern District of Iowa =

United States federal district court in Iowa

Coordinates: 41°58′21.3″N 91°39′50.7″W

- (N.D. Iowa)

- The Northern (shades of red) and Southern (shades of blue) Districts of Iowa
- Location: Cedar Rapids More locations: Federal Building and United States Courthouse (Sioux City); Dubuque; Waterloo; Fort Dodge; Mason City
- Appeals to: Eighth Circuit
- Established: July 20, 1882
- Judges: 2
- Chief Judge: C. J. Williams

Officers of the court
- U.S. Attorney: Leif Olson
- U.S. Marshal: Chris Barther (acting)
- www.iand.uscourts.gov

The United States District Court for the Northern District of Iowa (in case citations, N.D. Iowa) has jurisdiction over fifty-two of Iowa's ninety-nine counties. It is subject to the Eighth Circuit Court of Appeals (except for patent claims and claims against the U.S. government under the Tucker Act, which are appealed to the Federal Circuit).

The United States District Court for the District of Iowa, established on March 3, 1845, by 5 Stat. 789, was subdivided into the current Northern and Southern Districts on July 20, 1882, by 22 Stat. 172.

Presently, the court has two district judges, Chief Judge Leonard T. Strand and Judge C. J. Williams, one senior judge, Linda R. Reade, and two magistrate judges, Kelly Mahoney and Mark A. Roberts.

The court is headquartered in Cedar Rapids, with a satellite courthouse in Sioux City.

== Jurisdiction ==
Federal judicial districts and divisions in Iowa. Northern District of Iowa Western Division Central Division Eastern Division Cedar Rapids Division Southern District of Iowa Western Division Central Division Davenport Division

The Northern District of Iowa has four court divisions, each covering the following counties:

The Cedar Rapids Division, covering Benton, Cedar, Grundy, Hardin, Iowa, Jones, Linn, and Tama counties.

The Central Division, covering Butler, Calhoun, Carroll, Cerro Gordo, Emmet, Franklin, Hamilton, Hancock, Humboldt, Kossuth, Palo Alto, Pocahontas, Webster, Winnebago, Worth, and Wright counties.

The Eastern Division, covering Allamakee, Black Hawk, Bremer, Buchanan, Chickasaw, Clayton, Delaware, Dubuque, Fayette, Floyd, Howard, Jackson, Mitchell, and Winneshiek counties.

The Western Division, covering Buena Vista, Cherokee, Clay, Crawford, Dickinson, Ida, Lyon, Monona, O'Brien, Osceola, Plymouth, Sac, Sioux, and Woodbury counties.

== Current judges ==
As of February 12, 2024:

#	Title	Judge	Duty station	Born	Term of service			Appointed by
#	Title	Judge	Duty station	Born	Active	Chief	Senior	Appointed by
13	Chief Judge	C. J. Williams	Cedar Rapids	1963	2018–present	2024–present	—	Trump
12	District Judge	Leonard T. Strand	Sioux City	1965	2016–present	2017–2024	—	Obama
11	Senior Judge	Linda R. Reade	Cedar Rapids	1948	2002–2017	2007–2017	2017–present	G.W. Bush

== Former judges ==
#	Judge	Born–died	Active service	Chief Judge	Senior status	Appointed by	Reason for termination
1	Oliver Perry Shiras	1833–1916	1882–1903	—	—	Arthur	retirement
2	Henry Thomas Reed	1846–1924	1904–1921	—	1921–1924	T. Roosevelt	death
3	George Cromwell Scott	1864–1948	1922–1943	—	1943–1948	Harding	death
4	Henry Norman Graven	1893–1970	1944–1961	1961	1961–1970	F. Roosevelt	death
5	Edward Joseph McManus	1920–2017	1962–1985	1962–1985	1985–2017	Kennedy	death
6	William Cook Hanson	1909–1995	1962–1977 (Note: Jointly appointed to the Northern and Southern Districts of Iowa.)	—	1977–1995	Kennedy	death
7	Donald E. O'Brien	1923–2015	1978–1992 (Note: From 1978–1990, Judge O’Brien was jointly appointed to the Northern and Southern Districts of Iowa.)	1985–1992	1992–2015	Carter	death
8	David R. Hansen	1938–present	1986–1991	—	—	Reagan	elevation
9	Michael Joseph Melloy	1948–2026	1992–2002	1992–1999	—	G.H.W. Bush	elevation
10	Mark W. Bennett	1950–present	1994–2015	1999–2006	2015–2019	Clinton	retirement

== Chief judges ==
Chief judges have administrative responsibilities with respect to their district court. Unlike the Supreme Court, where one justice is specifically nominated to be chief, the office of chief judge rotates among the district court judges. To be chief, a judge must have been in active service on the court for at least one year, be under the age of 65, and have not previously served as chief judge.

A vacancy is filled by the judge highest in seniority among the group of qualified judges. The chief judge serves for a term of seven years, or until age 70, whichever occurs first. The age restrictions are waived if no members of the court would otherwise be qualified for the position.

When the office was created in 1948, the chief judge was the longest-serving judge who had not elected to retire, on what has since 1958 been known as senior status, or declined to serve as chief judge. After August 6, 1959, judges could not become or remain chief after turning 70 years old. The current rules have been in operation since October 1, 1982.

== Succession of seats ==
Seat 1
Seat established on July 20, 1882 by 22 Stat. 172
Shiras	1882–1903
Reed	1904–1921
Scott	1922–1943
Graven	1944–1961
McManus	1962–1985
Hansen	1986–1991
Melloy	1992–2002
Reade	2002–2017
Williams	2018–present

Seat 2
Seat established on May 19, 1961 by 75 Stat. 80 (concurrent with Southern District)
Hanson	1962–1977
Seat reassigned solely to Northern District on December 1, 1990 by 104 Stat. 5089
O'Brien	1978–1992
Bennett	1994–2015
Strand	2016–present

== U.S. Attorneys ==
- Maurice D. O'Connell 1883-86
- Timothy P. Murphy 1886-90
- Maurice D. O'Connell 1890-94
- Cato Sells 1894-98
- Horace G. McMillan 1898-1907
- Frederick F. Faville 1907-13
- Anthony Van Wagenen 1913-14
- Frank A. O'Connor 1914-21
- Guy P. Linville 1921-27
- Bennett E. Rhinehart 1927-31
- Harry M. Reed 1931-34
- Edward G. Dunn 1934-40
- Tobias E. Diamond 1940-52
- Michael L. Mason 1952-53
- F. G. Van Alstine 1953-61
- Donald E. O'Brien 1961-67
- Steve Turner 1967
- Asher E. Schroeder 1967-69
- Evan L. Hultman 1969-77
- James H. Reynolds 1977-82
- Evan L. Hultman 1982-86
- Robert L. Teig 1986
- Charles W. Larson, Sr. 1986-93
- Robert L. Teig 1993
- Stephen J. Rapp 1993-2001
- Charles W. Larson, Sr. 2001-2006
- Judith A. Whetstine 2007
- Matt M. Dummermuth 2007-2009
- Stephanie M. Rose 2009-2012
- Sean R. Berry 2012-2014
- Kevin W. Techau 2014-2017
- Peter Deegan 2017-2021
- Sean R. Berry 2021-2022
- Timothy T. Duax 2022-2025
- Leif Olson 2025 - Present

== See also ==
- Courts of Iowa
- List of current United States district judges
- List of United States federal courthouses in Iowa
