= Julius A. Nelson =

American politician (1872–1955)

Julius A. Nelson (January 14, 1872 – July 24, 1955) was an American politician.

Nelson, of Danish descent, was born on January 14, 1872, in Cass County, Iowa. He completed primary education from country schools in Cass and Audubon counties, and later trained at a normal school and studied at a business college. In 1902, Nelson married Elizabeth Brown, with whom he raised three one daughter and two sons. He was vice president of Farmers Savings Bank, and president of the Building Supply Company, both in Atlantic.

Politically, Nelson was affiliated with the Republican Party, and served as a Cass County trustee and secretary-treasurer of the Atlantic school board before winning his first election to the Iowa Senate in 1918. In total, Nelson was elected to represent District 18 for two consecutive terms, until 1927.

On July 24, 1955, Nelson died at the Atlantic Memorial Hospital, aged 83.
