= Carl Reed =

American politician (1873–1959)

Carl Webster Reed (May 6, 1873 – December 15, 1959) was an American lawyer and politician.

Carl Reed was born to Henry Thomas Reed and his wife Laura Webster Reed on May 6, 1873, in Cresco, Iowa. After graduating from Cresco High School in 1892, Carl Reed attended the University of Wisconsin and completed his legal studies at the University of Minnesota Law School in 1896. Carl Reed worked in his father's law office from 1892 to 1904, excepting 1895, eventually becoming partner. After T. H. Reed was appointed to a district judgeship, the Reeds' legal practice became a solo endeavor for Carl. In December 1910, Carl Reed entered a legal partnership with Charles Pergler.

Like his father, Carl Reed was a member of the Republican Party. Reed served as Cresco city attorney from 1896 to 1902, as a member of the Cresco city council between 1911 and 1914, and was the Howard County attorney from 1915 to 1919. Reed was subsequently elected to two full terms on the Iowa Senate, representing District 42 from January 13, 1919 to January 9, 1927. Carl Reed was appointed a judge of Iowa's thirteenth judicial district in 1926. In 1938, he began practicing law with one of his sons, Henry F. Reed. In 1940, Carl Reed won the first of two terms on the State Commerce Commission, and moved to Des Moines. He stepped down in 1948, and declined to run for another term in 1956.

Carl Reed married Alice Mathilda Swenson on July 14, 1909. The couple raised three children: June Carlisle Reed, Henry Frederick Reed, and Richard Carl Reed. Carl W. Reed died in Des Moines on December 15, 1959.
