= Nicholas A. Klinefeldt =

American attorney

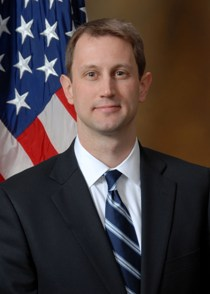
- Official portrait, 2009

United States Attorney for the Southern District of Iowa
- In office November 25, 2009 – November 15, 2015
- President: Barack Obama
- Preceded by: Matthew Whitaker
- Succeeded by: Marc Krickbaum

Personal details
- Born: 1974 (age 51–52) Des Moines, Iowa, U.S.
- Education: University of Iowa (BA, JD)

Nicholas Arthur Klinefeldt (born 1974) is an American attorney who served as the United States Attorney for the Southern District of Iowa from 2009 to 2015.

== Education ==
Klinefeldt was born in 1974 in Des Moines, Iowa. He attended received a Bachelor of Arts with honors in 1995 from the University of Iowa and a Juris Doctor with distinction in 2000 from the University of Iowa College of Law. He was the Note & Comment Editor of the Journal of Gender, Race, & Justice. Between his degrees, Kleinfeldt worked for Tom Harkin. During law school, he worked for the Federal Public Defender in Des Moines and at Tindal, Erdahl, Goddard, & Nestor in Iowa City.

== Legal career ==
Following law school, Klinefeldt clerked for Robert W. Pratt of the United States District Court for the Southern District of Iowa and for Christopher Armstrong and Benjamin Kaplan of the Massachusetts Appeals Court. He then worked in Boston at LibbyHoopes P.C. before returning to Iowa to work as counsel to the Barack Obama 2008 presidential campaign and the Iowa Democratic Party. From 2006 to 2009, he was an associate at Ahlers & Cooney, a firm in Des Moines. He was also a member of the American Constitution Society.

From 2009 to 2015, Klinefeldt served as United States Attorney for the Southern District of Iowa, to which he was nominated by Barack Obama.

Following his service as U.S. Attorney, Klinefeldt joined the Des Moines office of Faegre Drinker, where he is the co-leader of the firm's white-collar criminal defense practice.
