= Stephanie M. Rose =

American judge (born 1972)

Stephanie Rose
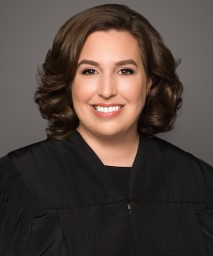

Chief Judge of the United States District Court for the Southern District of Iowa
- Incumbent
- Assumed office February 10, 2022
- Preceded by: John Alfred Jarvey

Judge of the United States District Court for the Southern District of Iowa
- Incumbent
- Assumed office September 17, 2012
- Appointed by: Barack Obama
- Preceded by: Robert W. Pratt

United States Attorney of the Northern District of Iowa
- In office November 24, 2009 – September 17, 2012
- Appointed by: Barack Obama
- Preceded by: Charles Larson
- Succeeded by: Kevin W. Techau

Personal details
- Born: Stephanie Marie King; 1972 (age 53–54) Topeka, Kansas, U.S.
- Education: University of Iowa (BA, JD)

Stephanie Marie Rose (née King; born 1972) is the chief United States district judge of the United States District Court for the Southern District of Iowa. She is the first female judge to serve in the Southern District.

== Early life and education ==
Rose was born Stephanie Marie King in Topeka, Kansas in 1972. She graduated from Mason City High School in Mason City, Iowa. She received her Bachelor of Arts degree in journalism and sociology in 1994 from the University of Iowa with highest distinction. She received her Juris Doctor in 1996 from the University of Iowa College of Law with high distinction and was a member of the Order of the Coif. During law school, she worked at Bradley & Riley, a law firm in Cedar Rapids. She also worked as a journalist for newspapers in Mason City, Iowa City, and Webster City from 1989 to 1994, including a stint as a dirt track racing correspondent.

== Career ==
Rose served over 12 years as an assistant United States attorney. She was deputy criminal chief from 2008 to 2009. During her tenure she has investigated and prosecuted over 800 federal criminal cases, including leading a major internet pharmacy prosecution coordinated with 48 other offices. She has also done pro bono work as a court appointed special advocate for abused and neglected children. She also volunteered her services to represent domestic violence victims. From 2009 to 2012, Rose served as United States attorney for the Northern District of Iowa. She tried 33 criminal cases. She led a major multi-jurisdictional pharmaceutical fraud case involving 49 U.S. Attorneys' offices and 36 law enforcement agencies; the case resulted in convictions in the Northern District for 26 defendants.

Rose's work in the U.S. attorney's office has involved some controversy surrounding the Postville Raid and the conviction and sentence of Agriprocessors kosher slaughterhouse chief Sholom Rubashkin of Postville, Iowa on 86 financial fraud-related federal charges and his subsequent 27-year sentence in federal prison. Prosecutors, led by Rose, initially had sought a life sentence for Rubashkin, but later agreed to seek 25 years after the life sentence request was criticized by former Justice Department officials including six former Attorneys General.

=== Federal judicial service ===
On February 2, 2012, President Barack Obama nominated Rose to be United States District Judge for the United States District Court for the Southern District of Iowa. She replaced Judge Robert W. Pratt, who assumed senior status on July 1, 2012, and was recommended for the position by Tom Harkin. The American Bar Association rated her unanimously well-qualified. Rose received a hearing before the Senate Judiciary Committee on March 14, 2012 and her nomination was reported to the floor on April 19, 2012, by voice vote, with Senator Mike Lee recorded as voting no. On September 10, 2012, the Senate confirmed her nomination by a 89–1 vote, Senator DeMint casting the sole no vote. She received her commission on September 17, 2012.

At the time of her confirmation, Rose was the youngest Article III federal judge in the country. She oversaw the case of Mo Hailong, who was convicted of economic espionage against Pioneer Hi Bred International and Monsanto after extensive pretrial litigation. Rose became chief judge on February 10, 2022.

== See also ==
- List of first women lawyers and judges in Iowa

Legal offices
| Preceded by Robert W. Pratt | Judge of the United States District Court for the Southern District of Iowa; 2012–present | Incumbent |
| Preceded by John Alfred Jarvey | Chief Judge of the United States District Court for the Southern District of Iowa; 2022–present | Incumbent |
