= David Waterman =

American lawyer

David C. Waterman
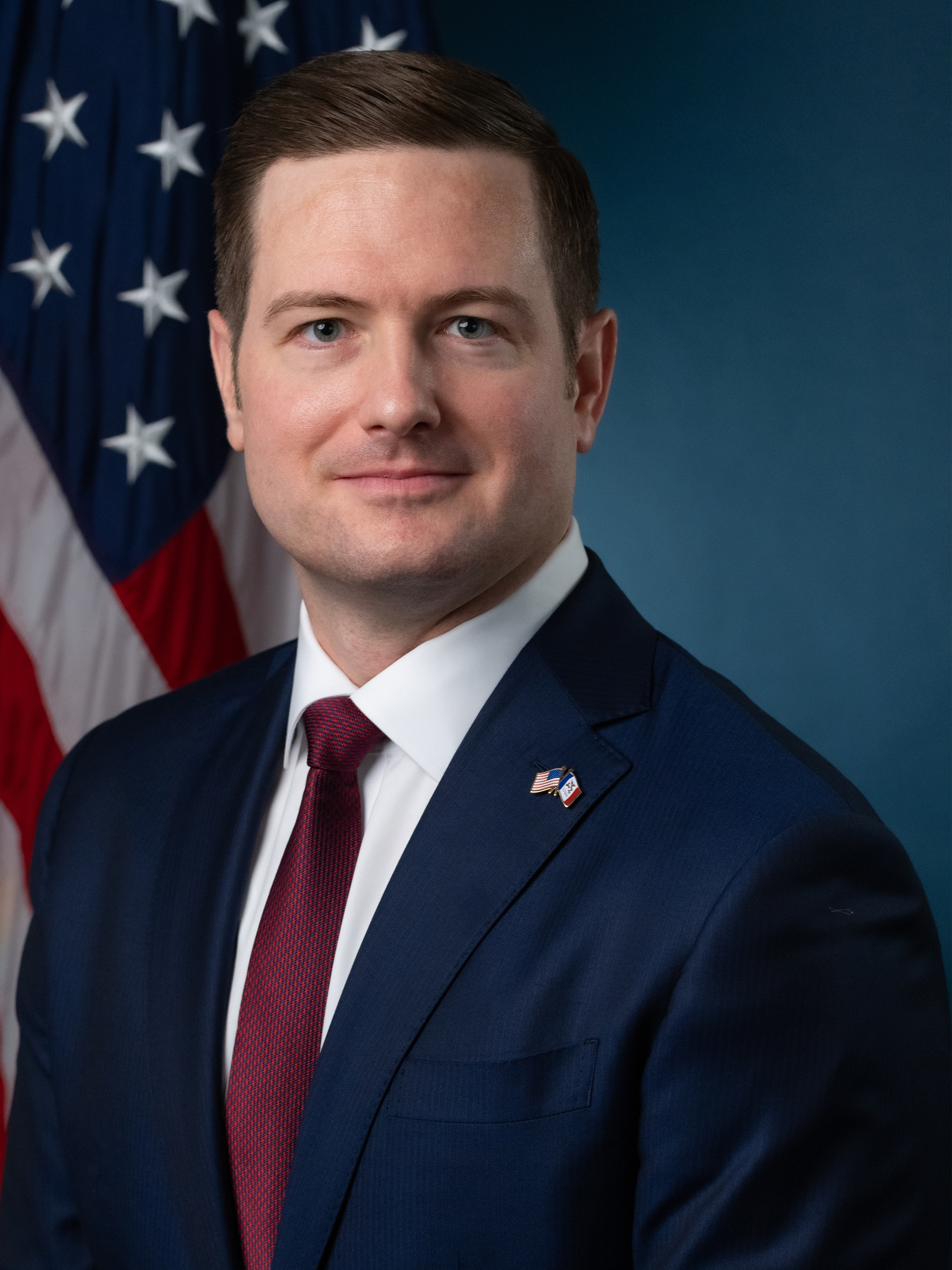

United States Attorney for the District of Southern Iowa
- Incumbent
- Assumed office October 15, 2025
- President: Donald Trump
- Preceded by: Richard D. Westphal

Personal details
- Education: George Washington University (BA); University of Cambridge (MPhil); UCLA School of Law (JD)

David Charles Waterman is an American lawyer serving as the United States Attorney for the District of Southern Iowa since 2025.

== Education ==
Waterman earned his bachelor's degree in political science, summa cum laude and Phi Beta Kappa, from the George Washington University Honors Program in 2009, where he studied abroad for the 2007 to 2008 academic year at the University of Oxford. He then attended the University of Cambridge where he was awarded a master's degree in political thought and intellectual history in 2010. He received his JD from the UCLA School of Law in 2013.

== Career ==
Waterman clerked for John Alfred Jarvey of the U.S. District Court for the Southern District of Iowa, Mark W. Bennett of the U.S. District Court for the Northern District of Iowa, and Michael Joseph Melloy of the U.S. Court of Appeals for the Eighth Circuit. From 2016 to 2020, Waterman served as an Assistant U.S. Attorney at the U.S. Attorney's Office for the Middle District of Florida. In 2020, he began working in private practice.

=== U.S. Attorney for the District of Southern Iowa ===
On March 31, 2025, Waterman was nominated by President Donald Trump to be the United States Attorney for the District of Southern Iowa. He was confirmed by the U.S. Senate on October 7, 2025, and sworn into office on October 15, 2025. President Joe Biden had previously nominated Waterman for the same post, but the U.S. Senate did not take action on his nomination prior to the end of Biden's presidency.

Legal offices
Preceded by Richard D. Westphal	United States Attorney for the District of Southern Iowa; 2025-	Succeeded by Incumbent
