= List of first women lawyers and judges in Iowa =

This is a list of Iowa's first women lawyers and judges. It includes the year the women were admitted to practice law (in parentheses). Also included are women who achieved other distinctions, such as becoming the first in their state to graduate from law school or become a political figure.

== Firsts in Iowa's history ==
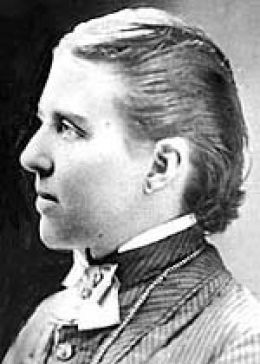
Arabella Mansfield: First female admitted to practice law in Iowa (1869)

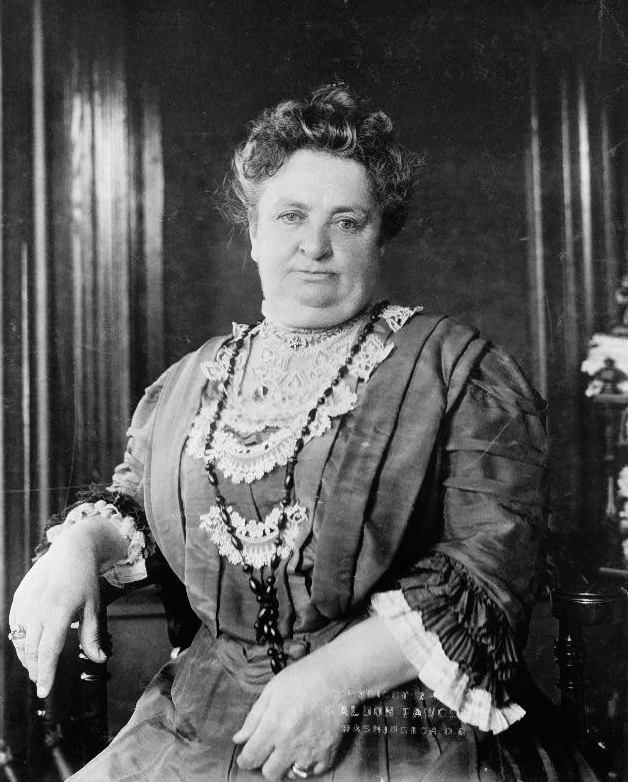
Judith Ellen Foster: First female to actually practice law in Iowa (1872)

=== Law degree ===
- First female law graduate: Mary Beth Hickey in 1873

=== Lawyers ===
- First female: Arabella Mansfield (1869)
- First female (actively practice): Judith Ellen Foster: (1872)
- First African American female: Gertrude Rush (1918)

=== State judges ===
- First female: Lynne Brady Neuhaus from 1973-2002
- First female (Iowa Court of Appeals): Janet Johnson from 1978-1983
- First female (Iowa Supreme Court): Linda K. Neuman from 1986-2003
- First female (Chief Justice; Iowa Supreme Court): Marsha K. Ternus in 2006
- First African American female: Romonda Belcher-Ford (1995) from 2010-2024
- First Latino American female: Kimberly Sue Ayotte in 2019

=== Federal judges ===
- First female (Seventh Judicial District): Margaret Briles from 1977-1992
- First female (serve on the bench of either of Iowa's federal district courts): Celeste F. Bremer (1977)
- First female (Fifth Judicial District): Linda R. Reade (1980) from 1993-2002
- First female (Chief Judge; Seventh Judicial District): Bobbi M. Alpers (1983) in 2006
- First female (U.S. District Court for the Southern District of Iowa and confirmed as an Article III judge): Stephanie Marie Rose (1996) beginning in 2012

=== Attorney General of Iowa ===
- First female: Bonnie Campbell (1985) from 1991-1995

=== Assistant Attorney General ===
- First female: Norma Kordick in 1954
- First African American female: Shirley Steele in 1977

=== Assistant United States Attorney ===
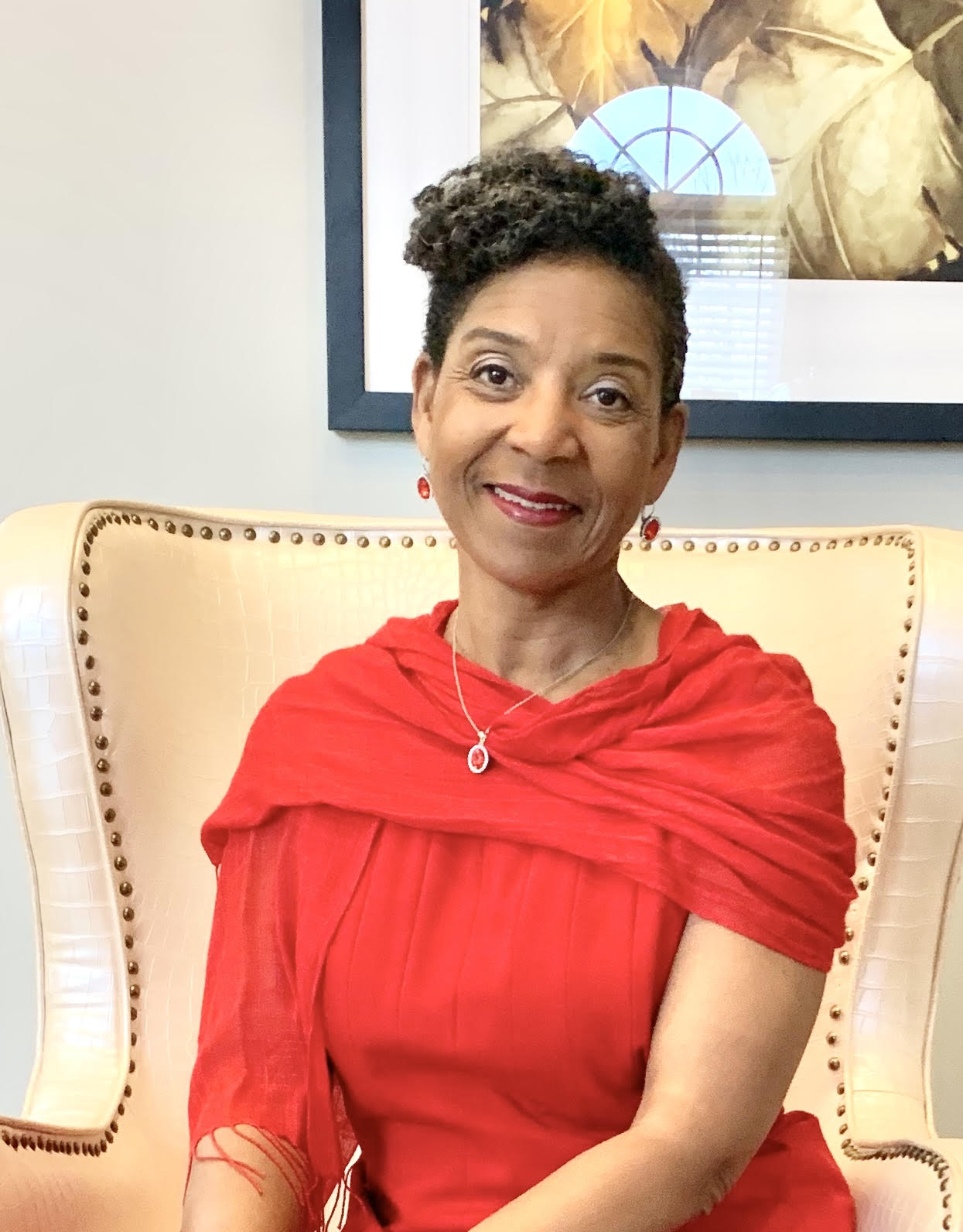
- Stephanie Wright, First Black Assistant District Attorney Northern District of Iowa (1994-2018)
  First African American (female) (Northern District of Iowa): Stephanie Wright

=== County Attorney ===
- First female: Emily L. Newbold in 1923

=== Iowa State Bar Association ===
- First female president: Carroll J. Reasoner

== Firsts in local history ==
- Nancy Whittenburg: First female appointed as a district county judge in District 3A of Iowa (2003)
- Mary Sokolovske: First female appointed as a district county judge in District 3B of Iowa (2000)
- Dusti Relph (2005): First female appointed as a Judge of Iowa District Court 5B (2014)
- Adria Kester: First female appointed as a Judge of Iowa District Court 2B (2017)
- Rosemary Shaw Sackett (1963): First female to practice law in Spencer, Iowa. She would later become a judge. [Clay County, Iowa]
- Margaret Kolarik (1925): First female lawyer in Clinton, Iowa [Clinton County, Iowa]
- Virginia Bedell: First female to serve as the County Attorney for Dickinson County, Iowa (1938)
- Mary B. Hickey Wilkinson: First female to graduate from the University of Iowa College of Law (1873) [Johnson County, Iowa]
- Anna Harvat Holbert (1899): First female lawyer in Iowa City, Iowa [Johnson County, Iowa]
- Ann Gales: First female district associate judge in Kossuth County, Iowa (2014)
- Imogen B. Emery (1933): First female lawyer in Cedar Rapids, Iowa [Linn County, Iowa]
- Willie Stevenson Glanton: First female (and African American female) to become an Assistant Polk County Attorney
- Mildred Vanacek: First female Justice of the Peace in Garner Township, Pottawattamie County, Iowa (1932)
- Linda K. Neuman: First female to serve as a part-time magistrate in Scott County, Iowa (c. 1980)
- Ruth Harkin: First female to serve as the County Attorney for Story County, Iowa
- Emily L. Newbold: First female to serve as a County Attorney in Van Buren County, Iowa (1923)
- Sherry Raduenz: First female lawyer in Decorah, Iowa [Winneshiek County, Iowa]

== See also ==
- List of first women lawyers and judges in the United States
- Timeline of women lawyers in the United States
- Women in law

== Other topics of interest ==
- List of first minority male lawyers and judges in the United States
- List of first minority male lawyers and judges in Iowa
