= Charles Dewey =

Charles Dewey may refer to:

- Charles Melville Dewey (1849–1937), American painter
- Charles Almon Dewey (1877–1958), judge of the U.S. District Court for the Southern District of Iowa
- Charles Augustus Dewey (1793–1866), Justice of the Massachusetts Supreme Judicial Court
- Charles S. Dewey (1880–1980), American politician from Illinois
- Charles Dewey (Indiana judge) (1784–1862), Justice of the Indiana Supreme Court
