= Ronald Earl Longstaff =

American judge (born 1941)

Senior Judge of the United States District Court for the Southern District of Iowa
- Incumbent
- Assumed office November 5, 2006

Chief Judge of the United States District Court for the Southern District of Iowa
- In office 2001–2006
- Preceded by: Charles R. Wolle
- Succeeded by: Robert W. Pratt

Judge of the United States District Court for the Southern District of Iowa
- In office November 5, 1991 – November 5, 2006
- Appointed by: George H. W. Bush
- Preceded by: Seat established by 104 Stat. 5089
- Succeeded by: John Alfred Jarvey

Magistrate Judge of the United States District Court for the Southern District of Iowa
- In office 1968–1991

Personal details
- Born: February 14, 1941 (age 85) Pittsburg, Kansas, U.S.
- Education: Pittsburg State University (BA); University of Iowa (JD)

Ronald Earl Longstaff (born February 14, 1941) is an inactive Senior United States district judge of the United States District Court for the Southern District of Iowa.

== Education and career ==
Longstaff was born in Pittsburg, Kansas. He received a Bachelor of Arts degree in accounting from Pittsburg State University in 1962 and a Juris Doctor, with honors, from the University of Iowa College of Law in 1965. In law school, he was a comments editor of the Iowa Law Review and published three pieces in the journal. Longstaff was a law clerk for Judge Roy L. Stephenson of the United States District Court for the Southern District of Iowa from 1965 to 1967, during which time he worked on Tinker v. Des Moines Independent Community School District. He was in private practice in Des Moines, Iowa from 1967 to 1968. Longstaff then served as the Clerk of Court for the Southern District of Iowa from 1968 to 1976, and also as the commissioner and then the first full-time United States magistrate judge for the district from 1968 to 1991.

=== Federal judicial service ===
On July 24, 1991, Longstaff was nominated by President George H. W. Bush to a new seat on the United States District Court for the Southern District of Iowa created by 104 Stat. 5089. He was confirmed by the United States Senate on October 31, 1991, and received his commission on November 5, 1991. He served as chief judge from 2001 to 2006, assuming senior status on November 5, 2006. Longstaff has thus far been the only judge on the Southern District of Iowa to preside over a multidistrict litigation, related to Teflon products. In September 2016, Longstaff ceased taking cases. His first law clerk, James E. Gritzner, also became a federal judge in the same district.

== Sources ==
Legal offices
Preceded by Seat established by 104 Stat. 5089	Judge of the United States District Court for the Southern District of Iowa; 1991–2006	Succeeded by John Alfred Jarvey
Preceded by Charles R. Wolle	Chief Judge of the United States District Court for the Southern District of Iowa; 2001–2006	Succeeded by Robert W. Pratt
