= Mason City High School =

Public secondary school in Mason City, Iowa, United States

Location
- 1700 4th Street Southeast; Mason City, Iowa 50401; United States; 43°08′56″N 93°10′01″W

Information
- Type: Public, coeducational
- Established: 1890
- School district: Mason City Community School District
- Superintendent: Pat Hamilton
- Principal: Dan Long
- Teaching staff: 53.88 (FTE)
- Grades: 9–12
- Enrollment: 967 (2023-2024)
- Student to teacher ratio: 17.95
- Campus size: 3 acres
- Colors: Red and black
- Fight song: Mason City Go!
- Athletics conference: Iowa Alliance Conference -
- Mascot: Riverhawk
- Rival: Fort Dodge, Iowa
- Yearbook: Masonian
- Website: masoncityschools.org

Mason City High School is a public high school in the Mason City Community School District. It is within the city of Mason City, Iowa, United States. It is located in Cerro Gordo County. The school colors are black and red. Until recently, the mascot was a Mohawk (Indian Tribe figure). The current mascot is the Riverhawk.

== History ==
Mason City High School was established in 1890. A new building was erected at 22 N. Georgia Avenue in 1917. The current high school building at 1700 4th Street SE was constructed in 1966 after the 1917 building became overcrowded due to the rapidly growing student population during the 1946-1964 "Baby Boom". Later, the 1917 building was renovated into a public services office building, and is called Mohawk Square. The building suffered a catastrophic roof failure after a heavy storm in May 2019, with the building then being declared unsafe and all the businesses and agencies located there having to be forced to find new quarters.

The current building shares its campus with John Adams Middle School (7-8 grade), which was built in the early 1960s as a junior high school.

== Demographics ==
The demographic breakdown of the 1008 students enrolled in 2013-2014 was:

- Male - 49.6%
- Female - 50.4%
- Native American/Alaskan - 0.4%
- Asian/Pacific islanders - 1.4%
- Black - 3.6%
- Hispanic - 7.8%
- White - 84.5%
- Multiracial - 2.3%

40.4% of the students were eligible for free or reduced lunch.

== Athletics ==
MCHS's programs include football, volleyball, cross country, football cheerleading, girls’ basketball, boys’ basketball, wrestling, dance team, basketball cheerleading, girls’ track, boys’ track, girls’ golf, boys’ golf, baseball, boys' tennis, girls' tennis, boys' swimming, girls' swimming, boys' hockey, girls' hockey, boys' soccer, girls' soccer, softball, and a recent addition of mountain biking. All of these compete as the Riverhawks. MCHS is a member of the Iowa Alliance Conference (IAC). The conference is made up of 11 teams. 10 of those schools were formerly in the CIML (Waterloo East, MVC). In early 2020, there was some talk of switching to the seven-member Northeast Iowa Conference, where Mason City would be far and away the largest school. Instead Mason City founded the IAC

=== State championships ===
- Cheerleading (6-time State Champions - 1996, 1997, 2005, 2018, 2020, 2021)
- Dance (17-time State Champions - 2003, 2004, 2006, 2007, 2008, 2009, 2010, 2011, 2012, 2014, 2015, 2016, 2017, 2018, 2019, 2020, 2021)
- Baseball (7-time State Champions - 1935, 1937, 1938, 1946, 1956, 1972 (Spring), 1972 (Summer))
- Boys' Basketball (5-time State Champions - 1935, 1940, 1943, 1996, 1997)
- Girls' Basketball (2016 State Champions)
- Boys' Cross Country (2-time State Champions - 1972, 1973)
- Football (1978 State Champions)
- Boys' Swimming (3-time State Champions - 1975, 1979, 1991)
- Girls' Swimming (3-time State Champions - 1988, 1989, 2009)
- Boys' Track and Field (3-time State Champions - 1918, 1929, 1930)
- Volleyball (1973 State Champions)
- Wrestling (3-time State Champions - 1922, 1949, 1950)

== Notable alumni ==
- Eddie Anderson, former NFL player and coach
- Tanna Frederick, actress
- Kate Stevens Harpel, teacher, school board member, physician
- Jeff Horner, college and professional basketball player
- Joe Lillard, former NFL player
- Stephen H. Locher, lawyer
- Dean Oliver, college and professional basketball player
- Tom Randall, former NFL player
- Dennis Remmert, former NFL player
- Chad Wicks, former WWE professional wrestler
- Robert Meredith Willson, playwright, composer, and flutist
- Leslie Winston, actress

== See also ==
- List of high schools in Iowa
