= Carroll O. Switzer =

American judge

Judge of the United States District Court for the Southern District of Iowa
- In office October 21, 1949 – August 9, 1950
- Appointed by: Harry S. Truman
- Preceded by: Charles Almon Dewey
- Succeeded by: William F. Riley

Personal details
- Born: Carroll O. Switzer; May 23, 1908 Pilot Mound, Iowa
- Died: May 30, 1960 (aged 52) Des Moines, Iowa
- Education: Drake University Law School (LL.B.)

Carroll O. Switzer (May 23, 1908 – May 30, 1960) was an American politician who was an unsuccessful candidate for Governor of Iowa who later served as a state court judge and briefly as a United States district judge of the United States District Court for the Southern District of Iowa.

== Education and career ==
Born in Pilot Mound, Iowa, Switzer received a Bachelor of Laws from Drake University Law School in 1931. Following graduate work at Northwestern University, he entered private practice in 1932 in Des Moines, Iowa. He was an assistant city solicitor for Des Moines from 1936 to 1938. While serving as Polk County Attorney from 1946 to 1948, he was the Democratic nominee for Governor of Iowa in 1948, losing in the general election to William S. Beardsley.

== Federal judicial service ==
In early 1949, President Harry S. Truman announced his plan to nominate Switzer to fill a seat on the United States District Court for the Southern District of Iowa vacated by Judge Charles Almon Dewey. Although supported by the state Democratic Party chair, Switzer was not among the two choices suggested to Truman by Iowa's only Democratic United States Senator, Guy Gillette, and was opposed by bar associations in the district's largest counties. Gillette, who considered Truman's nomination of Switzer a "personal affront," held up the nomination in the Senate until that body adjourned in 1949. On October 21, 1949, Switzer received a recess appointment from President Truman, and began to serve soon thereafter. Formally re-nominated on January 5, 1950, in the face of Gillette's continued opposition, Switzer was not confirmed by the Senate. When the Senate unanimously rejected Switzer's appointment on August 9, 1950, Switzer resigned that day, though he would have been eligible to continuing serving until the sine die adjournment of that session of Congress. Truman then nominated William F. Riley, one of the two candidates on Gillette's original list. Riley was easily confirmed by a lame-duck Democratic Senate, and sworn in as 1950 ended.

== State court service and death ==
In 1957, Iowa Governor Herschel Loveless appointed Switzer to the state district court bench in Des Moines. He was elected to that position the following year. While preparing to preside as chairman of the 1960 Democratic State Convention in Des Moines, Switzer was hospitalized for chest pains. While hospitalized, he had a fatal heart attack on May 30, 1960.

== Sources ==
Party political offices
| Preceded by Frank Miles | Democratic nominee for Governor of Iowa; 1948 | Succeeded by Lester S. Gillette |
Legal offices
| Preceded by Charles Almon Dewey | Judge of the United States District Court for the Southern District of Iowa; 1949–1950 | Succeeded by William F. Riley |
