= Rebecca Goodgame Ebinger =

American judge (born 1975)

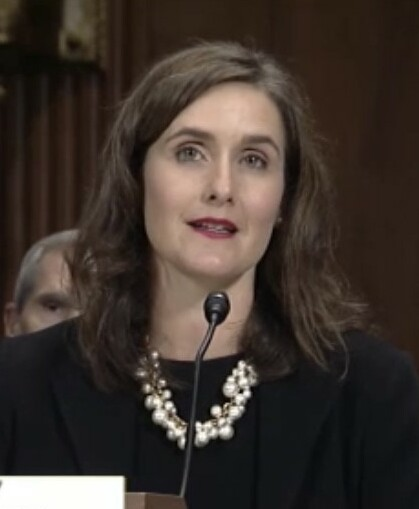
- Ebinger in 2015

Judge of the United States District Court for the Southern District of Iowa
- Incumbent
- Assumed office February 16, 2016
- Appointed by: Barack Obama
- Preceded by: James E. Gritzner

Personal details
- Born: Rebecca Leigh Goodgame Clearwater, Florida, U.S.
- Education: Georgetown University (BSFS); Yale University (JD)

Rebecca Leigh Goodgame Ebinger (née Goodgame; born 1975) is a United States district judge of the United States District Court for the Southern District of Iowa and former Iowa state judge.

== Early life and education ==
Ebinger received a Bachelor of Science in Foreign Service in 1997 from the Edmund A. Walsh School of Foreign Service at Georgetown University. Before law school, she worked at the Council on Foreign Relations and the Center for Strategic and International Studies. She began law school at William & Mary Law School, where she was first in her class, before transferring to Yale Law School, from which she graduated in 2004. At Yale, she won the Potter Stewart Prize for winning the Morris Tyler Moot Court. She also worked at the United States Attorney's Office for the District of Connecticut and for the Central Intelligence Agency's Office of General Counsel.

== Career ==
She began her legal career with the United States Attorney's Office for the Northern District of Iowa, serving as a special assistant United States attorney, from 2004 to 2006. From 2006 to 2008, she served as a law clerk to Judge Michael Joseph Melloy of the United States Court of Appeals for the Eighth Circuit. From 2009 to 2011, she served as an assistant United States attorney in the Criminal Division of the United States Attorney's Office for the Northern District of Iowa, primarily specializing in white-collar crime. When she worked in Cedar Rapids from 2004 to 2011, she coached the University of Iowa College of Law's moot court team. From 2011 to 2012, she was an assistant United States attorney in the Southern District of Iowa and worked in the appellate unit. From 2012 to 2016, she served as a state district judge in Iowa's Judicial Election District 5C after being appointed by Governor Terry Branstad.

=== Federal judicial service ===
On September 15, 2015, President Barack Obama nominated Ebinger to serve as a United States district judge of the United States District Court for the Southern District of Iowa, to the seat vacated by Judge James E. Gritzner, who assumed senior status on March 1, 2015. She received a hearing before the United States Senate Judiciary Committee on October 21, 2015. On November 5, 2015 her nomination was reported out of committee by voice vote. On February 8, 2016, she was confirmed by the Senate by a 83–0 vote. She received her commission on February 16, 2016.

Legal offices
Preceded by James E. Gritzner	Judge of the United States District Court for the Southern District of Iowa; 2016–present	Incumbent
