= United States District Court for the Southern District of Iowa =

United States federal district court in Iowa

Coordinates: 41°35′15.1″N 93°36′55.0″W

- (S.D. Iowa)
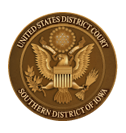

- The Northern (red) and Southern (blue) Districts of Iowa
- Location: United States Courthouse (Des Moines) More locations: United States Courthouse (Davenport); Council Bluffs; Keokuk; Creston; Ottumwa
- Appeals to: Eighth Circuit
- Established: July 20, 1882
- Judges: 3
- Chief Judge: Stephanie M. Rose

Officers of the court
- U.S. Attorney: David Waterman
- U.S. Marshal: Ted G. Kamatchus
- www.iasd.uscourts.gov

The United States District Court for the Southern District of Iowa (in case citations, S.D. Iowa) has jurisdiction over forty-seven of Iowa's ninety-nine counties. It is subject to the Eighth Circuit Court of Appeals (except for patent claims and claims against the U.S. government under the Tucker Act, which are appealed to the Federal Circuit).

The United States District Court for the District of Iowa, established on March 3, 1845, by 5 Stat. 789, was subdivided into the current Northern and Southern Districts on July 20, 1882, by 22 Stat. 172. Initially, one judge was assigned to each District.

By 1927, a backlog of unresolved cases dating back to 1920 had developed. In October 1927, Judge Martin Joseph Wade announced that he "was through" attempting to try cases requiring more than one day, but urged Congress to create a second judgeship for the Southern District of Iowa. On January 19, 1928, President Calvin Coolidge signed into law a bill that authorized a second judgeship for the District, with the proviso that when the existing judgeship (held by Judge Wade) becomes vacant, it shall not be filled unless authorized by Congress. When the original judgeship became vacant upon Wade's death in 1931, Congress did not act to reauthorize it, leaving the Southern District with a single judgeship. A second judgeship in the Southern District was not reauthorized by Congress until 1979, with the creation of the judgeship first held by Harold Duane Vietor.

In 1962, Congress created a new judgeship that would be shared by the Northern and Southern Districts of Iowa. The shared judgeship was replaced in 1990 when the shared judgeship (then held by Judge Donald E. O'Brien) was assigned entirely to the Northern District, and a third Southern District judgeship (first held by Judge Ronald Earl Longstaff) was authorized.

In 2012, Judge Stephanie M. Rose was the first woman appointed to the bench in the Southern District of Iowa.

It is headquartered at the United States Courthouse in Des Moines, with satellite facilities in Council Bluffs and at the United States Court House in Davenport. As of December 12, 2025, the United States attorney is David Waterman.

== Jurisdiction ==
Federal judicial districts and divisions in Iowa. Northern District of Iowa Western Division Central Division Eastern Division Cedar Rapids Division Southern District of Iowa Western Division Central Division Davenport Division

The Southern District of Iowa has three court divisions, each covering the following counties:

The Central Division, covering Adair, Adams, Appanoose, Boone, Clarke, Dallas, Davis, Decatur, Greene, Guthrie, Jasper, Jefferson, Keokuk, Lucas, Madison, Mahaska, Marion, Marshall, Monroe, Polk, Poweshiek, Ringgold, Story, Taylor, Union, Wapello, Warren and Wayne counties.

The Eastern Division, covering Clinton, Des Moines, Henry, Johnson, Lee, Louisa, Muscatine, Scott, Van Buren, and Washington counties.

The Western Division, covering Audubon, Cass, Fremont, Harrison, Mills, Montgomery, Page, Pottawattamie and Shelby counties.

== Current judges ==
As of January 28, 2026:

#	Title	Judge	Duty station	Born	Term of service			Appointed by
#	Title	Judge	Duty station	Born	Active	Chief	Senior	Appointed by
19	Chief Judge	Stephanie M. Rose	Des Moines	1972	2012–present	2022–present	—	Obama
20	District Judge	Rebecca Ebinger	Des Moines	1975	2016–present	—	—	Obama
21	District Judge	Stephen H. Locher	Des Moines	1978	2022–present	—	—	Biden
15	Senior Judge	Ronald Earl Longstaff	inactive	1941	1991–2006	2001–2006	2006–present	G.H.W. Bush
17	Senior Judge	James E. Gritzner	Des Moines	1947	2002–2015	2011–2015	2015–present	G.W. Bush

== Former judges ==
#	Judge	Born–died	Active service	Chief Judge	Senior status	Appointed by	Reason for termination
1	James M. Love	1820–1891	1882–1891 (Note: Reassigned from the District of Iowa)	—	—	Pierce/Operation of law	death
2	John Simson Woolson	1840–1899	1891–1899 (Note: Recess appointment; formally nominated on December 10, 1891, confirmed by the United States Senate on January 11, 1892, and received commission the same day)	—	—	B. Harrison	death
3	Smith McPherson	1848–1915	1900–1915	—	—	McKinley	death
4	Martin Joseph Wade	1861–1931	1915–1931	—	—	Wilson	death
5	Charles Almon Dewey	1877–1958	1928–1949	—	1949–1958	Coolidge	death
6	Carroll O. Switzer	1908–1960	1949–1950 (Note: Recess appointment; the Senate later rejected the appointment.)	—	—	Truman	not confirmed
7	William F. Riley	1884–1956	1950–1956	—	—	Truman	death
8	Edwin Richley Hicklin	1895–1963	1957–1960	—	1960–1963	Eisenhower	death
9	Roy Laverne Stephenson	1917–1982	1960–1971	1961–1971	—	Eisenhower	elevation
10	William Cook Hanson	1909–1995	1962–1977 (Note: Jointly appointed to the Northern and Southern Districts of Iowa.)	1971–1977	1977–1995	Kennedy	death
11	William Corwin Stuart	1920–2010	1971–1986	1977–1985	1986–2010	Nixon	death
12	Donald E. O'Brien	1923–2015	1978–1990	—	—	Carter	reassignment
13	Harold Duane Vietor	1931–2016	1979–1996	1985–1992	1996–2016	Carter	death
14	Charles R. Wolle	1935–2022	1987–2001	1992–2001	2001–2022	Reagan	death
16	Robert W. Pratt	1947–2026	1997–2012	2006–2011	2012–2026	Clinton	death
18	John Alfred Jarvey	1956–present	2007–2022	2015–2022	—	G.W. Bush	retirement

== Chief judges ==
Chief judges have administrative responsibilities with respect to their district court. Unlike the Supreme Court, where one justice is specifically nominated to be chief, the office of chief judge rotates among the district court judges. To be chief, a judge must have been in active service on the court for at least one year, be under the age of 65, and have not previously served as chief judge.

A vacancy is filled by the judge highest in seniority among the group of qualified judges. The chief judge serves for a term of seven years, or until age 70, whichever occurs first. The age restrictions are waived if no members of the court would otherwise be qualified for the position.

When the office was created in 1948, the chief judge was the longest-serving judge who had not elected to retire, on what has since 1958 been known as senior status, or declined to serve as chief judge. After August 6, 1959, judges could not become or remain chief after turning 70 years old. The current rules have been in operation since October 1, 1982.

== Succession of seats ==
Seat 1
Seat reassigned from the District of Iowa on July 20, 1882 by 22 Stat. 172
Love	1882–1891
Woolson	1892–1899
McPherson	1900–1915
Wade	1915–1931
Seat abolished on April 16, 1931 (temporary judgeship expired)

Seat 2
Seat established on January 19, 1928 by 45 Stat. 52 (temporary)
Seat became permanent upon the abolition of Seat 1 on April 16, 1931
Dewey	1928–1949
Switzer	1949–1950
Riley	1950–1956
Hicklin	1957–1960
Stephenson	1960–1971
Stuart	1971–1986
Wolle	1987–2001
Gritzner	2002–2015
Ebinger	2016–present

Seat 3
Seat established on May 19, 1961 by 75 Stat. 80 (concurrent with Northern District)
Hanson	1962–1977
O'Brien	1978–1990
Seat reassigned solely to Northern District on December 1, 1990 by 104 Stat. 5089

Seat 4
Seat established on October 20, 1978 by 92 Stat. 1629
Vietor	1979–1996
Pratt	1997–2012
Rose	2012–present

Seat 5
Seat established on December 1, 1990 by 104 Stat. 5089
Longstaff	1991–2006
Jarvey	2007–2022
Locher	2022–present

== U.S. Attorneys ==
- John S. Runnels 1882-85
- Daniel O. Finch 1885-89
- Lewis Miles 1889-93
- Charles D. Fullen 1893-1902
- Claude R. Porter 1914-18
- Edwin G. Moon 1918-22
- Ralph Pringle 1922-24
- Edwin G. Moon 1924
- Ross R. Mowry 1924-32
- Robert W. Colflesh 1932-34
- Edwin G. Moon 1934-39
- Cloid I. Level 1939
- John K. Valentine 1939-40
- Hugh B. McCoy 1940
- Maurice F. Donegan 1940-49
- William R. Hart 1949-53
- Roy L. Stephenson 1953-60
- Roy W. Meadows 1960-61
- Donald A. Wine 1961-65
- Philip T. Riley 1965
- Donald M. Statton 1965-67
- Jerry E. Williams 1967
- James P. Rielly 1967-69
- Allen L. Donielson 1969-76
- George H. Perry 1976-77
- Paul A. Zoss, Jr. 1977
- James R. Rosenbaum 1977
- Roxanne Barton Conlin 1977-81
- Kermit B. Anderson 1981
- Richard C. Turner 1981-86
- Christopher D. Hagen 1986-90
- Gene W. Shepard 1990-93
- Don Carlos Nickerson 1993-2001
- Inga Bumbary-Langston 2001
- Steven M. Colloton 2001-2003
- Stephen Patrick O'Meara 2003-2004
- Matthew Whitaker 2004-2009
- Nicholas A. Klinefeldt 2009-2015
- Kevin E. VanderSchel 2015-2017
- Marc Krickbaum 2017-2021
- Richard D. Westphal 2021-2025
- David Waterman 2025-

== See also ==
- Courts of Iowa
- List of current United States district judges
- List of United States federal courthouses in Iowa
