= Staunton Law School =

Law school in Staunton, Virginia (1831–1849)

Staunton Law School was a law school operated in Staunton, Virginia, from 1831 to 1839, and from 1839 to 1849.

An 1831 report of the intended opening of the school stated:

New Law School in Virginia. Briscoe G. Baldwin intends opening a Law School in the town of Staunton, Virginia, to be continued permanently, if adequate encouragement should be received. The mode of instruction will be a course of lectures and study, and frequent examinations. In order to devote the greater part of his time to the proposed school, he will, from its commencement, confine his practice to the Court of Appeals at Lewisburg, and the Federal and Circuit Superior Courts in Staunton. The first session will begin on the first of October, and continue until the first of July next following, without intermission, except during the terms of the Federal and Circuit Superior Courts. The tuition fees, per session, will be seventy-five dollars.

The law school was established at a time when a number of new law schools were experimenting with new methods in teaching students, and was able to engage in the same experimentation. Baldwin, who disliked the tendency of lawyers taking on apprentices for their labor, but failing to teach them the law, "announced that he would experiment with a new teaching method" by dividing the law school into Junior and Senior classes, with the Junior class being assigned elementary readings in the law, and the senior class receiving lectures. The law school was described as "a large and successful law school, attended by students from many States", with Baldwin's lectures "covering the whole body of common and statute law and equity".

In 1839, Baldwin's school closed due to "pressures of business and age" affecting Baldwin, and Judge Lucas P. Thompson quickly established a new school referred to by the same name. Thompson doubted the value of lectures, and preferred to assign the students reading, and then quiz them on their knowledge of the assigned materials. The school then operated until its closure in 1849 due to competition pressures.

Notable alumni of the school include United States District Judge John James Dyer and Arkansas Supreme Court Justice Christopher C. Scott.

== See also ==
- List of defunct law schools in the United States
