= Edwin Richley Hicklin =

American judge (1895–1963)

Senior Judge of the United States District Court for the Southern District of Iowa
- In office January 27, 1960 – September 19, 1963

Judge of the United States District Court for the Southern District of Iowa
- In office August 16, 1957 – January 27, 1960
- Appointed by: Dwight D. Eisenhower
- Preceded by: William F. Riley
- Succeeded by: Roy Laverne Stephenson

Personal details
- Born: Edwin Richley Hicklin; March 1, 1895 Wapello, Iowa
- Died: September 19, 1963 (aged 68)
- Education: Drake University (A.B.); University of Iowa College of Law (LL.B.)

Edwin Richley Hicklin (Note: Some sources give his middle name as Reichley.) (March 1, 1895 – September 19, 1963) was a United States district judge of the United States District Court for the Southern District of Iowa.

== Education and career ==
Born in Wapello, Iowa, Hicklin graduated from high school in 1911 at 16 years old. He received an Artium Baccalaureus degree from Drake University in 1915 and a Bachelor of Laws from the University of Iowa College of Law in 1917. He was in private practice in southeastern Iowa from 1918 to 1957. He was county attorney of Louisa County, Iowa from 1920 to 1924. He was a member of the Iowa Senate from 1930 to 1934, and an unsuccessful Republican candidate for the United States House of Representatives from Iowa's 1st congressional district in 1934, losing to New Deal Democrat Edward C. Eicher. He served in the United States Army during World War I and World War II eras. He initially joined Company E, Second Infantry and was at Camp Dodge. He became a sergeant and was discharged in January 1919. During the World War II era, he was a lieutenant colonel in the International Division of the Army Service Forces.

== Federal judicial service ==
Hicklin was nominated by President Dwight D. Eisenhower on July 16, 1957, to a seat on the United States District Court for the Southern District of Iowa vacated by Judge William F. Riley. He was confirmed by the United States Senate on August 15, 1957, and received his commission the next day. He assumed senior status due to a certified disability on January 27, 1960. His service terminated on September 19, 1963, due to his death.

== Sources ==
- Agency, Iowa Legislative Services. "State Senator". www.legis.iowa.gov.

Legal offices
Preceded by William F. Riley	Judge of the United States District Court for the Southern District of Iowa; 1957–1960	Succeeded by Roy Laverne Stephenson
