= James E. Gritzner =

American judge (born 1947)

Senior Judge of the United States District Court for the Southern District of Iowa
- Incumbent
- Assumed office March 1, 2015

Chief Judge of the United States District Court for the Southern District of Iowa
- In office 2011–2015
- Preceded by: Robert W. Pratt
- Succeeded by: John Alfred Jarvey

Judge of the United States District Court for the Southern District of Iowa
- In office February 19, 2002 – March 1, 2015
- Appointed by: George W. Bush
- Preceded by: Charles R. Wolle
- Succeeded by: Rebecca Goodgame Ebinger

Personal details
- Born: James Edward Gritzner; November 19, 1947 (age 78) Charles City, Iowa, U.S.
- Education: Dakota Wesleyan University (BA); University of Northern Iowa (MA); Drake University (JD)

James Edward Gritzner (born November 19, 1947) is a senior United States district judge of the United States District Court for the Southern District of Iowa.

== Education and career ==
Gritzner was born on November 19, 1947, in Charles City, Iowa. He received a Bachelor of Arts degree in speech from Dakota Wesleyan University in 1969, and a Master of Arts degree in verbal behavior from the University of Northern Iowa in 1974. He initially planned to be a professional choral director and competed in debate. From 1967 to 1976, Gritzner worked as a radio and television reporter in South Dakota and Iowa. He received a Juris Doctor from Drake University Law School in 1979. During Gritzner's third year of law school, he worked as a full-time law clerk to then-United States Magistrate Judge Ronald Longstaff of the United States District Court for the Southern District of Iowa.

From 1979 to 1981, Gritzner was an associate of the Waterloo, law firm Mosier, Thomas, Beatty, Dutton, Braun, and Staack. The firm is now known as Dutton, Daniels, Hines, Kalkhoff, Cook & Swanson. From 1981 to 1982, he worked at Humphrey, Haas and Gritzner, a new law firm in Des Moines, before leaving after a dispute about the propriety of attorney advertising under ethical rules. Gritzner then joined Nyemaster Goode in Des Moines, where he made partner in 1986. Gritzner litigated at Nyemaster until his appointment to the bench. One of Gritzner's specialties was litigation over catastrophic fires and explosions, in which he maintained a nationwide practice. He published an article on Iowa's tort law and comparative negligence in the Drake Law Review. Gritzner was also particularly noted for his expertise in legal ethics issues and was the primary prosecutor for the Committee on Professional Ethics and Conduct of the Iowa State Bar Association and the Client Security and Attorney Disciplinary Commission of the Iowa Supreme Court. Robert D. Ray appointed Gritzner to the Iowa Board of Parole from 1980 to 1982. Gritzner was regularly involved in Chuck Grassley's Senate campaigns from 1986 until he became a judge, including chairing Grassley's campaign committees throughout the 1990s.

== District court service ==
Gritzner was nominated as a United States District Judge of the United States District Court for the Southern District of Iowa by President George W. Bush on September 4, 2001, to a seat vacated when Charles R. Wolle took senior status. He was confirmed by the United States Senate on February 14, 2002, and received his commission on February 19, 2002. He served as chief judge from 2011 to 2015. He assumed senior status on March 1, 2015. In addition to his trial court service, Gritzner regularly sits by designation on the federal courts of appeals.

Legal offices
Preceded by Charles R. Wolle	Judge of the United States District Court for the Southern District of Iowa; 2002–2015	Succeeded by Rebecca Goodgame Ebinger
Preceded by Robert W. Pratt	Chief Judge of the United States District Court for the Southern District of Iowa; 2011–2015	Succeeded by John Alfred Jarvey
