= Christopher C. Scott =

American judge (1807–1859)

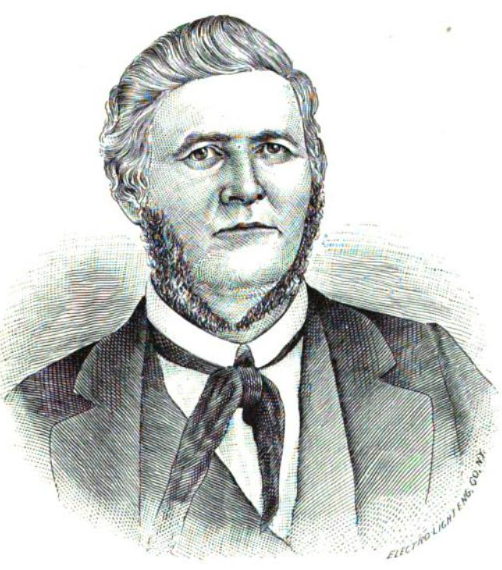
Scott

Christopher Columbus Scott (April 22, 1807 – January 19, 1859) was a justice of the Arkansas Supreme Court from 1848 to 1859.

Born at Scottsburg, Virginia, Scott was orphaned at the age of eleven and was raised by a brother. In 1827, at the age of 20, Scott graduated from Washington College (now Washington and Lee University) with highest honors, and at the head of his class. He moved to Gainesville, Alabama, in 1828, to study law, but abandoned it for mercantile pursuits. Proving unsuccessful in this venture, he returned to Virginia, and attended Staunton Law School.

Scott then returned to Gainesville, where he "soon became an active practitioner". He later moved to Camden, Arkansas, and in 1846 he was elected judge of the Arkansas Eighth Judicial Circuit, encompassing that city. He remained in that position until 1848, when Governor Thomas Stevenson Drew appointed Scott as an associate justice of the state supreme court, to a seat vacated by the resignation of Williamson Simpson Oldham. Scott then won reelection to the court for a term of eight years in November 1850, and was reelected again in 1858. His opinions were noted for being lengthy, a "natural result of his fluency in writing". While traveling from Camden to Little Rock in January, 1859, he contracted pneumonia and died at the Anthony House, a famous old hotel in Little Rock.

Political offices
Preceded by Williamson Simpson Oldham	Justice of the Arkansas Supreme Court; 1848–1859	Succeeded by Henry Massey Rector
