= United States Courthouse (Davenport) =

- United States Post Office and Court House
- U.S. National Register of Historic Places
- U.S. Historic district – Contributing property
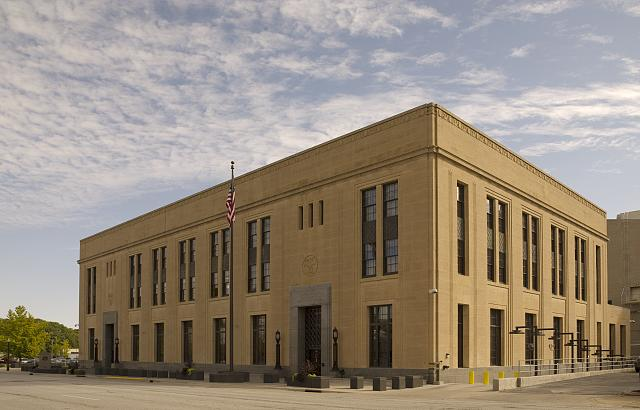
- U.S. Courthouse, October, 2008

- Location within Iowa Location within the United States
- Location: 131 E. 4th St. Davenport, Iowa
- Coordinates: 41°31′24″N 90°34′24″W
- Area: less than one acre
- Built: 1933
- Architect: Seth J. Temple
- Architectural style: Moderne; Art Deco
- Part of: Davenport Downtown Commercial Historic District (ID100005546)
- NRHP reference No.: 05000192
- Added to NRHP: March 25, 2005

The United States Courthouse, also known as the Federal Building, is a historic building located in Davenport, Iowa, United States. It has historically housed a post office, courthouse, and other offices of the United States government. The building now serves only as a federal courthouse, housing operations of the eastern division of the United States District Court for the Southern District of Iowa. In 2018, the operations of the Rock Island division of the United States District Court for the Central District of Illinois were also moved there.

== Building history ==
=== Predecessor building ===
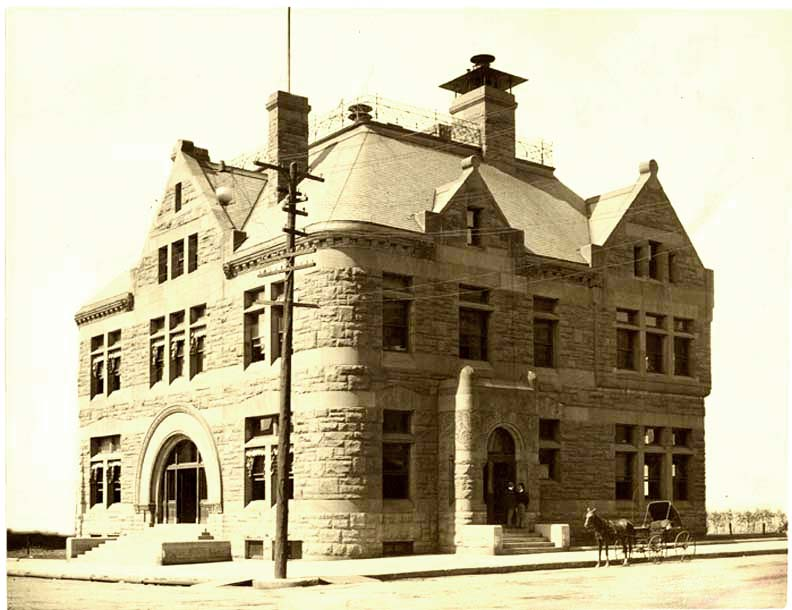
The U.S. Post Office which previously sat at the location of the current building.

Part of the site occupied by the courthouse was previously the site of an 1891 post office, completed in 1896 under the supervision of architect Willoughby J. Edbrooke. The 1891 building also became home to an office of the United States District Court for the Southern District of Iowa in 1904. A wing added in 1909 did little to alleviate the crowding in the building. The city experienced an economic boom during the 1920s that lasted into the early 1930s. The construction of high-rise buildings downtown, including hotels and department stores, spurred the need for a new building to house the post office and federal courts. By 1932, the Great Depression had put many people out of work. Federal projects, including construction of a lock and dam, improvements to the seawall, and road construction provided employment for Davenport residents.

In 1930, Congress appropriated $655,000 for the construction of a new federal building on the site of the 1891 building, plus the purchase of two adjacent parcels. Demolition of the early post office and courthouse took place in April 1932.

=== Construction ===
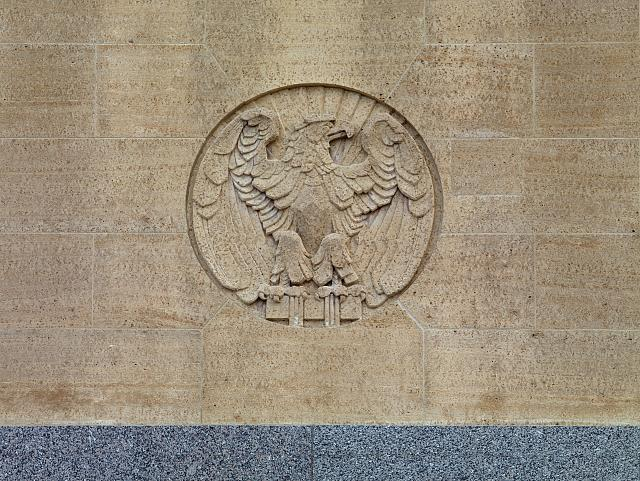
Exterior detail

Construction of the new building took just over 500 days.

Local architect Seth J. Temple designed the building, which was commissioned by the Office of the Supervising Architect of the Treasury. Temple studied at the American Academy in Rome and the École des Beaux-Arts in Paris, and taught at the University of Illinois School of Architecture in Urbana. Other Davenport buildings that Temple designed include Davenport Hall, the Union Bank and Office building, and the Blackhawk and Burlington hotels.

The building was completed for approximately $500,000, which was significantly less than the original appropriation, and city residents and officials gathered for a dedication ceremony on October 15, 1933. Constructed as a post office and courthouse, the building retained both of those functions until about 1965. The post office moved out of the building at that time and the U.S. General Services Administration (GSA) acquired the building. The building was individually listed on the National Register of Historic Places in 2005. In 2020 it was included as a contributing property in the Davenport Downtown Commercial Historic District.

== Architecture ==
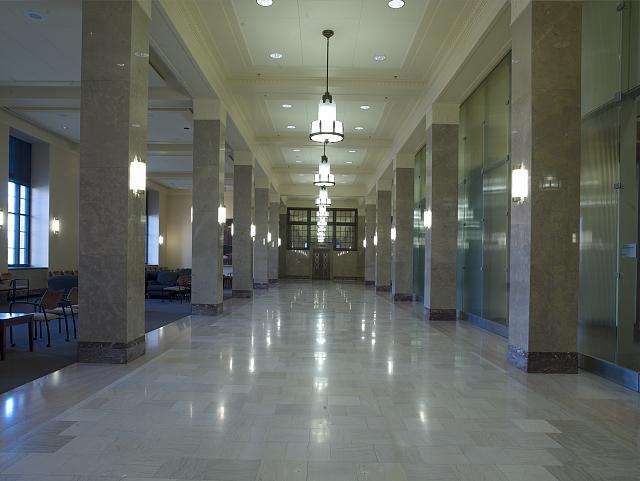
First-floor lobby

The U.S. Courthouse is a skillfully executed example of Depression-era architecture that invokes the Art Deco style. The three-story building is essentially rectangular, though a portion of the building near the rear has only one story. The building has a steel frame and integral concrete beam floors, with cladding that includes a coursed granite base and Minnesota Kasota travertine limestone on the north, east, and west elevations. The cladding of the south elevation is buff-colored brick laid in a Flemish bond pattern. The building has a flat composite roof with a parapet.

The main entry is in the north elevation, which is the most elaborate. The entablature above the third story windows projects slightly from the vertical surface of the building, set off by a limestone stringcourse. A decorative parapet at the top of the building features a carved limestone frieze with a stylized Ionic order capital and shield design. The elevation is nine bays wide. The second and eighth bays feature ground floor entrance doors, each with dark gray granite surrounds. Immediately above the doors are circular limestone panels featuring stylized carved eagles. Pairs of bronze light stanchions with granite bases flank each door, each with an embossed chevron and geometric designs. The door surrounds feature stylized carvings that imitate Beaux-Arts style classical pilasters. Embossed bronze spandrels separate the second and third story windows.

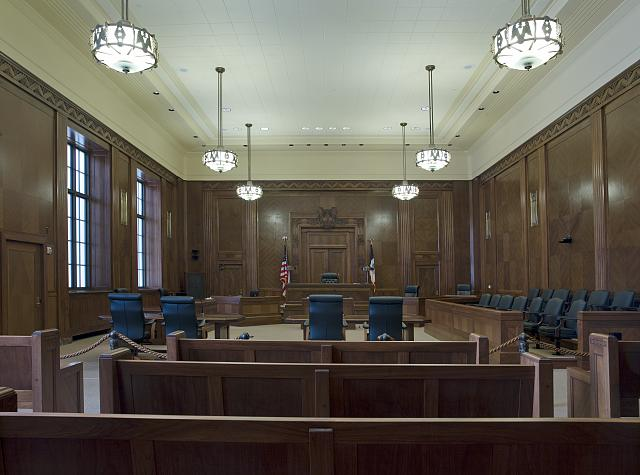
Second-floor courtroom

The most significant interior space is the two-story courtroom that occupies the central portion of the second floor, and its adjacent judges' chambers, library, and restroom. Flat geometric patterns and chevron designs reflect the architectural details of the building's exterior, as do the fluted classical pilasters. The interior of the east doors, which provide the main entry to the courtroom, are covered with leather and trimmed with metal studs. A base of rouge marble rings the room. The laurel paneling is laid in a herringbone pattern. The wood grain of the wainscoting is vertically oriented. The cornice frieze, carved to depict chevrons and stylized leaves, is black walnut. Black walnut insets depicting leaves and berries are located above the doors on the west side of the room. Some of the furnishings are original. Additional original interior details that remain include the flooring, some of which are terrazzo floors and others are marble. The wainscoting, cladding in bathrooms and vestibules, door surrounds in the vestibules and the first floor elevator lobby, stairway treads, and hallway baseboards are original marble. Some lighting fixtures in the stairwells and hallways are also original.

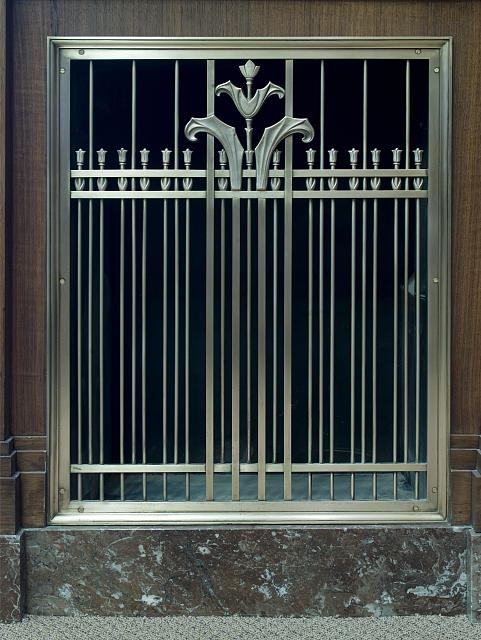
Metal grill in the second-floor courtroom

After the first renovation in the 1960s, which converted the former postal facilities into offices, there were additional renovations during the 1970s and 1990s. Between 2003 and 2005, the building was renovated under GSA's Design Excellence program, which provides design assistance to high-quality public buildings by stressing creativity and providing design feedback from peers. The project, which converted the building to a dedicated courthouse facility, included the construction of two new courtrooms, restoration of the historic courtroom, and renovation of the first-floor lobby.

In 2006, The Spirit of Law and Iowa Reports, paintings created by artist Xiaoze Xie under the auspices of GSA's Art in Architecture program, were installed in the Davenport Courthouse. The artist hoped that the paintings, installed in the jury assembly room, would "prompt visitors to consider the connections between history and the present and between ideas and realities."

== History ==
- 1891: Construction of original post office at this location
- 1932-1933: Construction of current building on site
- 1965: GSA acquires building after Post Office vacates building; first floor renovated
- 1972, 1977, 1997: Additional alterations to building
- 2005: Listed in National Register of Historic Places
- 2005: Completion of building modernization under GSA's Design Excellence program
- 2006: The Spirit of Law and Iowa Reports installed in jury assembly room

== Building facts ==
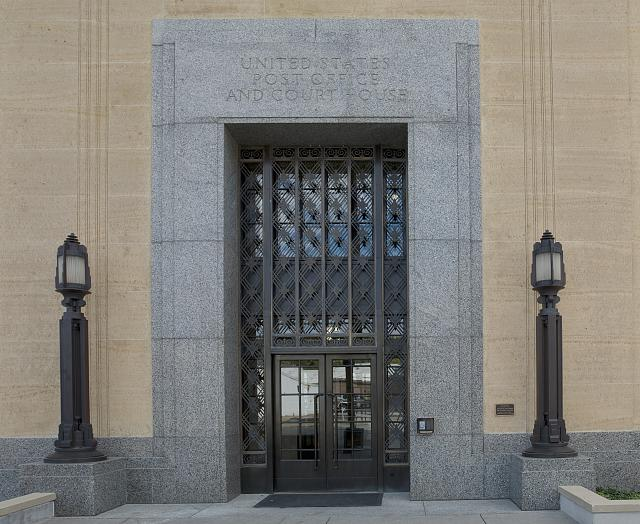
Main entrance

- Location: 131 East Fourth Street
- Architect: Seth J. Temple
- Construction Dates: 1932-1933
- Architectural Style: Art Deco
- Landmark Status: Listed in the National Register of Historic Places
- Primary Materials: Steel, concrete, limestone, and granite
- Prominent Features: Limestone and granite cladding; Wood-paneled courtroom; Stylized motifs carved on building facade

== See also ==
- List of United States federal courthouses in Iowa
- List of United States post offices
