= Tom Randall (American football) =

American football player (born 1956)

No. 60, 68
- Position: Offensive guard

Personal information
- Born: August 3, 1956 (age 70); Mason City, Iowa, U.S.
- Listed height: 6 ft 5 in (1.96 m)
- Listed weight: 245 lb (111 kg)

Career information
- High school: Mason City
- College: Iowa State
- NFL draft: 1978: 7th round, 194th overall pick

Career history
- Dallas Cowboys (1978); Houston Oilers (1979); Minnesota Vikings (1980)*
- * Offseason or practice squad member only

Awards and highlights
- First-team All-Big Eight (1977)

Career NFL statistics
- Games played: 24
- Stats at Pro Football Reference

Thomas Gene Randall (born August 3, 1956) is an American former professional football player who was an offensive lineman in the National Football League (NFL) for the Dallas Cowboys and Houston Oilers. He played college football for the Iowa State Cyclones.

== Early life ==
Randall attended Mason City High School, where he initially focused on playing basketball and set a school record with 21 rebounds in a game. That changed as a senior, when he became a starter and a two-way player, receiving all-state honors at offensive tackle.

He accepted a scholarship from Iowa State University, where he was coached by Earle Bruce. He became a starter at defensive tackle as a sophomore.

As a senior, he led all defensive lineman in tackles in the Big Eight Conference. He posted 50 solo tackles, 78 assisted tackles, 11 sacks, 4 batted down passes and one recovered fumble.

In 2011, he was inducted into the Cyclone Hall of Fame. In 1986, he was inducted into the Iowa High School Football Hall of Fame.

== Professional career ==
=== Dallas Cowboys ===
Randall was selected by the Dallas Cowboys in the seventh round (194th overall) of the 1978 NFL draft with the intention of converting him into an offensive lineman. As a rookie, he was a backup left guard and played on special teams, although he was affected with tonsillitis early in training camp. He played in Super Bowl XIII. In his second year he was considered one of the strongest players on the team, but was waived on August 27, 1979.

=== Houston Oilers ===
On August 28, 1979, the Houston Oilers claimed him off waivers and appeared in 13 games as a backup. On August 4, 1980, he walked out of training camp unhappy at being moved from guard to offensive tackle. He was released on August 13.

=== Minnesota Vikings ===
On August 15, 1980, he was claimed off waivers by the Minnesota Vikings. He was cut before the start of the season.

== Personal life ==
He owns a real estate company.
