= John Simson Woolson =

American judge

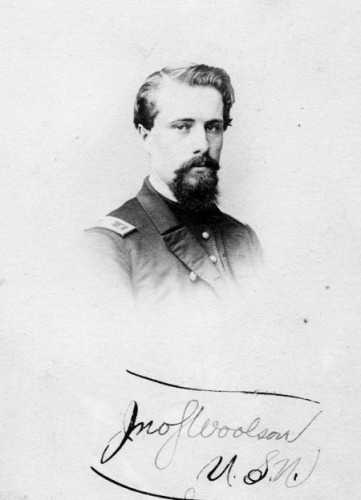
- John Simson Woolson

Judge of the United States District Court for the Southern District of Iowa
- In office August 14, 1891 – December 4, 1899
- Appointed by: Benjamin Harrison
- Preceded by: James M. Love
- Succeeded by: Smith McPherson

Member of the Iowa Senate from the 10th district
- In office January 11, 1886 – January 10, 1892
- In office January 14, 1878 – January 8, 1882

Member of the Iowa Senate from the 11th district
- In office January 10, 1876 – January 13, 1878

Personal details
- Born: John Simson Woolson; December 6, 1840 Tonawanda, New York, U.S.
- Died: December 4, 1899 (aged 58) Des Moines, Iowa, U.S.
- Resting place: Forest Home Cemetery, Mt Pleasant, Henry, Iowa, USA
- Citizenship: American
- Party: Republican
- Spouse: Mira Thornton Bird
- Children: Paul, Ralph, Miriam, Grace, Ruth
- Parents: Theron Webb Woolson (father); Clarissa M. Simson (mother)
- Education: Wesleyan University (A.B., A.M.) read law
- Occupation: Law

John Simson Woolson (December 6, 1840 – December 4, 1899) was a United States district judge of the United States District Court for the Southern District of Iowa.

== Education and career ==
Born in Tonawanda, New York, Woolson received an Artium Baccalaureus degree in 1860 and an Artium Magister degree in 1863 from Wesleyan University. Interrupting his legal education to serve in the American Civil War, he was an assistant paymaster in the United States Navy from 1862 to 1865 aboard the USS Housatonic (sunk by the submarine torpedo, H.L. Hunley) and the USS Monadnock. Following the war, he relocated to Iowa, where he read law to enter the bar in 1866. He was in private practice in Mt. Pleasant, Iowa from 1866 to 1891. While in practice, he served as a member of the Iowa Senate from 1876 to 1881, and from 1885 to 1891.

== Federal judicial service ==
Woolson received a recess appointment from President Benjamin Harrison on August 14, 1891, to a seat on the United States District Court for the Southern District of Iowa vacated by Judge James M. Love. He was nominated to the same position by President Harrison on December 10, 1891. He was confirmed by the United States Senate on January 11, 1892, and received his commission the same day. His service terminated on December 4, 1899, due to his death in Des Moines, Iowa.

== Sources ==
Legal offices
Preceded by James M. Love	Judge of the United States District Court for the Southern District of Iowa; 1891–1899	Succeeded by Smith McPherson
