= John James Dyer =

American judge

Judge of the United States District Court for the District of Iowa
- In office March 3, 1847 – September 14, 1855
- Appointed by: James K. Polk
- Preceded by: Seat established by 5 Stat. 789
- Succeeded by: James M. Love

Personal details
- Born: John James Dyer; July 26, 1809 Franklin, Virginia
- Died: September 14, 1855 (aged 46) Woodstock, Virginia
- Education: Staunton Law School

John James Dyer (July 26, 1809 – September 14, 1855) was a United States district judge of the United States District Court for the District of Iowa.

== Education and career ==
Born on July 26, 1809, in Franklin, Virginia (now West Virginia), Dyer graduated from Staunton Law School in Virginia in 1833. He entered private practice in Pendleton County, Virginia (now West Virginia) from 1833 to 1845. He was a commonwealth attorney for Pendleton County until 1845. He resumed private practice in Dubuque, Iowa Territory (State of Iowa from December 28, 1846) from 1845 to 1847.

== Federal judicial service ==
Dyer was nominated by President James K. Polk on February 8, 1847, to the United States District Court for the District of Iowa, to a new seat authorized by 5 Stat. 789. He was confirmed by the United States Senate on March 3, 1847, and received his commission the same day. His service terminated on September 14, 1855, due to his death in Woodstock, Virginia.

== Sources ==
Legal offices
Preceded by Seat established by 5 Stat. 789	Judge of the United States District Court for the District of Iowa; 1847–1855	Succeeded by James M. Love
