= 1948 Iowa gubernatorial election =

- November 2, 1948
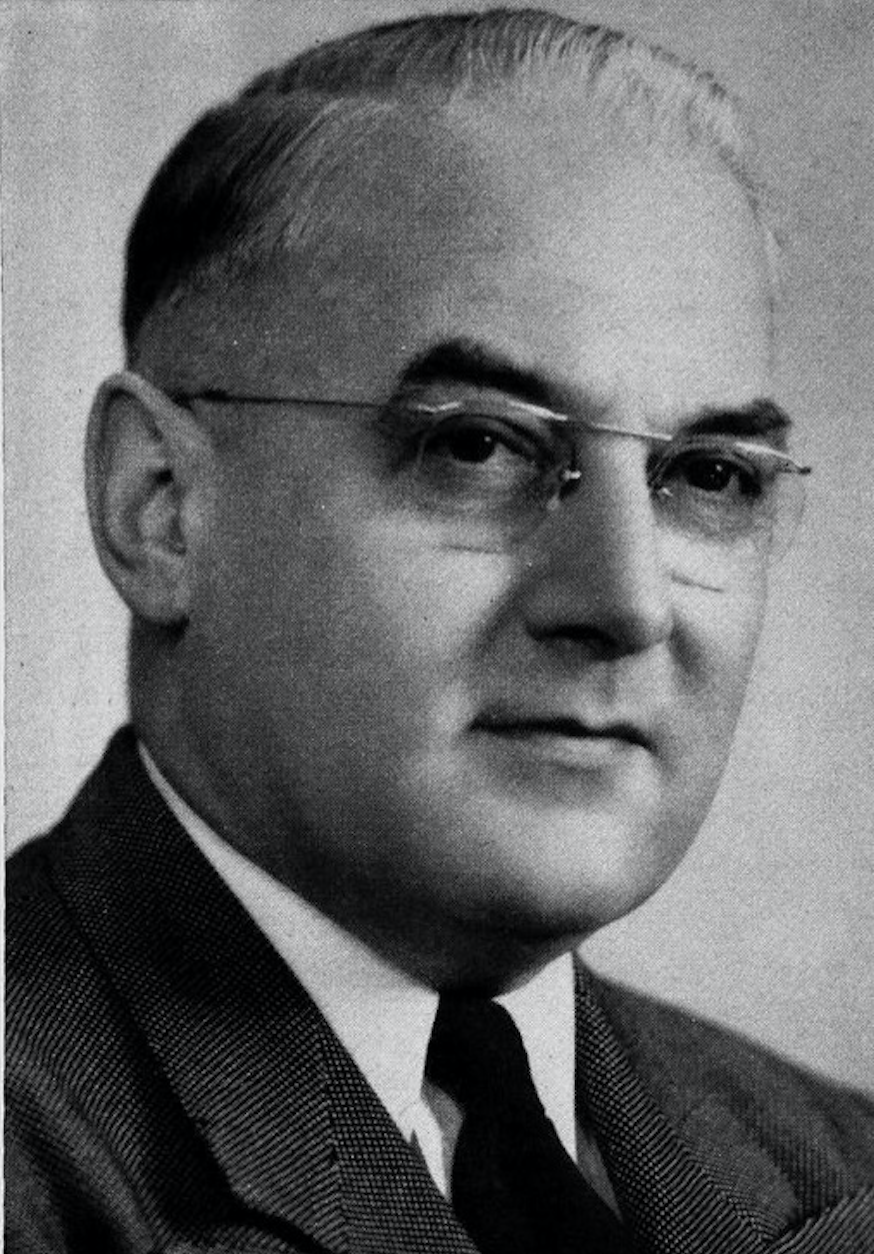

Nominee	William S. Beardsley	Carroll O. Switzer
Party	Republican	Democratic
Popular vote	553,900	434,432
Percentage	55.68%	43.67%
- County results Beardsley: 40–50% 50–60% 60–70% 70–80% Switzer: 50–60%
Governor before election
Robert D. Blue
Republican
Elected Governor
William S. Beardsley
Republican

The 1948 Iowa gubernatorial election was held on November 2, 1948. Republican nominee William S. Beardsley defeated Democratic nominee Carroll O. Switzer with 55.68% of the vote.

== Primary elections ==
Primary elections were held on June 7, 1948.

=== Democratic primary ===
==== Candidates ====
- Carroll O. Switzer, Polk County Attorney

==== Results ====
Democratic primary results
Party	Candidate	Votes	%
Democratic	Carroll O. Switzer	56,195	100.00
Total votes		56,195	100.00

=== Republican primary ===
==== Candidates ====
- William S. Beardsley, State Representative
- Robert D. Blue, incumbent Governor

==== Results ====
Republican primary results
Party	Candidate	Votes	%
Republican	William S. Beardsley	189,938	59.78
Republican	Robert D. Blue (incumbent)	127,771	40.22
Total votes		317,709	100.00

== General election ==
=== Candidates ===
Major party candidates

- William S. Beardsley, Republican
- Carroll O. Switzer, Democratic

Other candidates

- C. E. Bierderman, Progressive
- Marvin Galbreath, Prohibition
- William F. Leonard, Socialist

=== Results ===
1948 Iowa gubernatorial election
Party	Candidate	Votes	%	±%
Republican	William S. Beardsley	553,900	55.68%	
Democratic	Carroll O. Switzer	434,432	43.67%	
Progressive	C. E. Bierderman	3,570	0.36%	
Prohibition	Marvin Galbreath	2,458	0.25%	
Socialist	William F. Leonard	471	0.05%	
Majority		119,468		
Turnout		994,833		
Republican hold		Swing		
