= William F. Riley (judge) =

American judge

Judge of the United States District Court for the Southern District of Iowa
- In office December 27, 1950 – December 29, 1956
- Appointed by: Harry S. Truman
- Preceded by: Carroll O. Switzer
- Succeeded by: Edwin Richley Hicklin

Personal details
- Born: William F. Riley; March 20, 1884 Ainsworth, Iowa
- Died: December 29, 1956 (aged 72)
- Party: Democratic
- Education: University of Iowa (A.B.); University of Iowa College of Law

William F. Riley (March 20, 1884 – December 29, 1956) was a United States district judge of the United States District Court for the Southern District of Iowa.

== Education and career ==
Born in Ainsworth, Iowa, Riley earned an Artium Baccalaureus degree from the State University of Iowa (now the University of Iowa) in 1907, and an unspecified law degree from University of Iowa College of Law in 1909. He was in private practice in Des Moines, Iowa from 1909 to 1942, except for his service during World War I as a lieutenant in the United States Army's legal department. After serving from 1942 to 1945 as a Special Assistant United States Attorney General and hearing officer for the Selective Service Bureau, Riley returned to his private practice with Carr, Cox, Evans, and Riley until 1950. During the latter period, he also served as President of the Iowa State Bar Association from 1949 to 1950, and was active in the leadership of the American Bar Association. He was an active member of the Democratic Party.

== Federal judicial service ==
Riley was nominated by President Harry S. Truman on November 29, 1950, to a seat on the United States District Court for the Southern District of Iowa vacated by Judge Carroll O. Switzer. He was confirmed by the United States Senate on December 14, 1950, and received his commission on December 27, 1950. His service terminated on December 29, 1956, due to his death.

== Sources ==
Legal offices
Preceded by Carroll O. Switzer	Judge of the United States District Court for the Southern District of Iowa; 1950–1956	Succeeded by Edwin Richley Hicklin
