= Lewis Williams Ross =

American politician, lawyer, legal academic (1827–1902)

Lewis Williams Ross (October 15, 1827 – November 22, 1902) was an American politician, lawyer, and legal academic.

The Ross family was Protestant, moved from Scotland to Ireland, and a later descendant, Daniel Ross, moved to the state of New Jersey in the United States. Ezekiel Ross, the grandfather of Lewis Ross, moved from New Jersey to Ohio in 1812, then settled in Butler County in 1814. Lewis Ross was born in Hanover Township, and lived on the family farm until the age of twenty, when he began attending Farmers' College in May 1848. In 1850, he transferred to Miami University, and graduated in 1852. He then studied law in Hamilton, Ohio, passing the bar in 1854. Ross first came to Iowa in 1856, residing in Cass County and practicing law there from 1858, before moving to Council Bluffs in 1861.

Ross was elected to the Iowa Senate in 1863 as a Republican for District 8, at the time encompassing Cass, Fremont, Mills, and Pottawattamie counties. His legislative term began on January 11, 1864, and ended on January 12, 1868, overlapping with his first term as a trustee of the University of Iowa. The same year that Ross stepped down from the Iowa General Assembly, he was reelected a UIowa trustee. From 1874, Ross served a six-year term on the UIowa board of regents. Following the conclusion of his tenure on the board in 1880, Ross became a professor of the University of Iowa College of Law, and was made chancellor of the college the following year, serving until 1887, when he was succeeded by James M. Love. While a faculty member, Lewis helped establish or organize the law, medical and homeopathic medical departments.

Lewis was married to Zoe Brown on July 12, 1855. He died at home in Council Bluffs on November 22, 1902, aged 75.
