= Marc Krickbaum =

American attorney (born 1979)

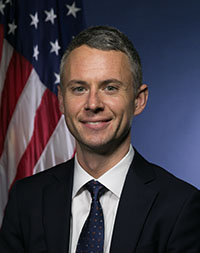
- Official portrait, 2017

United States Attorney for the Southern District of Iowa
- In office October 2, 2017 – January 7, 2021
- President: Donald Trump
- Preceded by: Nicholas A. Klinefeldt

Personal details
- Born: Marc Luther Krickbaum; 1979 (age 46–47) Waco, Texas, U.S.
- Education: University of Iowa (BA); Harvard Law School (JD)

Marc Luther Krickbaum (born 1979) is an American attorney who was the United States Attorney for the Southern District of Iowa from 2017 to 2021.

== Education ==
Krickbaum received a Bachelor of Arts in philosophy and political science with highest distinction and Phi Beta Kappa from the University of Iowa in 2001 and a Juris Doctor cum laude from Harvard Law School in 2006. Between college and law school, he taught English in Tokyo. During law school, Krickbaum worked at Mayer Brown in Chicago, at the International Criminal Tribunal for Rwanda in Arusha, and for professors Jack Goldsmith and Michael Sandel, and for the Civil Appellate Staff of the United States Department of Justice. He was also a finalist in the Ames Moot Court Competition and won awards for best brief and best oralist.

Krickbaum is married to Katherine, an Assistant Attorney General at the Office of the Attorney General of Iowa, and has one daughter.

== Legal career ==
After graduating from Harvard, Krickbaum clerked for Steven Colloton of the United States Court of Appeals for the Eighth Circuit and Mark Filip of the United States District Court for the Northern District of Illinois. He then served as counsel to the Deputy Attorney General from 2008 to 2009 and as a trial attorney in the Civil Division in 2009. From 2009 to 2013 and again from 2016 to 2017, Krickbaum was an Assistant United States Attorney for the Northern District of Illinois. From 2013 to 2016, he worked as an Assistant United States Attorney for the Southern District of Iowa. In his time as an AUSA, Krickbaum argued seventeen times before the Seventh and Eighth Circuits and assisted in the prosecution of Rod Blagojevich.

After being nominated to become U.S. Attorney for the Southern District of Iowa by President Donald Trump, Krickbaum was confirmed unanimously by the United States Senate on September 14, 2017. He was sworn into office on October 2, 2017. He resigned on January 7, 2021.

In July 2021, Krickbaum joined Winston & Strawn in Chicago as a partner.
