= List of first minority male lawyers and judges in Iowa =

This is a list of the first minority male lawyer(s) and judge(s) in Iowa. It includes the year in which the men were admitted to practice law (in parentheses). Also included are other distinctions, such as the first minority men in their state to graduate from law school or become a political figure.

== Firsts in Iowa's history ==
=== Law degree ===
- First African American male law graduate: Alexander Clark in 1879

=== Lawyers ===
- First African American male: A.H. Watkins (1874)
- First African American male to practice before the Iowa Supreme Court: Samuel K. Adams (1875)
- First Native American male: Thomas "Ted" St. Germaine (1904)
- First African American male to argue a case before the Supreme Court of Iowa: Samuel (S.) Joe Brown in 1906

=== State judges ===
- First African American male: George H. Woodson (1896) c. 1903 (upon his appointment as a Judge of Iowa's Sixth Judicial District)
- First African American male (municipal court): Luther T. Glanton, Jr. in 1958
- First Jewish American male (district court): Ansel Chapman in 1968
- First African American male (Fifth Judicial District): Luther T. Glanton, Jr. in 1976
- First male of part Vietnamese descent (Iowa Supreme Court): Christopher McDonald in 2019
- First African American male (Third Judicial District): Robert Tiefenthaler in 2022

=== United States Attorney ===
- First African American male: Don Carlos Nickerson in 1993

=== Iowa Judges Association ===
- First African American male (President): Odell McGhee II

=== Iowa State Bar Association ===
- First African American male (President): Henry Hamilton III in 2022

== Firsts in local history ==
- Luther T. Glanton, Jr.: First African American male to serve as the Assistant Polk County Attorney (1951)
- Dennis J. Stovall: First African American male to serve as a magistrate judge in Polk County, Iowa (1986)

== See also ==
- List of first minority male lawyers and judges in the United States

== Other topics of interest ==
- List of first women lawyers and judges in the United States
- List of first women lawyers and judges in Iowa
