= Judith Ellen Foster =

American lawyer (1840–1910)

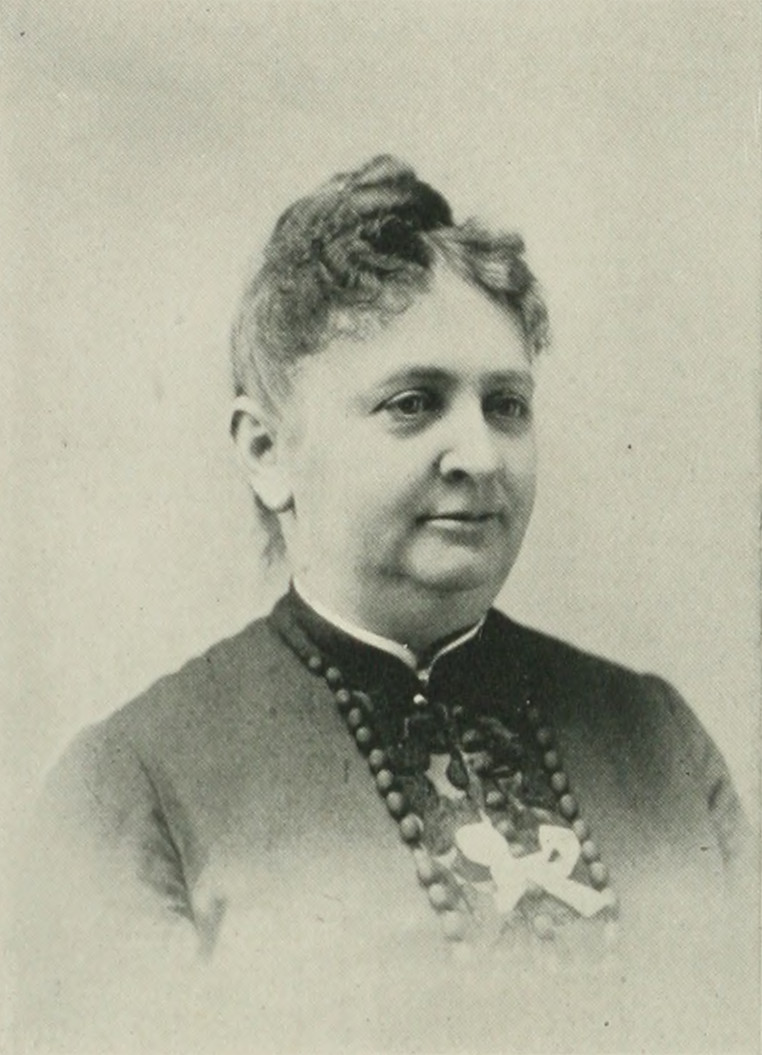
- "A Woman of the Century"
- Born: Judith Ellen Horton; November 3, 1840; Lowell, Massachusetts, U.S.
- Died: August 11, 1910 (aged 69); Washington, D.C., U.S.
- Resting place: Oak Hill Cemetery; Washington, D.C., U.S.
- Education: Genesee Wesleyan Seminary, Lima, New York
- Occupation: lawyer
- Known for: first woman in Iowa who was actually engaged in practice
- Spouse: Addison Avery Jr. (1837–1913)

Judith Ellen Horton Foster (November 3, 1840 – August 11, 1910) was an American lecturer, temperance worker, suffragist, and lawyer. She is thought to be the first woman in Iowa who was actually engaged in practice and the fourth woman admitted to practice before the Supreme Court of Iowa. In her time she was known as "The Iowa Lawyer".

== Early life ==
Judith Ellen Horton was born in Lowell, Massachusetts, on November 3, 1840. Her father was Rev. Jotham Horton (1798–1853), a Methodist preacher and abolitionist, and her mother was Judith Delano (1799–1847). On both parents' sides, she descended from the English Puritans who migrated to New England in the 1630s. Jotham Horton descended from Barnabas Horton (1600–1680) and his son Joseph Horton (1625–1696); the Hortons were originally from Leicestershire, England, and immigrated to America on the ship Swallow, captained by Jeremy Horton. They settled at Hampton, New Hampshire, but soon moved to New Haven, Connecticut, in 1640, and lastly at Southold, Long Island. Judith Delano descended from the De Lannoy family; the Fortune ship which replaced another ship, the Speedwell, arrived from England and sailed to Plymouth Colony in early July 1621, arriving on November 9, 1621, with Philippe De Lannoy among its passengers.

A radical abolitionist in the Methodist Episcopal Church, Rev. Jotham Horton withdrew and entered the antislavery Wesleyan Church. His eldest son, Jotham W. Horton, was killed by a mob on August 5, 1866, after the New Orleans Race Riot of July 30, 1866. At the time, he was pastor of the Coloseum Place Church.

Judith Horton was educated in public school and then at the Genesee Wesleyan Seminary, Lima, New York. Her parents died when she was still at the seminary, after which she went to live with her sister in Boston and became a teacher.

== Career ==
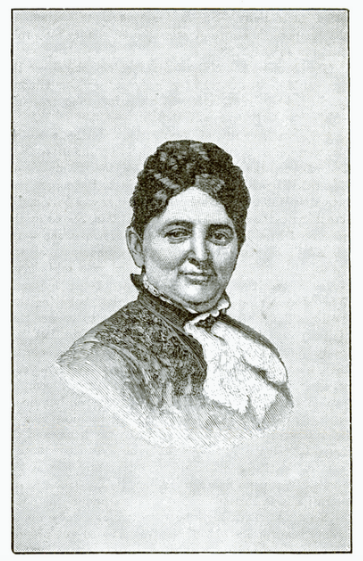
J. Ellen Foster (1883)

After her second marriage in 1869, she studied law and was admitted to the bar at Clinton, Iowa, in 1872. She occasionally helped her husband in trial cases and is thought to be the first woman in Iowa who was actually engaged in practice. She was admitted to practice in the Supreme Court of Iowa on October 20, 1875, the fourth woman admitted to practice before that tribunal. At first, she practiced alone, but afterwards, formed a partnership with her husband. She followed the legal profession for a number of years. In her time, she was known as "The Iowa Lawyer".

Foster was a Methodist and joined the temperance workers when the crusade opened. Her home in Clinton was burned, presumably by opponents of temperance. As a member of the Woman's Christian Temperance Union, she served as superintendent of the legislative department. Her knowledge of law enabled her to help the movement for the adoption of constitutional amendments in the various states aimed at securing the prohibition of the sale and manufacture of alcoholic liquors. She wrote a pamphlet on the legal bearings of the question. She was popular and successful as a lecturer: the DeWitt Observer reported on June 5, 1874, that "one of the best temperance lectures we ever listened to was delivered in the M. E. Church last Sabbath evening by Mrs. Foster of Clinton. The house was filled to overflowing. The audience was delighted with the lecture."

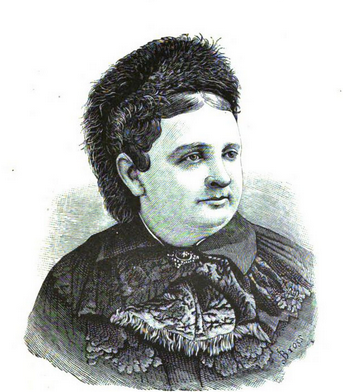
J. Ellen Foster (before 1889)

In 1887, Foster visited Europe, where she studied the temperance question. In England, she addressed large audiences. Returning to the United States, she took part in the International Council of Women in Washington. She published the Constitutional Amendment Manual (1882) and a number of pamphlets and magazine articles on temperance.

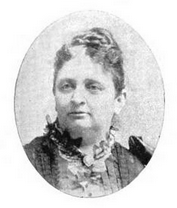
Foster at the World's Congress (1893)

Foster was a pronounced suffragist. She maintained that no organization had the right to pledge the influence of its members to any other organization for any purpose. Her views naturally led her to affiliate with the Non-Partisan National Woman's Christian Temperance Union, and she served that body for several years as corresponding secretary, having her office in Boston. She served her own state union as corresponding secretary and president for many years.

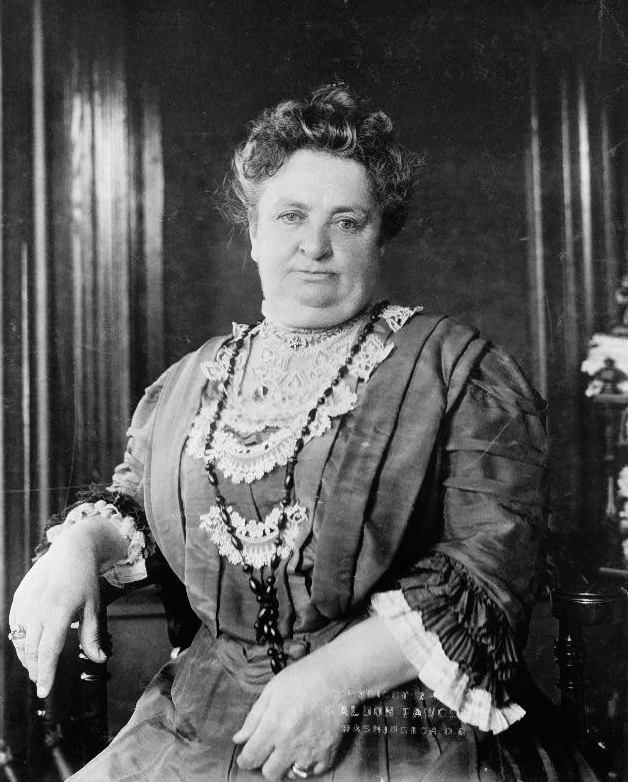
J. Ellen Foster

In 1900, Foster was with the Taft Commission in the Philippines to study the conditions of women and children there. Attorney General George W. Wickersham appointed her a member of a committee to investigate conditions in Federal prisons. As a representative of the American Red Cross, Foster and Clara Barton were sent to St. Petersburg by Secretary of State John Hay in 1902. In 1906, President Theodore Roosevelt appointed her to study conditions of women and child workers throughout the nation. In 1907, she was appointed a special agent of the Department of Justice, and in 1908 she advocated the addition of a women's wing to the Federal prison at Fort Leavenworth.

For many years Foster was the president of the Women's Republican Association and an active member of the Daughters of the American Revolution and the Young Women's Christian Association.

== Personal life ==
On March 14, 1860, she married Addison Avery Jr. (1837–1913) in Boston. They had one daughter, Mary Elizabeth, who died at the age of 5, and one son, William Horton Avery (1863–1946), who later changed the name to Foster. The marriage with Avery ended in divorce.

While in Chicago doing mission work, Horton met Elijah Caleb Foster (1844–1906), a lawyer. Horton moved to Clinton, Iowa, where on July 25, 1869, she married Foster. They had one son, Emory Miller Foster (1870–1907). Two daughters died young.

In 1880, the family moved to Washington, D.C., where E. C. Foster was appointed to the Department of the Treasury. She died on August 11, 1910, and was buried at Oak Hill Cemetery in Washington, D.C.

== See also ==
- List of first women lawyers and judges in Iowa
