= Leslie Winston =

American actress

- Occupation: Actress
- Years active: 1978–1993
- Spouse: Robert Yannetti (m. 1981)
- Children: 2

Leslie Winston is an American actress best known for playing Cindy, wife of Ben Walton, on the television series The Waltons from 1979 to 1981.

== Early years ==
Winston is the daughter of Hal and Carol Winston. Her interest in performing began with her involvement in a summer theater program between her fifth-grade and sixth-grade years. She acted in plays in junior high school and at Mason City High School, from which she graduated in 1974. She majored in drama for two years at the University of Iowa. She left there to transfer to UCLA, from which she left to take a role in a film one quarter before she would have graduated.

== Career ==
After making her first film, Winston was on a late-night television series. She obtained her role on The Waltons in 1979 and stayed with it through the series's end in 1981.

Winston played the part of Cindy, wife of Ben Walton (played by Eric Scott), in 42 episodes through the last 3 seasons of the series. Her debut on the show was in an episode called "The Outsider" (season 7, episode 20) in which Ben surprises the family by introducing them to his new wife Cindy, who is the episode's eponymous character. Winston later played Cindy in four of the series reunion TV movies from 1982 to 1993. These were A Wedding on Walton's Mountain (1982), Mother's Day on Walton's Mountain (1982), A Day for Thanks on Walton's Mountain (1982) and A Walton Thanksgiving Reunion (1993). She has also made earlier appearances on Quincy, M.E. (1976-1983 on NBC-TV) and L.A. Law (1986-1994, also on NBC).

While filming The Waltons, television series and reunion made-for-TV films, Winston became a close friend of her TV family: Judy Norton ("Mary Ellen Walton Willard") and Mary McDonough ("Erin Walton"), who played two of her sisters-in-law; the trio were known on the film set in California as "The Three Musketeers." McDonough, who was a bridesmaid at Winston's wedding, stresses the strong bonds that were created among the series cast and states in her autobiography that they are not just like a family but "really are a family." She also describes Winston and Norton as "real sisters."

Winston effectively retired as an actress a decade later in 1993, partly because of a broken elbow which incapacitated her for a year but mainly because she started her own family and wished to devote her time to raising her two daughters. Her husband is Bob Yannetti, an assistant TV director. She turned to the less demanding role of dubbing and looping and has worked on shows like Ally McBeal (1997-2002 on Fox) and Boston Legal (2004-2008 on ABC-TV). Her husband worked as director on some episodes of the latter.
