= James M. Love =

American judge

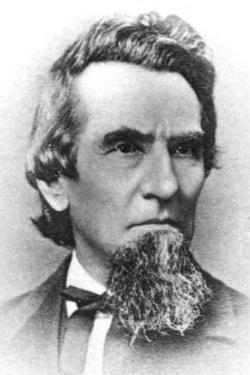

Judge of the United States District Court for the Southern District of Iowa
- In office July 20, 1882 – July 2, 1891
- Appointed by: operation of law
- Preceded by: Seat established by 22 Stat. 172
- Succeeded by: John Simson Woolson

Judge of the United States District Court for the District of Iowa
- In office October 5, 1855 – July 20, 1882
- Appointed by: Franklin Pierce
- Preceded by: John James Dyer
- Succeeded by: Seat abolished

Personal details
- Born: James Madison Love; March 4, 1820 Fairfax County, Virginia
- Died: July 2, 1891 (aged 71) Keokuk, Iowa
- Education: read law

James Madison Love (March 4, 1820 – July 2, 1891) was a United States district judge of the United States District Court for the District of Iowa and the United States District Court for the Southern District of Iowa.

== Education and career ==
Born on March 4, 1820, in Fairfax County, Virginia, the son of John and Mary Vermillion Love, Love moved with his mother to Zanesville, Ohio the year after his father died. He read law in 1840, first spending a year with his older brother, attorney Thomas R. Love, in Virginia, then in the office of Judge Richard Stillwell in Zanesville. He entered private practice in Coshocton County, Ohio from 1840 to 1846, and from 1848 to 1850. He served in the United States Army during the Mexican–American War from 1846 to 1848, as a captain of the 3rd Ohio Regiment. He continued private practice in Keokuk, Iowa starting in 1850. He was a Democratic member of the Iowa Senate from 1853 to 1856.

== Federal judicial service ==
Love received a recess appointment from President Franklin Pierce on October 5, 1855, to a seat on the United States District Court for the District of Iowa vacated by Judge John James Dyer. He was nominated to the same position by President Pierce on February 7, 1856. He was confirmed by the United States Senate on February 25, 1856, and received his commission on December 21, 1856. Love was reassigned by operation of law to the United States District Court for the Southern District of Iowa on July 20, 1882, to a new seat authorized by 22 Stat. 172. His service terminated on July 2, 1891, due to his death in Keokuk. He was the longest serving federal judge to be appointed by President Pierce.

=== Other service ===
Concurrent with his federal judicial service, Love was a Professor of commercial law for the State University of Iowa (now the University of Iowa starting in 1875. He was Chancellor of the University of Iowa College of Law from 1887 to 1890, serving between the tenures of Lewis Williams Ross and Emlin McClain.

== Personal life ==
Father of William T. Love, known for digging the Love Canal.

== See also ==
- List of United States federal judges by longevity of service

== Sources ==
Legal offices
Preceded by John James Dyer	Judge of the United States District Court for the District of Iowa; 1855–1882	Succeeded by Seat abolished
Preceded by Seat established by 22 Stat. 172	Judge of the United States District Court for the Southern District of Iowa; 1882–1891	Succeeded by John Simson Woolson
