= Dennis Remmert =

American football player (1938–2020)

No. 53
- Position: Linebacker

Personal information
- Born: November 1, 1938; Traer, Iowa, U.S.
- Died: February 15, 2020 (aged 81); Waterloo, Iowa, U.S.
- Listed height: 6 ft 3 in (1.91 m)
- Listed weight: 215 lb (98 kg)

Career information
- High school: Mason City (IA)
- College: Northern Iowa

Career history

Playing
- Buffalo Bills (1960)

Coaching
- Northern Iowa (1961) Graduate assistant; Iowa Central (1963); Northern Iowa (1964) Scouting coordinator/freshman football coach; Northern Iowa (1971–1986) Defensive coordinator; Northern Iowa (1986–1988) Assistant head coach
- Stats at Pro Football Reference

Dennis L. Remmert (November 1, 1938 – February 15, 2020) was an American football player who played with the Buffalo Bills. He played college football at the University of Northern Iowa.

He died on February 15, 2020, in Waterloo, Iowa at age 81.
