= List of United States federal courthouses in Iowa =

Following is a list of current and former courthouses of the United States federal court system located in Iowa. Each entry indicates the name of the building along with an image, if available, its location and the jurisdiction it covers, the dates during which it was used for each such jurisdiction, and, if applicable the person for whom it was named, and the date of renaming. Dates of use will not necessarily correspond with the dates of construction or demolition of a building, as pre-existing structures may be adapted or court use, and former court buildings may later be put to other uses. Also, the official name of the building may be changed at some point after its use as a federal court building has been initiated.

== Courthouses ==
Courthouse	City	Image	Street address	Jurisdiction	Dates of use	Named for
U.S. Post Office & Court House	Cedar Rapids		305 2nd Avenue Southeast.	N.D. Iowa	1900–1908; Built in 1895; razed in 1908; successor courthouse built at same location.	n/a
U.S. Post Office & Court House^{†}	Cedar Rapids		305 2nd Avenue Southeast.	N.D. Iowa	1910–1933; Now owned by Linn County and renamed the Witwer Building.	n/a
U.S. Post Office & Court House	Cedar Rapids		101 1st Street Southeast	N.D. Iowa	1933–2012; Now used as the City Hall	n/a
U.S. Court House	Cedar Rapids		111 Seventh Avenue Southeast	N.D. Iowa	2012–present	n/a
U.S. Post Office & Court House	Council Bluffs		?	S.D. Iowa	1888–? Fate of building unknown.	n/a
U.S. Post Office & Court House	Council Bluffs		8 South 6th Street	S.D. Iowa	1959–present	n/a
U.S. Post Office & Court House†	Creston		222 Maple Street	S.D. Iowa	1903–? Now owned by the state.	n/a
U.S. Post Office	Davenport		131 East 4th Street	S.D. Iowa	1896–1932; Razed in 1932; successor courthouse built at same location.	n/a
Davenport U.S. Courthouse^{†}	Davenport		131 East 4th Street	S.D. Iowa	1933–present	n/a
U.S. Court House & Post Office	Des Moines		Fifth Street & Court Avenue	D. Iowa; S.D. Iowa	1871–1882; 1882–1929; Razed in 1968.	n/a
Des Moines U.S. Courthouse^{†}	Des Moines		123 East Walnut Street	S.D. Iowa	1929–2023	n/a
Des Moines U.S. Courthouse	Des Moines		111 East Locust Street	S.D. Iowa	2023–present	n/a
U.S. Bankruptcy Court	Des Moines		110 East Court Avenue	S.D. Iowa	?–present	n/a
U.S. Custom House & Post Office	Dubuque		?	D. Iowa; N.D. Iowa	1866–1882; 1882–1934; Razed in 1947.	n/a
U.S. Post Office & Courthouse^{†}	Dubuque		350 West 6th Street	N.D. Iowa	1934–present	n/a
U.S. Post Office	Fort Dodge		?	N.D. Iowa	1895–1911; Fate of building unknown.	n/a
U.S. Post Office	Fort Dodge		?	N.D. Iowa	1911–? Fate of building unknown.	n/a
U.S. Post Office & Court House^{†}	Keokuk		25 North 7th Street	S.D. Iowa	1890–1957; Now the Lee County Courthouse.	n/a
U.S. Post Office & Courthouse	Mason City		211 North Delaware Avenue	N.D. Iowa	1932–? Still in use as a post office.	n/a
U.S. Post Office & Court House^{†}	Ottumwa		105 3rd Street East	S.D. Iowa	1912–? Now Ottumwa City Hall.	n/a
U.S. Post Office & Court House	Sioux City		405 6th Street	N.D. Iowa	1897–1932; Partially demolished in 1995; remnants incorporated into new city hall.	n/a
Federal Building & U.S. Court House^{†}	Sioux City		316 6th Street	N.D. Iowa	1934–present	n/a
U.S. Post Office & Court House	Waterloo		?	N.D. Iowa	1905–1937; Razed in 1937.	n/a
U.S. Post Office & Court House	Waterloo		415 Commercial Street	N.D. Iowa	1938–? Now the Waterloo Public Library.	n/a

== Key ==
^{†}	Listed on the National Register of Historic Places (NRHP)
^{††}	NRHP-listed and also designated as a National Historic Landmark
