= Romonda Belcher-Ford =

American judge

The Honourable Romonda Belcher-Ford

District Associate Judge of the Fifth Judicial District of Iowa
- In office August 20, 2010 – 2024
- Nominated by: District 5C nomination commission
- Appointed by: Kim Reynolds
- Preceded by: Joe E. Smith
- Succeeded by: Jordan Brackey

Personal details
- Born: 1968 (age 57–58) Plymouth, North Carolina
- Education: Howard University (BA); Drake University Law School (JD)
- Occupation: Former district associate judge
- Profession: Assistant County Attorney (1995–2010) Assistant Polk County Judge (2010-2024)
- First Black woman to serve as a judge in the state of Iowa.

Romonda Belcher-Ford (born in 1968) became the first Black woman to serve as a judge in the State of Iowa upon her confirmation on August, 2010. She is a former Assistant County Attorney and retired District Associate Judge in Iowa's Fifth Judicial District, serving Polk County. She served 15 years as an attorney dealing with juvenile delinquency and dependency cases, and served the court as an Associate Judge between August 2010 and early 2024.

== Early life and education ==
Romonda Belcher-Ford was the second-born in 1968 to a middle-class family in Plymouth, North Carolina, a small town of less than 4,000 at the time. Her mother worked at a department store as a salesperson while raising two other kids. Her father attained his GED and worked for wages at an asbestos-filled pulp-mill before starting his own enterprise installing satellite TV systems. She recounts that both worked hard to instill the importance of an education and religious faith in her childhood. Her mother also assured she was involved in the community, participating in the local National Association for the Advancement of Colored People (NAACP), and having her enroll in organ lessons, theatre, and marching band. In high school, she took several advanced placement classes where she gained the skills to excel in her undergraduate education. She also learned quickly that her racial identity would become a barrier to attaining social and professional success when she was only one of few Black students to be in advanced classes, or to even attend the birthday parties of white students. One teacher in particular encouraged her to attend Howard University for her undergrad as it was a prominent HBCU that would reinforce her intersectional identity and propel her career.

In fall of 1986, she began the pursuit of a Bachelor's degree in Administration of Justice with a minor in Broadcast journalism at Howard University. Howard, a school which predominantly enrolls African Americans, was a culture shock to her as she was away from family and for the first time in an environment with like-minded Black scholars. She had always admired the works of classical Civil Rights activists such as Martin Luther King Jr. and Rosa Parks, but she was quickly exposed to and inspired by the works of other Black activists such as James Baldwin, Frederick Douglas, Charles Drew, Mary Mcleod Bethune, and Garret Morgan. After graduating from Howard in 1990, receiving an honors distinction bachelor's degree, she worked for two years before enrolling at Drake Law School in pursuit of a Juris Doctor.

Romonda Belcher-Ford learned of Iowa's rich African American history at Drake University, where she was also inspired by Gertrude Rush, the first Black woman to be licensed to practice law in the state of Iowa. Additionally she built a close mentorship with Willie Stevenson Glanton, the first Black woman to be elected to the Iowa State legislature. Throughout her time in Law School, She quickly gained practical experience at Parrish & Kruideiner, the Drake Legal Clinic, the Iowa Department of transportation, and clerking for Justice Louis Lovorato. While she was always driven to serve on the bench, it was her experience in these various legal fields that inspired her to pursue public service as she felt it was the environment where she could make the biggest difference. She was recognized by the Drake Law School dean David Walker for her mental acuity, grace, and principality. After graduating and receiving her Juris Doctor in May 1995, she stayed in Des Moines and began to work as an attorney only five months later in September. At a church celebration after her graduation, she met Stevenson Glanton who was the first African American woman admitted in the Iowa bar to practice law. She accredits much of her drive for excellence after her graduation to Glanton, who she considered a second mother and called Ms. G.

== Career ==
=== Prosecutor, Polk County Attorneys Office (1995–2010) ===
Immediately after her graduation from Drake University Law School, the dean, David Walker, urged Polk County attorney John Sarcone to take Romonda Belcher-Ford as an assistant attorney, marking the beginning of her career. She took a prosecutorial role wherein her docket dealt primarily with cases of domestic violence, substance abuse, and operating while intoxicated (OWI) - this experience would be formative in shaping her trauma-informed jurisprudence that she would go on to become well known for. In 2003, her sister was murdered in an instance of domestic violence, leaving behind two children. Despite her desire to return home, her family urged her to remain in Des Moines to continue building her career and her own family.

=== Path to the bench ===
Romonda Belcher-Ford ascended to the district court in the context of the judicial power vacuum created by the April 2008 case Varnum v. Brien wherein the Iowa supreme court affirmed the legality of gay marriage. The highly controversial decision resulted in the removal of three judges in the following retention elections in 2010. While these did not directly effect the Polk County district elections, it demonstrates the political volatility after the affirmation of homosexual marriage; she succeeded in winning in a political environment marked with unpredictability and rapid judicial backlash. She had applied at least twice beforehand. First, she was told she was too young and inexperienced in criminal law, a difficulty she would overcome by working as a prosecutor in juvenile cases in the Polk County Attorney's office; then she was told she was too inexperienced in civil law, which she overcame by taking civil positions in the same office.

Upon the retirement of former district associate Judge Joe E. Smith in 2010, Romonda Belcher-Ford applied alongside 20 other highly qualified candidates for the position. The Iowa State Judicial system involves a multi-tiered merit-based peer selection process through which a nominating commission restricts the applicants to three competitors which sitting judges interview and pick via majority vote. Her nomination relied upon the approval of the majority of the sitting judges including Carol S. Elgy, Cynthia M. Moisan, Gregory D. Brandt, James D. Birkenholz, Louise M. Jacobs, William A. Prince, Carol L. Coppola, Odell G. Mghee II, Colin J. Witt, and Raechel E. Seymour; Having been extensively interviewed by the court, she was recognized for her willingness to listen and compassionate practice in the courtroom. The names of her opponents and the final vote tally are not public record, but she was officially confirmed on August 20, 2010.

=== District Associate Judge (2010–2024) ===
Rolonda Belcher-Fords jurisprudence is one that emphasizes compassion and understanding above all else. She is well known in the Iowa Judicial system for her acuity in adjudicating cases involving people that have experienced adverse childhood experiences (ACEs) or other forms of psychological trauma. She has spent years training others in the legal practice to understand the role of psychological trauma in substance abuse, criminology, and recidivism. She emphasizes in her writing that small changes, such as changing the seating in a courtroom, can change the environment from one of confrontation to one of mediation and cooperation. She takes a non-essentialist point of view on intersectionality in that she believes that her identity as a Black woman, while essential to her life experience, does not directly cause different decision-making than that of her white and/or male peers.

The Iowa State district courts require a retention election after an initial two-year term, where retainment results in an additional six-year term. As opposed to other states like Illinois or Texas which run competitive partisan elections, Iowa simply asks voters whether to retain a judge without providing partisan affiliation; asking a simple "Yes, retain" or "No, remove". In 2012, Romonda Belcher-Ford was retained, receiving another 6 years on the bench of the Polk county district court. Of the 9 judges up for retention, she was the least popular judge overall, winning 76.53% of the vote. She also received the second-least total votes, where 117,236 voted either yes or no. In 2018, she faced another retention election wherein the results are not public, she, however, was successful as she continued to serve as an associate judge for the Polk County district until 2024.

=== Retirement (2024–present) ===
After her retirement in 2024, she began to work as adjunct faculty at Drake University Law School, mentoring African American law students in particular. She spends much of her time opening doors for students that are part of the Drake University Law School Black Law Students Association which she has been regularly attending since her leadership in 1994. She was succeeded by Jordan Brackey, a Kim Reynolds appointed judge.

== Personal life ==
Romonda Belcher-Ford married to Wayne W. Ford, a seven-term Iowa state representative. She has one child.

== Legacy ==
Romonda Belcher-Ford was inducted into the Iowa Women's Hall of Fame in 2023 and recognized as Drake Law School's Alumna of the Year in 2024.

Additionally, she took multiple simultaneous leadership positions as the Iowa State Bar Association (ISBA) co-chair of the Women & Minorities committee and of the ISBA Best Practices for Inclusiveness Task Force.
