= Charles Almon Dewey =

American judge

Senior Judge of the United States District Court for the Southern District of Iowa
- In office March 1, 1949 – March 2, 1958

Judge of the United States District Court for the Southern District of Iowa
- In office January 31, 1928 – March 1, 1949
- Appointed by: Calvin Coolidge
- Preceded by: Seat established by 45 Stat. 52
- Succeeded by: Carroll O. Switzer

Personal details
- Born: Charles Almon Dewey; September 11, 1877 Washington, Iowa
- Died: March 2, 1958 (aged 80) Des Moines, Iowa
- Education: University of Iowa College of Law (LL.B.)

Charles Almon Dewey (September 11, 1877 – March 2, 1958) was a United States district judge of the United States District Court for the Southern District of Iowa.

== Education and career ==
Born in Washington, Iowa, Dewey attended Oberlin College in Ohio. He was a Corporal in the United States Volunteers during the Spanish–American War. In 1901, he received a Bachelor of Laws from the University of Iowa College of Law, and entered private practice in Washington, Iowa. He was city attorney of Washington from 1905 to 1909, and county attorney for Washington County, Iowa from 1909 to 1915. From 1918 to 1928, he served as a state district court judge in Iowa's sixth judicial district.

== Federal judicial service ==
In 1927, a backlog of unresolved cases had developed in the United States District Court for the Southern District of Iowa. On January 19, 1928, President Calvin Coolidge signed into law a bill that authorized the appointment of a second judge to the Southern District of Iowa, with the proviso that when the existing judgeship becomes vacant, it shall not be filled unless authorized by Congress.

Dewey was nominated by President Calvin Coolidge on January 23, 1928, to the United States District Court for the Southern District of Iowa, to a new seat authorized by 45 Stat. 52. He was confirmed by the United States Senate on January 31, 1928, and received his commission the same day. He assumed senior status on March 1, 1949. As a senior judge, he was given temporary assignments three times, sitting by designation in St. Louis, Missouri, New York City, New York and Miami, Florida. His service terminated on March 2, 1958, due to his death in Des Moines, Iowa.

Legal offices
Preceded by Seat established by 45 Stat. 52	Judge of the United States District Court for the Southern District of Iowa; 1928–1949	Succeeded by Carroll O. Switzer
