= Robert W. Pratt =

American judge (1947–2026)

Senior Judge of the United States District Court for the Southern District of Iowa
- In office July 1, 2012 – January 28, 2026

Chief Judge of the United States District Court for the Southern District of Iowa
- In office 2006–2011
- Preceded by: Ronald Earl Longstaff
- Succeeded by: James E. Gritzner

Judge of the United States District Court for the Southern District of Iowa
- In office May 27, 1997 – July 1, 2012
- Appointed by: Bill Clinton
- Preceded by: Harold Duane Vietor
- Succeeded by: Stephanie Marie Rose

Personal details
- Born: May 3, 1947 Emmetsburg, Iowa, U.S.
- Died: January 28, 2026 (aged 78) Clive, Iowa, U.S.
- Spouse: Rose Mary Vito
- Children: 3
- Education: Iowa Lakes Community College (AA); Loras College (BA); Creighton University (JD)

Robert William Pratt (May 3, 1947 – January 28, 2026) was a United States district judge of the United States District Court for the Southern District of Iowa.

== Early life and education ==
Pratt was born in Emmetsburg, Iowa, on May 3, 1947. He received an Associate of Arts degree from Iowa Lakes Community College in 1967, a Bachelor of Arts degree from Loras College in 1969, and a Juris Doctor from Creighton University School of Law in 1972. In college, he worked as a construction laborer and factory worker. He was a staff attorney of Polk County Legal Aid Society from 1973 to 1974, during which time his colleagues included future Senator Tom Harkin.

== Career ==
Pratt was in private practice in Des Moines, Iowa, from 1975 to 1997 at Funaro, Brick, & Pratt, then at Hedberg, Brick, Tann, Pratt & Ward, and then as a sole practitioner. His areas of practice included personal injury, workers' compensation, Social Security, federal indigent criminal defense, and union-side labor law. When he was confirmed, he described himself as having "devoted all of [his] practice to the problems of the low income and working class people of Iowa." He joked that he "is the only lawyer to have left legal aid and gotten poorer clients." He also worked for Harkin's political campaigns.

=== Federal judicial service ===
On January 7, 1997, Pratt was nominated by President Bill Clinton to a seat on the United States District Court for the Southern District of Iowa vacated by Judge Harold Duane Vietor. Senator Tom Harkin recommended Pratt for the position. Pratt was confirmed by the United States Senate on May 23, 1997, and received his commission on May 27, 1997. He served as chief judge from 2006 to 2011. He assumed senior status on July 1, 2012. Pratt became inactive in 2023.

Pratt was a longtime opponent of the United States Federal Sentencing Guidelines and mandatory sentencing. He wrote in 1999 that "we [have] built a system that incarcerates our fellow citizens for inordinately long periods of time, wastes huge amounts of taxpayer dollars, ruins lives, and does not accomplish the stated purpose." Even after the Sentencing Guidelines became advisory in United States v. Booker, the United States Court of Appeals for the Eighth Circuit continued to strictly enforce them, and it reversed Pratt nine times for sentencing below the guidelines. In one of those cases, Gall v. United States, the Supreme Court of the United States reversed the Eighth Circuit and reaffirmed Pratt's decision to depart from the Sentencing Guidelines to sentence a man to probation rather than prison for a drug crime. Pratt taught sentencing seminars through the Federal Judicial Center. He also issued notable decisions upholding Iowa's campaign finance regulations and merit selection system for choosing state judges.

In a December 28, 2020, interview with the Associated Press, Pratt criticized President Donald Trump for his pardons, stating that "[i]t's not surprising that a criminal like Trump pardons other criminals" and that "[a]pparently to get a pardon, one has to be either a Republican, a convicted child murderer or a turkey." The group Fix the Court complained about Pratt's remarks, which were found to be inappropriate upon review by Chief Judge Lavenski Smith of the United States Court of Appeals for the Eighth Circuit. Pratt subsequently issued an apology.

On September 13, 2021, Pratt issued a temporary restraining order blocking Iowa House File 847, which prohibits local school districts from putting mask mandates in place. This temporary restraining order allowed local school boards to pass their own mask mandates. The Eighth Circuit affirmed Judge Pratt's decision.

== Personal life and death ==
Pratt and his wife, Rose Mary (née Vito), had three children. Pratt was an elected member of the American Law Institute.

Pratt died from a heart attack at a gym in Clive, Iowa, on January 28, 2026, at the age of 78.

Legal offices
Preceded by Harold Duane Vietor	Judge of the United States District Court for the Southern District of Iowa; 1997–2012	Succeeded by Stephanie Marie Rose
Preceded by Ronald Earl Longstaff	Chief Judge of the United States District Court for the Southern District of Iowa; 2006–2011	Succeeded by James E. Gritzner
