= John Alfred Jarvey =

American judge (born 1956)

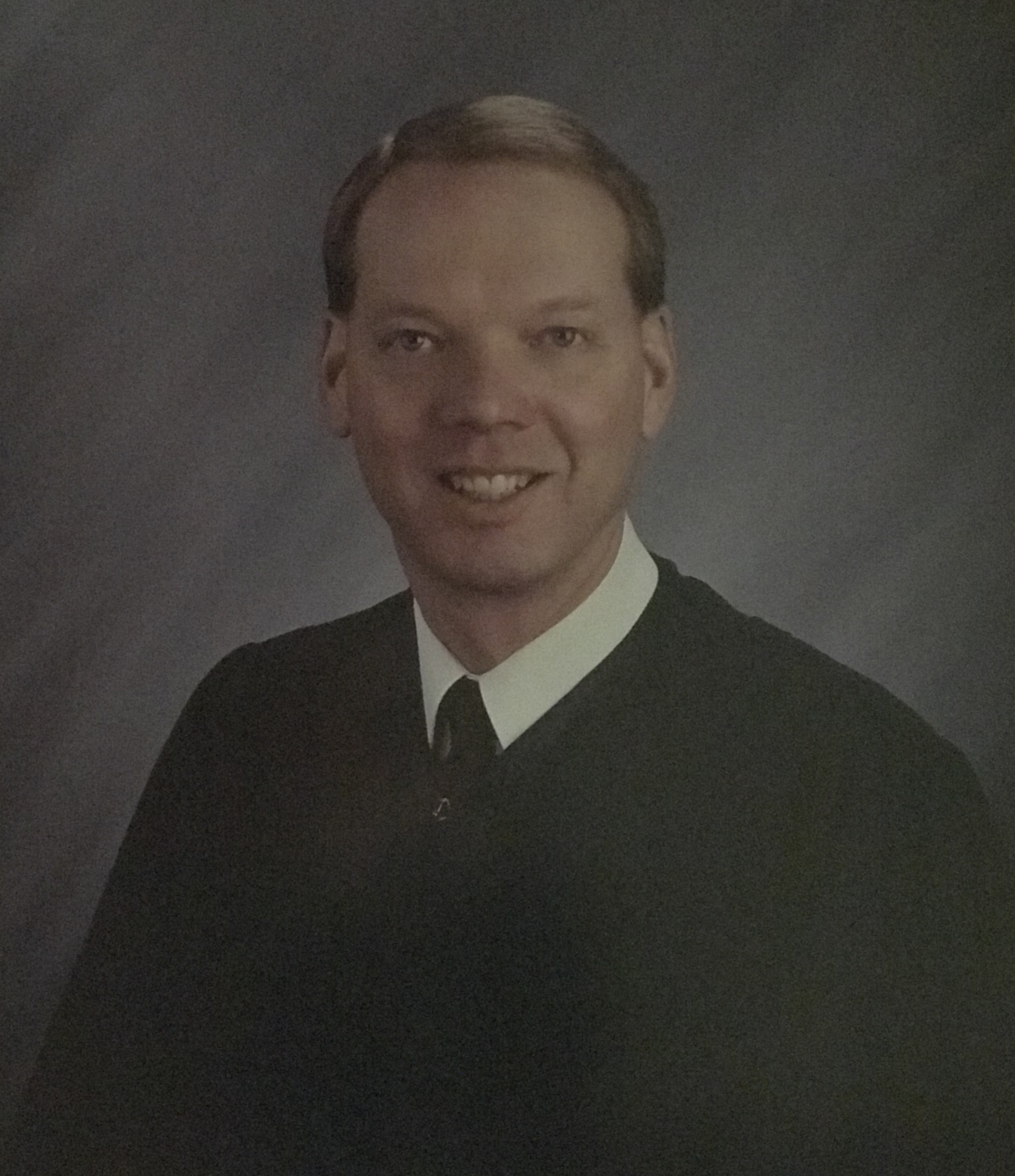

Chief Judge of the United States District Court for the Southern District of Iowa
- In office March 1, 2015 – February 10, 2022
- Preceded by: James E. Gritzner
- Succeeded by: Stephanie M. Rose

Judge of the United States District Court for the Southern District of Iowa
- In office March 14, 2007 – March 18, 2022
- Appointed by: George W. Bush
- Preceded by: Ronald Earl Longstaff
- Succeeded by: Stephen H. Locher

Magistrate Judge of the United States District Court for the Northern District of Iowa
- In office 1987–2007

Personal details
- Born: September 14, 1956 (age 69) Minneapolis, Minnesota, U.S.
- Education: University of Akron (BS); Drake University (JD)

John Alfred Jarvey (born September 14, 1956) is a former United States district judge of the United States District Court for the Southern District of Iowa.

== Education and career ==
Born in Minneapolis, Minnesota, Jarvey received a Bachelor of Science degree in accounting from the University of Akron in 1978 and a Juris Doctor from Drake University Law School in 1981. He also attended Concordia College.

After law school, Jarvey served as a law clerk to Judge Donald E. O'Brien of the United States District Court for the Northern District of Iowa from 1981 to 1983. He was a trial attorney of the Criminal Division of the United States Department of Justice from 1983 to 1987. As a prosecutor, he specialized in fraud in the pharmaceutical industry. He taught trial advocacy at the University of Iowa College of Law and mock trial at Cedar Rapids Washington High School. He is married to Mary Jarvey, a piano teacher.

== Federal judicial service ==
Jarvey was a United States magistrate judge of the United States District Court for the Northern District of Iowa from 1987 to 2007. As a magistrate judge, Jarvey conducted over 400 mediations. On January 9, 2007, Jarvey was nominated by President George W. Bush to a seat on the United States District Court for the Southern District of Iowa vacated by Ronald Earl Longstaff. The American Bar Association rated him unanimously as "well-qualified". Jarvey was confirmed by the United States Senate on March 8, 2007, and received his commission on March 14, 2007. He served as Chief Judge from March 1, 2015, to February 10, 2022. Cases he oversaw included the Kent Sorenson bribery scandal. Jarvey retired from active service on March 18, 2022.

As Chief Judge, Jarvey was a principal force behind the building of a new federal courthouse in Des Moines. He also regularly sat by designation on other district courts, especially the United States District Court for the District of Arizona.

Legal offices
Preceded by Ronald Earl Longstaff	Judge of the United States District Court for the Southern District of Iowa; 2007–2022	Succeeded by Stephen H. Locher
Preceded by James E. Gritzner	Chief Judge of the United States District Court for the Southern District of Iowa; 2015–2022	Succeeded by Stephanie M. Rose
