= Stephen H. Locher =

American judge (born 1978)

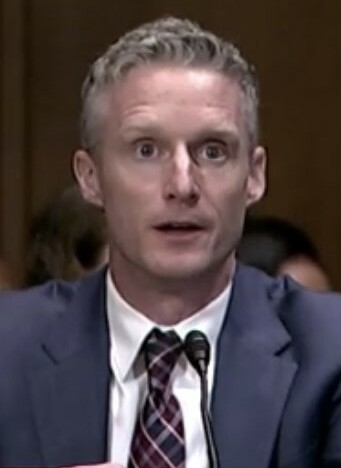

Judge of the United States District Court for the Southern District of Iowa
- Incumbent
- Assumed office July 18, 2022
- Appointed by: Joe Biden
- Preceded by: John Alfred Jarvey

Magistrate Judge of the United States District Court for the Southern District of Iowa
- In office June 1, 2021 – July 18, 2022
- Preceded by: Celeste Bremer
- Succeeded by: William P. Kelly

Personal details
- Born: Stephen Henley Locher; 1978 (age 47–48) Mason City, Iowa, U.S.
- Spouse: Sarah Crane
- Children: 4
- Education: University of Notre Dame (BA); Harvard University (JD)

Stephen Henley Locher (born 1978) is an American lawyer who has served as a United States district judge of the United States District Court for the Southern District of Iowa since 2022. He previously served as a United States magistrate judge of the same court from 2021 to 2022.

== Education ==
Locher's hometown is Mason City, Iowa. He received his Bachelor of Arts from the University of Notre Dame, magna cum laude, in 2000 and his Juris Doctor from Harvard Law School in 2003. During law school, he taught economics at Harvard University.

== Legal career ==
Locher served as a law clerk for Judge John R. Gibson of the United States Court of Appeals for the Eighth Circuit from 2003 to 2004. From 2004 to 2008, he was an associate at Goldberg Kohn in Chicago, where he specialized in commercial law. From 2008 to 2013, he was an Assistant United States Attorney in the U.S. Attorney's Office for the Southern District of Iowa. As a federal prosecutor, he prosecuted pro basketball player Rumeal Robinson for bank fraud and bribery. He was then a partner at Belin McCormick, P.C., in Des Moines, Iowa from 2013 to 2021, specializing in commercial litigation, white-collar criminal defense, and appeals. At Belin McCormick, his partners included Matthew McDermott. With McDermott, he represented Sholom Rubashkin.

== Federal judicial service ==
=== United States magistrate judge service ===
On December 21, 2020, Locher was selected to serve as a United States magistrate judge. He was sworn in on June 1, 2021.

=== District court service ===
On February 7, 2022, Senators Charles Grassley and Joni Ernst recommended Locher to fill a vacancy on the Southern District of Iowa. On April 13, 2022, President Joe Biden announced his intent to nominate Locher to serve as a United States district judge of the United States District Court for the Southern District of Iowa. On April 25, 2022, his nomination was sent to the Senate. President Biden nominated Locher to the seat vacated by Judge John Alfred Jarvey, who retired on March 18, 2022. On May 11, 2022, a hearing on his nomination was held before the Senate Judiciary Committee. On June 9, 2022, his nomination was reported out of committee by a voice vote, with Senator Josh Hawley voted "nay" on record. On July 14, 2022, the United States Senate confirmed his nomination by a voice vote. He received his judicial commission on July 18, 2022.

==== Notable rulings ====
On December 29, 2023, Locher blocked parts of a bill that would ban books. On January 12, 2024, Iowa Governor Kim Reynolds appealed his ruling, and the United States Court of Appeals for the Eighth Circuit heard oral arguments on his ruling on June 18, 2024. The appeals court appeared skeptical of Locher's injunction, suggesting he may have overstepped and that the plaintiffs lacked standing. Locher reheard the case following the appeals court's guidance, and on March 25, 2025 he reinstated the preliminary injunction against enforcement of sections of the law that would ban books from school libraries.

== Personal life ==
Locher is married to Sarah Crane, a judge of the Iowa District Court, with whom he has four children.

Legal offices
Preceded by John Alfred Jarvey	Judge of the United States District Court for the Southern District of Iowa; 2022–present	Incumbent
