= Gertrude Rush =

American lawyer

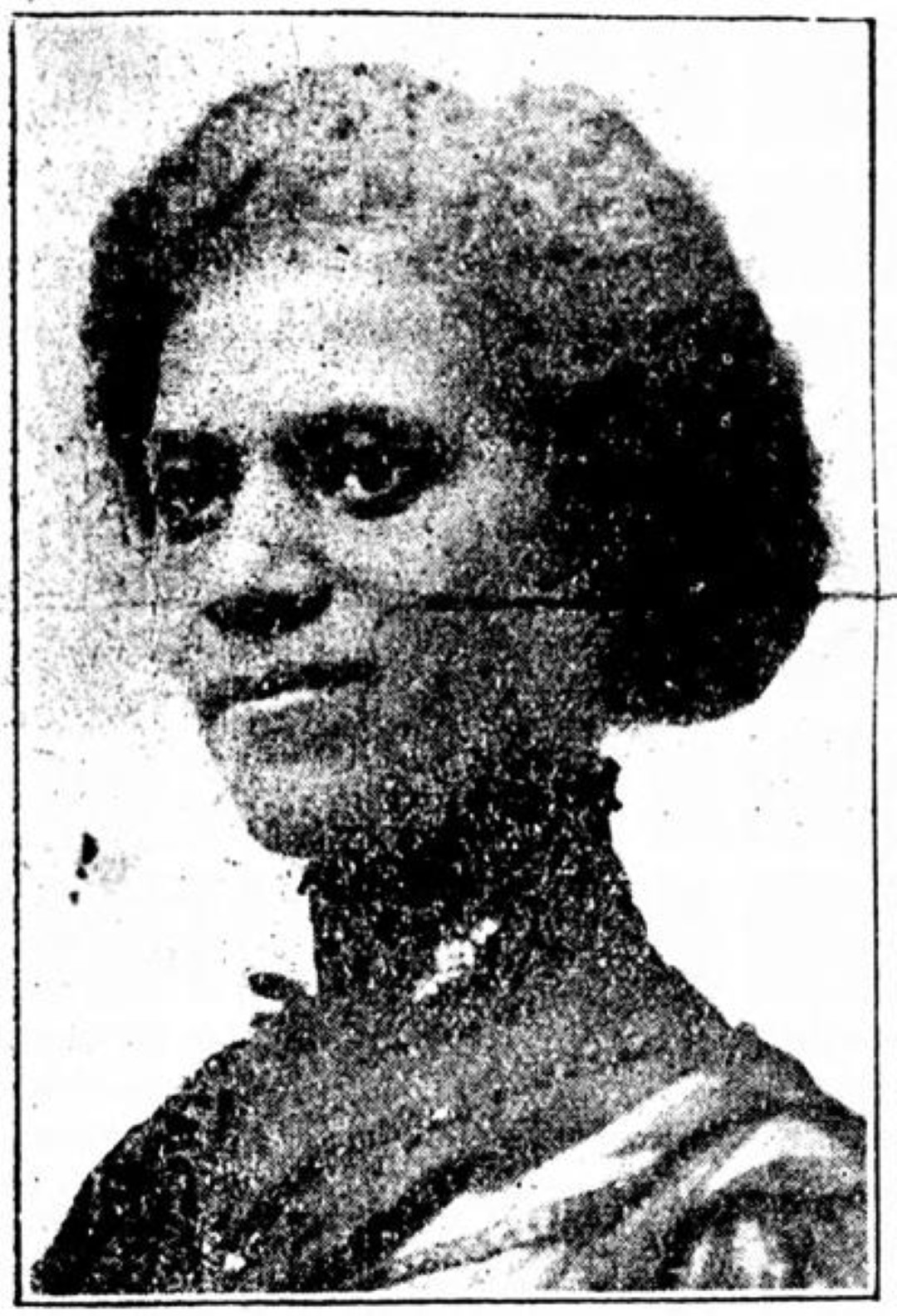
Gertrude Rush in 1917

Gertrude Elzora Durden Rush (August 5, 1880 – September 5, 1962) was the first African-American female lawyer in Iowa, admitted to the Iowa bar in 1918. She helped found the National Bar Association in 1925.

== Life and career ==
Gertrude Elzora Durden was born on August 5, 1880, in Navasota, Texas, to Sarah E. and Frank Durden. She attended high schools in Parsons, Kansas, and Quincy, Illinois. She taught in Oswego, Kansas; the Indian Territory; and Des Moines, Iowa. She married in 1907 and earned a Bachelor of Arts degree from Des Moines College in 1914, then earned a law degree through distance learning facility La Salle Extension University. She remained the only African American female lawyer in Iowa until 1950.

Gertrude Rush is featured in the July 1914 edition of The Crisis magazine as a recent graduate of Des Moines University (1865–1929).

She took over her husband's law practice after his death. In 1921 she was elected president of the Colored Bar Association. In 1925 Rush and four other black lawyers founded the Negro Bar Association after being denied admission to the American Bar Association.

Rush was also an activist in the civil rights and suffrage movements, as well as an author and playwright.

== Tributes ==
- The Gertrude E. Rush Distinguished Service Award is given by the National Bar Association.
- As of 2017, the Iowa National Bar Association is erecting a public art project, A Monumental Journey, in honor of Rush and the others who opened the profession of law to African Americans.

== See also ==
- List of first women lawyers and judges in Iowa
