= 1854 Iowa Senate election =

- 1854

19 out of 31 seats in the Iowa State Senate 16 seats needed for a majority
	Majority party	Minority party
Party	Democratic	Whig
Last election	20	11
Seats after	17	14
Seat change	▼3	▲3
President of the Iowa Senate before election
William E. Leffingwell (Note: Senator William E. Leffingwell of Clinton County was chosen to be the fifth President of the Iowa Senate. He served during the fourth Iowa General Assembly, succeeding Senator Enos Lowe in that leadership position.)
Democratic
Elected President of the Iowa Senate
Maturin L. Fisher (Note: Senator Maturin L. Fisher of Clayton County was chosen to be the sixth President of the Iowa Senate. He served during the fifth Iowa General Assembly, succeeding Senator William E. Leffingwell in that leadership position.)
Democratic

In the 1854 Iowa State Senate elections, Iowa voters elected state senators to serve in the fifth Iowa General Assembly. Elections were held for 19 of the state senate's 31 seats. (Note: At the time, the Iowa Senate had several multi-member districts.) State senators serve four-year terms in the Iowa State Senate.

The general election took place in 1854.

Following the previous election in 1852, Democrats had control of the Iowa Senate with 20 seats to Whigs' 11 seats.

To claim control of the chamber from Democrats, the Whigs needed to net 5 Senate seats.

Democrats maintained control of the Iowa State Senate following the 1854 general election with the balance of power shifting to Democrats holding 17 seats and Whigs having 14 seats (a net gain of 3 seats for Whigs). Democratic Senator Maturin L. Fisher was chosen as the President of the Iowa Senate for the fifth General Assembly, succeeding Democratic Senator William E. Leffingwell in that leadership position.

== Summary of Results ==
- Note: The holdover Senators not up for re-election are not listed on this table.

Senate District	Incumbent	Party	Elected Senator	Party	Outcome
1st (Note: The first district was a 3-member district at the time.)	Salmon Cowles	Dem	Exum Sumner McCulloch	Dem	Dem Hold
1st	James M. Love (Note: Senator Love was a holdover senator not up for re-election. However, on July 1, 1856, during the next term, he resigned, causing a vacancy in this seat that was filled by special election.)	Dem	David Trowbridge Brigham	Dem	Dem Hold
1st	Vacancy upon Senator Love's resignation.		David Trowbridge Brigham	Dem	Dem Hold
1st	Calvin J. Price	Dem	William A. Thurston	Dem	Dem Hold
2nd (Note: The second district was a 2-member district at the time. However, only one of the seats in the district was contested in the election. The other was held by a holdover senator not up for re-election.)	George Hepner	Dem	William Findlay Coolbaugh	Dem	Dem Hold
3rd (Note: The third district was a 2-member district at the time. However, only one of the seats in the district was contested in the election. The other was held by a holdover senator not up for re-election.)	John Brice Spees	Whig	Abner Harrison McCrary	Whig	Whig Hold
5th (Note: The fifth district was a 1-member district at the time.)	Archibald McKinney	Whig	Alvin Saunders	Whig	Whig Hold
6th (Note: The sixth district was a 1-member district at the time.)	John Wesley Hedrick	Whig	James C. Ramsey	Dem	Dem Gain
7th (Note: The seventh district was a 1-member district at the time.)	Henry Benham Hendershott	Dem	Daniel A. Anderson	Whig	Whig Gain
9th (Note: The ninth district was a 1-member district at the time.)	Amos Harris	Dem	Nathan Udell	Dem	Dem Hold
10th (Note: The tenth district was a 1-member district at the time.)	Hadley Douglas Johnson	Dem	James D. Test	Dem	Dem Hold
12th (Note: The twelfth district was a 1-member district at the time.)	Norman Everson	Whig	Hiram Thomas Cleaver	Dem	Dem Gain
13th (Note: The thirteenth district was a 1-member district at the time.)	Joseph Lowe	Dem	James Latimer Hogin	Whig	Whig Gain
16th (Note: The sixteenth district was a 1-member district at the time.)	Eli Snow Wing	Dem	Ambrose Cowperthwaite Fulton	Whig	Whig Gain
17th (Note: The seventeenth district was a 1-member district at the time.)	Jonathan Emerson Fletcher	Dem	George W. Wilkinson	Whig	Whig Gain
18th (Note: The eighteenth district was a 1-member district at the time.)	William E. Leffingwell	Dem	Julius J. Matthews	Whig	Whig Gain
19th (Note: The nineteenth district was a 1-member district at the time.)	George D. Crosthwait	Whig	Samuel Workman	Dem	Dem Gain
20th (Note: The twentieth district was a 1-member district at the time.)	Andrew Young Hull	Dem	Theophilus Bryan (Note: Senator Bryan was originally deemed to be elected to the seat. However, on January 7, 1855, during the next term, he was removed by a vote of the members of the Iowa Senate and replaced by Senator Jordan of the Whig Party.)	Dem	Dem Hold
20th	Andrew Young Hull	Dem	James Cunningham Jordan (Note: Senator Bryan was originally deemed to be elected to the seat. However, on January 7, 1855, during the next term, he was removed by a vote of the members of the Iowa Senate and replaced by Senator Jordan of the Whig Party.)	Whig	Whig Gain
22nd (Note: The twenty-second district was a 1-member district at the time.)	Nathan G. Sales	Dem	Joseph Birge	Dem	Dem Hold
24th (Note: The twenty-fourth district was a 3-member district at the time. Senator Fisher was a holdover incumbent not up for re-election. Senator Shields was a holdover incumbent not up for re-election; however, on June 25, 1856, during the next term, Shields died, causing a vacancy in his seat. Senator Lewis was up for re-election and was succeeded by Senator Hamilton.)	John G. Shields (Note: Senator Shields was a holdover incumbent not up for re-election; however, on June 25, 1856, during the next term, Shields died, causing a vacancy in his seat.)	Dem	Vacancy after Shields' death on June 25, 1856.		
24th	Warner Lewis	Dem	William W. Hamilton	Whig	Whig Gain

== Detailed Results ==
- NOTE: The Iowa General Assembly does not provide detailed vote totals for Iowa State Senate elections in 1854.

== See also ==
- Elections in Iowa
