= 1857 Iowa Senate election =

- 1857

15 out of 36 seats in the Iowa State Senate 19 seats needed for a majority
	Majority party	Minority party	Third party
Party	Republican	Democratic	Know Nothing
Last election	23	12	1
Seats after	22	14	0
Seat change	▼1	▲2	▼1
President of the Iowa Senate before election
William W. Hamilton (Note: Republican Senator William W. Hamilton of Dubuque County was chosen to be the seventh President of the Iowa Senate. He served during the sixth Iowa General Assembly, succeeding Democratic Senator Maturin L. Fisher in that leadership position. Senator Hamilton was the first Republican to serve as President of the Senate (all the previous Senate Presidents had been Democrats). Following Hamilton's one term as President of the Iowa Senate, Article IV, section 18, of the Constitution of Iowa was enacted & established that the Lieutenant Governor of Iowa shall perform the duties of the President of the Senate. The Lieutenant Governor performed the duties of President of the Senate from January 11, 1858 through January 14, 1991. As of 1991, duties of Iowa's Lieutenant Governor no longer include presiding over the state Senate.)
Republican
Elected President of the Iowa Senate
Oran Faville (Note: Article IV, section 18, of the Constitution of Iowa at that time established that the Lieutenant Governor of Iowa shall perform the duties of the President of the Senate. The Lieutenant Governor performed the duties of President of the Senate from January 11, 1858 through January 14, 1991. As of 1991, duties of Iowa's Lieutenant Governor no longer include presiding over the state Senate. As the Lieutenant Governor at the time, Oran Faville was the eighth President of the Iowa Senate. He served during the seventh Iowa General Assembly, succeeding Republican Senator William W. Hamilton in that leadership position.)
Republican

In the 1857 Iowa State Senate elections, Iowa voters elected state senators to serve in the seventh Iowa General Assembly. Elections were held for 15 of the state senate's 36 seats. (Note: At the time, the Iowa Senate had several multi-member districts.) State senators serve four-year terms in the Iowa State Senate.

The general election took place in 1857.

Following the previous election in 1856, Republicans had control of the Iowa Senate with 23 seats to Democrats' 12 seats and one member from the Know Nothing Party.

To claim control of the chamber from Republicans, the Democrats needed to garner seven Senate seats.

Republicans maintained control of the Iowa State Senate following the election with the balance of power shifting to Republicans holding 22 seats and Democrats having 14 seats (a net gain of 2 seats for Democrats).

== Summary of Results ==
- Note: The holdover Senators not up for re-election are not listed on this table.

Senate District	Incumbent	Party	Elected Senator	Party	Outcome
1st (Note: The first district was a 2-member district at the time.)	Exum Sumner McCulloch	Dem	John R. Allen	Dem	Dem Hold
1st	William A. Thurston	Dem	John Walker Rankin	Rep	Rep Gain
3rd (Note: The third district was a 1-member district at the time.)	Abner Harrison McCrary	Rep	Gideon Smith Bailey	Dem	Dem Gain
4th (Note: The fourth was a 2-member district at the time. However, only one of the seats in the district was contested in the election. The other was held by a holdover senator not up for re-election.)	William Findlay Coolbaugh	Dem	William Findlay Coolbaugh	Dem	Dem Hold
7th (Note: The seventh district was a 1-member district at the time.)	Alvin Saunders	Rep	Alvin Saunders	Rep	Rep Hold
8th (Note: The eighth district was a 1-member district at the time.)	James C. Ramsey	Dem	John A. Johnson	Dem	Dem Hold
9th (Note: The ninth district was a 1-member district at the time.)	Daniel A. Anderson	Rep	Daniel A. Anderson	Rep	Rep Hold
12th (Note: The twelfth district was a 1-member district at the time.)	James D. Test	Dem	William H.M. Pusey	Dem	Dem Hold
13th (Note: The thirteenth district was a 1-member district at the time.)	Hiram Thomas Cleaver	Rep	Samuel Reiner	Rep	Rep Hold
15th (Note: The fifteenth district was a 1-member district at the time.)	James Latimer Hogin	Rep	Oliver P. Sherraden	Rep	Rep Hold
19th (Note: The nineteenth district was a 1-member district at the time.)	George W. Wilkinson	Know Nothing	Andrew Oliphant Patterson	Dem	Dem Gain
23rd (Note: The twenty-third district was a 1-member district at the time.)	Julius J. Matthews	Rep	George M. Davis	Rep	Rep Hold
27th (Note: The twenty-seventh district was a 1-member district at the time.)	James Cunningham Jordan	Rep	William P. Davis	Rep	Rep Hold
29th (Note: The twenty-ninth district was a 1-member district at the time.)	Joseph Birge	Dem	Joseph Mann	Dem	Dem Hold
31st (Note: The thirty-first district was a 1-member district at the time.)	William W. Hamilton	Rep	David S. Wilson	Dem	Dem Gain

== Detailed Results ==
- NOTE: The Iowa General Assembly does not provide detailed vote totals for Iowa State Senate elections in 1857.

== See also ==
- Elections in Iowa
