= 1856 Iowa Senate election =

- 1856

21 out of 36 seats in the Iowa State Senate 19 seats needed for a majority
	Majority party	Minority party	Third party
Party	Republican	Democratic	Know Nothing
Last election	0	17	0
Seats before	0	15 (Note: Following the 1854 Iowa Senate election, Democrats held 17 seats to Whigs' 14. However, three changes occurred during the fifth general assembly. In the first district, Democratic Senator James M. Love resigned on July 1, 1856, causing a vacancy in his seat that was filled by special election. Democrat David Trowbridge Brigham succeeded Senator Love, holding the seat for the Democrats. In the twentieth district, Democratic Senator Theophilus Bryan was originally declared the winner. However, the members of the Iowa Senate voted on January 7, 1855 to remove Senator Bryan and replace him with his Whig opponent, Senator James Cunningham Jordan, thereby flipping the seat to Whig control. In the twenty-fourth district, Democratic Senator John G. Shields died on June 25, 1856, causing a vacancy in his seat. Therefore, by election day in 1856, the Democrats held 15 seats, the Whigs held 15 seats, and one seat was vacant (the seat that had been held by Democratic Senator John Shields).)	0
Seats after	23 (Note: The Iowa Senate expanded from 31 seats to 36 seats following the 1856 general election.)	12	1
Seat change	▲23 (Note: Nearly all Whigs switched political party to become Republicans.)	▼3	▲1
	Fourth party
Party	Whig
Last election	14
Seats before	15
Seats after	0
Seat change	▼15
President of the Iowa Senate before election
Maturin L. Fisher (Note: Senator Maturin L. Fisher of Clayton County was chosen to be the sixth President of the Iowa Senate. He served during the fifth Iowa General Assembly, succeeding Senator William E. Leffingwell in that leadership position.)
Democratic
Elected President of the Iowa Senate
William W. Hamilton (Note: Republican Senator William W. Hamilton of Dubuque County was chosen to be the seventh President of the Iowa Senate. He served during the sixth Iowa General Assembly, succeeding Democratic Senator Maturin L. Fisher in that leadership position. Senator Hamilton was the first Republican to serve as President of the Senate (all the previous Senate Presidents had been Democrats). Following Hamilton's one term as President of the Iowa Senate, Article IV, section 18, of the Constitution of Iowa was enacted & established that the Lieutenant Governor of Iowa shall perform the duties of the President of the Senate. The Lieutenant Governor performed the duties of President of the Senate from January 11, 1858 through January 14, 1991. As of 1991, duties of Iowa's Lieutenant Governor no longer include presiding over the state Senate.)
Republican

In the 1856 Iowa State Senate elections, Iowa voters elected state senators to serve in the sixth Iowa General Assembly. Following the expansion of the Iowa Senate from 31 to 36 seats in 1856, elections were held for 21 of the state senate's 36 seats. (Note: At the time, the Iowa Senate had several multi-member districts.) State senators serve four-year terms in the Iowa State Senate.

The general election took place in 1856.

Following the previous election in 1854, Democrats had control of the Iowa Senate with 17 seats to Whigs' 14 seats. However, three changes occurred during the fifth general assembly. In the first district, Democratic Senator James M. Love resigned on July 1, 1856, causing a vacancy in his seat that was filled by special election. Democrat David Trowbridge Brigham succeeded Senator Love, holding the seat for the Democrats. In the twentieth district, Democratic Senator Theophilus Bryan was originally declared the winner. However, the members of the Iowa Senate voted on January 7, 1855, to remove Senator Bryan and replace him with his Whig opponent, Senator James Cunningham Jordan, thereby flipping the seat to Whig control. In the twenty-fourth district, Democratic Senator John G. Shields died on June 25, 1856, causing a vacancy in his seat. Therefore, by election day in 1856, the Democrats held 15 seats, the Whigs held 15 seats, and one seat was vacant (the seat that had been held by Democratic Senator John Shields).

Prior to the 1856 election, nearly all Whigs switched political party affiliation to become Republicans.

To claim control of the chamber from Democrats, the Republicans needed to garner 19 Senate seats.

Republicans claimed control of the Iowa State Senate following the 1856 general election with the balance of power shifting to Republicans holding 23 seats, Democrats having 12 seats, and a lone seat for the Know Nothing Party (Note: Senator George W. Wilkinson was a holdover incumbent senator not up for re-election. Nonetheless, he switched political parties from Whig to Know Nothing.) (a net gain of 23 seats for Republicans and 1 seat for Know Nothings). This was the first time Democrats lost control of the chamber. Republican Senator William W. Hamilton was chosen as the President of the Iowa Senate for the sixth General Assembly, succeeding Democratic Senator Maturin L. Fisher in that leadership position.

The 1856 general election was the first in which the Iowa Senate's districts expanded to cover all the land area currently recognized as Iowa.

== Summary of Results ==
- Note: The holdover Senators not up for re-election are not listed on this table.

Senate District	Incumbent	Party	Elected Senator	Party	Outcome
2nd (Note: The second district transitioned from a 2- to 1-member district.)	Milton D. Browning (Note: Senator Browning was redistricted from district 2 to 4.)	Whig	David Trowbridge Brigham (Note: Democrat David Trowbridge Brigham succeeded Senator James M. Love to fill the remainder of an unexpired term. As an incumbent, Brigham was redistricted from district 1 to 2. The first district transitioned from a 3- to 2-member district, and the other two senators in the first district were holdover senators not up for re-election. Brigham was elected to a full term in 1856 to represent the second district.)	Dem	Dem Gain
2nd	William F. Coolbaugh (Note: Senator Coolbaugh was an incumbent holdover senator not up for re-election. Instead, he was redistricted from district 2 to 4.)	Dem	Obsolete subdistrict		
4th (Note: The fourth district was a 2-member district at the time.)	William Greyer Coop (Note: Senator Coop was redistricted from district 4 to 6.)	Dem	William F. Coolbaugh	Dem	Dem Hold
4th	John Park	Whig	Lyman Cook	Rep	Rep Gain
5th (Note: The fifth district was a 1-member district at the time.)	Alvin Saunders (Note: Senator Alvin Saunders was an incumbent holdover senator not up for re-election. Instead, he was redistricted from district 5 to 7. He switched parties from Whig to Republican.)	Whig	Henry Hoffman Trimble	Dem	Dem Gain
6th (Note: The sixth district was a 1-member district at the time.)	James C. Ramsey (Note: Senator Ramsey was an incumbent holdover senator not up for re-election. Instead, he was redistricted from district 6 to 8.)	Dem	William M. Reed	Rep	Rep Gain
7th (Note: The seventh district was a 1-member district at the time.)	Daniel A. Anderson (Note: Senator Anderson was an incumbent holdover senator not up for re-election. Instead, he was redistricted from district 7 to 9. He switched parties from Whig to Republican.)	Whig	Alvin Saunders	Rep	Rep Gain
8th (Note: The eighth district was a 1-member district at the time.)	Samuel Goslee McAchran (Note: Senator McAchran was redistricted from district 8 to 5.)	Whig	James C. Ramsey	Dem	Dem Gain
9th (Note: The ninth district was a 1-member district at the time.)	Nathan Udell (Note: Senator Udell was redistricted from district 9 to 10.)	Dem	Daniel A. Anderson	Rep	Rep Gain
10th (Note: The tenth district was a 1-member district at the time.)	James D. Test (Note: Senator Test was an incumbent holdover senator not up for re-election. Instead, he was redistricted from district 10 to 12.)	Dem	John Wesley Warner	Dem	Dem Hold
11th (Note: The eleventh district was a 1-member district at the time.)	George Washington Lucas	Dem	Samuel Dale	Dem	Dem Hold
12th (Note: The twelfth district was a 1-member district at the time.)	Hiram Thomas Cleaver (Note: Senator Cleaver was an incumbent holdover senator not up for re-election. Instead, he was redistricted from district 12 to 13. He switched parties from Democrat to Republican.)	Dem	James D. Test	Dem	Dem Hold
13th (Note: The thirteenth district was a 1-member district at the time.)	James Latimer Hogin (Note: Senator Hogin was an incumbent holdover senator not up for re-election. Instead, he was redistricted from district 13 to 15. He switched parties from Whig to Republican.)	Whig	Hiram Thomas Cleaver	Rep	Rep Gain
14th (Note: The fourteenth district was a 1-member district at the time.)	John R. Needham (Note: Senator John R. Needham was redistricted from district 14 to 16.)	Whig	Charles Foster	Rep	Rep Gain
15th (Note: The fifteenth district was a 1-member district at the time.)	Jefferson David Hillis (Note: Senator Hillis was redistricted from district 15 to 17.)	Whig	James Latimer Hogin	Rep	Rep Gain
16th (Note: The sixteenth district was a 1-member district at the time.)	Ambrose Cowperthwaite Fulton (Note: Senator Fulton was redistricted from district 16 to 21.)	Whig	William A. Loughridge	Rep	Rep Gain
17th (Note: The seventeenth district was a 1-member district at the time.)	George W. Wilkinson (Note: Senator Wilkinson was an incumbent holdover senator not up for re-election. Instead, he was redistricted from district 17 to 19. He switched parties from Whig to Know Nothing.)	Whig	Jairus Edward Neal	Dem	Dem Gain
18th (Note: The eighteenth district was a 1-member district at the time.)	Julius J. Matthews (Note: Senator Matthews was an incumbent holdover senator not up for re-election. Instead, he was redistricted from district 18 to 23. He switched parties from Whig to Republican.)	Whig	Marquis Lafayette McPherson	Rep	Rep Gain
19th (Note: The nineteenth district was a 1-member district at the time.)	Samuel Workman (Note: Senator Workman was redistricted from district 19 to 20.)	Dem	George W. Wilkinson	Know Nothing	Know Nothing Gain
20th (Note: The twentieth district was a 1-member district at the time.)	Theophilus Bryan (Note: Senator Bryan was originally deemed to be elected to the seat. However, on January 7, 1855, he was removed by a vote of the members of the Iowa Senate and replaced by Senator Jordan of the Whig Party.)	Dem	Samuel Jordan Kirkwood	Rep	Rep Gain
20th	James Cunningham Jordan (Note: Senator Bryan was originally deemed to be elected to the seat. However, on January 7, 1855, he was removed by a vote of the members of the Iowa Senate and replaced by Senator Jordan of the Whig Party.) (Note: Senator Jordan was an incumbent holdover senator not up for re-election. Instead, he was redistricted from district 20 to 27. He switched parties from Whig to Republican.)	Whig	Samuel Jordan Kirkwood	Rep	Rep Gain
21st (Note: The twenty-first district was a 1-member district at the time.)	Elisha F. Clark (Note: Senator Clark was redistricted from district 21 to 28/29.)	Dem	Nicholas John Rusch	Rep	Rep Gain
22nd (Note: The twenty-second district was a 1-member district at the time.)	Joseph Birge (Note: Senator Birge was an incumbent holdover senator not up for re-election. Instead, he was redistricted from district 22 to 29.)	Dem	Jonathan Wright Cattell	Rep	Rep Gain
23rd (Note: The twenty-third district was a 1-member district at the time.)	Isaac Mosher Preston (Note: Senator Preston was redistricted from district 23 to 24/25.)	Dem	Julius J. Matthews	Rep	Rep Gain
24th (Note: The twenty-fourth district transitioned from a 3- to 1-member district. Senator Fisher was redistricted from district 24 to 32. Senator Shields died on June 25, 1856, causing a vacancy in his seat. Senator Hamilton was an incumbent holdover senator not up for re-election. Instead, he was redistricted from district 24 to 31. He switched parties from Whig to Republican.)	Maturin L. Fisher (Note: Senator Fisher was redistricted from district 24 to 32.)	Dem	William George Thompson	Rep	Rep Gain
24th	John G. Shields (Note: Senator Shields died on June 25, 1856, causing a vacancy in his seat.)	Dem	William George Thompson	Rep	Rep Gain
24th	William W. Hamilton (Note: Senator Hamilton was an incumbent holdover senator not up for re-election. Instead, he was redistricted from district 24 to 31. He switched parties from Whig to Republican.)	Whig	William George Thompson	Rep	Rep Gain
25th (Note: The twenty-fifth district was a newly created 1-member district.)	Newly created district		George McCoy	Rep	Rep Gain
26th (Note: The twenty-sixth district was a newly created 1-member district.)	Newly created district		Josiah Bushnell Grinnell	Rep	Rep Gain
27th (Note: The twenty-seventh district was a newly created 1-member district.)	Newly created district		James Cunningham Jordan	Rep	Rep Gain
28th (Note: The twenty-eighth district was a newly created 1-member district.)	Newly created district		Jeremiah W. Jenkins	Rep	Rep Gain
29th (Note: The twenty-ninth district was a newly created 1-member district.)	Newly created district		Joseph Birge	Dem	Dem Gain
30th (Note: The thirtieth district was a newly created 1-member district.)	Newly created district		William G. Stewart	Dem	Dem Gain
31st (Note: The thirty-first district was a newly created 1-member district.)	Newly created district		William W. Hamilton	Rep	Rep Gain
32nd (Note: The thirty-second district was a newly created 1-member district.)	Newly created district		Henry B. Carter	Rep	Rep Gain
33rd (Note: The thirty-third district was a newly created 1-member district.)	Newly created district		Aaron Brown	Rep	Rep Gain
34th (Note: The thirty-fourth district was a newly created 1-member district.)	Newly created district		Jeremiah T. Atkins	Rep	Rep Gain

== Detailed Results ==
- NOTE: The Iowa General Assembly does not provide detailed vote totals for Iowa State Senate elections in 1856.

== See also ==
- Elections in Iowa
