= 1852 Iowa Senate election =

- 1852

22 out of 31 seats in the Iowa State Senate 16 seats needed for a majority
	Majority party	Minority party
Party	Democratic	Whig
Last election	14	5
Seats after	20 (Note: The Iowa Senate expanded from 19 seats to 31 seats following the 1852 general election.)	11
Seat change	▲6	▲6
President of the Iowa Senate before election
Enos Lowe (Note: Senator Enos Lowe of Des Moines County was chosen to be the fourth President of the Iowa Senate. He served during the third Iowa General Assembly, succeeding Senator John Jackson Selman in that leadership position.)
Democratic
Elected President of the Iowa Senate
William E. Leffingwell (Note: Senator William E. Leffingwell of Clinton County was chosen to be the fifth President of the Iowa Senate. He served during the fourth Iowa General Assembly, succeeding Senator Enos Lowe in that leadership position.)
Democratic

In the 1852 Iowa State Senate elections, Iowa voters elected state senators to serve in the fourth Iowa General Assembly. Following the expansion of the Iowa Senate from 19 to 31 seats in 1852, elections were held for 22 of the state senate's 31 seats. (Note: At the time, the Iowa Senate had several multi-member districts.) State senators serve four-year terms in the Iowa State Senate.

The general election took place in 1852.

Following the previous election in 1850, Democrats had control of the Iowa Senate with 14 seats to Whigs' five seats.

To claim control of the chamber from Democrats, the Whigs needed to net 11 Senate seats.

Democrats maintained control of the Iowa State Senate following the 1852 general election with the balance of power shifting to Democrats holding 20 seats and Whigs having 11 seats (a net gain of 6 seats for both Democrats and Whigs). Democratic Senator William E. Leffingwell was chosen as the President of the Iowa Senate for the fourth General Assembly, succeeding Democratic Senator Enos Lowe in that leadership position.

== Summary of Results ==
Senate District	Incumbent	Party	Elected Senator	Party	Outcome
1st (Note: The first district transitioned from a 2- to 3-member district. Senator Baker resigned, causing a vacancy filled by special election. Senator Espy was up for a regularly-scheduled re-election to a four-year term. The third seat from the first district was newly created.)	Nathan Baker (Note: In 1851, Senator Baker resigned, causing a vacancy in this seat that was filled by special election.)	Dem	Salmon Cowles (Note: Election was held to fill a vacancy.)	Dem	Dem Hold
1st	Thomas Stevenson Espy	Dem	James M. Love	Dem	Dem Hold
1st	Newly created subdistrict		Calvin J. Price	Dem	Dem Gain
2nd (Note: The second district was a 2-member district at the time.)	John Brice Spees (Note: Senator Spees was an incumbent holdover senator not up for re-election. Instead, he was redistricted from district 2 to 3.)	Whig	George Hepner (Note: Senator Hepner was an incumbent holdover senator not up for re-election. Instead, he was redistricted from district 6 to 2.)	Dem	Dem Gain
2nd	George Grover Wright	Whig	Milton D. Browning	Whig	Whig Hold
3rd (Note: The third district transitioned from a 1- to 2-member district.)	John Jackson Selman	Dem	George Schramm	Whig	Whig Gain
3rd	Newly created subdistrict		John Brice Spees	Whig	Whig Gain
4th (Note: The fourth district transitioned from a 1- to 2-member district.)	Henry Benham Hendershott (Note: Senator Hendershott was an incumbent holdover senator not up for re-election. Instead, he was redistricted from district 4 to 7.)	Dem	William Greyer Coop	Dem	Dem Hold
4th	Newly created subdistrict		John Park	Whig	Whig Gain
5th (Note: The fifth district was a 1-member district at the time.)	Phineas M. Casady	Dem	Archibald McKinney	Whig	Whig Gain
6th (Note: The sixth district transitioned from a 2- to 1-member district.)	Enos Lowe (Note: Senator Lowe resigned, causing a vacancy in this seat that was filled by special election.)	Dem	John Wesley Hedrick	Whig	Whig Gain
6th	George Hepner	Dem	Obsolete subdistrict		
7th (Note: The seventh district was a 1-member district at the time.)	John Tillison Morton (Note: Senator Morton resigned, causing a vacancy in this seat that was filled by special election.)	Whig	Henry Benham Hendershott	Dem	Dem Gain
8th (Note: The eighth district was a 1-member district at the time.)	John Howell	Dem	Samuel Goslee McAchran	Whig	Whig Gain
9th (Note: The ninth district was a 1-member district at the time.)	Norman Everson (Note: Senator Everson was an incumbent holdover senator not up for re-election. Instead, he was redistricted from district 9 to 12.)	Whig	Amos Harris	Dem	Dem Gain
10th (Note: The tenth district was a 1-member district at the time.)	Joseph Lowe (Note: Senator Lowe was an incumbent holdover senator not up for re-election. Instead, he was redistricted from district 10 to 13.)	Dem	Hadley Douglas Johnson	Dem	Dem Hold
11th (Note: The eleventh district was a 1-member district at the time.)	Freeman Alger	Dem	George Washington Lucas	Dem	Dem Hold
12th (Note: The twelfth district was a 1-member district at the time.)	William E. Leffingwell (Note: Senator Leffingwell was an incumbent holdover senator not up for re-election. Instead, he was redistricted from district 12 to 18.)	Dem	Norman Everson	Whig	Whig Gain
13th (Note: The thirteenth district was a 1-member district at the time.)	John Parsons Cook	Whig	Joseph Lowe	Dem	Dem Gain
14th (Note: The fourteenth district was a 1-member district at the time.)	Nathan G. Sales (Note: Senator Sales was an incumbent holdover senator not up for re-election. Instead, he was redistricted from district 14 to 22.)	Dem	John R. Needham	Whig	Whig Gain
15th (Note: The fifteenth district transitioned from a 2- to 1-member district.)	John G. Shields (Note: Senator Shields was an incumbent senator; however, he was up for re-election. He was redistricted from district 15 to 24.)	Dem	Jefferson David Hillis	Whig	Whig Gain
15th	Warner Lewis (Note: Senator Lewis was an incumbent holdover senator not up for re-election. Instead, he was redistricted from district 15 to 24.)	Dem	Obsolete subdistrict		
16th (Note: The sixteenth district was a newly created 1-member district.)	Newly created district		Eli Snow Wing	Dem	Dem Gain
17th (Note: The seventeenth district was a newly created 1-member district.)	Newly created district		Jonathan Emerson Fletcher	Dem	Dem Gain
18th (Note: The eighteenth district was a newly created 1-member district.)	Newly created district		William E. Leffingwell	Dem	Dem Gain
19th (Note: The nineteenth district was a newly created 1-member district.)	Newly created district		George D. Crosthwait	Whig	Whig Gain
20th (Note: The twentieth district was a newly created 1-member district.)	Newly created district		Andrew Young Hull	Dem	Dem Gain
21st (Note: The twenty-first district was a newly created 1-member district.)	Newly created district		Elisha F. Clark	Dem	Dem Gain
22nd (Note: The twenty-second district was a newly created 1-member district.)	Newly created district		Nathan G. Sales	Dem	Dem Gain
23rd (Note: The twenty-third district was a newly created 1-member district.)	Newly created district		Isaac Mosher Preston	Dem	Dem Gain
24th (Note: The twenty-fourth district was a newly created 3-member district.)	Newly created subdistrict		Warner Lewis	Dem	Dem Gain
24th	Newly created subdistrict		John G. Shields	Dem	Dem Gain
24th	Newly created subdistrict		Maturin L. Fisher	Dem	Dem Gain

== Detailed Results ==
- NOTE: The Iowa General Assembly does not provide detailed vote totals for Iowa State Senate elections in 1852.

== See also ==
- Elections in Iowa
