= Samuel Dale (disambiguation) =

Samuel Dale (1772–1841) was an American frontiersman, general, and member of the Alabama and Mississippi state legislatures.

Samuel Dale may also refer to:

- Samuel Dale (physician) (1659–1739), English naturalist and physician
- Samuel F. Dale (1773–1842), American surveyor, militiaman, judge, and legislator from Pennsylvania
- Samuel F. Dale (1816–1876), son of the above, namesake of the historic Samuel F. Dale House
- Samuel Dale (Iowa politician) (1798–1878), member of the Iowa State Senate (see 1856 Iowa Senate election)

== See also ==
- Dale Samuels, American football quarterback
