= 1850 Iowa Senate election =

- 1850

11 out of 19 seats in the Iowa State Senate 10 seats needed for a majority
	Majority party	Minority party
Party	Democratic	Whig
Last election	11	8
Seats after	14	5
Seat change	▲3	▼3
President of the Iowa Senate before election
John Jackson Selman (Note: Senator John Jackson Selman of Davis County was chosen to be the third President of the Iowa Senate. He served during the second Iowa General Assembly, succeeding Senator Thomas Hughes in that leadership position.)
Democratic
Elected President of the Iowa Senate
Enos Lowe (Note: Senator Enos Lowe of Des Moines County was chosen to be the fourth President of the Iowa Senate. He served during the third Iowa General Assembly, succeeding Senator John Jackson Selman in that leadership position.)
Democratic

In the 1850 Iowa State Senate elections, Iowa voters elected state senators to serve in the third Iowa General Assembly. Elections were held for 11 of the state senate's 19 seats. (Note: At the time, the Iowa Senate had several multi-member districts.) State senators serve four-year terms in the Iowa State Senate.

The general election took place in 1850.

Following the previous election in 1848, Democrats had control of the Iowa Senate with 11 seats to Whigs' eight seats.

To claim control of the chamber from Democrats, the Whigs needed to net two Senate seats.

Democrats maintained control of the Iowa State Senate following the 1850 general election with the balance of power shifting to Democrats holding 14 seats and Whigs having five seats (a net gain of 3 seats for Democrats). Democratic Senator Enos Lowe was chosen as the President of the Iowa Senate for the third General Assembly, succeeding Democratic Senator John Jackson Selman in that leadership position.

== Summary of Results ==
- Note: The holdover Senators not up for re-election are unlisted on this table.

Senate District	Incumbent	Party	Elected Senator	Party	Outcome
1st (Note: The first district was a 2-member district at the time. However, only one of the seats in the district was contested in the election. The other was held by a holdover senator not up for re-election.)	James Sprott	Whig	Nathan Baker (Note: In 1851, Senator Baker resigned, causing a vacancy in this seat that would be filled by special election during the next session.)	Dem	Dem Gain
2nd (Note: The second district was a 2-member district at the time. However, only one of the seats in the district was contested in the election. The other was held by a holdover senator not up for re-election.)	John Fletcher Sanford	Whig	John Brice Spees	Whig	Whig Hold
4th (Note: The fourth district was a 1-member district at the time.) (Note: Election was held to fill a vacancy.)	Barney Royston (Note: In September 1850, Senator Royston died, causing a vacancy in this seat that was filled by special election.)	Dem	Henry Benham Hendershott	Dem	Dem Hold
6th (Note: The sixth district was a 2-member district at the time. Senator Fear resigned, causing a vacancy filled by special election to the remainder of two years in the seat's term. Senator Browning's seat was up for a regularly-scheduled election to a four-year term.)	Alfred S. Fear (Note: Senator Fear resigned, causing a vacancy in this seat that was filled by special election in the 1850 election.)	Dem	Enos Lowe	Dem	Dem Hold
6th	Milton D. Browning	Whig	George Hepner (Note: Senator Hepner was elected to a full four-year term in the 1850 election.)	Dem	Dem Gain
7th (Note: The seventh district was a 1-member district at the time.)	Evan Jay	Whig	John Tillison Morton (Note: During the next term, Senator Morton resigned, causing a vacancy in this seat that would be filled by special election during the next session.)	Whig	Whig Hold
9th (Note: The ninth district was a 1-member district at the time.)	Francis Springer	Whig	Norman Everson	Whig	Whig Hold
10th (Note: The tenth district was a 1-member district at the time.)	Richard Randolph Harbour	Dem	Joseph Lowe	Dem	Dem Hold
12th (Note: The twelfth district was a 1-member district at the time.)	Loring Wheeler	Whig	William E. Leffingwell	Dem	Dem Gain
14th (Note: The fourteenth district was a 1-member district at the time.)	Philip Burr Bradley	Dem	Nathan G. Sales	Dem	Dem Hold
15th (Note: The fifteenth district was a 2-member district at the time. However, only one of the seats in the district was contested in the election. The other was held by a holdover senator not up for re-election.)	Theophilus Crawford	Dem	Warner Lewis	Dem	Dem Hold

== Detailed Results ==
- NOTE: The Iowa General Assembly does not provide detailed vote totals for Iowa State Senate elections in 1850.

== See also ==
- Elections in Iowa
