= List of mayors of Dubuque, Iowa =

The following is a list of mayors of the city of Dubuque, Iowa, United States.

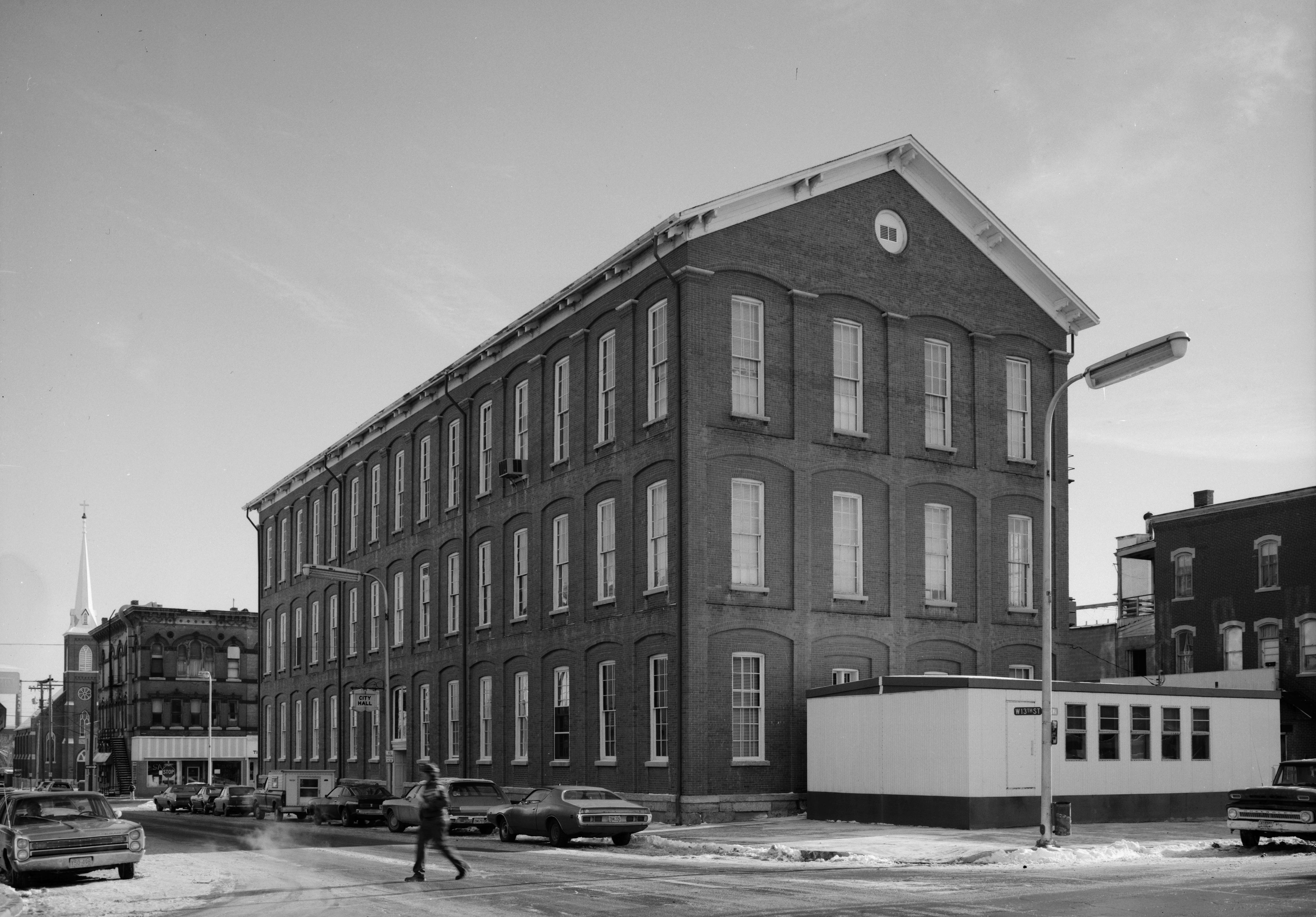
City hall building in Dubuque, Iowa; built in 1857 (photo 1977)

- Caleb H. Booth, 1841
- Samuel D. Dixon, 1842
- James Fanning, 1843
- F. K. O'Ferrall, 1844-1846
- P. A. Lorimier, 1847, 1851
- George L. Nightingale, 1848, 1857
- Warner Lewis, 1849
- J. H. Emerson, 1850
- Jesse P. Farley, 1852-1854
- John G. Shields, 1855
- David S. Wilson, 1856-1857
- Henry S. Hetherington, 1858
- John Hodgdon, 1859
- Henry L. Stout, 1860-1861
- J. H. Thedinga, 1862-1863
- John Thompson, 1864-1866
- J. K. Graves, 1867
- Solomon Turck, 1868, 1872
- W. J. Knight, 1869-1870, 1878
- James Burt, 1871
- A. F. Jaeger, 1872
- A. H. Peaslee, 1873-1874
- James Cushing, 1875
- George B. Burch, 1876-1877, 1888
- John D. Bush, 1879-1880
- John J. Linehan, 1881-1882
- Frederick O'Donnell, 1883-1884
- John Glab, 1885-1886
- C. A. Voelker, 1887
- R. W. Stewart, 1889-1891
- Chas. J. W. Saunders, 1891-1892
- A. W. Daugherty, 1893
- Peter Olinger, 1894-1895
- T. T. Duffy, 1896-1897
- C. H. Berg, 1898-1905
- H.A. Schunk, 1906-1909
- D.J. Haas, 1910-1911
- M.E. Lyons, 1912-1913
- James Saul, c.1914-1918
- James Alderson, 1920-1925
- Harlan Melchior, 1926, 1927
- John H. Maclay, 1928
- M. B. Andelfinger, 1929, 1932
- William H. Meuser, 1930, 1931
- Mark R. Kane, 1933, 1934, 1935
- Frank M. Jaeger, 1936
- John K. Chalmers, 1937
- Carl A. Clark, 1938
- George R. Murphy, 1939, 1943, 1947
- Frank W. Thompson, 1940, 1945
- Frank Van Duelman, 1941, 1948
- Albert Wharton, 1942, 1946, 1949
- Wallace W. Moffatt, 1944
- Clarence P. Welu, 1950, 1956, 1958
- Romolo Russo, 1951
- Ray F. Kolb, 1952
- Ruben V. Austin, 1953
- Leo N. Schueller, 1954
- Charles Kintzinger, 1955, 1959
- Charles E. Dove, 1957
- Peter Joseph Takos, 1960
- John P. Schreiber, 1961
- Louis J. Schaller, 1962
- James Kean, 1963
- Robert J. Horgan, 1964, 1965
- Walter A. Pregler, 1966, 1969
- Richard Ludwig, 1967
- M.S. McCauley, 1968
- Donald R. Meyers, 1970
- Gaylord M. Couchman, 1971
- Wayne Moldenhauer, 1972
- Joseph Bitter, 1973
- Allan Thoms, 1974
- C. Robert Justmann, 1975
- Alvin Emil Lundh, 1976
- Emil “Mike” Stackis, 1977
- Thomas Tully, Jr., 1978
- Richard Wertzberger, 1979
- Carolyn Farrell, 1980
- D. Michael King, 1981
- James Brady, 1982-1994
- Terry Duggan, 1994-2005
- Roy D. Buol, 2005-2021
- Brad M. Cavanagh, 2022-present

== See also ==
- Dubuque City Hall
- History of Dubuque, Iowa
