= 1848 Iowa Senate election =

- 1848

10 out of 19 seats in the Iowa State Senate 10 seats needed for a majority
| | Majority party | Minority party |
|---|---|---|
| Party | Democratic | Whig |
| Last election | 11 | 8 |
| Seats after | 11 | 8 |
| Seat change | Steady | Steady |
President of the Iowa Senate before election
Thomas Baker (Note: Senator Thomas Baker of Polk County was chosen to be the first President of the Iowa Senate. He served during the first Iowa General Assembly.) & Thomas Hughes (Note: Senator Thomas Hughes of Johnson County was chosen to be the second President of the Iowa Senate. He served during the first Iowa General Assembly, succeeding Senator Thomas Baker in that leadership position.)
Democratic
Elected President of the Iowa Senate
John Jackson Selman (Note: Senator John Jackson Selman of Davis County was chosen to be the third President of the Iowa Senate. He served during the second Iowa General Assembly, succeeding Senator Thomas Hughes in that leadership position.)
Democratic

In the 1848 Iowa State Senate elections, Iowa voters elected state senators to serve in the second Iowa General Assembly. Elections were held for 10 of the state senate's 19 seats. (Note: At the time, the Iowa Senate had several multi-member districts.) State senators serve four-year terms in the Iowa State Senate.

The general election took place in 1848.

Following the previous election in 1846, Democrats had control of the Iowa Senate with 11 seats to Whigs' eight seats.

To claim control of the chamber from Democrats, the Whigs needed to net two Senate seats.

Democrats maintained control of the Iowa State Senate following the 1848 general election with the balance of power remaining unchanged with Democrats holding 11 seats and Whigs having eight seats. Democratic Senator John Jackson Selman was chosen as the President of the Iowa Senate for the second General Assembly.

== Summary of Results ==
- Note: The holdover Senators not up for re-election are unlisted on this table.

| Senate District | Incumbent | Party | Elected Senator | Party | Outcome |
|---|---|---|---|---|---|
| 1st (Note: The first district was a 2-member district at the time. However, only one of the seats in the district was contested in the 1848 election. The other was held by a holdover senator not up for re-election until 1850.) | Jacob Huner | Dem | Thomas Stevenson Espy | Dem | Dem Hold |
| 2nd (Note: The second district was a 2-member district at the time. However, only one of the seats in the district was contested in the 1848 election. The other was held by a holdover senator not up for re-election until 1850.) | John McCormick Whitaker | Dem | George Grover Wright | Whig | Whig Gain |
| 3rd (Note: The third district was a 1-member district at the time.) | John Jackson Selman | Dem | John Jackson Selman | Dem | Dem Hold |
| 4th (Note: The fourth district was a 1-member district at the time.) | James Davis | Whig | Barney Royston (Note: In September 1850, Senator Royston died, causing a vacancy in this seat that would be filled by special election during the next session.) | Dem | Dem Gain |
| 5th (Note: The fifth district was a 1-member district at the time.) | Thomas Baker | Dem | Phineas M. Casady | Dem | Dem Hold |
| 6th (Note: The sixth district was a 2-member district at the time. However, only one of the seats in the district was contested in the 1848 election. The other was held by a holdover senator not up for re-election until 1850.) | Samuel Fullenwider | Whig | Alfred S. Fear (Note: During the next session, Senator Fear resigned, causing a vacancy in this seat that would be filled by special election in the 1850 election.) | Dem | Dem Gain |
| 8th (Note: The eighth district was a 1-member district at the time.) | Robert Brown (Note: On January 2, 1848, Senator Brown resigned, causing a vacancy. That vacant seat was filled by Senator John Howell.) | Dem | John Howell (Note: On January 2, 1848, Senator Brown resigned, causing a vacancy. That vacant seat was filled by Senator John Howell. Senator Howell was re-elected to a full term in 1848.) | Dem | Dem Hold |
| 8th | John Howell | Dem | John Howell | Dem | Dem Hold |
| 11th (Note: The eleventh district was a 1-member district at the time.) | Thomas Hughes | Dem | Freeman Alger | Dem | Dem Hold |
| 13th (Note: The Thirteenth district was a 1-member district at the time.) | Samuel Augustus Bissell | Dem | John Parsons Cook | Whig | Whig Gain |
| 15th (Note: The fifteenth district was a 2-member district at the time. However, only one of the seats in the district was contested in the 1848 election. The other was held by a holdover senator not up for re-election until 1850.) | Thomas Hart Benton | Dem | John G. Shields | Dem | Dem Hold |

== Detailed Results ==
- NOTE: The Iowa General Assembly does not provide detailed vote totals for Iowa State Senate elections in 1848.

== See also ==
- Elections in Iowa
