= Governor Sanders =

Governor Sanders may refer to:

- Carl Sanders (1925–2014), 74th Governor of Georgia
- Jared Y. Sanders Sr. (1869–1944), 34th Governor of Louisiana
- Sarah Huckabee Sanders (born 1982), 47th Governor of Arkansas

== See also ==
- Alvin Saunders (1817–1899), 10th Governor of Nebraska Territory
