= Thomas Hart Benton (Iowa politician) =

American educator, military officer, and politician from Iowa (1816–1879)

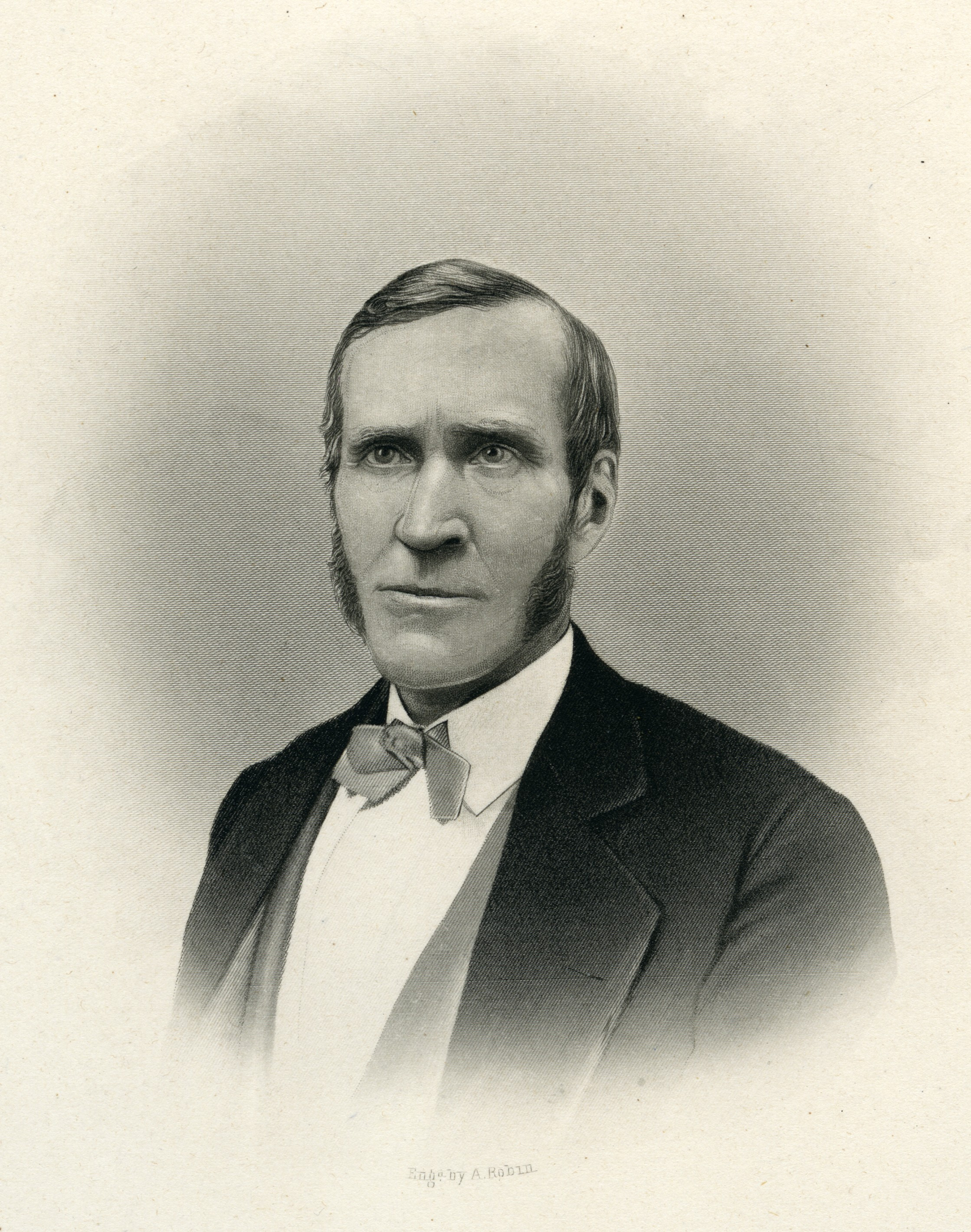

Iowa Superintendent of Public Instruction
- In office 1848–1854

Member of the Iowa Senate from the 15th district
- In office November 30, 1846 – December 3, 1848 Serving with Theophilus Crawford
- Succeeded by: John G. Shields

Personal details
- Born: September 5, 1816 Williamson County, Tennessee
- Died: April 10, 1879 (aged 62) St. Louis, Missouri
- Party: Democratic
- Relatives: Thomas Hart Benton (uncle)
- Education: Marion College

Military service
- Allegiance: United States (Union)
- Branch/service: Union Army
- Rank: Brevet Brigadier-General
- Commands: 29th Iowa Infantry Regiment
- Battles/wars: American Civil War; Battle of Bayou Fourche; Camden Expedition; Mobile campaign

Thomas Hart Benton (September 5, 1816 – April 10, 1879) was an American politician.

Born on September 5, 1816, in Williamson County, Tennessee, Thomas Hart Benton was named after his uncle, who served in the Tennessee Senate, and represented Missouri in the United States Senate and House of Representatives. The younger T. H. Benton attended Huntington Academy and Marion College in Missouri. In 1839, Benton moved to Dubuque, Iowa, and found work as a teacher. After ending his teaching career, he became a merchant.

Politically, Benton was affiliated with the Democratic Party. He was elected to the Iowa Senate from District 15, and served as a member of the First Iowa General Assembly from November 30, 1846, to December 3, 1848. He stepped down from the state senate to serve six years as Iowa's first Superintendent of Public Instruction. At the time, that office was held concurrently with the position of secretary of the Iowa Board of Regents.

Later, Benton moved to Council Bluffs. As the American Civil War broke out, Governor Samuel J. Kirkwood granted Benton the military rank of colonel and tasked him with organizing the 29th Iowa Infantry Regiment. Following the Battle of Bayou Fourche, the 29th Iowa, under Benton's command, protected the home of Confederate general Albert Pike. Benton completed this task because both he and Pike were Freemasons. Benton was elevated to the rank of brevet brigadier-general and returned to Iowa after the war ended. Benton contested the 1865 Iowa gubernatorial election as a Democratic candidate opposed to African-American suffrage, and lost to Republican incumbent William M. Stone. After Andrew Johnson assumed the presidency following the assassination of Abraham Lincoln, the Republican Assessor of Internal Revenue was removed from office, and Benton took on the position. Benton died in St. Louis, Missouri, on April 10, 1879.
