= John Hodgdon =

American politician

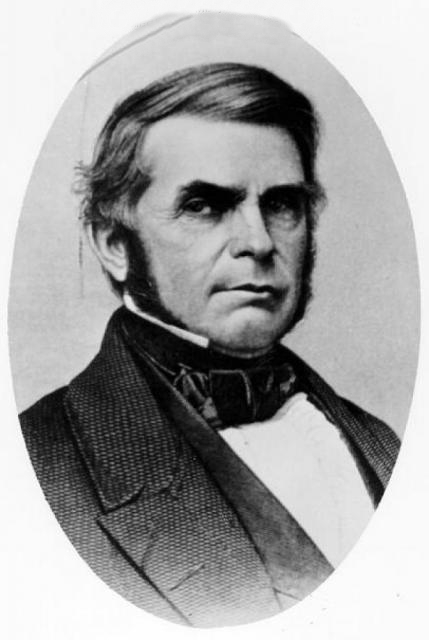

Personal details
- Born: October 1800
- Died: August 27, 1883 (aged 82)

John Hodgdon (October 1800 – August 27, 1883) was an American politician and farmer. The Hodgdon family were primarily farmers; his grandfather owned a significant tract of land in then disputed Aroostook County. John Hodgdon's grandfather died in 1819 and left his grandson the land, which eventually became the town of Hodgdon. His inheritance helped him attend Phillips Exeter Academy and Bowdoin College, from which he graduated in 1827. After Bowdoin, he moved to Bangor, Maine to study law under prominent area lawyer Allen Gilman. In 1833, he was a member of the Executive Council of Maine and from 1834 to 1838 he was a Land Agent for the state.

In 1846, he was elected to the Maine State Senate and served as Senate President in 1847. He was re-elected in 1848 but resigned after unsuccessfully challenging incumbent Democrat John W. Dana his party's nomination for governor. In 1849, Hodgdon was named Bank Commissioner and in 1853, he was offered the position of US consul in Rome by President Franklin Pierce, which he declined.

In 1853, he left Maine for Dubuque, Iowa, where he became mayor in 1859.

== See also ==
- List of mayors of Dubuque, Iowa
