= Roy D. Buol =

American politician

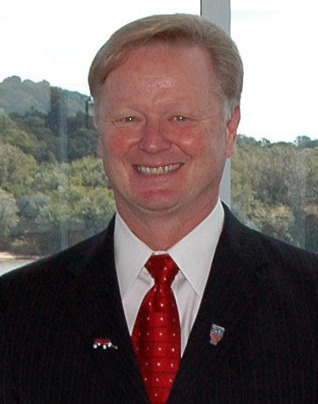
- Buol in 2007

Mayor of Dubuque, Iowa
- In office 2005–2021
- Succeeded by: Brad Cavanagh

City Counsel Representative for Second Ward
- In office 1995–2005

Personal details
- Born: Dubuque, Iowa
- Party: Democratic

Roy D. Buol served as mayor of Dubuque, Iowa from 2005 to 2021. Buol graduated from the University of Dubuque after attending Wachusett Regional High School in Holden, Massachusetts. A native of Dubuque, Buol served as the Second Ward's city council representative from 1995 to 2005. In 2005, he was elected mayor. He was reelected in 2009, 2013, and 2017, retiring December 31, 2021, as the longest-serving Mayor in Dubuque history.

== Earlier career ==
Buol worked at John Deere Dubuque Works for over 30 years until his retirement. In 2002, he accepted a position as building and grounds director at the University of Dubuque.

== Elected office ==
In 1995, Buol was elected as a city councilman of Dubuque. He served for ten years, until his election as mayor in 2005.

Running for mayor, Buol espoused a vision of making Dubuque one of the most environmentally sustainable cities in the U.S. Buol's vision is one of the main reasons that IBM chose Dubuque as a test city for its "Insights in Motion" program. Mayor Buol established an annual "Growing Sustainable Communities" Conference in Dubuque. In 2013, Dubuque won the U.S. Environmental Protection Agency's annual National Award for Smart Growth Achievement. Through Buol’s work with America’s River Project, the Port of Dubuque has been developed with nearly $400 million for educational, entertainment, and riverfront projects, including the Mississippi Riverwalk, the River's Edge Plaza, and the Alliant Energy Amphitheater. He was also a supporter of the Bee Branch Restoration Project.

== Awards ==
- 2014 Public Leadership in the Arts Award for Local Arts Leadership for cities with a population of less than 100,000.

== See also ==
- List of mayors of Dubuque, Iowa
