= 1865 Iowa gubernatorial election =

- October 10, 1865
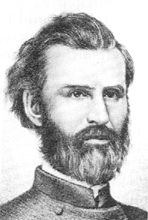

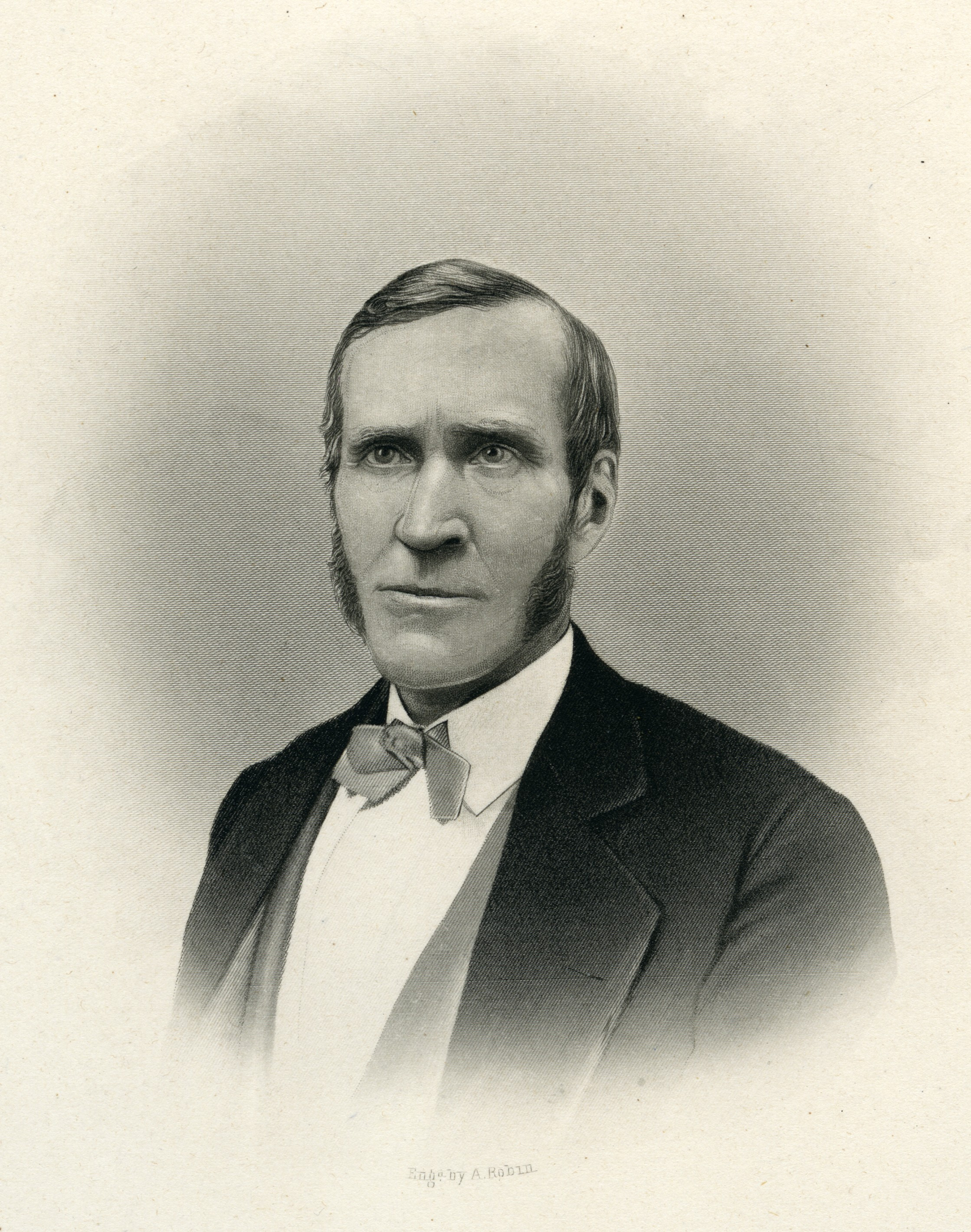
Nominee	William M. Stone	Thomas H. Benton
Party	Republican	Democratic
Popular vote	70,461	54,090
Percentage	56.41%	43.31%
- County results Stone: 50–60% 60–70% 70–80% 80–90% 90–100% Benton: 50–60% 60–70% 70–80% 80–90% No Data/Votes
Governor before election
William M. Stone
Republican
Elected Governor
William M. Stone
Republican

The 1865 Iowa gubernatorial election was held on October 10, 1865, in order to elect the governor of Iowa. Incumbent Republican governor William M. Stone was re-elected against Democratic nominee Thomas H. Benton.

== General election ==
On election day, October 10, 1865, incumbent Republican governor William M. Stone won re-election by a margin of 16,371 votes against his opponent Democratic nominee Thomas H. Benton, thereby holding Republican control over the office of governor. Stone was sworn in for his second term on January 16, 1866.

=== Results ===
Iowa gubernatorial election, 1865
Party	Candidate	Votes	%
Republican	William M. Stone (incumbent)	70,461	56.41
Democratic	Thomas H. Benton	54,090	43.31
	Scattering	353	0.28
Total votes		124,904	100.00
Republican hold			
