= Samuel F. Dale =

American surveyor, militia member, judge and legislator

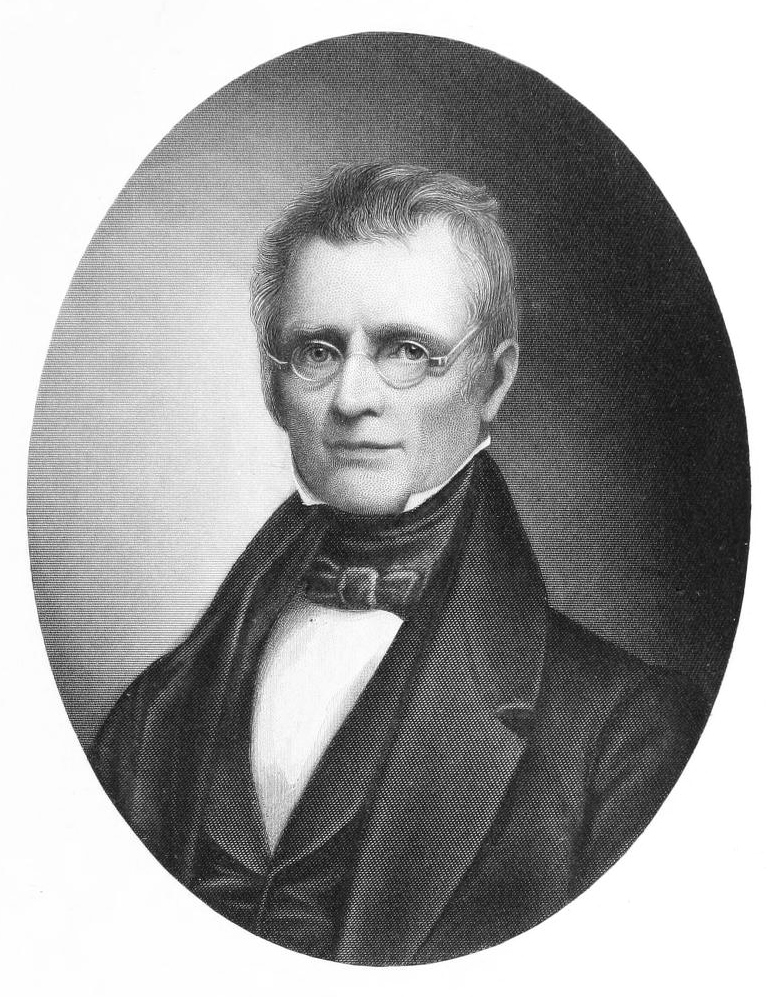

Member of the Pennsylvania House of Representatives
- In office 1807–1813

Personal details
- Born: Samuel Futhey Dale; July 15, 1773 West Fallowfield Township, Chester County, Province of Pennsylvania
- Died: September 1, 1842 (aged 69) Lancaster, Pennsylvania, U.S.
- Spouse: Eliza Gundaker (m. 1812)
- Children: 16
- Parent: Samuel Dale (father)
- Occupation: Politician; surveyor; judge

Samuel Futhey Dale (July 15, 1773 – September 1, 1842) was an American surveyor, militia member, judge, and legislator from Pennsylvania.

== Formative years and family ==
Born in West Fallowfield Township, Chester County, Pennsylvania, on July 15, 1773, Samuel F. Dale was the second of nine children of Ann (née Futhey) and Samuel Dale. His father was a state senator and representative.

In 1812, Dale married Eliza Gundaker. They became the parents of sixteen children, including judge Michael G. Dale and industrialist Samuel Futhey Dale, owner of the Samuel F. Dale House.

== Military service ==
Elected as colonel of the 132d Regiment of the 1st Brigade and 14th Division (subsequently the 16th) in 1802, he led the regiment under commission from Governor Simon Snyder during the War of 1812.

== Career ==
Dale was appointed deputy surveyor of Venango, Warren and Clarion counties in 1801, dividing them into thousand-acre tracts.

From 1807 to 1813, he was Representative of Venango and Mercer counties in the Pennsylvania State Legislature. Dale also subdivided the greater part of the Holland Land Company property, later known as the Lancaster Land Company property, in Crawford, Erie, Venango, Warren, and what are now Clarion and Forest counties. Much of this surveying was done through almost impenetrable virgin forest.

In 1813, he moved to Lancaster, where he filled many important public offices. In 1818, he was appointed alderman of Lancaster by Governor William Findlay. In 1819, he was appointed by Governor Snyder as associate judge of Lancaster County and, owing to the illness of the presiding judge, performed the duties of judge until his death.

== Personal life ==
Dale died on September 1, 1842, at his home in Centre Square in Lancaster.
