= John Chrisfield Hogin =

American politician (1823–1886)

John Chrisfield Hogin (28 June 1823 – 30 August 1886) was an American politician.

John Hogin was born in Brookville, Indiana, on 28 June 1823. His parents were James Latimer Hogin and Eliza Crouch. In 1832, the elder Hogan and his son moved to Indianapolis and started a business together. John Hogan married Christina H. Richards, of Highland County, Ohio, in 1847. The couple moved to Sigourney, Iowa, in 1848 where Hogin established his own business. He retired in 1877, but soon returned as a pharmacist and bookseller. Hogin was a Republican member of the Iowa Senate between 1864 and 1866 for District 17. He died on 30 August 1866.
