= 29th Iowa Infantry Regiment =

American Civil War Infantry Regiment

- Iowa state flag
- Active: December 1, 1862, to August 10, 1865
- Country: United States
- Allegiance: Union
- Branch: Infantry

The 29th Iowa Infantry Regiment was an infantry regiment that served in the Union Army during the American Civil War.

== Service ==
The 29th Iowa Infantry was organized at Council Bluffs, Iowa and mustered in for three years of Federal service on December 1, 1862.

Sophronia Smith Hunt was an American woman who disguised herself as a man and secretly served as a soldier in the Union Army during the American Civil War. Her first soldier husband died of wounds received at the Battle of Jenkins' Ferry. They served in Company C of the 29th Iowa Infantry Regiment.

The regiment was mustered out on August 10, 1865.

== Total strength and casualties ==
A total of 1485 men served in the 29th Iowa at one time or another during its existence. It suffered 1 officer and 42 enlisted men who were killed in action or who died of their wounds and 1 officer and 266 enlisted men who died of disease, for a total of 310 fatalities.

== Commanders ==
- Colonel Thomas H. Benton Jr.

== See also ==
- List of Iowa Civil War Units
- Iowa in the American Civil War
