= Theophilus Crawford =

American politician in Iowa (1806–1877)

Theophilus Crawford (28 April 1806 – 12 December 1877) was an American politician.

Born in Putney, Vermont, on 28 April 1806, Theophilus Crawford was raised in the Theophilus Crawford House, built by and named for his father, who was of Scottish descent. The younger Theophilus Crawford was trained as a surveyor in Michigan, and subsequently moved to Dubuque, Iowa, in 1842. Two years later, he was selected as Dubuque County's representative to the Iowa constitutional convention. From the city of Dubuque, Crawford moved to Dyersville and served on the county board of supervisors.

Between 1846 and 1850, Crawford was a member of the Iowa Senate, serving alongside Thomas Hart Benton and John G. Shields as Democratic legislators representing District 15. Crawford was later elected to three nonconsecutive full terms on the Iowa House of Representatives, holding the District 20 seat from 1850 to 1852, the District 7 seat between 1858 and 1860, and the District 49 seat from 1870 to 1872. He died on 12 December 1877 in Peosta, Iowa, during his fourth term as state representative, having served as a legislator for District 56 since 1876.
