= Sophronia Smith Hunt =

American woman soldier in the Union Army during the Civil War

Sophronia Smith Hunt (Note: Historian Shirley Sides, who arranged for her headstone, gives Hunt's first name as "Sophronia". Newspaper accounts at her death listed her name as "Satronia".) (née Allen; October 1846 – August 1, 1928) was an American woman who disguised herself as a man and secretly served as a soldier in the Union Army during the American Civil War. Her first soldier husband died after he was wounded at the Battle of Jenkins' Ferry. They served in the 29th Iowa Infantry Regiment.

== Early life and education ==
Sophronia Allen, daughter of Cyrus and Eunice (née Lewis) Allen, was born in October 1846, probably in Illinois. She had a rudimentary education. She married James Andrew Jackson Smith on September 4, 1863.

== Civil War service ==
DeAnne Blanton writes that the existence of women soldiers such as Hunt "was no secret during or after the Civil War"; however, newspaper articles about them provided "few specific details about the individual woman's army career". According to the Sioux City Journal, "Hunt was one of an estimated 400 women who dressed as a man and served on the front lines for the Union Army during the Civil War."

She enlisted in Company C, 29th Iowa Infantry Regiment, alongside her husband, in January 1864. After being found out about a month later, she was allowed to remain with the regiment as a battlefield nurse. The 29th Iowa Infantry regiment fought at the Battle of Jenkins Ferry at the end of April 1864, where her husband lost a leg in battle and subsequently died as a POW. She left the army, never having been wounded in battle.

== Later life, death, and memorial ==
After mustering out, she married John Hunt, another Iowa veteran of the war. The couple had eight children, only one of whom survived her.

She died August 1, 1928, at Sioux City, Iowa, at age 81 years, 10 months. Installed 88 years after her death, her headstone carries the words: "Civil War Veteran."

Tim Gallagher writes in the Sioux City Journal:

The details come from Shirley Sides, a historian who focuses on the people and places in and around Dakota City, Nebraska, her home. Sides' interest and pursuit helped get a headstone in place for this Civil War veteran on Veterans Day some 88 years after her death.

"They asked if the stone should say Civil War nurse," Sides said. "I said, "Heck no! It darn well better say, 'Civil War veteran.'"

The obituary Sides unearthed comes from the Aug. 9, 1928, edition of the South Sioux City Eagle newspaper. It notes that young Sophronia's use of a manly disguise in the Civil War hid her identity for one month of fighting.

"She carried a gun just as other soldiers did," Sides said with conviction. "But she didn't have a headstone all these years."

== See also ==
- Bibliography of works on wartime cross-dressing
- List of female American Civil War soldiers
- Timeline of women in war in the United States, Pre-1945
