= James Latimer Hogin =

American politician (1801–1876)

James Latimer Hogin (7 March 1801 – 7 December 1876) was an American politician.

Hogin was born in Kent County, Delaware, on 7 March 1801 and was trained as a shoemaker.

He moved to Brookville, Indiana, in March 1819, and married Wellsburg, Virginia native Eliza J. Crouch on 3 September 1822. The couple's children included a son, John Chrisfield Hogin. Father and son moved to Indianapolis in 1832 to start a business. From 1845, they were residents of Danville, Iowa. Later, the family settled in Sigourney, Iowa.

Hogin was elected to the Iowa Senate as a Whig in 1854. He represented District 13 until 1856, when he was redistricted to District 15 and joined the Republican Party. Hogin stepped down from the state senate in January 1858.

Hogin was an active Freemason and held several positions within the Grand Lodge of Iowa. He was elected Grand Master in 1854.

Hogin died on 7 December 1876.
