= Brad Cavanagh =

Mayor of Dubuque, Iowa

Mayor of Dubuque
- Incumbent
- Assumed office November 2021
- Preceded by: Roy D. Buol

Councilman of Dubuque, Iowa
- In office November 2019 – November 2021
- Preceded by: Jake Rios

Personal details
- Born: 1978 or 1979
- Party: Democratic
- Spouse: Jennifer Cavanagh
- Children: 2
- Education: University of Iowa (BA); Saint Louis University (MA)

Brad Cavanagh (born 1978 or 1979) an American politician who is the mayor of Dubuque, Iowa. Cavanagh has been elected to two terms as mayor after serving as councilman for the fourth ward of Dubuque. Before that, he taught at Loras College.

== Education and teaching career ==
Cavanagh received his bachelor's degree from the University of Iowa and his master's degree from Saint Louis University, both in social work.

Cavanagh worked as an associate professor at Loras College from 2010 to 2021.

== Political career ==
In 2018, Cavanagh attempted to run for a seat in the Iowa House of Representatives against Lindsay James. He then ran for councilman of the fourth ward in Dubuque, advocating for increasing public–private partnerships, in 2019.

Cavanagh won his first term as mayor in November 2021 against David Resnick, succeeding Roy D. Buol, elected in 2005. In his first term, Cavanagh restarted daily air service to Dubuque Regional Airport, increased pay for police and firefighters, and approved around 2,400 housing units. Cavanagh won his second term as mayor, beating out Jason Davis, in November 2025. While campaigning, he put emphasis on the housing issue and progress made during his first term while conceding that the city's funding of the airport was partially out of hand. In 2026, Cavanagh opposed a bill in the Iowa Senate that would limit property taxes.

Cavanagh is a registered Democrat.
