= Samuel F. Dale House =

Historic house in Pennsylvania, United States

- U.S. National Register of Historic Places
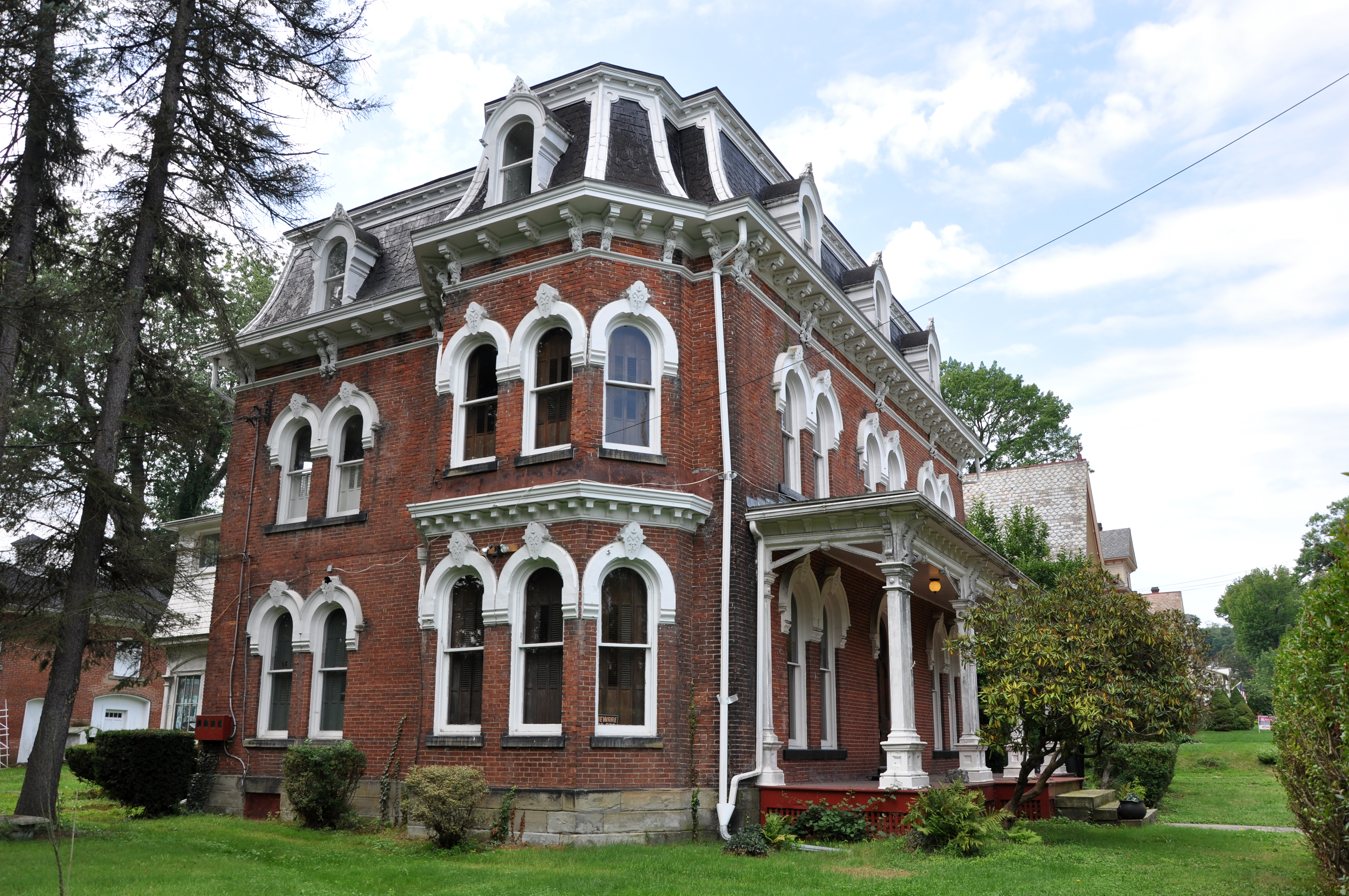
- View from lawn near Elk Street in 2012

- Location within Pennsylvania Location within the United States
- Location: 1409 Elk St., Franklin, Pennsylvania
- Coordinates: 41°23′55″N 79°50′4″W
- Area: 0.5 acres (0.20 ha)
- Built: 1875
- Architectural style: Second Empire
- NRHP reference No.: 75001670
- Added to NRHP: December 4, 1975

The Samuel F. Dale House is an historic home that is located in Franklin, Venango County, Pennsylvania, United States.

It was listed on the National Register of Historic Places in 1975.

== History and architectural features ==
Built in 1875, his historic structure is a large two-story, brick dwelling that was designed in the Second Empire style. It has a gabled wing with solarium and sleeping porch, and features a slate-covered mansard roof, a two-story projecting bay, and porches across the front and rear facades. Also located on the property is a contributing carriage house that was converted to a garage.
