= George W. Wilkinson =

American politician

George W. Wilkinson was an American politician.

Wilkinson was born in Virginia in 1810. He moved to Bloomington Township, Muscatine County, Iowa, where he was a farmer. He lived with his wife Mary, a Pennsylvania native born in 1825. Wilkinson was elected to the Iowa Senate as a Whig from District 17. Prior to the 1856 Iowa Senate election, Wilkinson was redistricted to District 19 and joined the Know Nothings. He stepped down from the state senate in January 1858.
