= Isaac Mosher Preston =

American politician (1813–1880)

Isaac Mosher Preston (April 25, 1813 – March 6, 1880) was an American politician.

Preston was born in either Cambridge, New York, or Bennington, Vermont in 1813, the son of a veteran of the American Revolutionary War. He moved to Dayton, Ohio, in 1838, and continued westward to Iowa City, Iowa, in 1840. He subsequently relocated to Marion, Iowa, in November 1842, and served as district attorney between December 1845 and March 1847, until his appointment as United States District Attorney for Iowa by President James K. Polk. Preston had previously been elected probate judge for Linn County twice, in 1843 and 1846. During the Mexican–American War, he was commissioned as a colonel.

Preston was elected to the Iowa General Assembly for the first time in 1850 as a Democratic legislator for District 18 of the Iowa House of Representatives. Upon completing a single term as state representative, he won election to the Iowa Senate, representing District 23 until 1856. Preston moved to Cedar Rapids, Iowa, approximately one year before his death at age 66 in 1880.
