= William W. Hamilton =

American politician (1810–1866)

William W. Hamilton (11 January 1810 – 8 March 1866) was an English-born American politician.

Hamilton was born in England on 11 January 1810. He settled in Dubuque, Iowa, in 1845, where he practiced law. Between 1849 and 1852, Hamilton was probate judge of Dubuque County. In 1854, Hamilton was a Whig Party candidate for District 24 of the Iowa Senate. He won the seat and was elected president of the senate by his legislative colleagues. Hamilton County, Iowa was created in 1856 and named after him. Hamilton was redistricted to District 31 prior to the 1856 Iowa Senate election and joined the Republican Party that year. As the 1857 Constitution of Iowa came into force, Hamilton's duties as senate president were transferred to the lieutenant governor and his district was up for election. David S. Wilson replaced Hamilton. Hamilton died on 8 March 1866, in Cascade, Iowa.
