= William F. Coolbaugh =

American politician

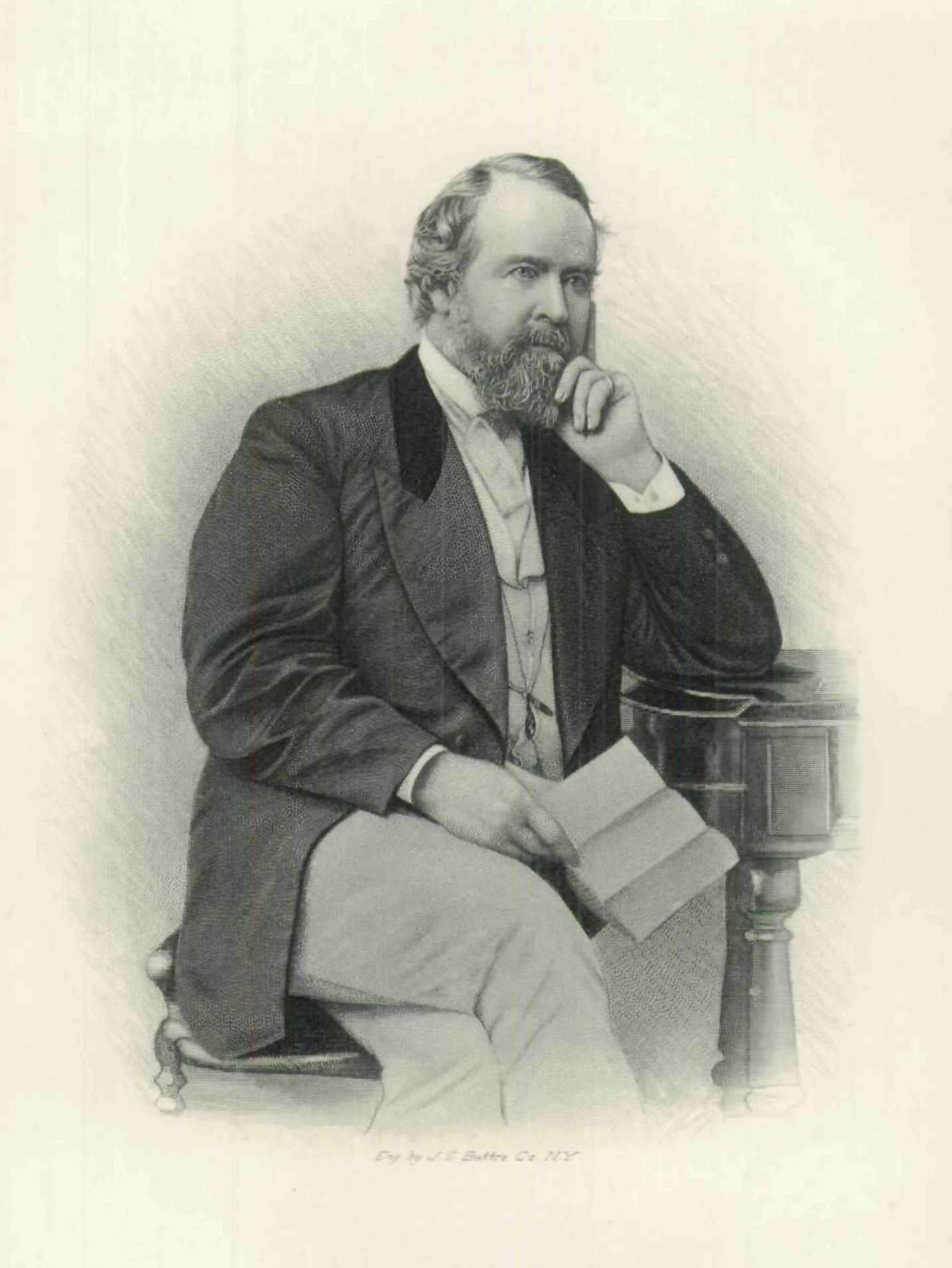

Member of the Iowa Senate from the Des Moines County district
- In office 1854 – 1862
- Preceded by: George Hepner
- Succeeded by: John G. Foote

Personal details
- Born: July 1, 1821 Pike County, Pennsylvania
- Died: November 14, 1877 (aged 56) Chicago, Illinois
- Resting place: Graceland Cemetery
- Party: Democratic
- Profession: Banker

William Findlay Coolbaugh (July 1, 1821 – November 14, 1877) was an American politician and banker from Pennsylvania. After working his way up the ranks at a Philadelphia dry goods house, he began his own store in Burlington, Iowa, in 1842. He became active in Iowa politics, serving in the Iowa Senate from 1854 to 1862. In 1855, he was the Democratic Party candidate to the United States Senate, but lost. In 1862, he moved to Chicago, Illinois, to set up a banking house which became the Union National Bank of Chicago. Coolbaugh was also the father-in-law of Chief Justice of the United States Melville Fuller. Coolbaugh died of an apparent suicide in 1877.

== Biography ==
William Findlay Coolbaugh was born in Pike County, Pennsylvania, on July 1, 1821, to Moses and Mary Coolbaugh. He was raised on the family farm and attended school in the winter. William Bross was one of Coolbaugh's teachers. When he was fifteen, three years after his last schooling, Coolbaugh left the family to work in Philadelphia, Pennsylvania. He took a position as an assistant porter in a dry goods house. When he was eighteen, he was promoted to confidential clerk. He continued to learn the trade and was eventually tasked with all Western operations of the dry goods house. In 1842, Coolbaugh left the house to set up his own operation in Burlington, Iowa. He sold goods for eight years, then left the business to become a banker. Co-founding Coolbaugh & Brooks, his bank was eventually merged into the Burlington Branch of the State Bank.

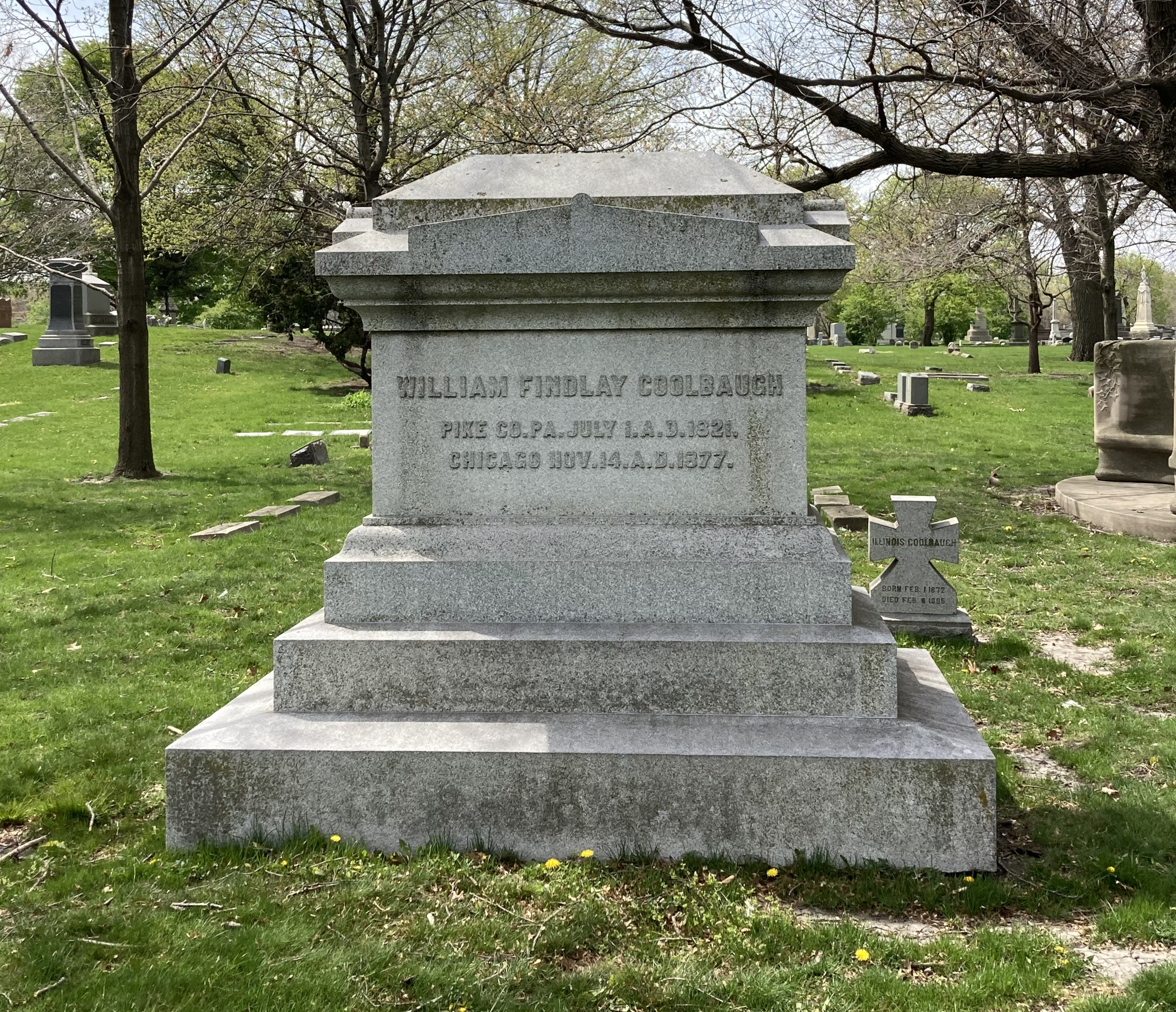
Coolbaugh's grave at Graceland Cemetery

Coolbaugh was active in early Iowa politics as a Democrat. The First General Assembly named him the state's first Loan Agent in 1847. He was a delegate to the 1852 Democratic National Convention and voted for Stephen A. Douglas in all 49 ballots. In 1854, Coolbaugh was elected to the Iowa Senate, serving until 1862. Coolbaugh was the Democratic candidate for United States Senate in 1855, but was narrowly defeated by James Harlan. He chaired the Iowa delegation to the 1856 Democratic National Convention. Coolbaugh sided with the War Democrats upon the outbreak of the Civil War, supporting the Union.

In the spring of 1862, Coolbaugh moved to Chicago, Illinois, to found the W. F. Coolbaugh & Co. banking house. The bank represented the interests of the State Bank of Iowa, which Coolbaugh helped to found during his Iowa Senate tenure. In February 1865, the house was renamed the Union National Bank of Chicago; by 1867, it owned over $4.2 million in assets. he was president of the Chicago Clearing House upon its founding and was president of the Bankers' Association of the West and South. In 1868, he was named treasurer of the Chicago, Rock Island and Pacific Railroad. He also served on the board of directors of the Chicago Board of Trade. His last political appointment was as a delegate to the 1870 Constitution of Illinois Convention. Coolbaugh died in Chicago on November 14, 1877, of an apparent suicide by gunshot in front of the Stephen A. Douglas Tomb. He was buried at Graceland Cemetery. The Union National Bank merged into the First National Bank of Chicago in 1900.

Coolbaugh married Jane L. Brown in 1844. They had seven children, though only three survived to adulthood. In 1864, after the death of his first wife, Coolbaugh married Addie Reeve. They had three surviving children. Daughter Mary Ellen married Chief Justice of the United States Melville Fuller in 1866.
