= Julius J. Matthews =

American physician and politician (1826–1916)

Julius J. Matthews (8 January 1826 – 27 April 1916) was an American physician and politician.

Born in Perry County, Ohio, on 8 January 1826, Matthews moved to Indiana in 1835. He settled in Iowa City, Iowa, four years later. Between 1846 and 1852, Matthews attended the College of Physicians and Surgeons in Keokuk. After earning his medical degree, Matthews relocated to Lyons.

Two years after Matthews moved to Lyons, he was elected to the Iowa Senate. He represented District 18 as a Whig from 1854 to 1856, then was redistricted to District 23 and changed his party affiliation to Republican, serving until 1858. After stepping down from the state senate, Matthews remained active in municipal political offices, as an alderman and school board member. He was also postmaster of Lyons from 1867 to 1879.

Matthews married P. L. Sanders in Iowa City in November 1856. The couple raised six children. Between 1879 and 1913, Matthews resided in Greene County, primarily in Dana. He then moved to Maywood, Illinois, where one of his surviving sons and daughter lived. Matthews died on 27 April 1916, aged 90. His remains were returned to Lyons and interred at Oakland Cemetery.
