= William Leffingwell (Iowa politician) =

American politician (1822–1884)

William Edward Leffingwell (October 9, 1822 – August 13, 1884) was an American politician.

Leffingwell was born in New London, Connecticut, on October 9, 1822. He later moved to Iowa, settling in DeWitt by 1845. Leffingwell served in the first Iowa General Assembly from 1846 to 1848, as a Democratic legislator for District 18 of the Iowa House of Representatives. He was seated in the Iowa Senate between 1850 and 1854, representing District 12 and District 18 for two years each. From 1853 to 1854, Leffingwell served as president of the senate and concurrently was a district court judge.

In 1861, Leffingwell enlisted in the 1st Iowa Cavalry Regiment after the American Civil War began and was captain of Company B. In later life, he moved to Lyons, where he died on August 13, 1884.
