= Warner Lewis =

American politician

Warner Lewis (November 1804 – 4 May 1888) was an American politician.

Born in Goochland County, Virginia, in November 1804, Lewis moved westward in adulthood, working in the mines of Michigan Territory by 1827. While a resident of the region, he was appointed clerk of the United States District Court of Michigan Territory. He served in the Black Hawk War, and moved to what became Dubuque, Iowa, in 1833. During the first session of the Wisconsin Territorial Legislature, Lewis was elected chief clerk of the Wisconsin Territorial House of Representatives. When Iowa Territory was formed in 1838, Lewis served on the first and second Iowa Territorial Legislative Assembly from 12 November 1838 to 1 November 1840, as a Democrat representing District 8. He occupied the District 10 seat in the fourth Legislative Assembly, which met from 6 December 1841 to 4 December 1842. During this term, Lewis was elected speaker of the house. During Robert Lucas's governorship of Iowa Territory, Lewis was appointed major general and organizer of the Iowa militia. From 1845, Lewis served as register of the United States General Land Office at Dubuque. In 1850, he returned to the state legislature, as a member of the Iowa Senate from the multi-member District 15. Prior to the 1852 Iowa Senate election, Lewis was redistricted to District 24, which was also a multi-member district. He stepped down from the state senate in 1854.

From 1853, during the presidency of Franklin Pierce, Lewis was appointed Surveyor-General for Iowa, Wisconsin and Minnesota. Pierce's successor James Buchanan reappointed Lewis to a second term in that position. Lewis's tenure in local government included 24 years as Dubuque County recorder. He died in the city of Dubuque on 4 May 1888.
