= John G. Shields =

American politician (1811–1856)

John G. Shields (22 May 1811 – 25 June 1856) was an American politician.

Born in Grayson County, Kentucky, on 22 May 1811, Shields moved to land in the Black Hawk Purchase shortly after the treaty was signed. From 1835, he ran a store in the lead mines at what became Dubuque, Iowa, and sold goods throughout the lumber-producing regions of Wisconsin and Minnesota. Politically, Shields was affiliated with the Democratic Party. He served several terms as alderman in Dubuque and was elected later mayor of the city. Shields was elected to the Iowa Senate for the first time in District 15. He won reelection in the multi-member District 24, serving alongside Warner Lewis, Maturin L. Fisher, and William W. Hamilton. Shields died on 25 June 1856, while visiting St. Anthony, Minnesota, for health purposes.

== See also ==
- List of mayors of Dubuque, Iowa
