= Alvin Saunders =

American politician

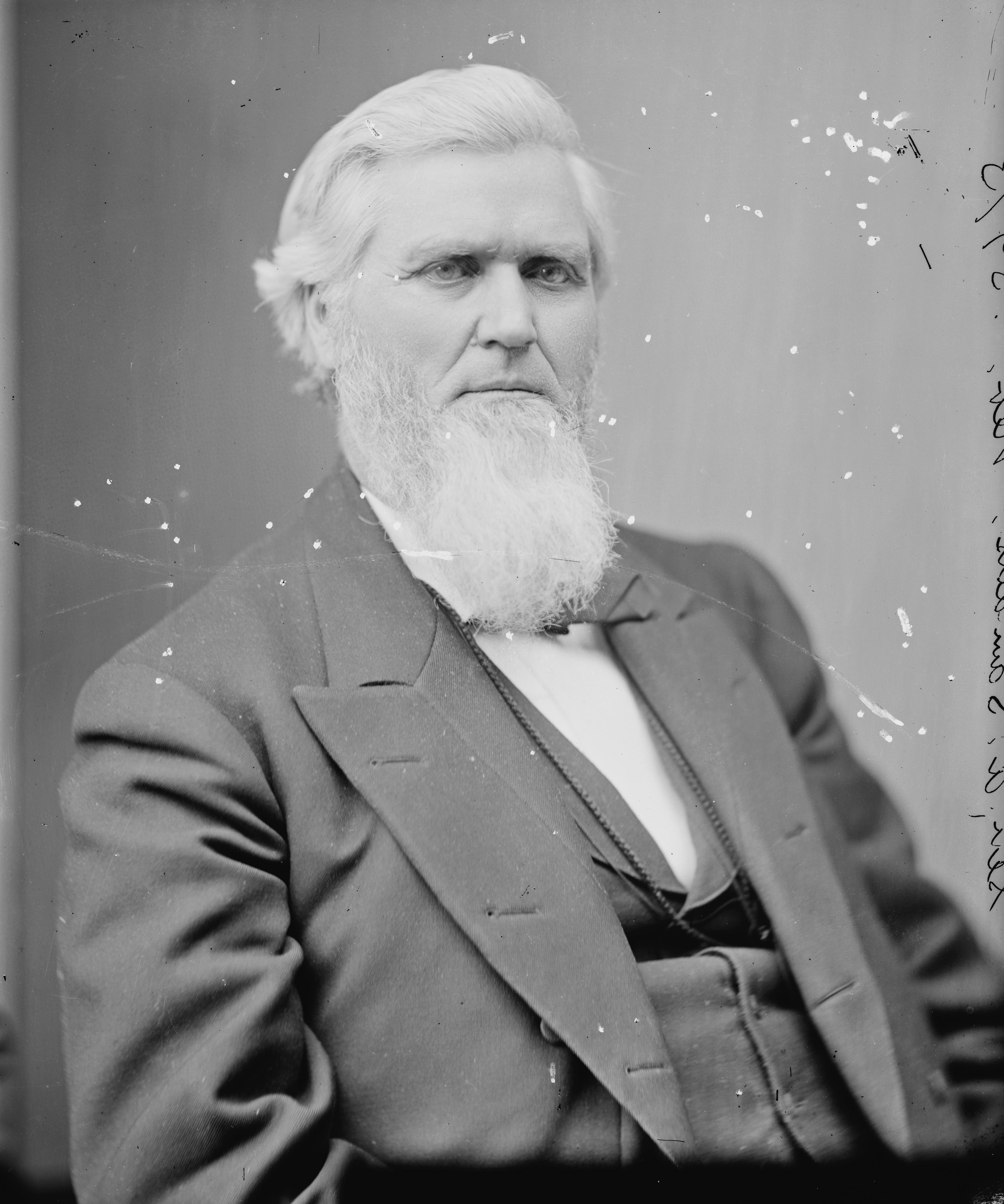

United States Senator from Nebraska
- In office March 4, 1877 – March 3, 1883
- Preceded by: Phineas Hitchcock
- Succeeded by: Charles F. Manderson

5th Governor of Nebraska Territory
- In office May 15, 1861 – February 21, 1867
- President: Abraham Lincoln; Andrew Johnson
- Preceded by: Algernon S. Paddock
- Succeeded by: David Butler (as Governor of the State of Nebraska)

Member of the Iowa Senate
- In office December 4, 1854 – May 14, 1861

Personal details
- Born: July 12, 1817 Fleming County, Kentucky
- Died: November 1, 1899 (aged 82) Omaha, Nebraska
- Resting place: Forest Lawn Memorial Park
- Party: Republican
- Relatives: William Henry Harrison III (grandson)

Alvin Saunders (July 12, 1817 – November 1, 1899) was a U.S. senator from Nebraska, as well as the final and longest-serving governor of the Nebraska Territory, a tenure he served during most of the American Civil War.

== Education ==
Saunders was born in Fleming County, Kentucky. He attended the common schools and pursued an academic course; he moved with his father to Illinois in 1829 and then to Mount Pleasant, Iowa (then a part of Wisconsin Territory) in 1836.

== Political career ==
He was the postmaster of Mount Pleasant for seven years. Saunders studied law but never entered into practice; instead, he engaged in mercantile pursuits and banking. He was a delegate to the Iowa State constitutional convention in 1846 and was a member of the Iowa State Senate from December 4, 1854, to May 14, 1861. Saunders served the first two years of his legislative tenure as a Whig for District 5, then changed his party affiliation to Republican, holding the District 7 seat until 1860, when he assumed the District 9 seat. Saunders was one of the commissioners appointed by Congress to organize the Union Pacific Railroad Company.

He served as the last Governor of Nebraska Territory from 1861 to 1867. He was a delegate to the 1868 Republican National Convention. Saunders was elected as a Republican to the United States Senate and served a single term from March 4, 1877, to March 3, 1883; chairman of the Committee on Territories (Forty-seventh Congress). He died in Omaha on November 1, 1899; interment in Forest Lawn Cemetery.

== Family ==
Saunders' father, Gunnel, was said to be of "old stock" in Culpeper County, Virginia. His mother was Mary Mauzy of the same county. They moved to Kentucky and later to Illinois, where Alvin attended school and did farm work until 1836, when the young man removed to Mount Pleasant, Iowa, which was then part of Wisconsin.

At his death he left a wife and two children, Charles B., and a daughter, Mary (later Mrs. Russell Harrison of Washington, D.C.)

Saunders was the grandfather of William Henry Harrison III, who served several terms as Wyoming's member of the U.S. House of Representatives in the 1950s and 60s. His son-in-law was Russell Benjamin Harrison.

== Legacy ==
Saunders County, Nebraska and Saunders School in Omaha were both named after him. Alvin Saunders Johnson, the founding editor of The New Republic, was named in honor of Saunders.

Political offices
Preceded by Algernon S. Paddock; Acting Territorial Governor	Governor of Nebraska Territory; 1861–1867	Succeeded by position abolished
U.S. Senate
Preceded by Phineas W. Hitchcock	U.S. senator (Class 2) from Nebraska; 1877–1883; Served alongside: Algernon S. Paddock, Charles H. Van Wyck	Succeeded by Charles F. Manderson
