= 1960 United States gubernatorial elections =

- November 8, 1960

27 governorships
	Majority party	Minority party
Party	Democratic	Republican
Seats before	33	17 (Note: John H. Reed (R) succeeded Maine Governor Clinton Clauson (D) upon his death in December 1959.) (Note: Dwight Burney (R) succeeded Nebraska Governor Ralph G. Brooks (D) upon his death in September 1960.)
Seats after	34	16
Seat change	▲1	▼1
Seats up	14	13
Seats won	15	12
- Democratic hold Democratic gain Republican hold Republican gain No election

United States gubernatorial elections were held on 8 November 1960, in 27 states. The elections were concurrent with the House elections, the Senate elections and the presidential election.

In Minnesota, this was the last election on a 2-year cycle, before switching to a 4-year term for governors.

== Race summary ==
State	Governor	Party	First elected	Status	Candidates
Arizona	Paul Fannin	Republican	1958	Incumbent re-elected.	▌ ✓ Paul Fannin (Republican) 59.3%; ▌ Lee Ackerman (Democratic) 40.7%
Arkansas	Orval Faubus	Democratic	1954	Incumbent re-elected.	▌ ✓ Orval Faubus (Democratic) 69.2%; ▌ Henry M. Britt (Republican) 30.8%
Delaware	J. Caleb Boggs	Republican	1952	Incumbent term-limited. Democratic gain.	▌ ✓ Elbert N. Carvel (Democratic) 51.7%; ▌ John W. Rollins (Republican) 48.3%
Florida	LeRoy Collins	Democratic	1954 (special)	Incumbent term-limited. Democratic hold.	▌ ✓ C. Farris Bryant (Democratic) 59.9%; ▌ George C. Petersen (Republican) 40.2%
Illinois	William Stratton	Republican	1952	Incumbent lost re-election. Democratic gain.	▌ ✓ Otto Kerner Jr. (Democratic) 55.5%; ▌ William Stratton (Republican) 44.3%; ▌ Edward C. Gross (Socialist Labor) 0.19%
Indiana	Harold W. Handley	Republican	1956	Incumbent term-limited. Democratic gain.	▌ ✓ Matthew E. Welsh (Democratic) 50.4%; ▌ Crawford F. Parker (Republican) 49.3%; ▌ J. Ralston Miller (Prohibition) 0.28%; ▌ Herman Kronewitter (Socialist Labor) 0.04%
Iowa	Herschel C. Loveless	Democratic	1956	Incumbent retired. Republican gain.	▌ ✓ Norman A. Erbe (Republican) 52.1%; ▌ Edward Joseph McManus (Democratic) 47.9%
Kansas	George Docking	Democratic	1956	Incumbent lost re-election. Republican gain.	▌ ✓ John Anderson Jr. (Republican) 55.5%; ▌ George Docking (Democratic) 43.6%; ▌J.J. Steele (Prohibition) 1.0%
Maine (special)	John H. Reed	Republican	1959 (Note: Reed became governor in 1959 when predecessor (Clinton Clauson) died.)	Incumbent re-elected.	▌ ✓ John H. Reed (Republican) 52.7%; ▌ Frank M. Coffin (Democratic) 47.3%
Massachusetts	Foster Furcolo	Democratic	1954	Incumbent retired. Republican gain.	▌ ✓ John Volpe (Republican) 52.5%; ▌ Joseph D. Ward (Democratic) 46.8%; ▌Henning A. Blomen (Socialist Labor) 0.39%; ▌Guy S. Williams (Prohibition) 0.31%
Michigan	G. Mennen Williams	Democratic	1948	Incumbent retired. Democratic hold.	▌ ✓ John Swainson (Democratic) 50.5%; ▌Paul Douglas Bagwell (Republican) 49.2%; ▌Robert Himmel Jr. (Socialist Workers) 0.10%; ▌Delmar D. Gibbons (Prohibition) 0.07%; ▌ F.J. Toohey (Tax Cut) 0.06%; ▌Theos A. Grove (Socialist Labor) 0.05%; ▌R. Roy Pursell (Ind. American) 0.04%
Minnesota	Orville Freeman	Democratic	1954	Incumbent lost re-election. Republican gain.	▌ ✓ Elmer L. Andersen (Republican) 50.6%; ▌ Orville Freeman (DFL) 49.1%; ▌ Rudolph Gustafson (Industrial Government) 0.36%
Missouri	James T. Blair Jr.	Democratic	1956	Incumbent term-limited. Democratic hold.	▌ ✓ John M. Dalton (Democratic) 58.0%; ▌ Edward G. Farmer (Republican) 42.0%
Montana	J. Hugo Aronson	Republican	1952	Incumbent retired. Republican hold.	▌ ✓ Donald Grant Nutter (Republican) 55.1%; ▌ Paul Cannon (Democratic) 44.9%
Nebraska	Dwight Burney	Republican	1960 (Note: Burney became acting governor on September 9, 1960, after predecessor (Ralph G. Brooks) died.)	Incumbent returned to lieutenant governorship. Democratic gain.	▌ ✓ Frank B. Morrison (Democratic) 52.0%; ▌ John Cooper (Republican) 48.0%
New Hampshire	Wesley Powell	Republican	1958	Incumbent re-elected.	▌ ✓ Wesley Powell (Republican) 55.5%; ▌ Bernard L. Boutin (Democratic) 44.5%
New Mexico	John Burroughs	Democratic	1958	Incumbent lost re-election. Republican gain.	▌ ✓ Edwin L. Mechem (Republican) 50.33%; ▌ John Burroughs (Democratic) 49.67%
North Carolina	Luther H. Hodges	Democratic	1954 (Note: Hodges became governor in 1954 when predecessor (William B. Umstead) died.)	Incumbent term-limited. Democratic hold.	▌ ✓ Terry Sanford (Democratic) 54.5%; ▌ Robert L. Gavin (Republican) 45.5%; ▌ I. Beverly Lake (write-in) 0.08%
North Dakota	John E. Davis	Republican	1956	Incumbent retired. Democratic gain.	▌ ✓ William L. Guy (Democratic-NPL) 49.4%; ▌ Clarence P. Dahl (Republican) 44.5%; ▌ Herschel Lashkowitz (Independent) 6.1%
Rhode Island	Christopher Del Sesto	Republican	1958	Incumbent lost re-election. Democratic gain.	▌ ✓ John A. Notte Jr. (Democratic) 56.6%; ▌ Christopher Del Sesto (Republican) 43.4%
South Dakota	Ralph Herseth	Democratic	1958	Incumbent lost re-election. Republican gain.	▌ ✓ Archie M. Gubbrud (Republican) 50.7%; ▌ Ralph Herseth (Democratic) 49.3%
Texas	Price Daniel	Democratic	1956	Incumbent re-elected.	▌ ✓ Price Daniel (Democratic) 72.8%; ▌ William Steger (Republican) 27.3%
Utah	George Dewey Clyde	Republican	1956	Incumbent re-elected.	▌ ✓ George Dewey Clyde (Republican) 52.7%; ▌ William Arthur Barlocker (Democratic) 47.3%
Vermont	Robert Stafford	Republican	1958	Incumbent retired. Republican hold.	▌ ✓ F. Ray Keyser Jr. (Republican) 56.4%; ▌ Russell F. Niquette (Democratic) 43.6%
Washington	Albert Rosellini	Democratic	1956	Incumbent re-elected.	▌ ✓ Albert Rosellini (Democratic) 50.3%; ▌ Lloyd J. Andrews (Republican) 48.9%; ▌ Henry Killman (Socialist Labor) 0.7%; ▌ Jack W. Wright (Socialist Workers) 0.1%
West Virginia	Cecil H. Underwood	Republican	1956	Incumbent term-limited. Democratic gain.	▌ ✓ Wally Barron (Democratic) 54.0%; ▌ Harold E. Neely (Republican) 46.0%
Wisconsin	Gaylord Nelson	Democratic	1958	Incumbent re-elected.	▌ ✓ Gaylord Nelson (Democratic) 51.6%; ▌Philip G. Kuehn (Republican) 48.4%

== Closest races ==
States where the margin of victory was under 5%:

1. New Mexico, 0.65%
2. Indiana, 1.09%
3. Michigan, 1.28%
4. South Dakota, 1.46%
5. Washington, 1.47%
6. Minnesota, 1.48%
7. Wisconsin, 3.11%
8. Delaware, 3.46%
9. Nebraska, 4.01%
10. Indiana, 4.28%
11. North Dakota, 4.96%

States where the margin of victory was under 10%:

1. Utah, 5.32%
2. Maine, 5.34%
3. Massachusetts, 5.72%
4. West Virginia, 7.98%
5. North Carolina, 8.98%

Red denotes states won by Republicans. Blue denotes states won by Democrats.

== See also ==
- 1960 United States elections
  - 1960 United States presidential election
  - 1960 United States Senate elections
  - 1960 United States House of Representatives elections
