= 1958 United States gubernatorial elections =

- November 4, 1958; September 8, 1958 (ME); November 25, 1958 (AK)

34 governorships
	Majority party	Minority party
Party	Democratic	Republican
Seats before	29	19
Seats after	35	14
Seat change	▲6	▼5
Seats up	20	13
Seats won	26	8
- Democratic hold Democratic gain Republican hold Republican gain No election

United States gubernatorial elections were held in 1958, in 34 states, concurrent with the House and Senate elections, on November 4, 1958 (September 8 in Maine, November 25 in Alaska). Alaska held its first gubernatorial election on achieving statehood.

In Colorado, Maine and Ohio, the governor was elected to a 4-year term for the first time, instead of a 2-year term.

== Race summary ==
State	Governor	Party	First elected	Status	Candidates
Alabama	Jim Folsom	Democratic	1950	Incumbent term-limited. Democratic hold.	▌ ✓ John Malcolm Patterson (Democratic) 88.2%; ▌ William Longshore (Republican) 11.4%; ▌ William Jackson (Independent) 0.3%
Alaska	New state admitted			First governor elected. Democratic gain.	▌ ✓ William A. Egan (Democratic) 59.6%; ▌ John Butrovich (Republican) 39.4%; ▌ Mike Dollinter (Independent) 1.0%
Arizona	Ernest McFarland	Democratic	1954	Incumbent retired. Republican gain.	▌ ✓ Paul Fannin (Republican) 55.1%; ▌ Robert Morrison (Democratic) 44.9%
Arkansas	Orval Faubus	Democratic	1954	Incumbent re-elected.	▌ ✓ Orval Faubus (Democratic) 82.5%; ▌ George W. Johnson (Republican) 17.5%
California	Goodwin Knight	Republican	1953 (Note: Knight became governor when incumbent (Earl Warren) resigned.)	Incumbent retired. Democratic gain.	▌ ✓ Pat Brown (Democratic) 59.8%; ▌ William Knowland (Republican) 40.2%; ▌William Potter Gale (Independent) 0.04%
Colorado	Stephen McNichols	Democratic	1956	Incumbent re-elected.	▌ ✓ Stephen McNichols (Democratic) 58.4%; ▌ Palmer Burch (Republican) 41.6%
Connecticut	Abraham Ribicoff	Democratic	1954	Incumbent re-elected.	▌ ✓ Abraham Ribicoff (Democratic) 62.3%; ▌John Davis Lodge (Republican) 37.0%; ▌Jasper McLevy (Socialist) 0.7%
Georgia	Marvin Griffin	Democratic	1954	Incumbent term-limited. Democratic hold.	Primary results: ▌ ✓ Ernest Vandiver (Democratic) 80.51%; ▌ William T. Bodenhamer (Democratic) 14.16%; ▌ Lee Roy Abernathy (Democratic) 5.34%; General election: ▌ Ernest Vandiver (Democratic) 100.0%
Idaho	Robert E. Smylie	Republican	1954	Incumbent re-elected.	▌ ✓ Robert E. Smylie (Republican) 51.0%; ▌ Alfred M. Derr (Democratic) 49.0%
Iowa	Herschel C. Loveless	Democratic	1956	Incumbent re-elected.	▌ ✓ Herschel C. Loveless (Democratic) 54.1%; ▌ William G. Murray (Republican) 46.0%
Kansas	George Docking	Democratic	1956	Incumbent re-elected.	▌ ✓ George Docking (Democratic) 56.5%; ▌Clyde M. Reed Jr. (Republican) 42.5%; ▌Warren C. Martin (Prohibition) 1.0%
Maine	Edmund Muskie	Democratic	1954	Incumbent term-limited. Democratic hold.	▌ ✓ Clinton Clauson (Democratic) 52.0%; ▌ Horace Hildreth (Republican) 48.0%
Maryland	Theodore McKeldin	Republican	1950	Incumbent term-limited. Democratic gain.	▌ ✓ J. Millard Tawes (Republican) 63.6%; ▌James Devereux (Republican) 36.5%
Massachusetts	Foster Furcolo	Democratic	1954	Incumbent re-elected.	▌ ✓ Foster Furcolo (Democratic) 56.2%; ▌Charles Gibbons (Republican) 43.1%; ▌Henning A. Blomen (Socialist Labor) 0.41%; ▌Guy S. Williams (Prohibition) 0.30%
Michigan	G. Mennen Williams	Democratic	1948	Incumbent re-elected.	▌ ✓ G. Mennen Williams (Democratic) 53.0%; ▌Paul Douglas Bagwell (Republican) 46.6%; ▌Ralph Muncy (Socialist Labor) 0.17%; ▌Rollin M. Severance (Prohibition) 0.16%; ▌Frank Lovell (Socialist Workers) 0.04%
Minnesota	Orville Freeman	Democratic	1954	Incumbent re-elected.	▌ ✓ Orville Freeman (DFL) 56.8%; ▌ George MacKinnon (Republican) 42.3%; ▌ Arne Anderson (Industrial Government) 0.94%
Nebraska	Victor Anderson	Republican	1954	Incumbent lost re-election. Democratic gain.	▌ ✓ Ralph Brooks (Democratic) 50.19%; ▌ Victor Anderson (Republican) 49.80%
Nevada	Charles H. Russell	Republican	1950	Incumbent lost re-election. Democratic gain.	▌ ✓ Grant Sawyer (Democratic) 59.9%; ▌ Charles H. Russell (Republican) 40.1
New Hampshire	Lane Dwinell	Republican	1954	Incumbent retired. Republican gain.	▌ ✓ Wesley Powell (Republican) 51.7%; ▌ Bernard L. Boutin (Democratic) 48.4%
New Mexico	Edwin L. Mechem	Republican	1950; 1954 (retired); 1956	Incumbent lost re-election. Democratic gain.	▌ ✓ John Burroughs (Democratic) 50.47%; ▌ Edwin L. Mechem (Republican) 49.53%
New York	W. Averell Harriman	Democratic	1954	Incumbent lost re-election. Republican gain.	▌ ✓ Nelson Rockefeller (Republican) 54.7%; ▌ W. Averell Harriman (Democratic) 44.7%; ▌ John T. McManus (Ind. Socialist) 0.6%
North Dakota	John E. Davis	Republican	1956	Incumbent re-elected.	▌ ✓ John E. Davis (Republican) 53.1%; ▌ John F. Lord (Democratic-NPL) 46.9%
Ohio	C. William O'Neill	Republican	1956	Incumbent lost re-election. Democratic gain.	▌ ✓ Michael DiSalle (Democratic) 56.9%; ▌C. William O'Neill (Republican) 43.1%
Oklahoma	Raymond D. Gary	Democratic	1954	Incumbent term-limited. Democratic hold.	▌ ✓ J. Howard Edmondson (Democratic) 74.1%; ▌ Phil Ferguson (Republican) 20.0%; ▌ D.A. "Jelly" Bryce (Independent) 5.9%
Oregon	Robert D. Holmes	Democratic	1956	Incumbent lost re-election. Republican gain.	▌ ✓ Mark Hatfield (Republican) 55.3%; ▌ Robert D. Holmes (Democratic) 44.7%
Pennsylvania	George M. Leader	Democratic	1954	Incumbent term-limited. Democratic hold.	▌ ✓ David L. Lawrence (Democratic) 50.8%; ▌ Arthur T. McGonigle (Republican) 48.9%; ▌ Herman A. Johansen (Socialist Labor) 0.22%; ▌ Eloise Fickland (Workers) 0.11%
Rhode Island	Dennis J. Roberts	Democratic	1950	Incumbent lost re-election. Republican gain.	▌ ✓ Christopher Del Sesto (Republican) 50.9%; ▌ Dennis J. Roberts (Democratic) 49.1%
South Carolina	George Bell Timmerman Jr.	Democratic	1954	Incumbent term-limited. Democratic hold.	Primary election: ▌ ✓ Fritz Hollings (Democratic) 41.93%; ▌ ✓ Donald S. Russell (Democratic) 35.02%; ▌ William C. Johnston (Democratic) 23.06%; Primary runoff: ▌ ✓ Fritz Hollings (Democratic) 56.78%; ▌ Donald S. Russell (Democratic) 43.22%; General election: ▌ Fritz Hollings (Democratic) 100.0%
South Dakota	Joe Foss	Republican	1954	Incumbent term-limited. Democratic gain.	▌ ✓ Ralph Herseth (Democratic) 51.4%; ▌ Phil Saunders (Republican) 48.6%
Tennessee	Frank G. Clement	Democratic	1952	Incumbent term-limited. Democratic hold.	▌ ✓ Buford Ellington (Democratic) 57.5%; ▌ Jim Nance McCord (Independent) 31.5%; ▌ Tom Wall (Republican) 8.3%; ▌ Scattering 2.6%
Texas	Price Daniel	Democratic	1956	Incumbent re-elected.	▌ ✓ Price Daniel (Democratic) 88.1%; ▌ Edwin S. Mayer (Republican) 11.9%
Vermont	Joseph B. Johnson	Republican	1954	Incumbent retired. Republican hold.	▌ ✓ Robert Stafford (Republican) 50.3%; ▌ Bernard Joseph Leddy (Democratic) 49.7%
Wisconsin	Vernon Wallace Thomson	Republican	1956	Incumbent lost re-election. Democratic gain.	▌ ✓ Gaylord Nelson (Democratic) 53.6%; ▌Vernon Wallace Thomson (Republican) 46.3%; ▌Wayne Leverenz (Socialist Workers) 0.12%
Wyoming	Milward Simpson	Republican	1954	Incumbent lost re-election. Democratic gain.	▌ ✓ John J. Hickey (Democratic) 48.9%; ▌ Milward Simpson (Republican) 46.6%; ▌ Louis W. Carlson (Economy) 4.4%

== Closest races ==
States where the margin of victory was under 1%:

1. Nebraska, 0.39%
2. Vermont, 0.60%
3. New Mexico, 0.96%

States where the margin of victory was under 5%:

1. Rhode Island, 1.80%
2. Idaho, 1.92%
3. Pennsylvania, 1.92%
4. Wyoming, 2.30%
5. South Dakota, 2.80%
6. New Hampshire, 3.30%
7. Maine, 3.96%

States where the margin of victory was under 10%:

1. North Dakota, 6.20%
2. Michigan, 6.37%
3. Wisconsin, 7.31%
4. Iowa, 8.26%

Red denotes states won by Republicans. Blue denotes states won by Democrats.

== See also ==
- 1958 United States elections
  - 1958 United States House of Representatives elections
  - 1958 United States Senate elections
