= 1952 Iowa gubernatorial election =

- November 4, 1952
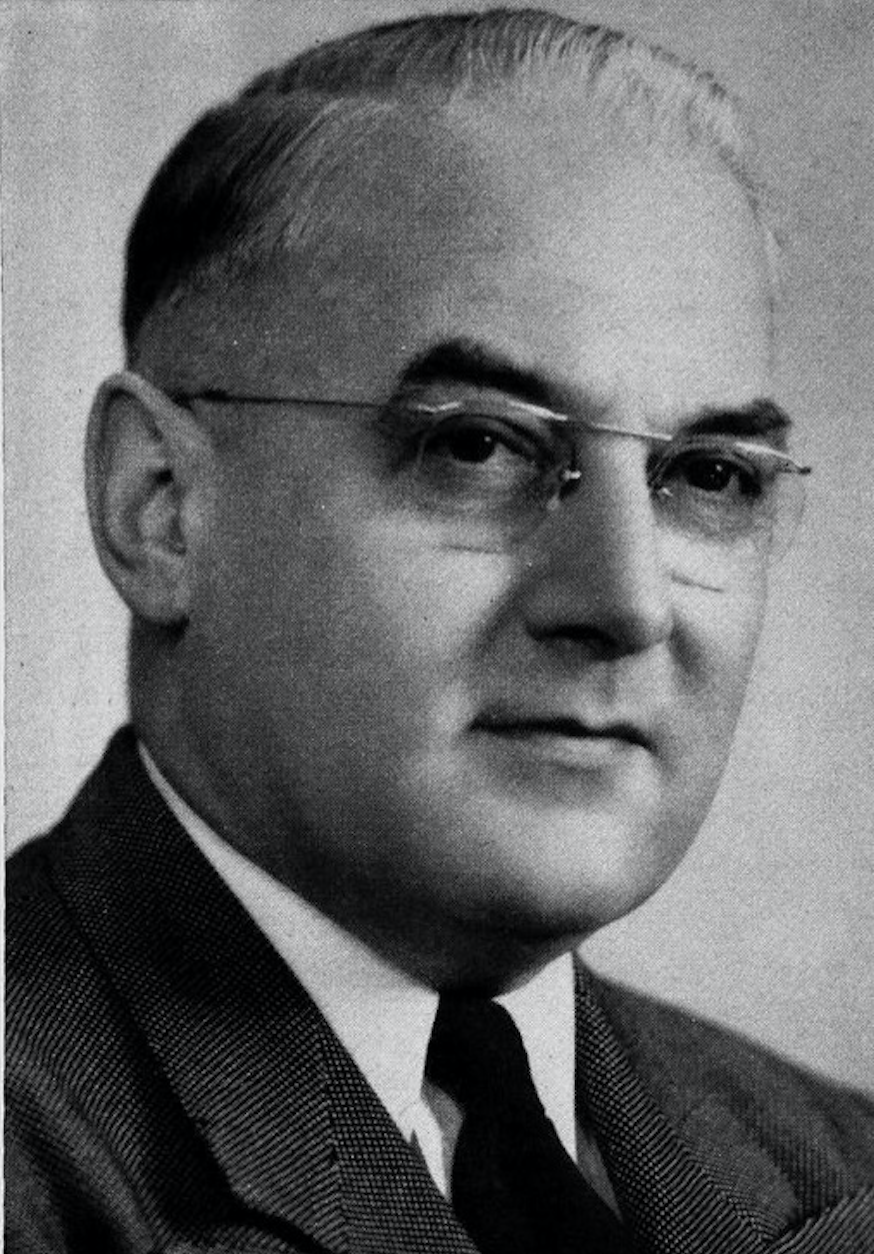

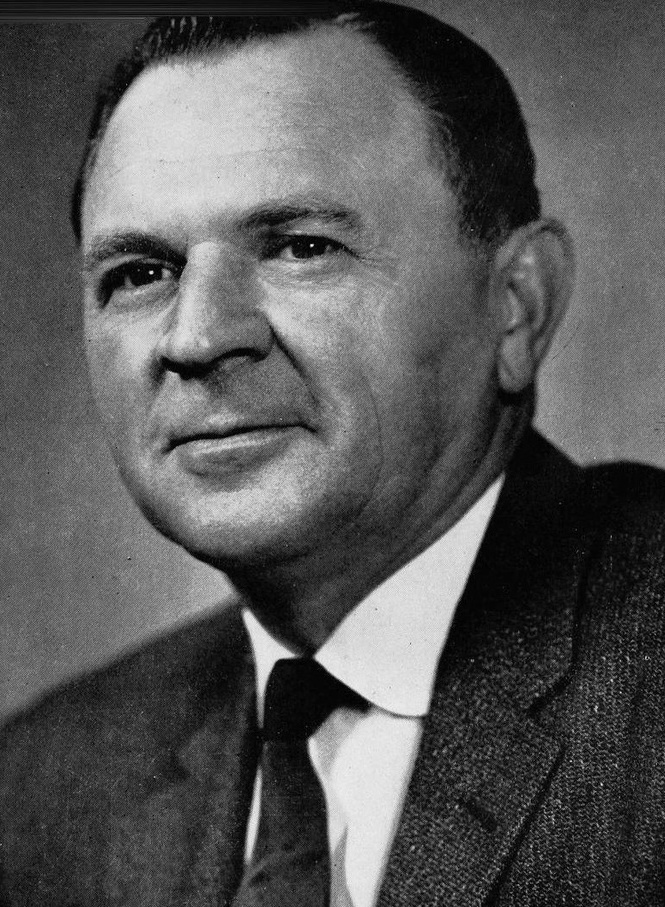
Nominee	William S. Beardsley	Herschel C. Loveless
Party	Republican	Democratic
Popular vote	638,388	587,671
Percentage	51.90%	47.78%
- County results Beardsley: 40–50% 50–60% 60–70% 70–80% Loveless: 50–60% 60–70%
Governor before election
William S. Beardsley
Republican
Elected Governor
William S. Beardsley
Republican

The 1952 Iowa gubernatorial election was held on November 4, 1952. Incumbent Republican William S. Beardsley defeated Democratic nominee and Mayor of Ottumwa Herschel C. Loveless with 51.90% of the vote.

== Primary elections ==
Primary elections were held on June 2, 1952.

=== Democratic primary ===
==== Candidates ====
- Herschel C. Loveless, Mayor of Ottumwa
- Otha Wearin, former U.S. Representative

==== Results ====
Democratic primary results
Party	Candidate	Votes	%
Democratic	Herschel C. Loveless	49,766	58.20
Democratic	Otha Wearin	35,742	41.80
Total votes		85,508	100.00

=== Republican primary ===
==== Candidates ====
- William S. Beardsley, incumbent Governor
- Kenneth A. Evans, former Lieutenant Governor
- William H. Nicholas, incumbent Lieutenant Governor

==== Results ====
Republican primary results
Party	Candidate	Votes	%
Republican	William S. Beardsley (incumbent)	129,145	38.78
Republican	Kenneth A. Evans	110,510	33.19
Republican	William H. Nicholas	93,336	28.03
Total votes		332,991	100.00

== General election ==
=== Candidates ===
Major party candidates

- William S. Beardsley, Republican
- Herschel C. Loveless, Democratic

Other candidates

- Z. Everett Kellum, Prohibition
- Ernest J. Seemann, Independent

=== Results ===
1952 Iowa gubernatorial election
Party	Candidate	Votes	%	±%
Republican	William S. Beardsley (incumbent)	638,388	51.90%	
Democratic	Herschel C. Loveless	587,671	47.78%	
Prohibition	Z. Everett Kellum	2,775	0.23%	
Independent	Ernest J. Seemann	1,202	0.10%	
Majority		50,717		
Turnout		1,230,045		
Republican hold		Swing		
