= 1960 Iowa gubernatorial election =

- November 8, 1960
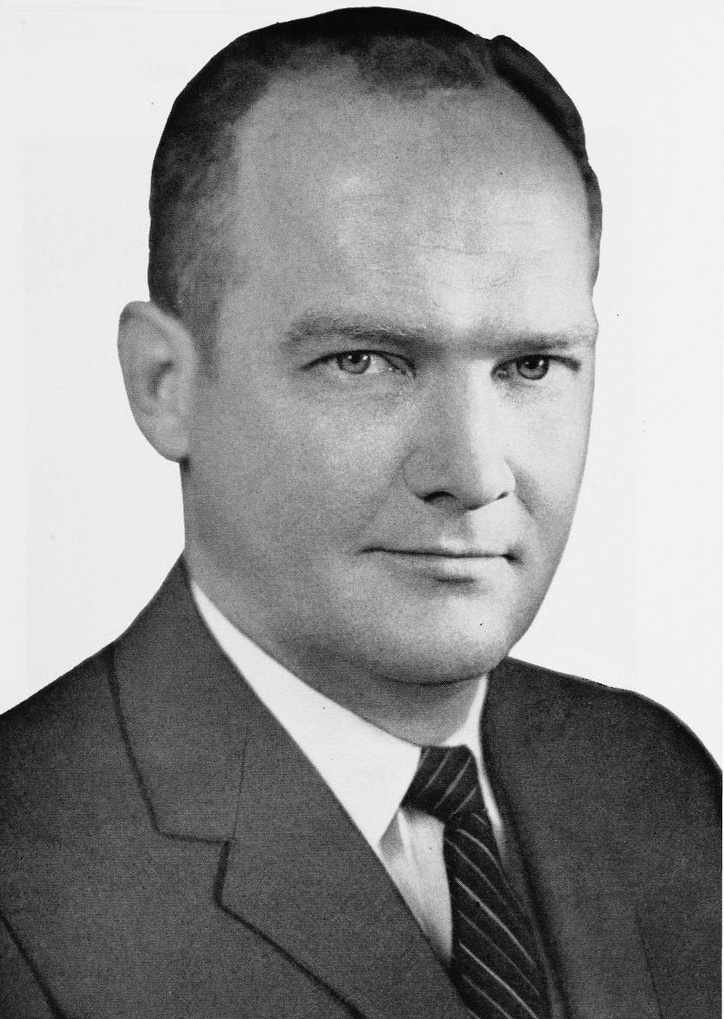

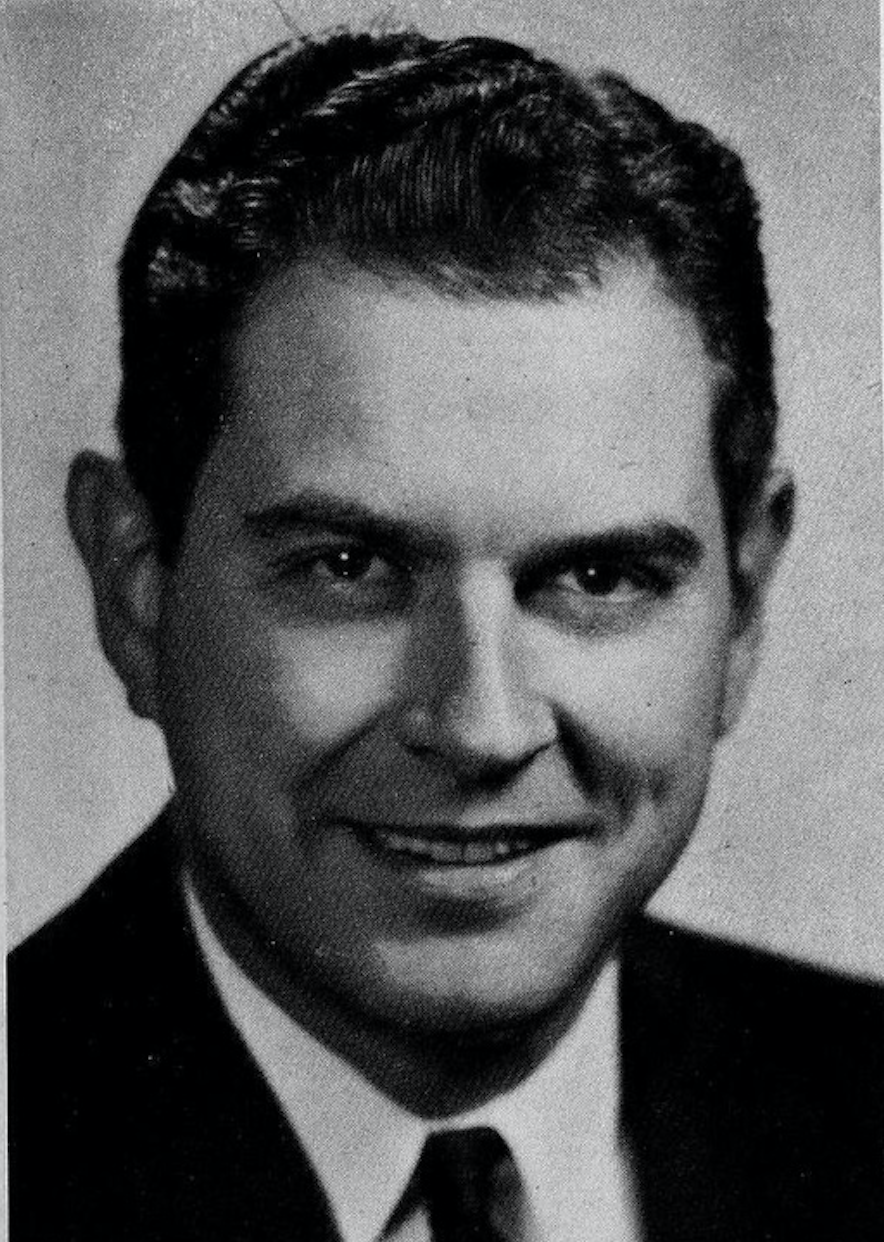
Nominee	Norman Erbe	Edward McManus
Party	Republican	Democratic
Popular vote	645,026	592,063
Percentage	52.14%	47.86%
- County results Erbe: 50–60% 60–70% 70–80% McManus: 50–60% 60–70%
Governor before election
Herschel Loveless
Democratic
Elected Governor
Norman Erbe
Republican

The 1960 Iowa gubernatorial election was held on November 8, 1960. Republican nominee Norman A. Erbe defeated Democratic nominee Edward Joseph McManus with 52.14% of the vote.

== Primary elections ==
Primary elections were held on June 6, 1960.

=== Democratic primary ===
==== Candidates ====
- Edward Joseph McManus, incumbent Lieutenant Governor
- Harold Hughes, Chairman of the State Commerce Commission

==== Results ====
Democratic primary results
Party	Candidate	Votes	%
Democratic	Edward Joseph McManus	74,990	61.7
Democratic	Harold Hughes	46,542	38.3
Total votes		121,532	100.00

=== Republican primary ===
==== Candidates ====
- Norman A. Erbe, Attorney General of Iowa
- Jack Schroeder, State Senator
- William H. Nicholas, former Lieutenant Governor

==== Results ====
Republican primary results
Party	Candidate	Votes	%
Republican	Norman A. Erbe	81,869	36.3
Republican	Jack Schroeder	75,599	33.5
Republican	William H. Nicholas	68,037	30.2
Total votes		225,505	100.00

== General election ==
=== Candidates ===
- Norman A. Erbe, Republican
- Edward Joseph McManus, Democratic

=== Results ===
1960 Iowa gubernatorial election
Party	Candidate	Votes	%	±%
Republican	Norman A. Erbe	645,026	52.14%	
Democratic	Edward Joseph McManus	592,063	47.86%	
Majority		52,963		
Turnout		1,237,089		
Republican gain from Democratic		Swing		
