= W. L. Mooty =

American politician, farmer, and lawyer (1906–1992)

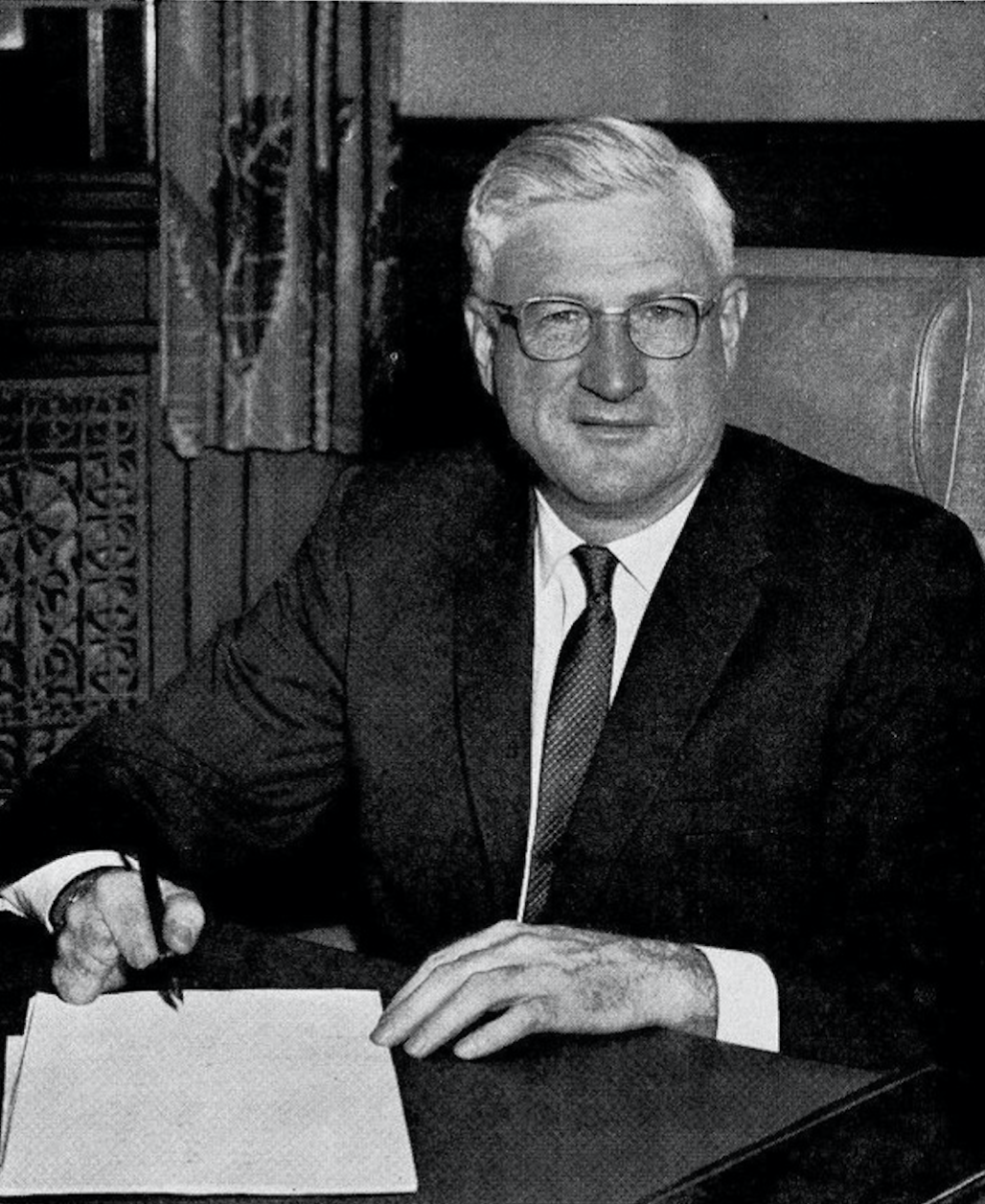

36th Lieutenant Governor of Iowa
- In office January 12, 1961 – January 17, 1965
- Governor: Norman A. Erbe; Harold Hughes
- Preceded by: Edward J. McManus
- Succeeded by: Robert D. Fulton

Member of the Iowa House of Representatives from the 65th district
- In office January 8, 1951 – January 11, 1957

Personal details
- Born: May 23, 1906 Grundy County, Iowa, U.S.
- Died: June 16, 1992 (aged 86)
- Party: Republican
- Profession: Farmer, Lawyer

William Lewis Mooty (May 23, 1906 – June 16, 1992), was an American Republican politician, farmer, and lawyer who served as the Lieutenant Governor of Iowa from 1961 until 1965.

Born in Grundy County, Iowa, Mooty served in the United States Army Air Forces during World War II. Mooty received his bachelor's and law degrees from University of Iowa. He practiced law and managed his farm. Mooty served on the Grundy Center, Iowa city council and in the Iowa House of Representatives. He later served as Lieutenant Governor of Iowa under Norman A. Erbe and Harold E. Hughes.

Party political offices
Preceded by William H. Nicholas	Republican Party nominee for Lieutenant Governor of Iowa; 1958, 1960, 1962, 1964	Succeeded by Max Milo Mills
Political offices
Preceded by Edward J. McManus	Lieutenant Governor of Iowa; 1961–1965	Succeeded by Robert D. Fulton
