= Henry Norman Graven =

American judge (1893–1970)

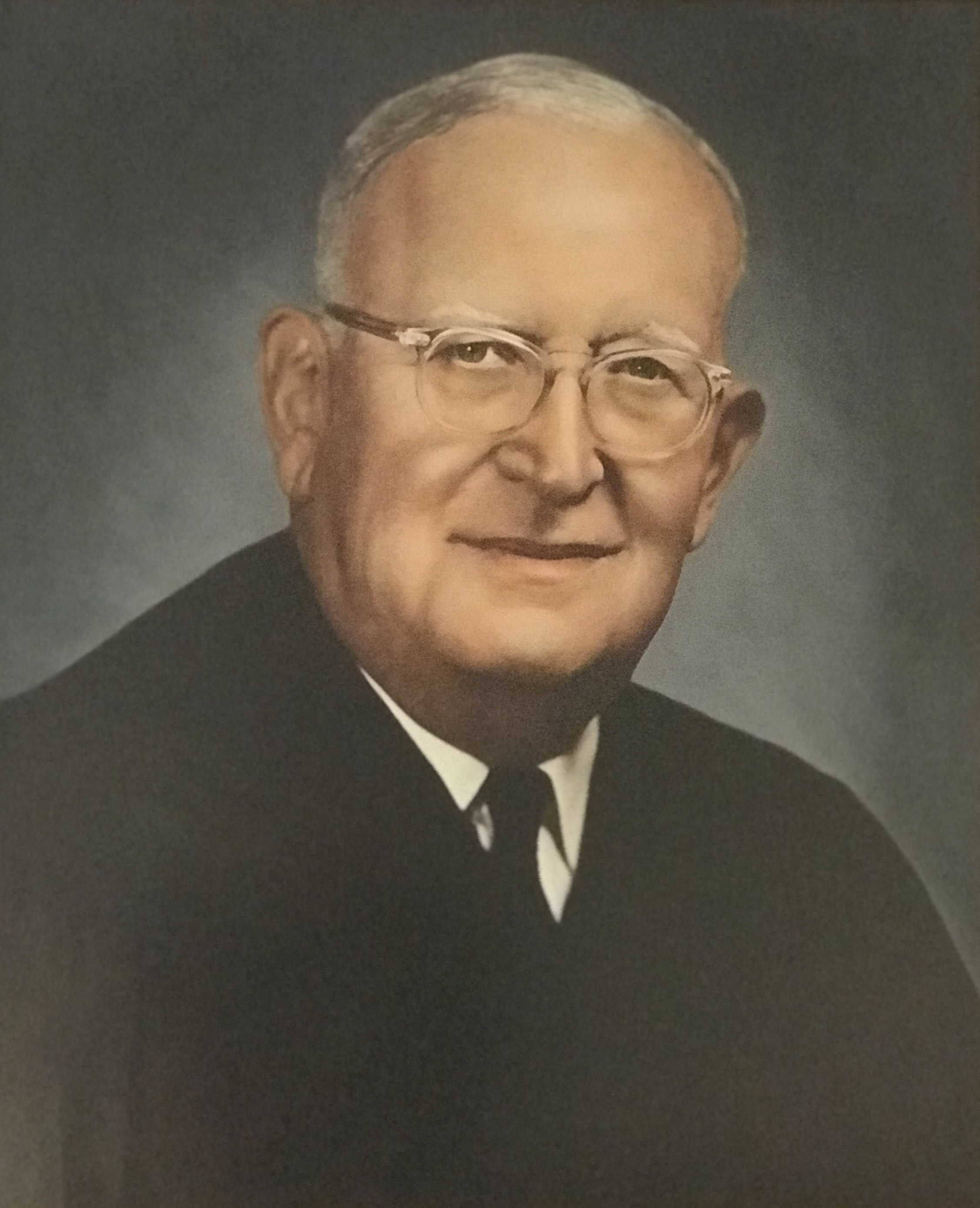
- Graven's court portrait

Senior Judge of the United States District Court for the Northern District of Iowa
- In office August 31, 1961 – February 1, 1970

Chief Judge of the United States District Court for the Northern District of Iowa
- In office 1961
- Preceded by: Office established
- Succeeded by: Edward Joseph McManus

Judge of the United States District Court for the Northern District of Iowa
- In office March 24, 1944 – August 31, 1961
- Appointed by: Franklin D. Roosevelt
- Preceded by: George Cromwell Scott
- Succeeded by: Edward Joseph McManus

Personal details
- Born: Henry Norman Graven; June 1, 1893 St. James, Minnesota, U.S.
- Died: February 1, 1970 (aged 76) San Antonio, Texas, U.S.
- Education: University of Minnesota (A.B.); University of Minnesota Law School (LL.B.)

Henry Norman Graven (June 1, 1893 – February 1, 1970) was a United States district judge of the United States District Court for the Northern District of Iowa.

== Education and career ==
Born in St. James, Minnesota, Graven served as a United States Army combat engineer during World War I. He received an Artium Baccalaureus degree from the University of Minnesota in 1921, and a Bachelor of Laws from the University of Minnesota Law School in 1921. Relocating to Iowa, he was in private practice in Greene, Iowa from 1921 to 1937. From 1936 to 1937, he was a special assistant state attorney general of Iowa and a counsel for the Iowa State Highway Commission. From 1937 to 1944, Graven was a trial court judge of the 12th Judicial District Court of Iowa.

== Federal judicial service ==
Graven was nominated by President Franklin D. Roosevelt on March 3, 1944, to a seat on the United States District Court for the Northern District of Iowa vacated by Judge George Cromwell Scott. He was confirmed by the United States Senate on March 21, 1944, and received his commission on March 24, 1944. He served as Chief Judge in 1961. He assumed senior status on August 31, 1961. His service terminated on February 1, 1970, due to his death in San Antonio, Texas.

== Sources ==
Legal offices
Preceded by George Cromwell Scott	Judge of the United States District Court for the Northern District of Iowa; 1944–1961	Succeeded by Edward Joseph McManus
Preceded by Office established	Chief Judge of the United States District Court for the Northern District of Iowa; 1961	Succeeded by Edward Joseph McManus
