= 1958 Iowa gubernatorial election =

- November 4, 1958
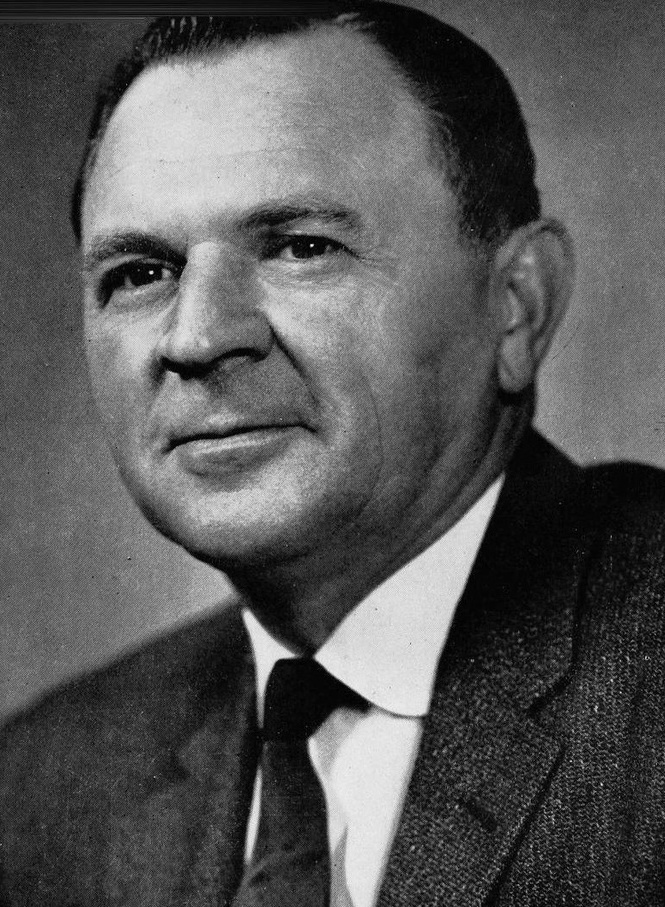

Nominee	Herschel C. Loveless	William G. Murray
Party	Democratic	Republican
Popular vote	465,024	394,071
Percentage	54.13%	45.87%
- County results Loveless: 50–60% 60–70% 70–80% Murray: 50–60% 60–70%
Governor before election
Herschel C. Loveless
Democratic
Elected Governor
Herschel C. Loveless
Democratic

The 1958 Iowa gubernatorial election was held on November 4, 1958. Incumbent Democrat Herschel C. Loveless defeated Republican nominee William G. Murray with 54.13% of the vote.

== Primary elections ==
Primary elections were held on June 2, 1958.

=== Democratic primary ===
==== Candidates ====
- Herschel C. Loveless, incumbent Governor

==== Results ====
Democratic primary results
Party	Candidate	Votes	%
Democratic	Herschel C. Loveless (incumbent)	94,418	100.00
Total votes		94,418	100.00

=== Republican primary ===
==== Candidates ====
- William G. Murray, Iowa State University Economics Professor
- William H. Nicholas, incumbent Lieutenant Governor

==== Results ====
Republican primary results
Party	Candidate	Votes	%
Republican	William G. Murray	112,496	56.6
Republican	William H. Nicholas	86,154	43.4
Total votes		198,650	100.00

== General election ==
=== Candidates ===
- Herschel C. Loveless, Democratic
- William G. Murray, Republican

=== Results ===
1958 Iowa gubernatorial election
Party	Candidate	Votes	%	±%
Democratic	Herschel C. Loveless (incumbent)	465,024	54.13	
Republican	William G. Murray	394,071	45.87	
Majority		70,953		
Turnout		859,095		
Democratic hold		Swing		
