= 1958 Tennessee gubernatorial election =

- November 4, 1958

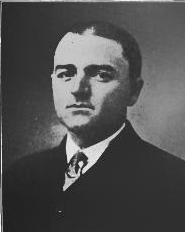

| Nominee | Buford Ellington | Jim Nance McCord | Tom Wall |
| Party | Democratic | Independent | Republican |
| Popular vote | 248,874 | 136,406 | 35,938 |
| Percentage | 57.54% | 31.54% | 8.31% |
- County results Ellington: 30–40% 40–50% 50–60% 60–70% 70–80% 80–90% McCord: 40–50% 50–60%
Governor before election
Frank G. Clement
Democratic
Elected Governor
Buford Ellington
Democratic

The 1958 Tennessee gubernatorial election was held on November 4, 1958, to elect the next governor of Tennessee. Incumbent Democratic governor Frank G. Clement was ineligible to run for re-election, as the Constitution of Tennessee prohibited governors from serving consecutive terms at the time. Democratic nominee Buford Ellington defeated former governor, Independent Jim Nance McCord, and Republican opponent Tom Wall with 57.5% of the vote.

== Primary elections ==
Primary elections were held on August 7, 1958.

=== Democratic primary ===
33.2% of the voting age population participated in the Democratic primary.

==== Candidates ====
- Buford Ellington, State Representative
- Andrew T. "Tip" Taylor
- Edmund Orgill, Mayor of Memphis
- Clifford Allen, State Senator
- Jake Armstrong
- John Hickey
- G. Edward Friar
- Edward Brown

==== Results ====
Democratic primary results
| Party | Candidate | Votes | % |
|---|---|---|---|
| Democratic | Buford Ellington | 213,415 | 31.14% |
| Democratic | Andrew T. "Tip" Taylor | 204,629 | 29.86% |
| Democratic | Edmund Orgill | 204,382 | 29.82% |
| Democratic | Clifford Allen | 56,854 | 8.30% |
| Democratic | Jake Armstrong | 2,936 | 0.43% |
| Democratic | John Hickey | 1,495 | 0.22% |
| Democratic | G. Edward Friar | 1,487 | 0.22% |
| Democratic | Edward Brown | 93 | 0.01% |
| Total votes | | 685,291 | 100.00% |

=== Republican primary ===
1.5% of the voting age population participated in the Republican primary.

== General election ==
=== Candidates ===
Major party candidates

- Buford Ellington, Democratic
- Tom Wall, Republican

Other candidates

- Jim Nance McCord, Independent
- Allen Bell, Independent
- Thomas E. Cook, Independent
- Herbert P. Moore, Independent
- Paul David Warwick, Independent
- Lee R. Foster, Independent
- John Randolph Neal Jr., Independent

=== Results ===
1958 Tennessee gubernatorial election
| Party | Candidate | Votes | % | ±% |
|---|---|---|---|---|
| Democratic | Buford Ellington | 248,874 | 57.54% | |
| Independent | Jim Nance McCord | 136,406 | 31.54% | |
| Republican | Tom Wall | 35,938 | 8.31% | |
| Independent | Allen Bell | 3,024 | 0.70% | |
| Independent | Thomas E. Cook | 2,673 | 0.62% | |
| Independent | Herbert P. Moore | 1,923 | 0.45% | |
| Independent | Paul David Warwick | 1,639 | 0.38% | |
| Independent | Lee R. Foster | 1,605 | 0.37% | |
| Independent | John Randolph Neal Jr. | 453 | 0.11% | |
| | | 17 | 0.00% | |
| Majority | | 212,936 | | |
| Turnout | | 432,545 | | |
| Democratic hold | | Swing | | |

== Works cited ==
- Steed, Robert; Moreland, Laurence; Baker, Tod, eds. (1980). Party Politics in the South. Praeger Publishers. ISBN 0030565863.
