= Norman A. Erbe =

American politician (1919–2000)

Norman Erbe
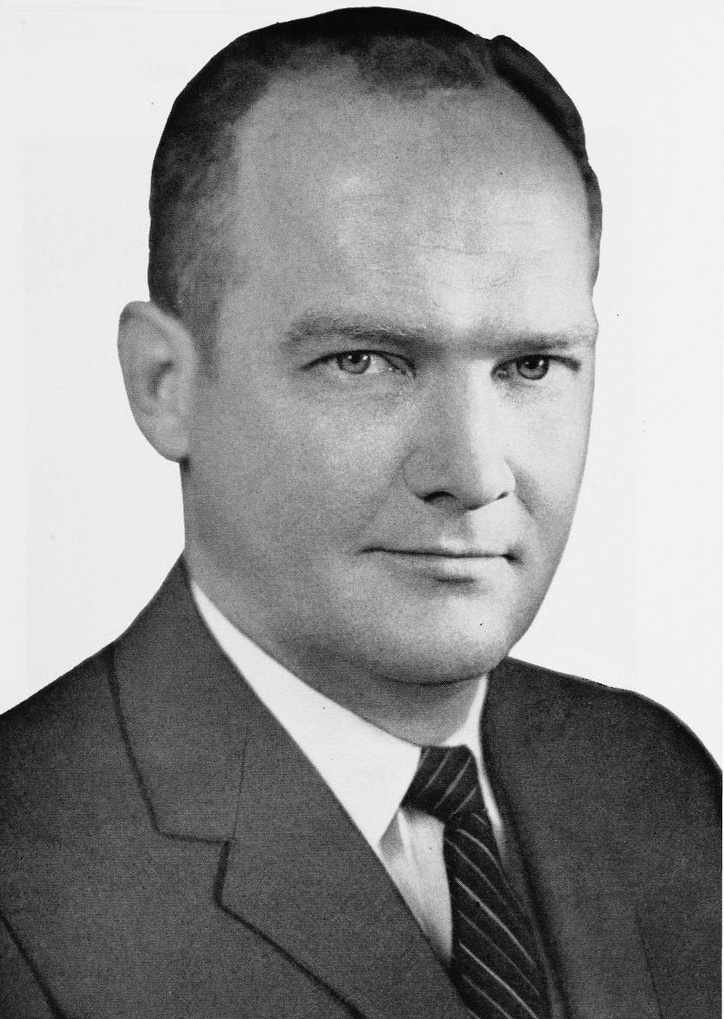

35th Governor of Iowa
- In office January 12, 1961 – January 17, 1963
- Lieutenant: W. L. Mooty
- Preceded by: Herschel C. Loveless
- Succeeded by: Harold Hughes

26th Attorney General of Iowa
- In office 1957–1961
- Governor: Herschel C. Loveless
- Preceded by: Dayton Countryman
- Succeeded by: Evan Hultman

Assistant Attorney General of Iowa
- In office 1955–1957

Boone County Attorney
- In office 1952–1952

Personal details
- Born: Norman Arthur Erbe; October 25, 1919 Boone, Iowa, U.S.
- Died: June 8, 2000 (aged 80) Boone, Iowa, U.S.
- Party: Republican
- Spouse: Jacqueline Doran (m. 1941)
- Children: 3

Military service
- Branch: United States Army; United States Army Air Force; Iowa National Guard
- Years of service: 1941-1962
- Rank: Colonel
- Unit: Eighth Air Corps (Army Air Force); Judge Advocate's Corps (Iowa National Guard)
- Battles/wars: World War II; D-Day Invasion
- Awards: Distinguished Flying Cross

Norman Arthur Erbe (October 25, 1919 – June 8, 2000) was an American attorney and politician who served as the 35th governor of Iowa, holding the position from 1961 to 1963.

== Early life ==
He was born in Boone, Iowa in 1919, the last of 6 children of Rev. Otto L. Erbe and Louise J. Sestner. He graduated from Boone High School in 1937.

He served as a Second Lieutenant in the United States Army from 1941 to 1945. He then transferred to the United States Army Air Forces as a pilot, spending the rest of World War II as a pilot, flying 32 bomber missions over Germany and flew during the D-Day invasion. He was a pilot of the B-17. He received the Distinguished Flying Cross and 4 air medals. He then served for 17 years in the Judge Advocate Corps in the Iowa National Guard, rising to be a Colonel.

After the war, he studied at the University of Iowa, obtaining a law degree in 1947.

Erbe married Jacqueline Doran on September 27, 1942 and had 3 daughters.

== Political career ==
=== Local politics ===
In 1952, he was appointed for two months to be the Boone County Attorney. He was Assistant Attorney General attached to the Iowa Highway Commission. During this time he co-authored, with Daniel T. Flores, the special counsel to the Iowa Highway Commission, Iowa Highway, Road and Street Laws (1956) and Iowa Drainage Laws (1957).

=== Iowa Attorney General ===
He entered state politics, first serving as Assistant Attorney General of Iowa from 1955 to 1957 and then serving as Iowa Attorney General from 1957 to 1961. In 1959, he removed 42 books off of shelves due to their "filthy literature".

=== Iowa Governor ===
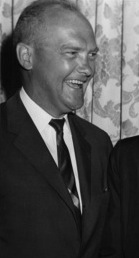
Erbe in 1962

In 1960, he won the Iowa gubernatorial race, against Lt. Governor Edward McManus, winning by 52,963 votes. In his inaugural address, he suggested in his State of the State, that the 99 county attorneys be consolidated into 21 judicial attorneys for the 21 judicial districts in Iowa and that the attorneys serve for 4 years instead of 2.

In 1961, during his term, he increased funding for educational programs, and authorized prison improvements, and approved a federal low rental housing plan, and signed a bill that permitted Iowa to join the Kerr Mills medical program. Erbe presided over the last two state executions in Iowa, that of Charles Brown and Charles Kelley. In a 1995 interview, Erbe said that while he had no second thoughts over the executions, he did not believe capital punishment was a deterrent. He maintained a $118 million surplus in that was in the treasury. He established the Iowa National Guard Military Academy and the first tourist program in Iowa.

In the 1962 election he lost re-election to Harold E. Hughes by 41,944 votes.

He hosted the world premiere of the motion picture Meredith Willson's The Music Man in Mason City, Iowa during the North Iowa Band Festival on June 19, 1962 in the hometown of Meredith Willson.

== Later life ==
In 1974, he received the Secretary of Transportation Outstanding Achievement Medal for his service to the US Government.

From 1971 to 1979, he assisted the White House in getting expedited funding for Alaska, the Pacific Northwest, and the Great Lakes.

He served on the boards of the State Historical Society of Iowa and the Boone County Historical Society.

After leaving politics, he served as Executive Vice-President of the Associated Builders and Contractors in 1979. He published his memoirs, Ringside at the Fireworks, in 1997, specifically talking about his military service.

He died on June 8, 2000 of congestive heart failure. He is buried in the Linwood Park cemetery in Boone, Iowa.

== See also ==
- List of Iowa attorneys general
- List of governors of Iowa

Party political offices
Preceded by Dayton Countryman	Republican nominee for Attorney General of Iowa; 1956, 1958	Succeeded by Evan Hultman
Preceded by William G. Murray	Republican nominee Governor of Iowa; 1960, 1962	Succeeded by Evan Hultman
Legal offices
Preceded by Dayton Countryman	Attorney General of Iowa; 1957 – 1961	Succeeded by Evan Hultman
Political offices
Preceded by Herschel C. Loveless	Governor of Iowa; January 12, 1961 – January 17, 1963	Succeeded by Harold Hughes
