= Kenneth A. Evans =

American businessman and politician (1898–1970)

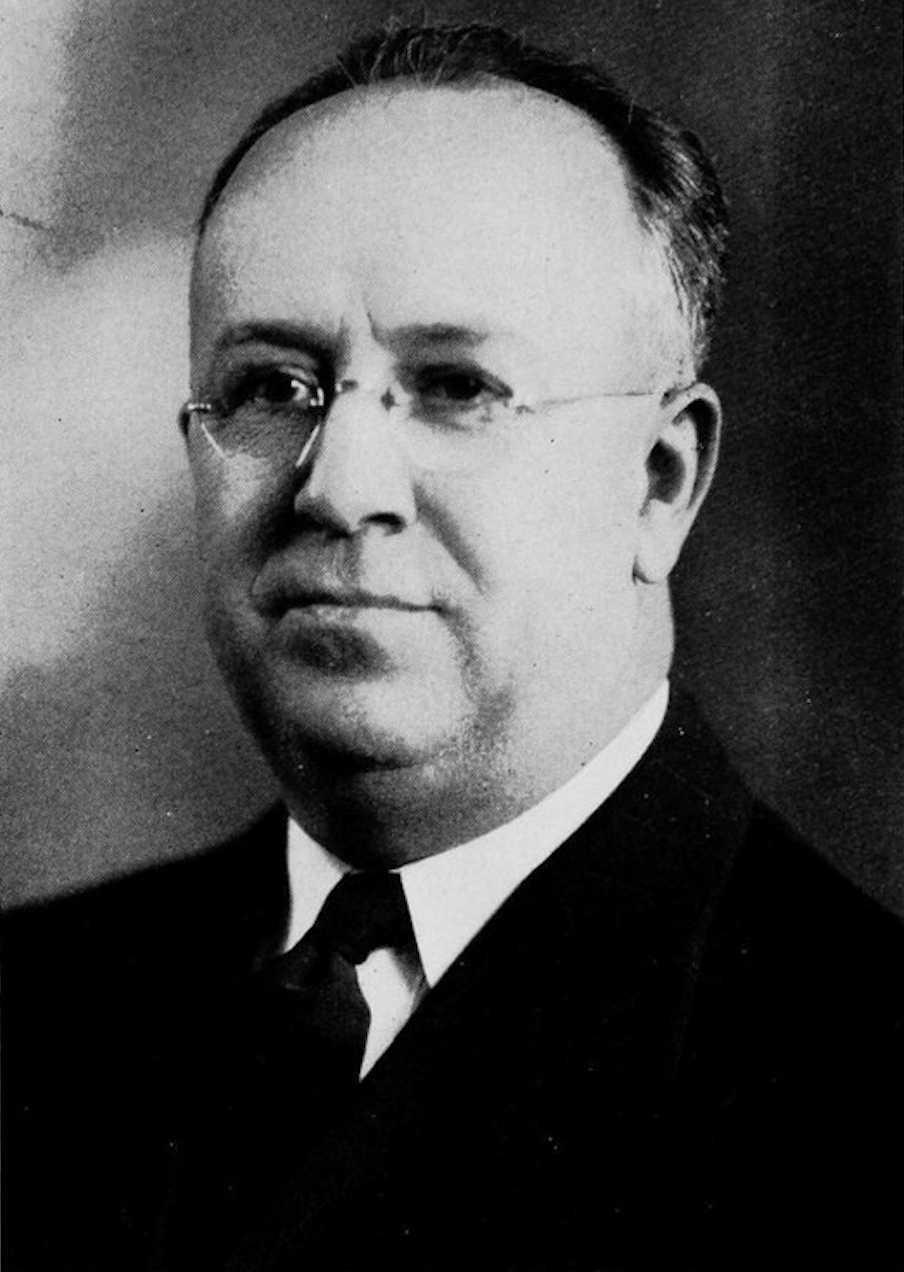
- Evans in 1949

31st Lieutenant Governor of Iowa
- In office 1945–1951
- Governor: Robert D. Blue; William S. Beardsley
- Preceded by: Robert D. Blue
- Succeeded by: William H. Nicholas

Member of the Iowa Senate
- In office January 11, 1937 – January 9, 1945
- Constituency: 8th District

Personal details
- Born: November 9, 1898 Emerson, Iowa
- Died: December 11, 1970 (aged 72) Red Oak, Iowa

Kenneth A. Evans (November 9, 1898 – December 11, 1970) was an American Republican businessman and politician.

Born in Emerson, Iowa, Evans was a World War I veteran and a farm manager. He served on the Emerson City Council. He served in the Iowa State Senate 1937-1945 and then Lieutenant Governor of Iowa 1945-1951 serving under Governors Robert D. Blue and William S. Beardsley. He died in Red Oak, Iowa.

== Notes ==
Political offices
| Preceded by Robert D. Blue | Lieutenant Governor of Iowa; 1945–1951 | Succeeded by William H. Nicholas |
