= 1958 Arkansas gubernatorial election =

- November 4, 1958
- Turnout: 15.02%
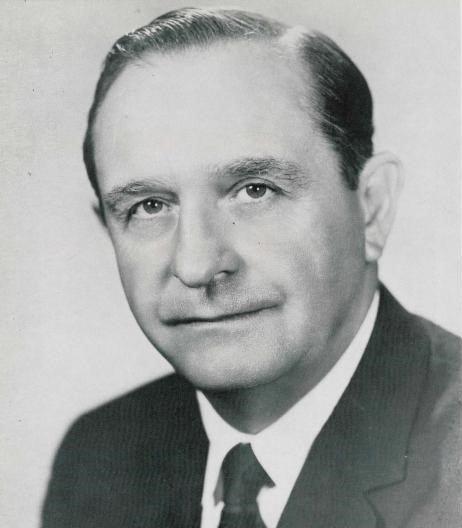

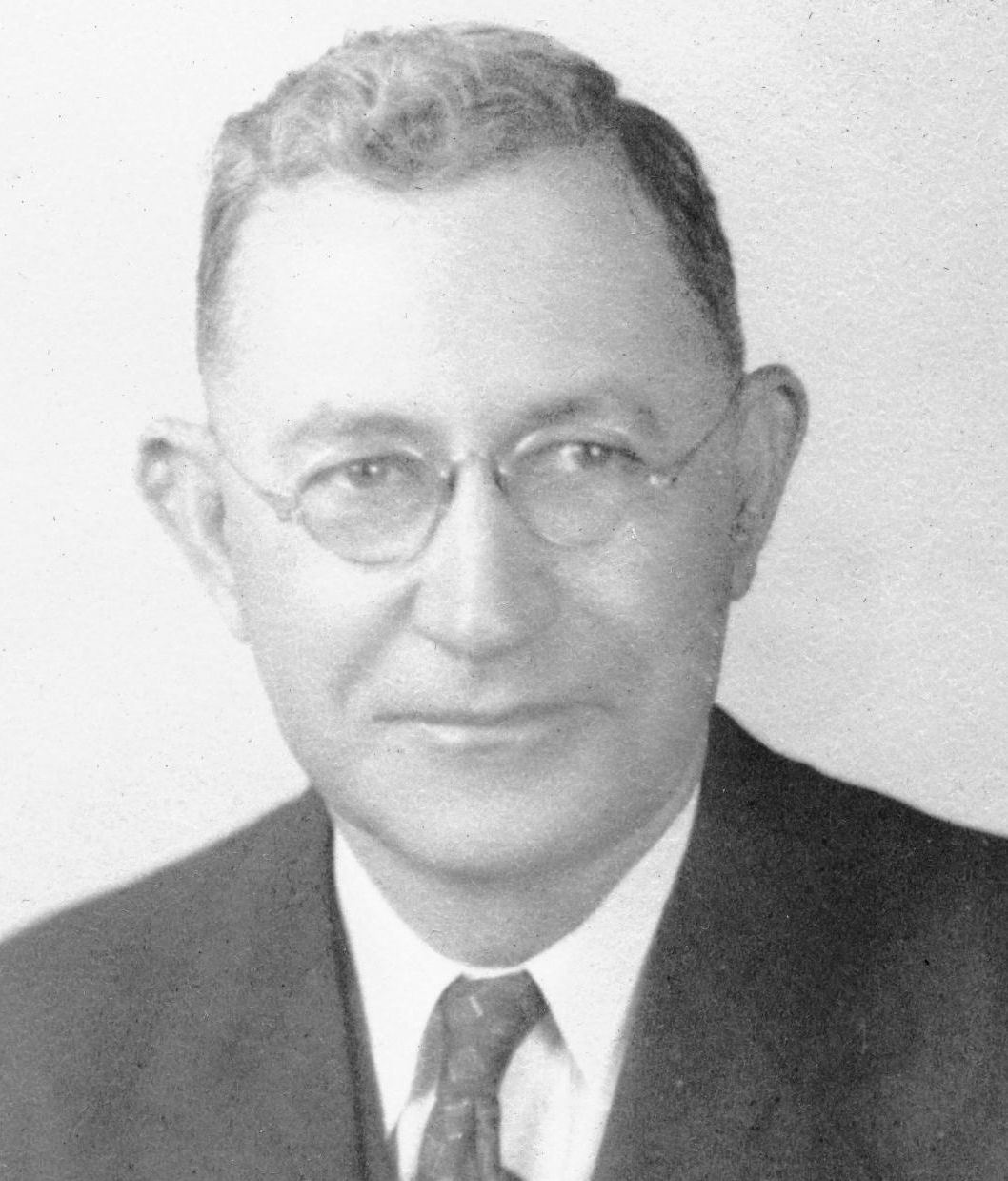
Nominee	Orval Faubus	George W. Johnson
Party	Democratic	Republican
Popular vote	236,598	50,288
Percentage	82.47%	17.53%
- County results Faubus: 60–70% 70–80% 80–90% >90%
Governor before election
Orval Faubus
Democratic
Elected Governor
Orval Faubus
Democratic

The 1958 Arkansas gubernatorial election was held on November 4, 1958.

Incumbent Democratic Governor Orval Faubus won election to an unprecedented third term, defeating Republican nominee George W. Johnson with 82.47% of the vote. Faubus surged in popularity after denying the Little Rock Nine entrance to Central High School with the use of the Arkansas National Guard on September 4, 1957.

== Primary elections ==
Primary elections were held on July 29, 1958. By winning over 50% of the vote, Faubus and Johnson avoided run-offs which would have been held on August 12, 1958. Prior to 1958, Republicans had nominated their candidates via convention. It was the first time a contested statewide Republican primary had ever been held in Arkansas, yet due to state law that required the parties to pay the full cost of primary elections, the GOP was only able to hold its primary in nine counties. It was not until 1995 that the legislature, facing a lawsuit from the Republicans, passed a bill for the state to pay the cost of the primaries, which was signed by Democratic Governor Jim Guy Tucker.

=== Democratic primary ===
==== Candidates ====
- Orval Faubus, incumbent Governor
- Chris Finkbeiner, businessman
- Lee Ward, judge

==== Results ====
Democratic primary results
Party	Candidate	Votes	%
Democratic	Orval Faubus (incumbent)	264,346	68.86
Democratic	Chris Finkbeiner	60,173	15.67
Democratic	Lee Ward	59,385	15.47
Total votes		383,904	100.00

=== Republican primary ===
==== Candidates ====
- George W. Johnson, attorney
- Donald D. Layne, civil engineer

==== Results ====
Republican primary results
Party	Candidate	Votes	%
Republican	George W. Johnson	3,147	71.20
Republican	Donald D. Layne	1,273	28.80
Total votes		4,420	100.00

== General election ==
=== Candidates ===
- Orval Faubus, Democratic
- George W. Johnson, Republican

George W. Johnson, an attorney in Greenwood, Sebastian County, deliberately abandoned the race in September 1958. He traveled to his son's home in Isle, Minnesota. He told his family, "Mr. Faubus is a fine man and I support him whole-heartedly." He genuinely and naively believed that blacks were intellectually deficient and needed their own schools.

=== Results ===
1958 Arkansas gubernatorial election
Party	Candidate	Votes	%	±%
Democratic	Orval Faubus (incumbent)	236,598	82.47%	+1.82%
Republican	George W. Johnson	50,288	17.53%	−1.82%
Majority		186,310	64.94%	
Turnout		286,886	100.00%	
Democratic hold		Swing		

== Bibliography ==
- Gubernatorial Elections, 1787-1997. Washington, D.C.: Congressional Quarterly Inc. 1998. ISBN 1-56802-396-0.
