= 1960 Arkansas gubernatorial election =

- November 8, 1960
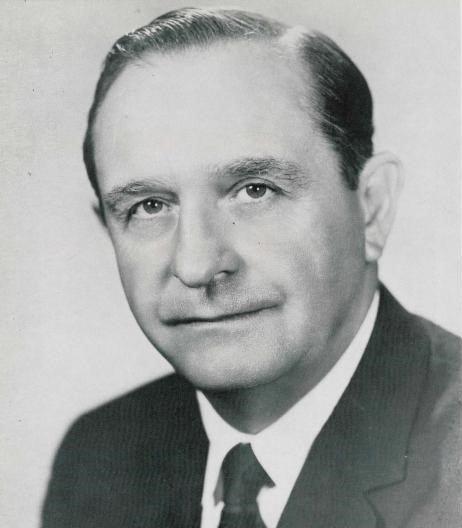

| Nominee | Orval Faubus | Henry M. Britt |
| Party | Democratic | Republican |
| Popular vote | 292,064 | 129,921 |
| Percentage | 69.21% | 30.79% |
Governor before election
Orval Faubus
Democratic
Elected Governor
Orval Faubus
Democratic

The 1960 Arkansas gubernatorial election was held on November 8, 1960.

Incumbent Democratic Governor Orval Faubus won election to a fourth term, defeating Republican nominee Henry M. Britt with 69.21% of the vote.

That year, Faubus simultaneously ran for president under the white supremacist National States' Rights Party.

== Primary elections ==
Primary elections were held on July 26, 1960. By winning over 50% of the vote, Faubus avoided a run-off which would have been held on August 9, 1960.

=== Democratic primary ===
==== Candidates ====
- Bruce Bennett, incumbent Attorney General of Arkansas
- Orval Faubus, incumbent Governor
- Joe C. Hardin, businessman, Farm Bureau President, and former natural gas company executive
- Hal Millsap, supermarket owner
- Rev. H. E. Williams, president of Southern Baptist College, Walnut Ridge

==== Results ====
Democratic primary results
| Party | Candidate | Votes | % |
|---|---|---|---|
| Democratic | Orval Faubus (incumbent) | 238,997 | 58.75 |
| Democratic | Joe C. Hardin | 66,499 | 16.35 |
| Democratic | Bruce Bennett | 58,400 | 14.36 |
| Democratic | H. E. Williams | 33,374 | 8.20 |
| Democratic | Hal Millsap | 9,547 | 2.35 |
| Total votes | | 406,817 | 100.00 |

=== Republican primary ===
==== Candidates ====
- Henry M. Britt, attorney

==== Results ====
Republican primary results
| Party | Candidate | Votes | % |
|---|---|---|---|
| Republican | Henry M. Britt | | unopposed |

== General election ==
=== Candidates ===
- Orval Faubus, Democratic
- Henry M. Britt, Republican

=== Results ===
1960 Arkansas gubernatorial election
| Party | Candidate | Votes | % | ±% |
|---|---|---|---|---|
| Democratic | Orval Faubus (incumbent) | 292,064 | 69.21% | −13.26% |
| Republican | Henry M. Britt | 129,921 | 30.79% | +13.26% |
| Majority | | 162,143 | 38.42% | |
| Turnout | | 421,985 | 100.00% | |
| Democratic hold | | Swing | | |

== Bibliography ==
- Gubernatorial Elections, 1787-1997. Washington, D.C.: Congressional Quarterly Inc. 1998. ISBN 1-56802-396-0.
