= Edward J. McManus =

American judge (1920–2017)

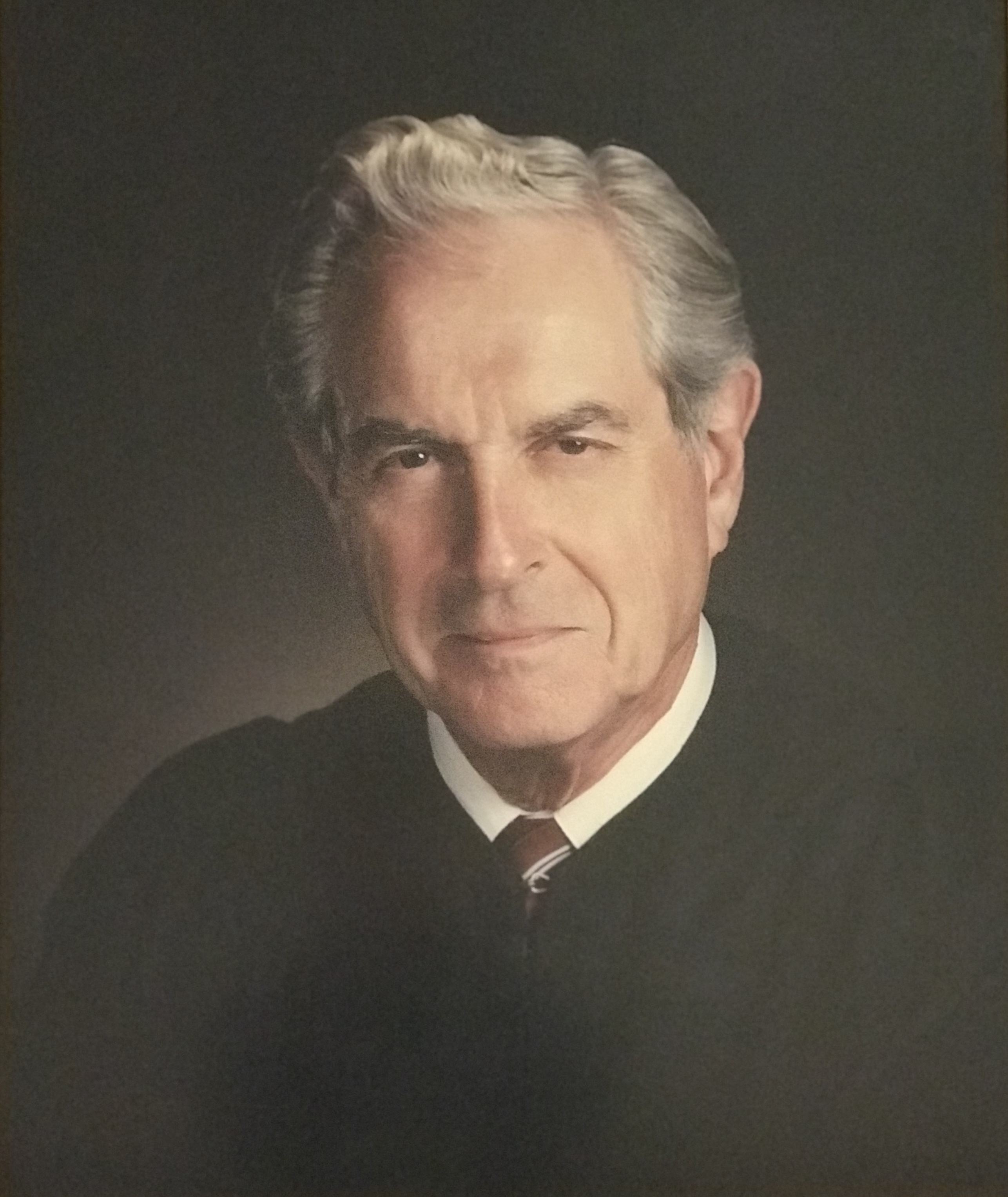
- McManus's court portrait

Senior Judge of the United States District Court for the Northern District of Iowa
- In office February 9, 1985 – March 20, 2017

Chief Judge of the United States District Court for the Northern District of Iowa
- In office 1962–1985
- Preceded by: Henry Norman Graven
- Succeeded by: Donald E. O'Brien

Judge of the United States District Court for the Northern District of Iowa
- In office July 16, 1962 – February 9, 1985
- Appointed by: John F. Kennedy
- Preceded by: Henry Norman Graven
- Succeeded by: David R. Hansen

35th Lieutenant Governor of Iowa
- In office January 15, 1959 – January 12, 1961
- Governor: Herschel C. Loveless
- Preceded by: William H. Nicholas
- Succeeded by: W. L. Mooty

Member of the Iowa Senate
- In office January 3, 1955 – January 11, 1959

City Attorney of Keokuk
- In office 1946–1955

Personal details
- Born: Edward Joseph McManus; February 9, 1920 Keokuk, Iowa, U.S.
- Died: March 20, 2017 (aged 97) Cedar Rapids, Iowa, U.S.
- Party: Democratic
- Spouse: Sally Hassett (m.1948)
- Education: University of Iowa (B.A.); University of Iowa College of Law (J.D.)

Edward Joseph McManus (February 9, 1920 – March 20, 2017) served as the lieutenant governor of Iowa and served as a United States district judge of the United States District Court for the Northern District of Iowa for over 50 years.

== Education and career ==
Born in Keokuk, Iowa, McManus received a Bachelor of Arts degree from the University of Iowa in 1940 and a Juris Doctor from the University of Iowa College of Law in 1942. He was a United States Naval Reserve Lieutenant from 1942 to 1946. He was in private practice in Keokuk from 1946 to 1962, serving as Keokuk City Attorney for the first nine of those years. He was elected to the Iowa Senate as a Democrat in 1954, serving from 1955 to 1959. In 1958 he was elected as the Lieutenant Governor of Iowa, a position he held from 1959 to 1961 serving under Governor Herschel C. Loveless. He was the Democratic nominee for Governor of Iowa in 1960, losing to Norman A. Erbe in November 1960. He was President of the Coca-Cola Bottling Company in Keokuk from 1955 to 1962 and President of 1001 Corporation in Keokuk from 1960 to 1962.

== Federal judicial service ==
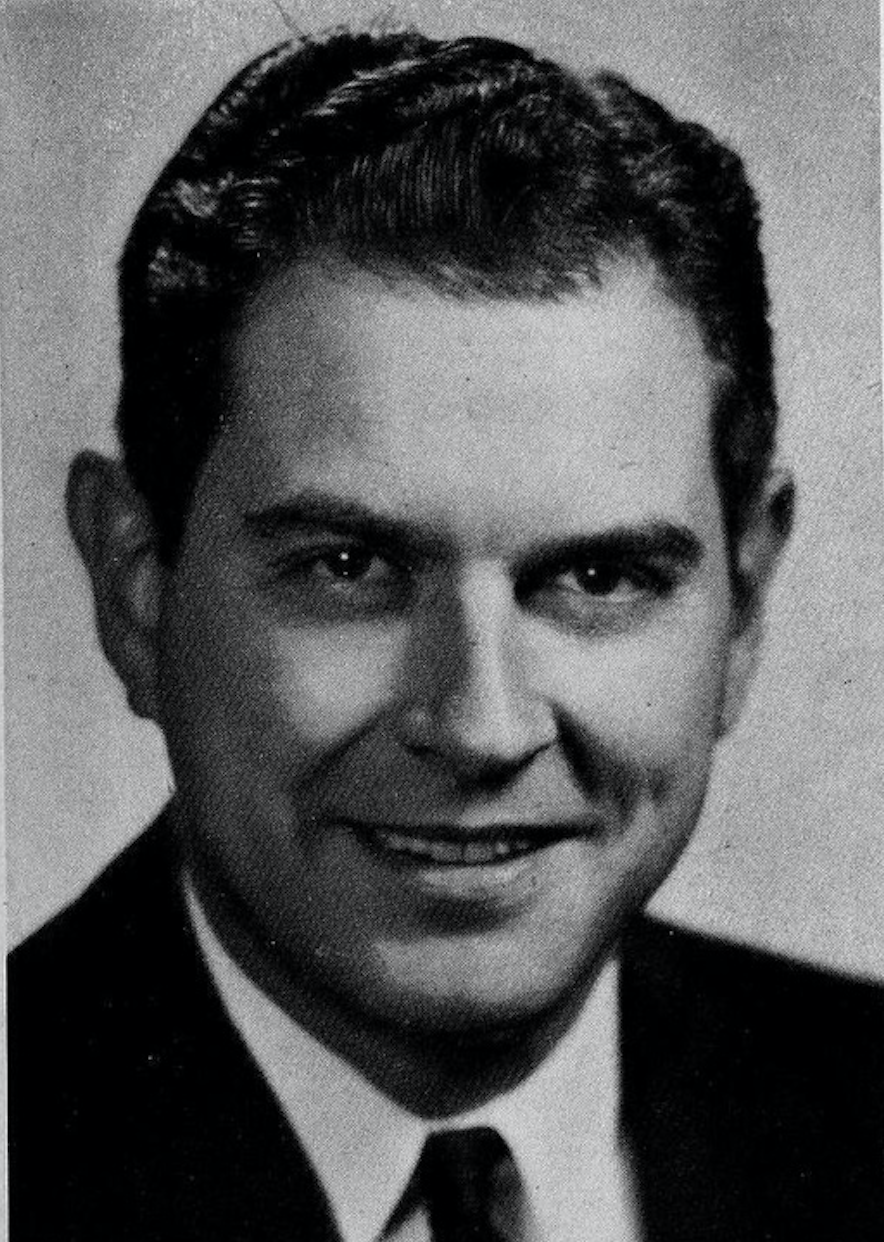
McManus in the 1950s

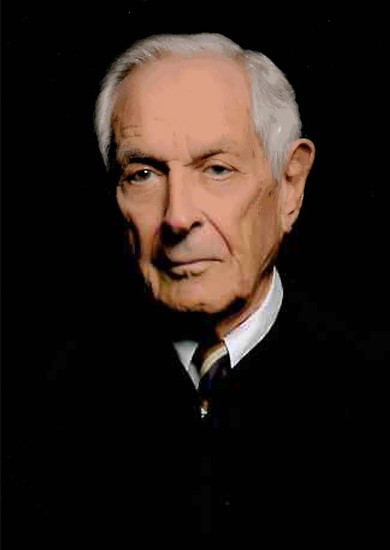
McManus in the 1990s

McManus was nominated by President John F. Kennedy on June 23, 1962 to a seat on the United States District Court for the Northern District of Iowa vacated when Judge Henry N. Graven assumed senior status. He was confirmed by the United States Senate on July 13, 1962, and received his commission on July 16, 1962. He had not lived in the Northern District until this appointment, and thus needed to relocate from Keokuk (in Iowa's far southeastern county) to Cedar Rapids, Iowa. He served as Chief Judge from 1962 to 1985. He assumed senior status on February 9, 1985. No federal district court judge in Iowa history served for a longer period on the bench than McManus. He died at the age of 97 on March 20, 2017, in Cedar Rapids; at the time of his death, McManus was the longest serving living federal judge.

== See also ==
- List of United States federal judges by longevity of service

== Sources ==
Party political offices
Preceded by George E. O'Malley	Democratic nominee for Lieutenant Governor of Iowa; 1958	Succeeded by John R. Hanson
Preceded by Herschel C. Loveless	Democratic nominee for Governor of Iowa; 1960	Succeeded by Harold Hughes
Political offices
Preceded by William H. Nicholas	Lieutenant Governor of Iowa; 1959–1961	Succeeded by W. L. Mooty
Legal offices
Preceded by Henry Norman Graven	Judge of the United States District Court for the Northern District of Iowa; 1962–1985	Succeeded by David R. Hansen
Preceded by Henry Norman Graven	Chief Judge of the United States District Court for the Northern District of Iowa; 1962–1985	Succeeded by Donald E. O'Brien
