= 1956 Iowa gubernatorial election =

- November 6, 1956
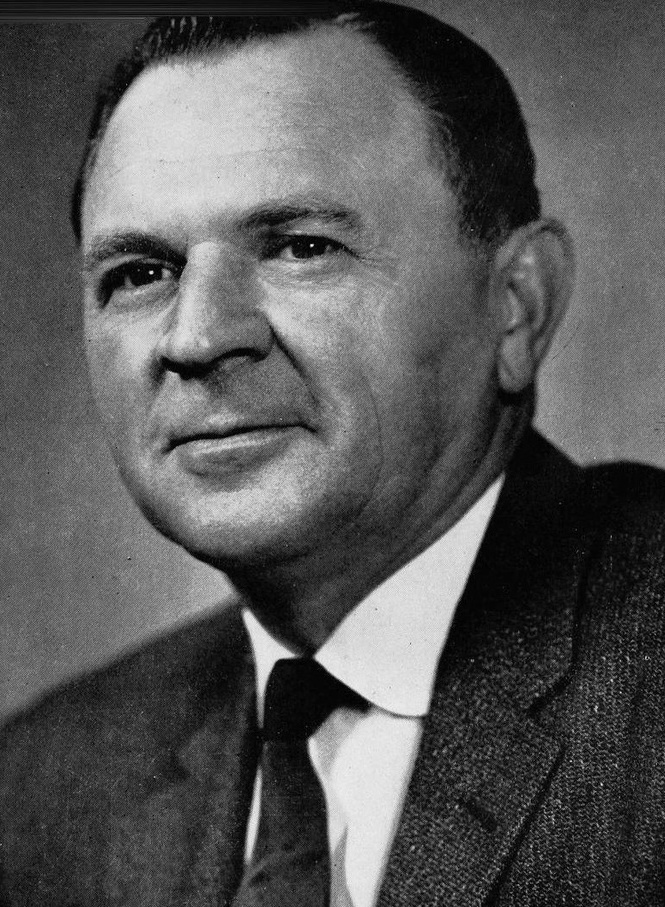

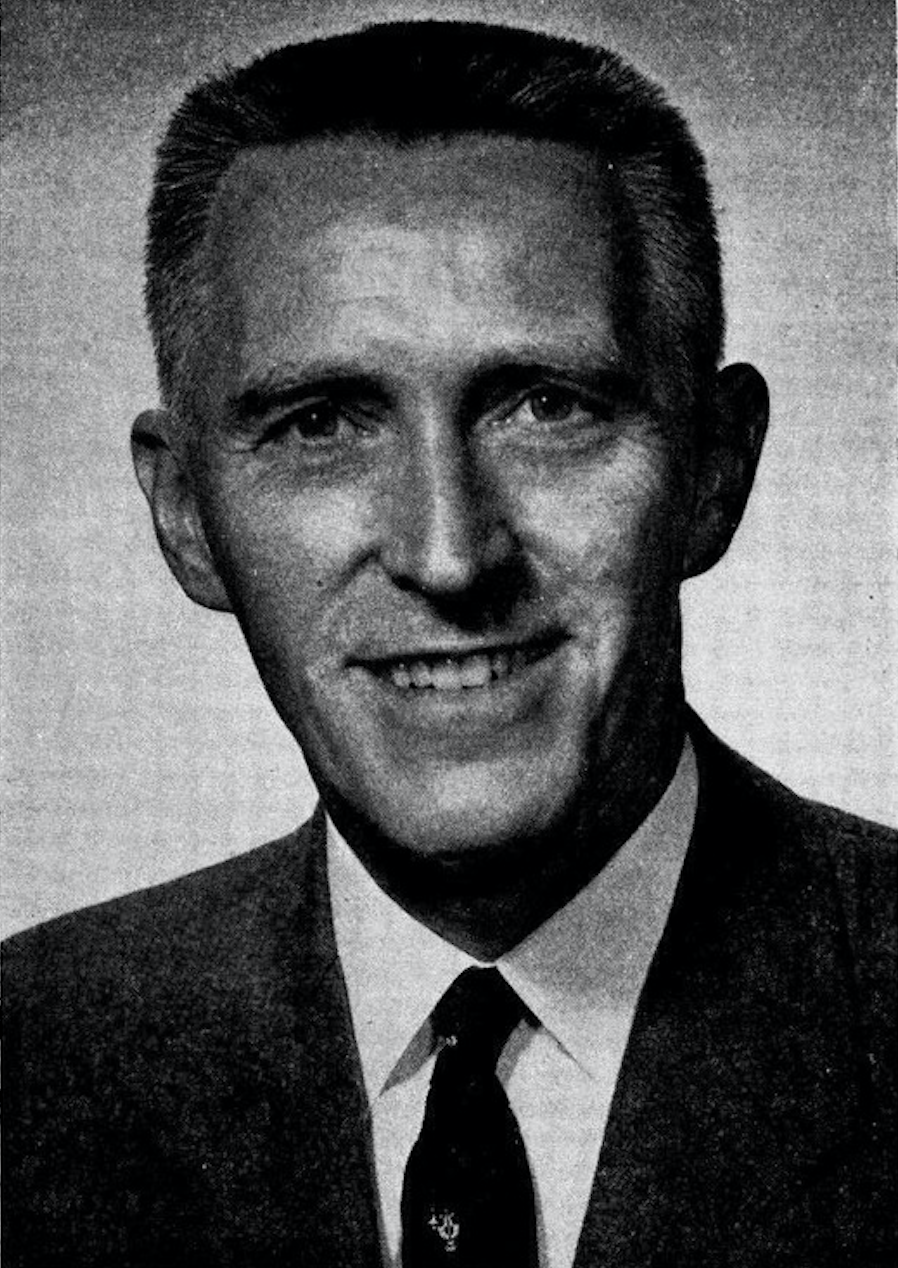
| Nominee | Herschel C. Loveless | Leo Hoegh |
| Party | Democratic | Republican |
| Popular vote | 616,852 | 587,383 |
| Percentage | 51.22% | 48.78% |
- County results Loveless: 50–60% 60–70% Hoegh: 50–60% 60–70%
Governor before election
Leo Hoegh
Republican
Elected Governor
Herschel C. Loveless
Democratic

The 1956 Iowa gubernatorial election was held on November 6, 1956. Democratic nominee Herschel C. Loveless defeated incumbent Republican Leo Hoegh with 51.22% of the vote.

== Primary elections ==
Primary elections were held on June 4, 1956.

=== Democratic primary ===
==== Candidates ====
- Herschel C. Loveless, former Mayor of Ottumwa
- Lawrence E. Plummer

==== Results ====
Democratic primary results
| Party | Candidate | Votes | % |
|---|---|---|---|
| Democratic | Herschel C. Loveless | 77,206 | 70.0 |
| Democratic | Lawrence E. Plummer | 33,103 | 30.0 |
| Total votes | | 110,309 | 100.00 |

=== Republican primary ===
==== Candidates ====
- Leo Hoegh, incumbent Governor

==== Results ====
Republican primary results
| Party | Candidate | Votes | % |
|---|---|---|---|
| Republican | Leo Hoegh (incumbent) | 188,290 | 100.00 |
| Total votes | | 188,290 | 100.00 |

== General election ==
=== Candidates ===
- Herschel C. Loveless, Democratic
- Leo Hoegh, Republican

=== Results ===
1956 Iowa gubernatorial election
| Party | Candidate | Votes | % | ±% |
|---|---|---|---|---|
| Democratic | Herschel C. Loveless | 616,852 | 51.22% | |
| Republican | Leo Hoegh (incumbent) | 587,383 | 48.78% | |
| Majority | | 29,469 | | |
| Turnout | | 1,204,235 | | |
| Democratic gain from Republican | | Swing | | |
