= William H. Nicholas =

American politician (1892–1984)

William Nicholas
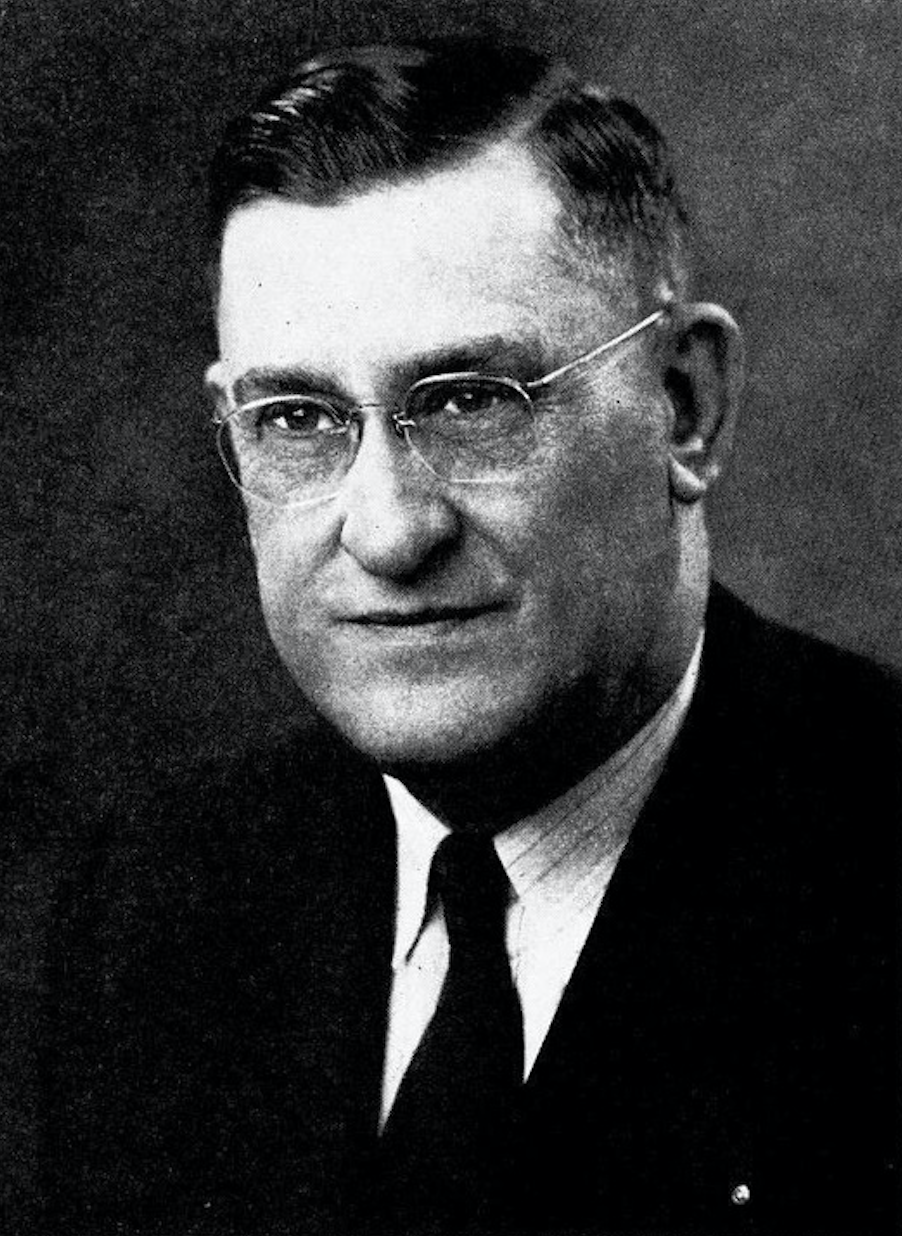

32nd and 34th Lieutenant Governor of Iowa
- In office 1957 – January 15, 1959
- Governor: Herschel C. Loveless
- Preceded by: Leo Elthon
- Succeeded by: Edward J. McManus
- In office 1951–1953
- Governor: William S. Beardsley
- Preceded by: Kenneth A. Evans
- Succeeded by: Leo Elthon

Member of the Iowa House of Representatives
- In office 1946–1948

Personal details
- Born: October 10, 1892 Butler County, Iowa, U.S.
- Died: August 13, 1984 (aged 91)
- Children: 3

Military service
- Branch/service: United States Navy
- Battles/wars: World War I

William H. Nicholas (October 10, 1892 – August 13, 1984) was an American politician who served twice as the Lieutenant Governor of Iowa.

== Early life and education ==
Born in Butler County, Iowa to William A. Nicholas and Elizabeth H. Nicholas, Nicholas raised turkeys in Cerro Gordo County, Iowa and served in the United States Navy during World War I.

== Career ==
Nicholas served as a member of the Iowa House of Representatives from 1946 to 1948. Later, he served as the 34th Lieutenant Governor of Iowa from 1951 to 1953 serving under Governor William S. Beardsley and from 1957 to 1959, serving under Governor Herschel C. Loveless. He died in Mason City, Iowa. Nicholas was a Freemason. From 1959 to 1963, Nicholas served on the Iowa Highway Commission.

== Personal life ==
Nicholas married Viola Folkers of Allison, Iowa in 1922. He had three children.

== Notes ==
Party political offices
Preceded by Kenneth A. Evans	Republican Party nominee for Lieutenant Governor of Iowa; 1950	Succeeded by Leo Elthon
Preceded by Leo Elthon	Republican Party nominee for Lieutenant Governor of Iowa; 1956	Succeeded by W. L. Mooty
Political offices
Preceded by Kenneth A. Evans	Lieutenant Governor of Iowa; 1951–1953	Succeeded by Leo Elthon
Preceded by Leo Elthon	Lieutenant Governor of Iowa; 1957–1959	Succeeded by Edward J. McManus
