= Herschel C. Loveless =

American politician (1911–1989)

Herschel Loveless
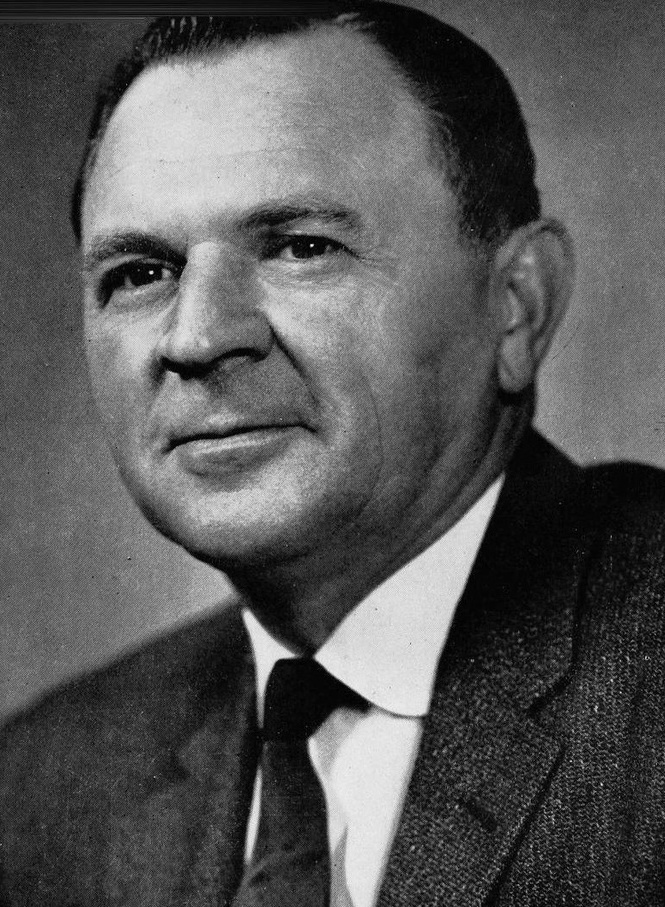

34th Governor of Iowa
- In office January 17, 1957 – January 12, 1961
- Lieutenant: William H. Nicholas; Edward J. McManus
- Preceded by: Leo Hoegh
- Succeeded by: Norman A. Erbe

Mayor of Ottumwa
- In office 1949–1953

Personal details
- Born: Herschel Cellel Loveless; May 5, 1911 Hedrick, Iowa, U.S.
- Died: May 4, 1989 (aged 77) Winchester, Virginia, U.S.
- Resting place: Ottumwa Cemetery; Ottumwa, Iowa
- Party: Democratic
- Spouse: Amelia R. Howard (m. 1933)
- Children: 2

Herschel Cellel Loveless (May 5, 1911 – May 4, 1989) was an American politician who served as the 34th governor of Iowa, from 1957 to 1961.

== Early life ==
Loveless was born in Hedrick, Iowa. Loveless graduated from Ottumwa High School in 1927. He then joined Milwaukee, St. Paul and Pacific Railroad and later joined John Morrell Company as a turbine operator. For two years, from 1947 to 1949, he was the superintendent of streets in Ottumwa.

On October 1, 1933, he married Amelia Howard, with whom he had two children.

== Political career ==
=== Mayoralty 1949-1953 ===
Loveless served as mayor of Ottumwa from 1949 until 1953. During his tenure, he helped created sewer and river wall with the Des Moines River. He established a youth center and modernized Ottumwa's municipal codes.

=== Early campaigns ===
In 1952, Loveless ran for Governor of Iowa. He won the Democratic primary against Otha Wearin, but lost the general election by 50,717 votes against William S. Beardsley.

Two years later, he ran unsuccessfully to represent Iowa's 4th congressional district in the U.S. House, losing to incumbent Karl M. LeCompte.

== Governorship (1957-1961) ==
Loveless ran again for the governorship in 1956. He won the Democratic primary against Lawrence E. Palmer, then defeated incumbent Governor Leo Hoegh in the general election by 29,469 votes. He became only the fourth Democrat since the Civil War to serve as Iowa's governor.

He won re-election in 1958 by an increased margin of 70,953 votes, and carried 66 of the state's 99 counties. His ties to Iowa's growing labor movement and the state's urbanization helped to secure his victories in 1956 and 1958.

During Loveless's two terms as governor, he oversaw the redistricting of public schools into districts and the establishment of a mental health fund. He also worked to raise workmen’s compensation and unemployment compensation benefits, as well as the institution of a teacher’s minimum monthly pension. During his term, the state treasurer also gained authorization of the state treasurer to collect interest on inactive state funds. Loveless vetoed an extension of the two and half percent sales tax. He was considered less militant than his opponents. During his years as governor, Loveless focused on issues such as flood control, mental health, and social services. He also promoted reapportionment to help redress the imbalance in rural-versus-urban representation in the state legislature. Loveless helped to align Iowa's Democratic Party more closely with its national counterpart.

He also secured federal funds from the Eisenhower Administration to dam Lake Red Rock and Saylorville Lake. He urged the Iowa General Assembly to approve flood control measures on the Des Moines River. In 1961, at the end of his tenure, the state treasury had a surplus of $50 million.

== Post governorship ==
In 1960, as his term as governor was ending, Loveless ran in the U.S. Senate election to succeed Republican Thomas E. Martin, who was retiring from the Senate. He lost in a close race against Republican Jack Miller, a state senator.

In 1961, Loveless was appointed to by President John F. Kennedy to the Federal Renegotiation Board and he stayed on the board until 1969. In 1969, he became a vice president for government affairs for the Chromalloy Corporation, an Iowa soft drink manufacturer. He left this position in 1978 and moved to the outskirts of Washington D.C.

== Later life ==
He died of lung cancer on May 4, 1989, one day before his 78th birthday, in Winchester, Virginia. He was buried in Ottumwa Cemetery. His wife, Amelia, died in 2007, aged 93.

Party political offices
Preceded by Lester S. Gillette	Democratic nominee for Governor of Iowa; 1952	Succeeded by Clyde E. Herring
Preceded by Clyde E. Herring	Democratic nominee for Governor of Iowa; 1956, 1958	Succeeded by Edward Joseph McManus
Preceded by Guy Gillette	Democratic nominee for U.S. Senator from Iowa (Class 2); 1960	Succeeded by Elbert B. Smith
Political offices
Preceded by Leo Hoegh	Governor of Iowa; January 17, 1957 – January 12, 1961	Succeeded by Norman A. Erbe
