= 1964 United States gubernatorial elections =

- November 3, 1964

25 governorships
	Majority party	Minority party
Party	Democratic	Republican
Seats before	34	16
Seats after	33	17
Seat change	▼1	▲1
Seats up	18	7
Seats won	17	8
- Democratic hold Democratic gain Republican hold Republican gain No election

United States gubernatorial elections were held on November 3, 1964, concurrently with the presidential election. Elections were held in 25 states and 1 territory. These were the last gubernatorial elections for Florida, Massachusetts, Michigan, and Nebraska to take place in a presidential election year. Florida switched its governor election years to midterm years, while the other three expanded their terms from two to four years. This election also coincided with the Senate and the House elections.

== Race summary ==
State	Governor	Party	First elected	Status	Candidates
Arizona	Paul Fannin	Republican	1958	Incumbent retired. Democratic gain.	▌ ✓ Sam Goddard Jr. (Democratic) 53.2%; ▌ Richard Kleindienst (Republican) 46.8%
Arkansas	Orval Faubus	Democratic	1954	Incumbent re-elected.	▌ ✓ Orval Faubus (Democratic) 57.0%; ▌ Winthrop Rockefeller (Republican) 43.0%
Delaware	Elbert N. Carvel	Democratic	1948; 1952 (lost); 1960	Incumbent term-limited. Democratic hold.	▌ ✓ Charles L. Terry Jr. (Democratic) 51.4%; ▌ David P. Buckson (Republican) 48.7%
Florida	C. Farris Bryant	Democratic	1960	Incumbent term-limited. Democratic hold.	▌ ✓ W. Haydon Burns (Democratic) 56.2%; ▌ Charles R. Holley (Republican) 41.3%; Write-ins 2.6%
Illinois	Otto Kerner Jr.	Democratic	1960	Incumbent re-elected.	▌ ✓ Otto Kerner Jr. (Democratic) 51.9%; ▌ Charles H. Percy (Republican) 48.1%
Indiana	Matthew E. Welsh	Democratic	1960	Incumbent term-limited. Democratic hold.	▌ ✓ Roger D. Branigin (Democratic) 56.2%; ▌ Richard O. Ristine (Republican) 43.5%; ▌ Chester G. Bohannon (Prohibition) 0.28%; ▌ Gordon A. Long (Socialist Labor) 0.06%
Iowa	Harold Hughes	Democratic	1962	Incumbent re-elected.	▌ ✓ Harold Hughes (Democratic) 68.1%; ▌ Evan Hultman (Republican) 31.3%; ▌ Robert Dilley (Conservative) 0.7%
Kansas	John Anderson Jr.	Republican	1960	Incumbent retired. Republican hold.	▌ ✓ William H. Avery (Republican) 50.9%; ▌ Harry G. Wiles (Democratic) 47.1%; ▌ Kenneth L. Myers (Conservative) 1.4%; ▌ Harry E. Livermore (Prohibition) 0.7%
Massachusetts	Endicott Peabody	Democratic	1962	Incumbent lost renomination. Republican gain.	▌ ✓ John Volpe (Republican) 50.27%; ▌ Francis Bellotti (Democratic) 49.29%; ▌Francis A. Votano (Socialist Labor) 0.27%; ▌Guy S. Williams (Prohibition) 0.16%
Michigan	George W. Romney	Republican	1962	Incumbent re-elected.	▌ ✓ George W. Romney (Republican) 55.9%; ▌Neil Staebler (Democratic) 43.7%; ▌Frank Lovell (Socialist Workers) 0.18%; ▌Albert B. Cleage Jr. (Freedom Now) 0.15%; ▌James Horvath (Socialist Labor) 0.06%
Missouri	John M. Dalton	Democratic	1960	Incumbent term-limited. Democratic hold.	▌ ✓ Warren E. Hearnes (Democratic) 62.1%; ▌ Ethan Shepley (Republican) 37.9%
Montana	Tim Babcock	Republican	1962 (Note: Babcock became governor in 1962 when predecessor (Donald Grant Nutter) died.)	Incumbent elected to full term.	▌ ✓ Tim Babcock (Republican) 51.3%; ▌ Roland Renne (Democratic) 48.7%
Nebraska	Frank B. Morrison	Democratic	1960	Incumbent re-elected.	▌ ✓ Frank B. Morrison (Democratic) 60.0%; ▌ Dwight Burney (Republican) 40.0%
New Hampshire	John W. King	Democratic	1962	Incumbent re-elected.	▌ ✓ John W. King (Democratic) 66.8%; ▌ John Pillsbury (Republican) 33.2%
New Mexico	Jack M. Campbell	Democratic	1962	Incumbent re-elected.	▌ ✓ Jack M. Campbell (Democratic) 60.2%; ▌Merle H. Tucker (Republican) 39.8%
North Carolina	Terry Sanford	Democratic	1960	Incumbent term-limited. Democratic hold.	▌ ✓ Dan K. Moore (Democratic) 56.6%; ▌ Robert L. Gavin (Republican) 43.4%
North Dakota	William L. Guy	Democratic-NPL	1960	Incumbent re-elected.	▌ ✓ William L. Guy (Democratic-NPL) 55.7%; ▌ Donald M. Halcrow (Republican) 44.3%
Rhode Island	John Chafee	Republican	1962	Incumbent re-elected.	▌ ✓ John Chafee (Republican) 61.2%; ▌ Edward P. Gallogly (Democratic) 38.9%
South Dakota	Archie M. Gubbrud	Republican	1960	Incumbent not renominated. Republican hold.	▌ ✓ Nils Boe (Republican) 51.7%; ▌ John F. Lindley (Democratic) 48.3%
Texas	John Connally	Democratic	1962	Incumbent re-elected.	▌ ✓ John Connally (Democratic) 73.8%; ▌ Jack Crichton (Republican) 26.0%; ▌ John C. Williams (Constitution) 0.2%
Utah	George Dewey Clyde	Republican	1956	Incumbent retired. Democratic gain.	▌ ✓ Cal Rampton (Democratic) 57.0%; ▌ Mitchell Melich (Republican) 43.0%
Vermont	Philip H. Hoff	Democratic	1962	Incumbent re-elected.	▌ ✓ Philip H. Hoff (Democratic) 65.4%; ▌ Ralph A. Foote (Republican) 34.6%
Washington	Albert Rosellini	Democratic	1956	Incumbent lost re-election. Republican gain.	▌ ✓ Daniel J. Evans (Republican) 55.8%; ▌ Albert Rosellini (Democratic) 43.9%; ▌ Henry Killman (Socialist Labor) 0.4%
West Virginia	Wally Barron	Democratic	1960	Incumbent term-limited. Democratic hold.	▌ ✓ Hulett C. Smith (Democratic) 54.9%; ▌ Cecil Underwood (Republican) 45.1%
Wisconsin	John W. Reynolds Jr.	Democratic	1962	Incumbent lost re-election. Republican gain.	▌ ✓ Warren P. Knowles (Republican) 50.6%; ▌ John W. Reynolds Jr. (Democratic) 49.4%

== Closest races ==
States where the margin of victory was under 5%:

1. Massachusetts, 0.98%
2. Wisconsin, 1.11%
3. Montana, 2.58%
4. Delaware, 2.70%
5. South Dakota, 3.34%
6. Kansas, 3.81%
7. Illinois, 3.85%

States where the margin of victory was under 10%:

1. Arizona, 6.48%
2. West Virginia, 9.82%

Red denotes states won by Republicans. Blue denotes states won by Democrats.

== See also ==
- 1964 United States elections
  - 1964 United States presidential election
  - 1964 United States Senate elections
  - 1964 United States House of Representatives elections
