= List of elections in 1960 =

The following elections occurred in 1960.

== Africa ==
- 1960 Cameroonian parliamentary election
- 1960 Dahomeyan general election
- 1960 Ghanaian presidential election
- 1960 Ivorian general election
- 1960 Libyan general election
- 1960 Malagasy parliamentary election
- 1960 South African republic referendum
- 1960 Tanganyikan general election

== America ==
- 1960 Antigua and Barbuda general election
- 1960 Argentine legislative election
- 1960 Bolivian general election
- 1960 Brazilian presidential election
- 1960 British Virgin Islands general election
- 1960 Colombian parliamentary election
- 1960 Ecuadorian general election
- 1960 Falkland Islands general election
- 1960 Panamanian general election
- 1960 Paraguayan parliamentary election
- 1960 Salvadoran legislative election

=== Canada ===
- 1960 British Columbia general election
- 1960 Edmonton municipal election
- 1960 New Brunswick general election
- 1960 Northwest Territories general election
- 1960 Nova Scotia general election
- 1960 Ottawa municipal election
- 1960 Quebec general election
- 1960 Saskatchewan general election
- 1960 Toronto municipal election

=== United States ===
- 1960 United States elections
- 1960 United States presidential election

==== United States lieutenant gubernatorial ====
- 1960 Delaware lieutenant gubernatorial election
- 1960 Illinois lieutenant gubernatorial election
- 1960 Louisiana lieutenant gubernatorial election
- 1960 Minnesota lieutenant gubernatorial election
- 1960 Missouri lieutenant gubernatorial election
- 1960 Nebraska lieutenant gubernatorial election
- 1960 North Carolina lieutenant gubernatorial election
- 1960 Texas lieutenant gubernatorial election
- 1960 Wisconsin lieutenant gubernatorial election

==== United States gubernatorial ====
- 1960 Arizona gubernatorial election
- 1960 Arkansas gubernatorial election
- 1960 Delaware gubernatorial election
- 1960 Florida gubernatorial election
- 1960 Illinois gubernatorial election
- 1960 Indiana gubernatorial election
- 1960 Iowa gubernatorial election
- 1960 Kansas gubernatorial election
- 1960 Louisiana gubernatorial election
- 1960 Maine gubernatorial special election
- 1960 Massachusetts gubernatorial election
- 1960 Michigan gubernatorial election
- 1960 Minnesota gubernatorial election
- 1960 Missouri gubernatorial election
- 1960 Montana gubernatorial election
- 1960 Nebraska gubernatorial election
- 1960 New Hampshire gubernatorial election
- 1960 New Mexico gubernatorial election
- 1960 North Carolina gubernatorial election
- 1960 Rhode Island gubernatorial election
- 1960 South Dakota gubernatorial election
- 1960 Texas gubernatorial election
- 1960 United States gubernatorial elections
- 1960 Utah gubernatorial election
- 1960 Vermont gubernatorial election
- 1960 Washington gubernatorial election
- 1960 West Virginia gubernatorial election
- 1960 Wisconsin gubernatorial election

==== United States House of Representatives ====
- 1960 United States House of Representatives elections

==== United States Senate ====
- 1960 United States Senate elections
- 1960 United States Senate election in Alabama
- 1960 United States Senate election in Alaska
- 1960 United States Senate election in Arkansas
- 1960 United States Senate election in Colorado
- 1960 United States Senate election in Delaware
- 1960 United States Senate election in Georgia
- 1960 United States Senate election in Idaho
- 1960 United States Senate election in Illinois
- 1960 United States Senate election in Iowa
- 1960 United States Senate election in Kansas
- 1960 United States Senate election in Kentucky
- 1960 United States Senate election in Louisiana
- 1960 United States Senate election in Maine
- 1960 United States Senate election in Massachusetts
- 1960 United States Senate election in Michigan
- 1960 United States Senate election in Minnesota
- 1960 United States Senate election in Mississippi
- 1960 United States Senate special election in Missouri
- 1960 United States Senate election in Montana
- 1960 United States Senate election in Nebraska
- 1960 United States Senate election in New Hampshire
- 1960 United States Senate election in New Jersey
- 1960 United States Senate election in New Mexico
- 1960 United States Senate election in North Carolina
- 1960 United States Senate special election in North Dakota
- 1960 United States Senate election in Oklahoma
- 1960 United States Senate election in Oregon
- 1960 United States Senate election in Rhode Island
- 1960 United States Senate election in South Carolina
- 1960 United States Senate election in South Dakota
- 1960 United States Senate election in Tennessee
- 1960 United States Senate election in Texas
- 1960 United States Senate election in Virginia
- 1960 United States Senate election in West Virginia
- 1960 United States Senate election in Wyoming

== Asia ==
- 1960 Burmese general election
- July 1960 Ceylonese parliamentary election
- March 1960 Ceylonese parliamentary election
- 1960 Cypriot legislative election
- 1960 Iranian legislative election
- 1960 Japanese general election
- 1960 Laotian parliamentary election
- 1960 Lebanese general election
- 1960 Malayan local elections
- 1960 Mongolian parliamentary election
- 1960 North Vietnamese legislative election
- 1960 South Korean local elections
- March 1960 South Korean presidential election
- August 1960 South Korean presidential election
- 1960 South Korean legislative election
- 1960 Taiwanese local elections
- 1960 Taiwan presidential election

== Europe ==
- 1960 Czechoslovak parliamentary election
- 1960 Danish parliamentary election
- 1960 Icelandic presidential election
- 1960 Irish local elections
- 1960 Italian local elections
- 1960 Liechtenstein local elections
- 1960 Slovak parliamentary election
- 1960 Swedish general election

=== United Kingdom ===
- 1960 Blyth by-election
- 1960 Bolton East by-election
- 1960 Brighouse and Spenborough by-election
- 1960 Carshalton by-election
- 1960 Ebbw Vale by-election
- 1960 Edinburgh North by-election
- 1960 Harrow West by-election
- 1960 Ludlow by-election
- 1960 Mid Bedfordshire by-election
- 1960 Petersfield by-election
- 1960 Tiverton by-election
- 1960 Labour Party leadership election
- 1960 United Kingdom local elections

== Oceania ==
- 1960 New Zealand general election
- 1960 Queensland state election
