= Stan Musial =

American baseball player (1920–2013)

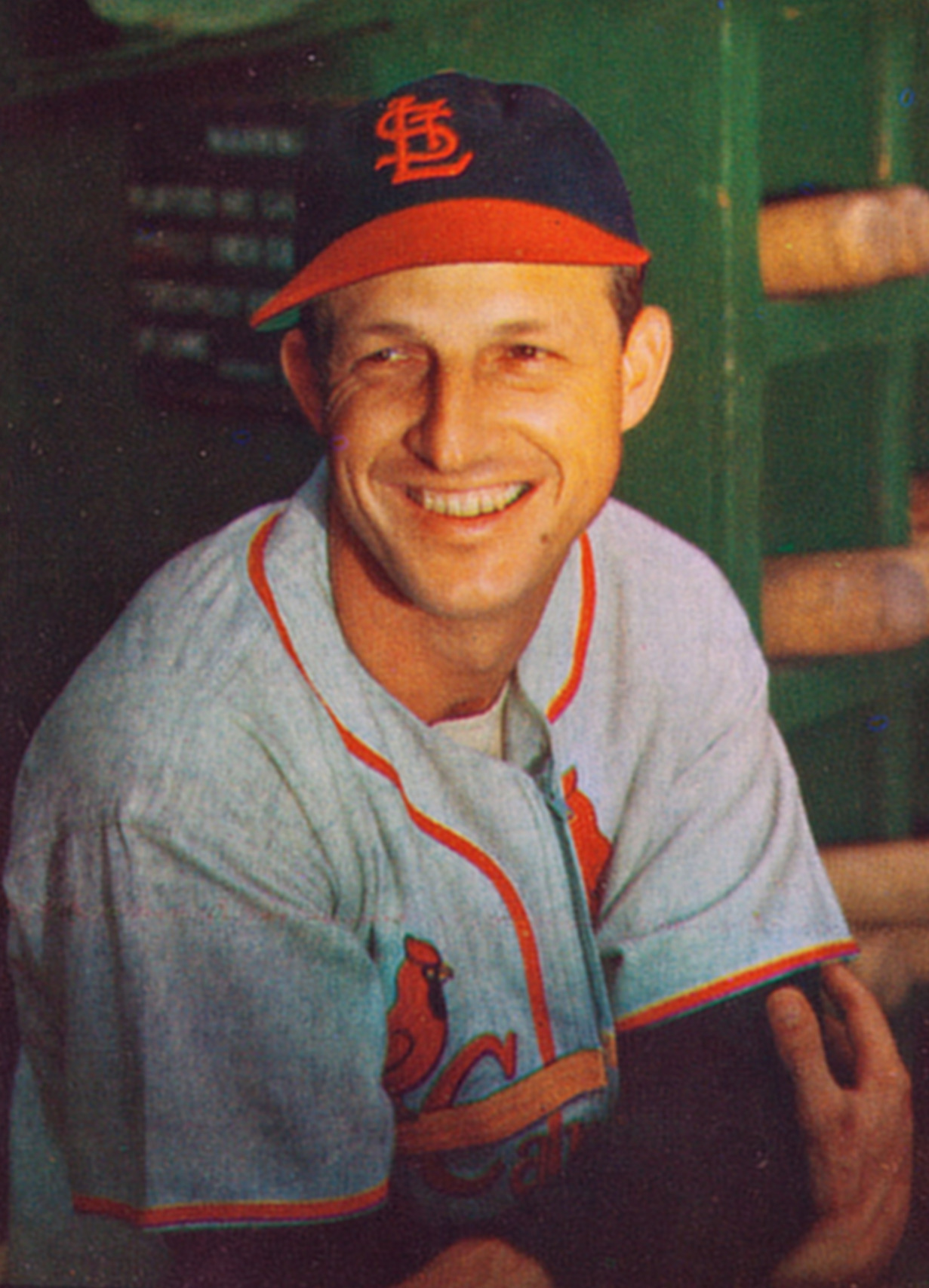
- Musial in 1953
- Outfielder / First baseman
- Born: November 21, 1920; Donora, Pennsylvania, U.S.
- Died: January 19, 2013 (aged 92); Ladue, Missouri, U.S.
- Batted: Left Threw: Left

MLB debut
- September 17, 1941, for the St. Louis Cardinals

Last MLB appearance
- September 29, 1963, for the St. Louis Cardinals

MLB statistics
- Batting average: .331
- Hits: 3,630
- Home runs: 475
- Runs batted in: 1,951
- Stats at Baseball Reference

Teams
- St. Louis Cardinals (1941–1944, 1946–1963)

Career highlights and awards
- 24× All-Star (1943, 1944, 1946–1963); 3× World Series champion (1942, 1944, 1946); 3× NL MVP (1943, 1946, 1948); 7× NL batting champion (1943, 1946, 1948, 1950–1952, 1957); 2× NL RBI leader (1948, 1956); St. Louis Cardinals No. 6 retired; St. Louis Cardinals Hall of Fame; Major League Baseball All-Century Team

Member of the National

Baseball Hall of Fame
- Induction: 1969
- Vote: 93.2% (first ballot)

Stanley Frank Musial (/ˈmjuːziəl, -ʒəl/; born Stanislaw Franciszek Musial; November 21, 1920 – January 19, 2013), nicknamed "Stan the Man", was an American professional baseball player. Widely considered to be one of the greatest and most consistent hitters in baseball history, Musial spent 22 seasons as an outfielder and first baseman in Major League Baseball (MLB), playing for the St. Louis Cardinals from 1941 to 1944 and from 1946 to 1963. He was inducted into the Baseball Hall of Fame in 1969 in his first year of eligibility.

Musial was born in Donora, Pennsylvania, where he played on the baseball team at Donora High School. Signed to a professional contract by the St. Louis Cardinals as a pitcher in 1938, Musial was converted into an outfielder and made his major league debut in 1941. Noted for his unique batting stance, he quickly established himself as a consistent and productive hitter. In his first full season, 1942, the Cardinals won the World Series. The following year, Musial led the NL in six different offensive categories and earned his first MVP award. He was also named to the NL All-Star squad for the first time; he appeared in every All-Star game in every subsequent season he played. Musial won his second World Series championship in 1944, then missed the 1945 season while serving in the Navy. After completing his military service, Musial returned to baseball in 1946 and resumed his consistent hitting. That year, he earned his second MVP award and his third World Series title. His third MVP award came in 1948, when he finished one home run short of winning baseball's Triple Crown.

Over the next decade, Musial won four more batting crowns and variously led the NL multiple times in runs, doubles, slugging percentage, total bases, and games played, as well as posting seasonal leads in hits, triples, RBIs, and walks. He batted well over .300 every single year and was fearsome enough at the plate to lead the NL in intentional walks in five of 10 seasons beginning in 1949 through 1958. After struggling offensively in 1959, Musial used a personal trainer to help maintain his productivity until he retired in 1963.

Over the course of his career, Musial batted .331 and set National League (NL) records for career hits (3,630) (1,815 each at home and on the road), runs batted in (1,951), games played (3,026), at bats (10,972), runs scored (1,949) and doubles (725). His 475 career home runs then ranked second in NL history, behind only Mel Ott's total of 511. A seven-time batting champion, he was named the NL Most Valuable Player (MVP) three times and was a member of three World Series championship teams. At the time of his retirement, he held or shared 17 major league records and 29 National League records. He also shares the major league record for the most All-Star Games played (24) with Hank Aaron and Willie Mays. (Note: Major League Baseball held two All-Star Games for the years from 1959 to 1962.)

In addition to overseeing personal businesses during and after his playing career, Musial served as the Cardinals' general manager in 1967. The team won the pennant and the 1967 World Series, and Musial then resigned his position. Musial was selected for the Major League Baseball All-Century Team in 1999. In February 2011, President Barack Obama presented Musial with the Presidential Medal of Freedom, the highest civilian award that can be bestowed on a person by the United States government.

== Early life ==
Musial was born in Donora, Pennsylvania, as Stanislaw Franciszek Musial (Polish: Stanisław Franciszek Musiał) on November 21, 1920. He was the fifth of the six children (four girls and two boys) of Lukasz Musial (originally Łukasz Musiał; /ˈmuːʃaʊ/) and Maria "Mary" Lancos. His mother was a Czech American born in New York City. His father was a Polish immigrant from Przemyśl who always referred to his son by the Polish nickname Stasiu, pronounced "Stashu". Young Stan frequently played baseball with his brother Ed and other friends during his childhood, and considered Lefty Grove his favorite ballplayer. Musial also learned about baseball from his neighbor Joe Barbao, a former minor league pitcher. When he enrolled in school, his name was formally changed to Stanley Frank Musial.

At age 15, Musial joined the Donora Zincs, a semi-professional team managed by Barbao. In his Zincs debut, he pitched six innings and struck out 13 batters, all of them adults. He played one season on the newly revived Donora High School baseball team, where one of his teammates was Buddy Griffey, father of MLB player Ken Griffey Sr. and grandfather of Ken Griffey Jr. His exploits as a rising player in Pennsylvania earned him the nickname "The Donora Greyhound".

Musial also played basketball and was offered an athletic scholarship to play it at the University of Pittsburgh. Meanwhile, the St. Louis Cardinals had scouted Musial as a pitcher and offered him a professional contract after a 1937 workout with their Class D Penn State League affiliate. Musial's father initially resisted the idea of his son pursuing a baseball career, but he reluctantly gave consent after lobbying by his son and his wife. Musial also credited his school librarian Helen Kloz for pointing out that baseball was his dream and advising him to pursue it professionally. In what was then a common practice, the Cardinals did not file the contract with the baseball commissioner's office until June 1938. This preserved Musial's amateur eligibility, and he was still able to participate in high school sports, leading Donora High School's basketball team to a playoff appearance. He then reported to the Cardinals' Class D affiliate in West Virginia, the Williamson Red Birds.

== Professional career ==
=== Minor leagues ===
Musial's rookie year with Williamson in 1938 was a period of adjustment both on and off the field. He began gaining more in-depth knowledge about baseball strategy while posting a 6–6 win–loss record and a 4.66 earned run average (ERA), to go along with a .258 batting average. Off the field, he experienced feelings of homesickness while learning to live comfortably and independently on his $65-per-month salary (equivalent to $1,220 in 2025). Musial finished his high school education before returning to Williamson in spring 1939. That season his numbers improved to a 9–2 record, a 4.30 ERA, and a .352 batting average. Musial spent the 1940 season with the Cardinals' other Class D team, the Daytona Beach Islanders, where he developed a lifelong friendship with manager Dickie Kerr. His pitching skills improved under the guidance of Kerr, who also recognized his hitting talent, playing him in the outfield between pitching starts. On May 25, 1940, Musial married fellow Donora resident, Lillian "Lil" Labash in Daytona Beach, and the couple's first child followed in August. During late August, Musial suffered a shoulder injury while playing in the outfield, and later made an early exit as the starting pitcher in a 12–5 playoff game loss. For a while Musial considered leaving baseball entirely, complaining that he could not afford to support himself and his wife on the $16 a week pay. Kerr talked him out of it, and even took the Musials into his own home to relieve the financial burden. To repay the debt, Musial bought Kerr a $20,000 (equivalent to $220,000 in 2025) home in Houston in 1958. In 113 games in 1940 he hit .311, while compiling an 18–5 pitching record that included 176 strikeouts and 145 walks.

Musial was assigned to the Class AA Columbus Red Birds to begin 1941, though manager Burt Shotton and Musial himself quickly realized that the previous year's injury had considerably weakened his arm. He was reassigned to the Class C Springfield Cardinals as a full-time outfielder, and he later credited manager Ollie Vanek for displaying confidence in his hitting ability. During 87 games with Springfield, Musial hit a league-leading .379 before being promoted to the Rochester Red Wings of the International League. He was noted for his unique batting stance, a crouch in which his back was seemingly square to the pitcher. This stance was later described by pitcher Ted Lyons as "a kid peeking around the corner to see if the cops were coming". According to a 1950 description by author Tom Meany, "The bent knees and the crouch give him the appearance of a coiled spring, although most pitchers think of him as a coiled rattlesnake." Musial continued to play well in Rochester—in one three-game stretch, he had 11 hits. He was called up to the Cardinals for the last two weeks of the 1941 season.

=== St. Louis Cardinals (1941–1944) ===
Musial's statue outside of Busch Stadium captures his signature batting stance.

Musial made his major league debut during the second game of a doubleheader at Sportsman's Park on September 17, 1941. The Cardinals were in the midst of a pennant race with the Brooklyn Dodgers; in 12 games, Musial collected 20 hits for a .426 batting average. Despite Musial's late contributions, the Cardinals finished two and one-half games behind the 100-game-winning Dodgers.

Cardinals manager Billy Southworth used Musial as a left fielder to begin 1942, sometimes lifting him for a pinch-hitter against left-handed pitching. Musial was hitting .315 by late June, as the Cardinals resumed battling the Dodgers for first place in the National League (NL). The Cardinals took sole possession of first place on September 13, and when Musial caught a fly ball to end the first game of a doubleheader on September 27 they clinched the pennant with their 105th win. He finished the season with a .315 batting average and 72 runs batted in (RBI) in 140 games. Musial received national publicity when he was named by St. Louis Post-Dispatch sports editor J. Roy Stockton as his choice for Rookie of the Year in a Saturday Evening Post article.

The Cardinals played the American League champion New York Yankees in the 1942 World Series. Representing the winning run at home plate in the bottom of the ninth inning of Game 1 at Sportsman's Park, Musial grounded out with the bases loaded to end the game. Musial's first hit of the Series was an RBI single that provided the margin of victory in Game 2, allowing the Cardinals to tie the Series. Over the next three games at Yankee Stadium, Musial had three more hits as the Cardinals defeated the Yankees in the Series four games to one. Musial batted .222 for the Series, with two runs scored.

Musial's 1943 season started with a brief contract holdout in spring training. He made the National League All-Star team for the first time as a starting left fielder and got a double in the All-Star Game on July 13. He finished the season leading the major leagues in hitting with a .357 batting average and led the NL in hits (220), doubles (48), triples (20), total bases (347), on-base percentage (.425), and slugging percentage (.562). This performance earned him his first NL Most Valuable Player Award, ahead of teammate and catcher Walker Cooper (.318 batting average). After romping to another NL pennant by 18 games, the Cardinals again faced the Yankees in the 1943 World Series. Musial had a single in the Cardinals' Game 1 loss, and scored a run in a Game 2 win. The Cardinals did not win another game in the Series, but the loser's bonus share paid to each Cardinals player ($4,321.99, equivalent to $80,400 in 2025) still amounted to nearly two-thirds of Musial's regular season salary.

United States involvement in World War II began to impinge on Musial's baseball career in 1944, as he underwent a physical examination in prelude to possible service in the armed forces. He ultimately remained with the Cardinals for the entire season, posting a .347 batting average with 197 hits. The Cardinals claimed the NL pennant for the third consecutive season, and faced St. Louis's other major league team, the Browns, in the 1944 World Series. The Browns took a 2–1 lead, while Musial hit .250 with no RBI. He broke out in Game 4 with a two-run home run, single, double, and a walk as part of a 5–1 Cardinals win. The Cardinals went on to defeat the Browns in six games, and Musial posted a .304 batting average for the Series.

=== U.S. Navy (1945–46) ===
Musial enlisted in the United States Navy on January 23, 1945, during World War II. He was initially assigned to non-combat duty at the United States Naval Training Center Bainbridge, at Port Deposit, Maryland. In June 1945, he was assigned to Special Services in Hawaii, and was assigned to a ferry launch unit to bring back damaged ship crews entering Pearl Harbor, where he was able to play baseball every afternoon in the naval base's eight-team league. After being granted emergency leave to see his ailing father in January 1946, he was briefly assigned to the Philadelphia Navy Yard before his honorable discharge from the Navy as a Seaman Second Class in March 1946.

=== St. Louis Cardinals (1946–1963) ===
==== 1946–1949 ====
"Every time Stan came up they chanted, 'Here comes the man!'"

— Cardinals traveling secretary Leo Ward relates Dodger fans' nickname for Musial to sportswriter Bob Broeg

Rejoining the Cardinals under new manager Eddie Dyer, Musial posted a .388 batting average by the middle of May 1946. He also became close friends with Red Schoendienst, a second-baseman who had joined the Cardinals during Musial's absence in 1945. In June 1946, Dyer began to use Musial as a first baseman.

During the season, Musial (who was under contract to the Cardinals for $13,500 in 1946) was offered a five-year, $125,000 contract, plus a $50,000 bonus, to join the Mexican League. He declined the offer, and after manager Dyer spoke to club owner Sam Breadon, Musial was given a $5,000 raise later in 1946.

It was also during the 1946 season that Musial acquired his nickname of Stan the Man. During the June 23 game against the Dodgers at Ebbets Field, St. Louis Post-Dispatch sportswriter Bob Broeg heard Dodger fans chanting whenever Musial came to bat, but could not understand the words. Later that day over dinner, Broeg asked Cardinals traveling secretary Leo Ward if he had understood what the Dodger fans had been chanting. Ward said, "Every time Stan came up they chanted, 'Here comes the man!'" "'That man,' you mean", Broeg said. "No, the man", replied Ward. Broeg mentioned this story in his Post-Dispatch column, and Musial was thereafter known as Stan "The Man".

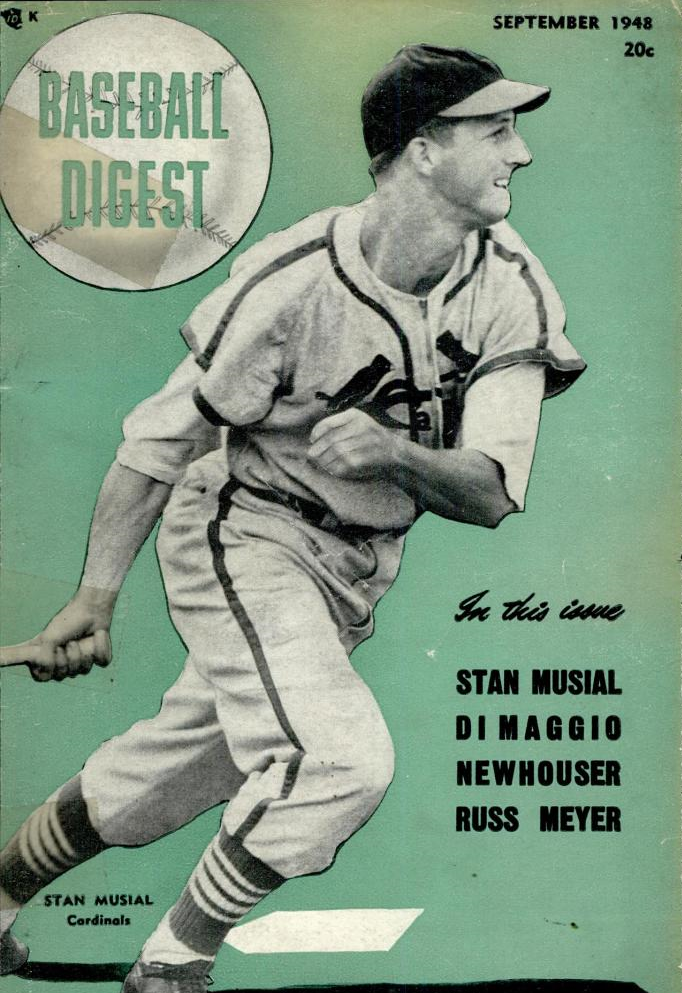
Musial on the cover of Baseball Digest, September 1948

Musial batted .365 for the season and won his second NL MVP Award, receiving 22 out of a possible 24 first-place votes, finishing 22-0 ahead of Brooklyn's Dixie Walker (.319 batting average).

The Cardinals finished the 1946 regular season tied with the Dodgers, prompting a three-game playoff for the pennant. Musial's Game 1 triple and Game 2 double contributed to the Cardinals' two-games-to-none series victory. He had six hits and four RBI in the Cardinals seven game win over the Boston Red Sox in the 1946 World Series.

Musial began the 1947 season by hitting .146 in April. On May 9, team doctor Dr. Robert Hyland confirmed a previous diagnosis of appendicitis, while discovering that Musial was concurrently suffering from tonsillitis. He received treatment, but did not have either his appendix or tonsils removed until after the season ended. Despite his health woes, he finished the year with a batting average of .312.

Fully recovered from his ailments, Musial recorded his 1,000th career hit on April 25, 1948. After a May 7 St. Louis Globe-Democrat article criticized baseball players for appearing in cigarette advertisements, he made a personal decision to never again do so. By June 24, his batting average was .408, prompting Brooklyn pitcher Preacher Roe to joke about the best way to retire Musial: "Walk him on four pitches and pick him off first." Given a mid-season pay raise by new Cardinals owner Robert E. Hannegan for his outstanding performance, Musial hit a home run in the All-Star Game. On September 22, he registered five hits in a game for the fourth time in the season, tying a mark set by Ty Cobb in 1922.

"He missed tying for the top in homers by one rained out home run. If it had counted, he would have won the Triple Crown that year...and in addition have been the only player of this century to lead the league in runs, hits, double, triples, and slugging percentage. What a year!"

— Sportswriter Bob Broeg, on Musial's 1948 season

Musial finished the 1948 season leading the major leagues in batting average (.376), hits (230), doubles (46), triples (18), total bases (429), and slugging percentage (.702). Winning the NL batting title by a 43-point margin, with an on-base percentage lead of 27 points and a 138-point slugging percentage margin—the latter being the largest gap since Rogers Hornsby's 1925 season—Musial became the first player to win three NL MVP awards. Had a home run he hit during a rained out game been counted in his season totals, he would have won the rare Triple Crown by leading the NL in batting average, home runs, and runs batted in.

Anticipating life after his baseball career, Musial began the first of several business partnerships with Julius "Biggie" Garagnani in January 1949, opening "Stan Musial & Biggie's" restaurant.

Musial approached the 1949 season with the intent to try to hit more home runs, stating he had hit 39 the previous season "without trying". His new focus on hitting for power backfired, as pitchers began using the outside part of the plate to induce him to ground out to the first or second baseman. Musial soon stopped focusing on hitting home runs, and resumed his consistent offensive production by the end of May. He received his sixth consecutive All-Star player selection and finished the season leading the NL in hits (207) while playing in every game. However, the 96-win Cardinals finished one game behind the Dodgers.

In the late 1940s, when baseball was slowly becoming integrated, Musial—along with his roommate Red Schoendienst—would be lauded by newcomers such as Dodgers' pitcher Don Newcombe for their tolerance. "They never...had the need to sit in the dugout and call a black guy a bunch of names", Newcombe said, "because he was trying to change the game and make it what it should have been in the first place, a game for all people."

==== 1950–1954 ====
Musial began the 1950s by posting a .350 batting average before participating in the 1950 All-Star Game, where in fan balloting he was the NL's number two choice. He had the longest hitting streak of his career during the 1950 season—a 30-game stretch that ended on July 27. With the Cardinals falling 14 games out of first place by September, manager Dyer used him at first base and all three outfield positions.

New Cardinals manager Marty Marion led the team to a third-place finish in 1951, while Musial led the National League with a .355 batting average, 355 total bases, 124 runs and 12 triples. He finished second in NL MVP voting for the third year in a row and was named The Sporting News Major League Player of the Year.

"No man has ever been a perfect ballplayer. Stan Musial, however, is the closest to being perfect in the game today.... He plays as hard when his club is away out in front of a game as he does when they're just a run or two behind."

— Ty Cobb, on Musial in a 1952 Life magazine article

National media attention inadvertently turned to Musial a month before the 1952 season began, after Ty Cobb wrote an article regarding modern baseball players that was published in Life magazine. Cobb singled out Musial and Phil Rizzuto as the only players "who can be mentioned in the same breath with the oldtime greats". Cobb went on to refer to Musial as "a better player than Joe DiMaggio was in his prime." In response, Musial displayed his characteristic modesty, saying, "Cobb is baseball's greatest. I don't want to contradict him, but I can't say that I was ever as good as Joe DiMaggio."

The only major league pitching appearance of Musial's career occurred as a publicity stunt during the last Cardinals home game of the 1952 season. Manager Eddie Stanky had a reluctant Musial pitch to Frank Baumholtz, the runner-up to Musial for the best batting average in the NL that season. With Baumholtz batting right-handed for the first time in his career, Musial's first pitch was hit so hard it ricocheted off the shin of third baseman Solly Hemus and into the left field corner. The play was ruled an error, and Musial was embarrassed enough by his complicity in the gimmick to avoid pitching again for the remainder of his career.

The Cardinals franchise was up for sale in early 1953, and Musial and Schoendienst advised their friend and fellow duck-hunter Gussie Busch to consider buying the team. Busch used the resources of the Anheuser-Busch company to purchase the Cardinals, keeping Musial in St. Louis by averting the possibility of a move by the team to another city. The 1953 season marked Musial's 10th NL All-Star selection, and the 12th consecutive time he finished a major league season with a batting average above .300.

An All-Star again in 1954, Musial had an off year, batting .331 and only leading the National League in runs, doubles, and intentional walks. He was second in times on base; third in hits, extra base hits, and walks; and fourth in batting average, triples, RBIs, slugging percentage, and total bases.

Musial accomplished another historical feat during 1954, in a on May 2 doubleheader in St. Louis against the New York Giants: he hit three home runs in the first contest, then added two more in the second to become the first major leaguer to hit five home runs in a doubleheader. In addition to his five home runs, he also hit a single in the first game, setting a new record of 21 total bases for a doubleheader. The only player besides Musial to hit five home runs in a doubleheader is Nate Colbert, who achieved the feat in 1972. Oddly enough, as a young child, Colbert was in attendance as Musial set his record.

==== 1955–1959 ====
Musial made his 12th NL All-Star appearance in 1955 as a reserve player, when Cincinnati's Ted Kluszewski – coming off a monster 49/141/.326 season and on his way to another 47 home runs – outpolled him by 150,000 votes for the start at first base. Musial entered the game as a pinch hitter in the fourth inning and played left field, with the game going into extra innings. Leading off the bottom of the 12th, he hit a walk-off home run to give the NL a 6–5 victory. He batted .319 for the season, tied with Willie Mays for second in the NL.

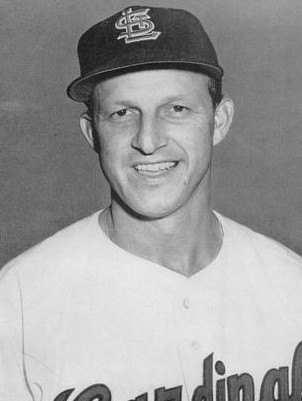
Musial in 1957

The 1956 season marked another milestone for Musial, when he broke Mel Ott's NL record for extra-base hits on August 12. Earlier that season, Cardinals general manager "Trader Frank" Lane began negotiations to trade him for Philadelphia pitcher Robin Roberts. When Cardinals owner Gussie Busch learned of the possible move, he made it clear that Musial was not available for any deal. Instead, Lane dealt Musial's close friend Schoendienst, by then a nine time All-Star and Hall of Fame bound, to the New York Giants; an upset Musial made no immediate comment to the press.

On June 11, 1957, Musial tied the NL record for consecutive games played with his 822nd, a streak that began on the last day of the 1951 season. Despite ballot stuffing by Cincinnati Reds fans, he was selected and played in the All-Star Game held at Sportsman's Park. When he overextended his swing while batting during a game on August 23, Musial fractured a bone in his left shoulder socket and tore muscles over his collarbone. He was unable to play again until September 8, ending his consecutive games-played streak at 895. He finished 1957 as Sports Illustrated's "Sportsman of the Year", earning another batting title (.351) in a terrific overall season that saw him finish second in the NL MVP race in a tight finish of Hank Aaron (239 points), Musial (231), and Schoendienst (222).

"Line drive! Into left field! Hit number three thousand! A run has scored! Musial around first, on his way to second with a double. Holy Cow! He came through!"

— Harry Caray's radio play-by-play call of Musial's 3,000th major league hit

Musial signed one of the first $100,000 contracts in NL history on January 29, 1958. (According to Baseball Almanac, Hank Greenberg was the first with Pittsburgh in 1947.) He started fast, batting .374, with 4 HR, and 16 RBI in May. Although he had wished to reach the 3,000-hit milestone in St. Louis, it ended up being a pinch-hit, sixth inning RBI double at Chicago's Wrigley Field on May 13, making him the eighth major league player to reach the mark. Roughly 1,000 fans met him at St. Louis Union Station that evening. Musial ended a solid 1958 season batting .337, third in the NL, but for the first time since his illness plagued “appendicitis“ season of 1955 he failed to lead the league in a significant offensive category (for only the second time in his career).

Finishing the season in sixth place, the Cardinals embarked on an exhibition tour of Japan, winning 14 of 16 games against top players from the Central and Pacific Japanese Leagues.

Taking a new approach to preparation for the 1959 season, the 38 year-old Musial was given permission to report late to spring training so that he might conserve his energy for the long season ahead. Musial, at 6 feet (180 cm) tall, had maintained a weight of around 175 pounds (79 kg) throughout his career. He reported to spring training approximately 10 pounds (4.5 kg) overweight and in substandard physical condition. He began the season with one hit in 15 at-bats. Despite his early offensive struggles, he spoiled potential no-hitters on April 16 and 19. A game-winning home run on May 7 made him the first major league player ever with 400 home runs and 3,000 hits.

As he continued to hit at a relatively low pace, Musial's playing time was limited by Cardinals manager Solly Hemus at various points during the season. Seeking more revenue for the players' pension fund, Major League Baseball held two All-Star games in a season from 1959 through 1962. Musial made his 16th straight All-Star appearance, stretching back to his breakout 1943 MVP campaign his third year in the big leagues. He pinch-hit in both contests. Cooling off for the first time ever, he finished the season with 115 regular game appearances, a lowly .255 batting average, 37 runs, and an anemic slugging percentage of .428, far below his then career marks of .337 and .572.

During the 1959 season, John F. Kennedy approached Musial about supporting Kennedy's campaign for President, citing their close ages. Musial campaigned for Kennedy later that year and became a supporter of the Democratic Party.

On June 30, 1959, Musial was the batter in one of the oddest plays in baseball history. In a game between the Cardinals and Chicago Cubs, he was at the plate with a count of 3–1. Pitcher Bob Anderson let fly, the ball evading catcher Sammy Taylor and rolling all the way to the backstop. Umpire Vic Delmore called ball four, even as Anderson and Taylor contended that Musial had foul tipped the ball for strike two. Because the ball was still in play and Delmore was embroiled in an argument with the catcher and pitcher, Musial kept running in attempt to make second base. Seeing that Musial was trying for second, third baseman Alvin Dark ran to the backstop to retrieve the ball. The ball had wound up in the hands of field announcer Pat Pieper, but Dark wrestled it back. Absentmindedly, Delmore pulled out a new ball and gave it to Anderson. Anderson finally noticed that Musial was trying for second, took the new ball, and threw it to second baseman Tony Taylor. Still wild, his throw flew over Taylor's head into the outfield. Dark, at the same time that Anderson threw the new ball, threw the original ball to shortstop Ernie Banks. Musial did not see Dark's throw and only noticed Anderson's ball fly over the second baseman's head, so he tried to go to third base. On his way there, he was tagged by Banks, and after a delay he was ruled out.

==== 1960–1963 ====
Based on his 1959 performance, Musial accepted a pay cut in 1960 from his previous $100,000 salary to $80,000. He was eager to prove that his mediocre performance was the result of improper physical conditioning, and he enlisted the help of Walter Eberhardt, Saint Louis University's director of physical education. In June 1960, newspaper articles began speculating that Musial would soon retire, yet he finished the season with a .275 batting average. He addressed the speculation in September, confirming that he would play again in 1961. His .288 batting average that season reaffirmed his decision. In 1962, Musial posted a .330 batting average, good for third in the batting race, with 19 homers and 82 RBI. As a pinch-hitter, he had 14 base hits in 19 at-bats (.737). Along the way, he established new NL career marks for hits and RBI. That same year on July 8, the 41-year-old Musial became the oldest player ever to hit three home runs in one game.

Stan Musial's number 6 was retired by the St. Louis Cardinals in 1963.

The Cardinals began 1963 by winning 10 of their first 15 games, as Musial posted a .237 batting average. He set a new major league record for career extra-base hits on May 8 and improved his batting average to .277 by the end of the month. Making his 20th All-Star appearance and playing in his 24th All-Star Game on July 9, 1963, he pinch-hit in the fifth inning. Asked by general manager Bing Devine on July 26 what his plans were, Musial said that he would retire at season's end. He waited until the Cardinals team picnic on August 12 to publicly announce his decision, hopeful he could retire on a winning note.

Musial became a grandfather for the first time in the early hours of September 10; later that day, he hit a home run in his first at-bat. After sweeping a doubleheader on September 15, the Cardinals had won 19 of their last 20 games, and were one game behind the Los Angeles Dodgers. The Dodgers then swept the Cardinals in a three-game series in St. Louis and clinched the NL pennant on September 25. Musial's last game, on September 29, 1963, was preceded by an hour-long retirement ceremony. Speakers at the event included baseball commissioner Ford Frick, Cardinals broadcaster Harry Caray, and Cardinals owner Gussie Busch, who announced that Musial's uniform number "6" would be retired by the team. During the game, Musial recorded a single in the fourth inning, then hit a single to right field that scored teammate Curt Flood in the sixth, matching the two hits he had gotten in his 1943 big league debut. Cardinals manager Johnny Keane brought in a pinch-runner for Musial, bringing his major league career to an end.

Musial finished with the all-time National League hits record and second to only Ty Cobb on the all-time Major League list. Musial's last career hit was out of reach of Cincinnati Reds second baseman Pete Rose, who would go on to break Cobb's record to become baseball's all-time hit king.

"All Musial represents is more than two decades of sustained excellence and complete decency as a human being."

— Broadcaster Bob Costas, on Musial

At the time of his retirement, Musial held or shared 17 major league records, 29 NL records, and nine All-Star Game records. Among those records, he ranked as the major league career leader in extra-base hits (1,377) and total bases (6,134), the equivalent of over 104.5 miles if laid end to end.

He also held NL career marks in categories such as hits (3,630), games played (3,026), doubles (725), and RBI (1,951). He finished his career with 475 home runs despite never having led the NL in the category. Jerry Lansche speculates Musial would likely have become the second player, after Babe Ruth, with 2,000 RBI, and would have exceeded 500 career home runs had he not served in the military. His lowest full season RBI output before the war was 72 (in 1942) and as he needed only 49 RBI to reach 2,000 for his full career, he certainly would have exceeded 2,000 RBI by playing without injury in 1945. His home run production is a different story, as it is simply unknowable whether he would have reached 500 had he continued in the major leagues and not had his playing interrupted by military service. As it is, he did not hit more than 13 home runs in any season before he entered the navy and did not hit as many as the required 25 until 1948, three years after returning to baseball.

Amazingly, Musial's 22-year MLB career hit total was exactly evenly split between 1,815 at home and 1,815 on the road. He recorded 8 five-hit games and 59 four-hit games. He had two 3-home run games, on May 2, 1954, and July 8, 1962. As a pinch-hitter, he recorded a .276 batting average (going 37-for-134).

Musial was the first major league player to appear in more than 1,000 games at two different positions, registering 1,896 games in the outfield and 1,016 at first base. Since Musial's retirement in 1963, Tony Gwynn has been the only player to finish his career with a higher lifetime batting average. Hank Aaron has been the only player to surpass his record of 6,134 total bases.

In Musial's 3,026 major league appearances he was never ejected from a game. Speaking about his quiet reputation within the sport's history, sportscaster Bob Costas said, "He didn't hit a homer in his last at-bat; he hit a single. He didn't hit in 56 straight games. He married his high school sweetheart and stayed married to her. ... All Musial represents is more than two decades of sustained excellence and complete decency as a human being."

== Post-playing career ==
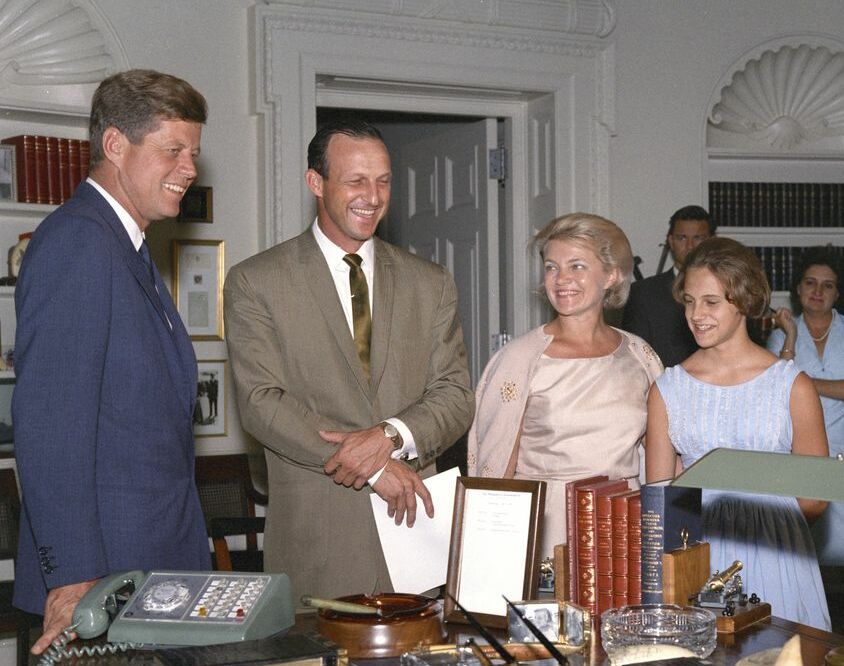
Musial with President John F. Kennedy, his wife, Lillian, and daughter, Janet, in the Oval Office in 1962

Musial was named a vice president of the St. Louis Cardinals in September 1963, and he remained in that position until after the 1966 season. From February 1964 to January 1967, he also served as President Lyndon B. Johnson's physical fitness adviser, a part-time position created to promote better fitness among American citizens. Before the 1967 season began, the Cardinals named Musial the team's general manager, and he oversaw the club's World Series championship that year. He won the allegiance of Cardinals players by making fair offers from the outset of player-contract negotiations and creating an in-stadium babysitting service so players' wives could attend games.

== Personal life ==
Musial met Lillian Susan Labash, the daughter of a local grocer, in Donora when both were 15, and married her in St. Paul's Catholic Church in Daytona Beach, Florida on May 25, 1940. They had four children: son Richard, and daughters Gerry, Janet, and Jeanie. Lillian Musial died at 91, on May 3, 2012; their marriage had lasted for almost 72 years.

Stan Musial, baseball legend and Hall of Famer, in Saint Louis, Missouri, 2004

Musial was noted for his harmonica playing, which included his rendition of "Take Me Out to the Ball Game". Throughout the 1990s, he frequently played the harmonica at public gatherings, such as the annual Baseball Hall of Fame induction ceremony and various charity events. He appeared on the television show Hee Haw in 1985, and in 1994 recorded 18 songs that were sold in tandem with a harmonica-playing instruction booklet.

Even though Musial left Donora after high school, he retained close ties to the town throughout the rest of his life. He maintained membership in local social clubs, and regularly sent a local doctor boxes of autographed baseballs, with the town's mayor using some for United Way fundraising. Musial also gave free meals at the restaurant he owned in St. Louis to any customers who presented valid ID proving they were Donora residents.

During his playing years, Musial believed in racial equality and supported Jackie Robinson's right to play. After learning about the harmful effect of smoking in the 1950s, he refused to endorse tobacco products.

== Death ==
On January 19, 2013, surrounded by his family, Musial died at age 92 of natural causes at his home in Ladue, Missouri, on the same day as fellow MLB Hall of Fame inductee Earl Weaver. Cardinals owner Bill DeWitt Jr. released the following statement:

We have lost the most beloved member of the Cardinals family. Stan Musial was the greatest player in Cardinals history and one of the best players in the history of baseball. The entire Cardinals organization extends its sincere condolences to Stan's family, including his children Richard, Gerry, Janet and Jean, as well as his eleven grandchildren and twelve great grandchildren. We join fans everywhere in mourning the loss of our dear friend and reflect on how fortunate we all are to have known 'Stan the Man'.

Upon hearing the news of his death, fans gathered and began an impromptu memorial at his statue outside Busch Stadium; the Cardinals issued a release saying the memorial would be left in place for some time. In a laudatory obituary, The New York Times quoted famed New York manager Leo Durocher: "There is only one way to pitch to Musial—under the plate."

Missouri Governor Jay Nixon commented: "Stan Musial was a great American hero who—with the utmost humility—inspired us all to aim high and dream big. The world is emptier today without him, but far better to have known him. The legacy of 'baseball's perfect warrior' will endure and inspire generations to come."

St. Louis Mayor Francis Slay tweeted: "Sad as we are, we are fortunate to have had Stan in STL for so long, and are also glad that Stan and Lil are together again." He ordered flags at half-staff in the city.

"Major League Baseball has lost one of its true legends in Stan Musial, a Hall of Famer in every sense and a man who led a great American life", Commissioner Bud Selig said. "He was the heart and soul of the historic St. Louis Cardinals franchise for generations, and he served his country during World War II. A recipient of the Presidential Medal of Freedom in 2011, Stan's life embodies baseball's unparalleled history and why this game is the national pastime."

Thousands of fans braved cold temperatures on January 24 for a public visitation at the Cathedral Basilica of Saint Louis, where Musial lay in state, dressed in his trademark cardinal-red blazer and with a harmonica in his lapel pocket, flanked by a Navy honor guard. A private funeral Mass was held on Saturday, January 26, 2013, at the New Cathedral in St. Louis, televised locally by KTVI and KPLR as well as Fox Sports Midwest on pay-television. New York's Cardinal Timothy Dolan, who in his first episcopal post served as an auxiliary bishop of the Archdiocese of Saint Louis, was the principal celebrant, and Knoxville's Bishop Richard F. Stika, Musial's former parish priest, was the homilist. An emotional Bob Costas gave the principal eulogy, calling him "the genuine hero who as the years and decades passed, and disillusionment came from other directions, never once let us down", and quoting fellow Cooperstown honoree Mickey Mantle, who once said that Musial "was a better player than me because he was a better man than me".

== Career statistics ==
=== Hitting ===
Category	G	AB	H	2B	3B	HR	R	RBI	BB	SO	AVG	OBP	SLG	OPS	OPS+	TB	Ref.
Total	3,026	10,972	3,630	725	177	475	1,949	1,951	1,599	696	.331	.417	.559	.976	159	6,134	

=== Fielding ===
Category	G	Ch	PO	A	E	DP	FP	Ref.
OF	1,890	3924	3,730	130	64	27	.984	
1B	1,016	9475	8,709	688	78	935	.992	

== Honors and recognition ==
"Here stands baseball's perfect warrior. Here stands baseball's perfect knight."

— Quote inscribed on the base of Musial's statue, attributed to former commissioner Ford Frick

On August 4, 1968, a statue of Musial was erected outside of Busch Memorial Stadium on the northeast grounds of the St. Louis stadium, and relocated to the west side of Busch Stadium when it opened in 2006. Its inscribed quote is attributed to former baseball commissioner Ford Frick: "Here stands baseball's perfect warrior. Here stands baseball's perfect knight."

In 1968, Musial received the Golden Plate Award of the American Academy of Achievement.

Musial was elected to the Baseball Hall of Fame in his first year of eligibility in 1969, being named on 93.2% of the ballots. He was ranked tenth on The Sporting News' list of the 100 Greatest Baseball Players published in 1998. He was also one of the 30 players selected to the Major League Baseball All-Century Team, added by a special committee after he finished 11th in fan voting among outfielders.

On June 14, 1973, Musial was the first inductee into the National Polish-American Hall of Fame, housed at St. Mary's College in Orchard Lake, Michigan. In 1989, he was inducted into the St. Louis Walk of Fame. Five years later, a baseball field was named after him in his hometown of Donora. In 2000, he was inducted into the Hall of Famous Missourians, and a bronze bust depicting him is on permanent display in the rotunda of the Missouri State Capitol.

In 1987, Musial visited Kutno, Poland, donating $50,000 worth of sports equipment to the Polish Baseball Association (PZBall). He later became an honorary citizen of Kutno. In August 2000, the Stan Musial Stadium was built on 40 acres of land donated by Kutno to Little League Baseball.

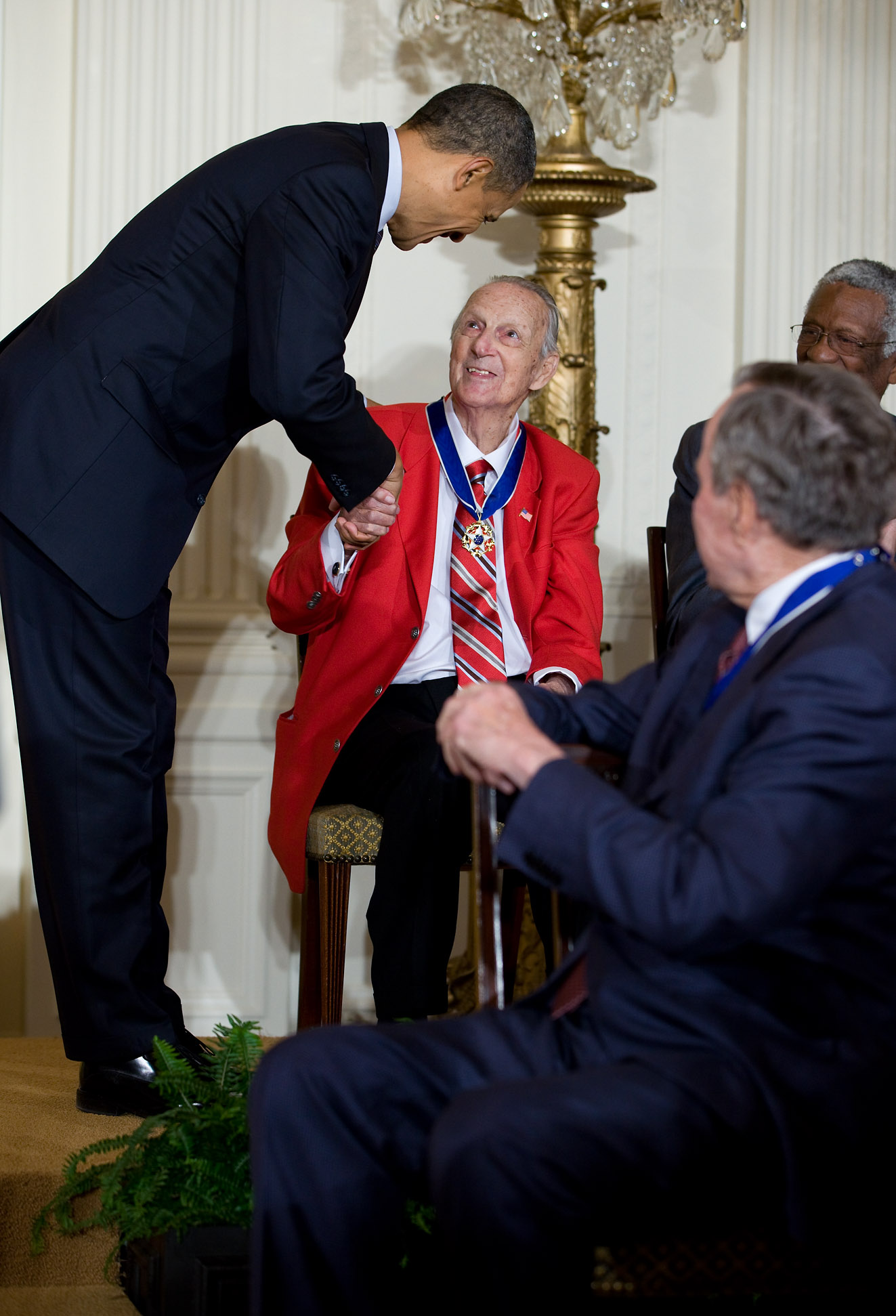
President Barack Obama awards the 2010 Presidential Medal of Freedom to Stan Musial in a ceremony in the East Room of the White House February 15, 2011.

Nearly two decades after Musial retired, baseball statistician Bill James and the sabermetrics movement began providing new ways of comparing players across baseball history. In 2001, James ranked Musial the tenth-greatest baseball player in history, and the second-best left fielder of all time. According to Baseball-Reference.com, he ranks fifth all-time among hitters on the Black Ink Test, and third all-time on the Gray Ink Test—measures designed to compare players of different eras. He ranks first on Baseball-Reference's Hall of Fame Monitor Test, and is tied for second in the Hall of Fame Career Standards Test. Despite his statistical accomplishments, he is sometimes referred to as the most underrated or overlooked athlete in modern American sports history. Said sportswriter Jayson Stark of his 2007 analysis of baseball's under- and overrated players, "I can't think of any all-time great in any sport who gets left out of more who's-the-greatest conversations than Stan Musial."

Musial threw out the first pitch in the fifth game of the 2006 World Series. In 2007, he received the Navy Memorial's Lone Sailor Award, which honors Navy veterans who have excelled in civilian life. In 2009 Musial delivered the ceremonial first pitch ball to President Barack Obama at the 2009 Major League Baseball All-Star Game. A "Stan the Man" day was held in his honor by the Cardinals on May 18, 2008. In 2010, another one of the Cardinals' greatest sluggers, Albert Pujols said he didn't want to be called "The Man", even in Spanish ("El Hombre"), because "There is one man that gets that respect, and that is Stan Musial."

Also in 2010, the Cardinals began pushing for Musial to be awarded the Presidential Medal of Freedom for his lifetime of achievement and service. On February 15, 2011, Musial received the honor from President Obama, who called him "an icon untarnished, a beloved pillar of the community, a gentleman you'd want your kids to emulate."

On October 18, 2012, Musial made his final appearance at Busch Stadium, riding in a golf cart around the field before Game 4 of the National League Championship Series between the San Francisco Giants and Cardinals. The Cardinals would win Game 4 by a score of 8–3, but lost the pennant to the Giants.

In January 2014, the Cardinals announced Musial among 22 former players and personnel to be inducted into the St. Louis Cardinals Hall of Fame and Museum for the inaugural class of 2014.

In 2022, as part of their SN Rushmore project, The Sporting News named Musial on their "St. Louis Mount Rushmore of Sports", along with fellow Cardinals Bob Gibson and Albert Pujols, and St. Louis Blues hockey player Brett Hull. That same year, MLB.com writers voted Musial as being the greatest player in Cardinals franchise history:

Musial is one of the game's undisputed greats, and he played his entire 22-year career with the Cardinals. The outfielder and first baseman won three MVP Awards and finished second four other times. Musial won seven batting titles and led the league in runs five times, hits six times, doubles eight times, triples five times, RBIs twice, total bases six times and OPS seven times. He was a 24-time All-Star and a three-time World Series winner. He hit a career .331/.417/.559 and accumulated 128.3 WAR. Musial's No. 6 was the first number the Cardinals retired, and he became a first-ballot Hall of Famer in 1969.

== Legacy ==
Musial has had numerous awards, places, and civic structures named after him.

In May 2011, the Pennsylvania State Legislature changed the name of the Donora-Monessen Bridge over the Monongahela River from to Stan Musial Bridge after the Donora native. In October 2013, the St. Louis Fire Department started operating a fireboat named after Musial. In July 2013, the new Interstate 70 bridge over the Mississippi River between Illinois and Missouri at St. Louis received the official name of Stan Musial Veterans Memorial Bridge. In 2013, the Bob Feller Act of Valor Award honored Musial as one of 37 Baseball Hall of Fame members for his service in the United States Navy during World War II. Major League Baseball's Stan Musial Lifetime Achievement Award was named in his honor.

== See also ==
- Major League Baseball titles leaders
- List of Major League Baseball batting champions
- List of Major League Baseball annual doubles leaders
- List of Major League Baseball annual triples leaders
- List of Major League Baseball annual runs scored leaders
- List of Major League Baseball annual runs batted in leaders
- List of Major League Baseball career at-bat leaders
- List of Major League Baseball career bases on balls leaders
- List of Major League Baseball career doubles leaders
- List of Major League Baseball career extra base hits leaders
- List of Major League Baseball career games played leaders
- List of Major League Baseball career on-base percentage leaders
- List of Major League Baseball career OPS leaders
- List of Major League Baseball career plate appearance leaders
- List of Major League Baseball career runs batted in leaders
- List of Major League Baseball career runs scored leaders
- List of Major League Baseball career singles leaders
- List of Major League Baseball career slugging percentage leaders
- List of Major League Baseball career triples leaders
- List of Major League Baseball career total bases leaders
- List of Major League Baseball single-season triples leaders
- List of Major League Baseball players to hit for the cycle
- List of Major League Baseball players who spent their entire career with one franchise
- List of Presidential Medal of Freedom recipients

== Notes ==
Awards and achievements
Preceded by Gil Hodges	Hitting for the cycle July 24, 1949	Succeeded by George Kell
Preceded by Award established	Major League Player of the Month; May 1958 (with Willie Mays)	Succeeded by Frank Thomas
