= 1960 West Virginia gubernatorial election =

- November 8, 1960
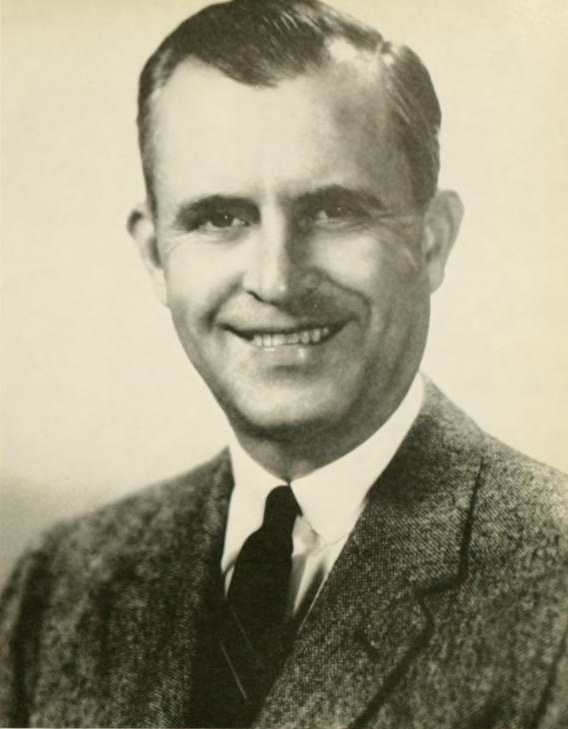

Nominee	Wally Barron	Harold E. Neely
Party	Democratic	Republican
Popular vote	446,755	380,665
Percentage	53.99%	46.01%
- County results Barron: 50–60% 60–70% 70–80% Neely: 50–60% 60–70% 70–80%
Governor before election
Cecil H. Underwood
Republican
Elected Governor
Wally Barron
Democratic

The 1960 West Virginia gubernatorial election took place on November 8, 1960, to elect the governor of West Virginia. Hulett C. Smith unsuccessfully ran for the Democratic nomination, while former United States Senator Chapman Revercomb unsuccessfully ran for the Republican nomination.

== Results ==
1960 West Virginia gubernatorial election
Party	Candidate	Votes	%
Democratic	Wally Barron	446,755	53.99
Republican	Harold E. Neely	380,665	46.01
Total votes		827,420	100
Democratic gain from Republican			

=== Results by county ===
County	William Wallace Barron Democratic		Harold E. Neely Republican		Margin		Total votes cast
County	#	%	#	%	#	%	Total votes cast
Barbour	4,222	53.46%	3,676	46.54%	546	6.91%	7,898
Berkeley	7,637	50.43%	7,506	49.57%	131	0.87%	15,143
Boone	8,159	67.01%	4,016	32.99%	4,143	34.03%	12,175
Braxton	4,182	59.07%	2,898	40.93%	1,284	18.14%	7,080
Brooke	7,406	56.32%	5,745	43.68%	1,661	12.63%	13,151
Cabell	22,119	46.53%	25,418	53.47%	-3,299	-6.94%	47,537
Calhoun	2,148	56.23%	1,672	43.77%	476	12.46%	3,820
Clay	2,958	56.45%	2,282	43.55%	676	12.90%	5,240
Doddridge	1,273	37.19%	2,150	62.81%	-877	-25.62%	3,423
Fayette	17,776	70.03%	7,609	29.97%	10,167	40.05%	25,385
Gilmer	2,298	59.69%	1,552	40.31%	746	19.38%	3,850
Grant	1,086	26.17%	3,063	73.83%	-1,977	-47.65%	4,149
Greenbrier	8,307	56.27%	6,455	43.73%	1,852	12.55%	14,762
Hampshire	3,292	63.38%	1,902	36.62%	1,390	26.76%	5,194
Hancock	10,716	57.77%	7,835	42.23%	2,881	15.53%	18,551
Hardy	2,643	59.93%	1,767	40.07%	876	19.86%	4,410
Harrison	21,664	56.11%	16,947	43.89%	4,717	12.22%	38,611
Jackson	3,683	40.70%	5,366	59.30%	-1,683	-18.60%	9,049
Jefferson	4,359	62.58%	2,606	37.42%	1,753	25.17%	6,965
Kanawha	54,523	49.59%	55,423	50.41%	-900	-0.82%	109,946
Lewis	4,094	46.90%	4,635	53.10%	-541	-6.20%	8,729
Lincoln	5,309	54.84%	4,372	45.16%	937	9.68%	9,681
Logan	16,188	67.28%	7,873	32.72%	8,315	34.56%	24,061
Marion	18,623	58.77%	13,066	41.23%	5,557	17.54%	31,689
Marshall	8,692	48.21%	9,338	51.79%	-646	-3.58%	18,030
Mason	4,863	44.82%	5,986	55.18%	-1,123	-10.35%	10,849
McDowell	18,826	73.90%	6,648	26.10%	12,178	47.81%	25,474
Mercer	17,606	61.21%	11,159	38.79%	6,447	22.41%	28,765
Mineral	4,595	45.10%	5,593	54.90%	-998	-9.80%	10,188
Mingo	11,178	69.34%	4,942	30.66%	6,236	38.68%	16,120
Monongalia	13,039	54.00%	11,107	46.00%	1,932	8.00%	24,146
Monroe	3,004	49.60%	3,052	50.40%	-48	-0.79%	6,056
Morgan	1,485	36.80%	2,550	63.20%	-1,065	-26.39%	4,035
Nicholas	5,960	60.04%	3,967	39.96%	1,993	20.08%	9,927
Ohio	16,057	45.87%	18,948	54.13%	-2,891	-8.26%	35,005
Pendleton	2,284	58.21%	1,640	41.79%	644	16.41%	3,924
Pleasants	1,873	50.36%	1,846	49.64%	27	0.73%	3,719
Pocahontas	2,880	55.18%	2,339	44.82%	541	10.37%	5,219
Preston	4,674	42.74%	6,263	57.26%	-1,589	-14.53%	10,937
Putnam	5,356	50.12%	5,330	49.88%	26	0.24%	10,686
Raleigh	18,818	58.36%	13,424	41.64%	5,394	16.73%	32,242
Randolph	8,121	67.88%	3,842	32.12%	4,279	35.77%	11,963
Ritchie	1,738	31.69%	3,747	68.31%	-2,009	-36.63%	5,485
Roane	3,315	43.68%	4,275	56.32%	-960	-12.65%	7,590
Summers	4,096	52.95%	3,640	47.05%	456	5.89%	7,736
Taylor	3,679	49.59%	3,740	50.41%	-61	-0.82%	7,419
Tucker	2,367	59.32%	1,623	40.68%	744	18.65%	3,990
Tyler	1,854	34.99%	3,445	65.01%	-1,591	-30.02%	5,299
Upshur	2,812	36.87%	4,814	63.13%	-2,002	-26.25%	7,626
Wayne	9,678	56.27%	7,521	43.73%	2,157	12.54%	17,199
Webster	3,477	69.95%	1,494	30.05%	1,983	39.89%	4,971
Wetzel	4,394	47.08%	4,939	52.92%	-545	-5.84%	9,333
Wirt	1,149	48.60%	1,215	51.40%	-66	-2.79%	2,364
Wood	16,041	43.18%	21,111	56.82%	-5,070	-13.65%	37,152
Wyoming	8,179	60.71%	5,293	39.29%	2,886	21.42%	13,472
Totals	446,755	53.99%	380,665	46.01%	66,090	7.99%	827,420
