= 1964 United States elections =

- ← 1962 1963 1964 1965 1966 → Presidential election year
- Election day: November 3
- Incumbent president: ▌Lyndon B. Johnson (D)
- Next Congress: 89th

Presidential election
- Partisan control: Democratic hold
- Popular vote margin: Democratic +22.6%
- Electoral vote
- Lyndon B. Johnson (D): 486
- Barry Goldwater (R): 52
- 1964 presidential election results. Red denotes states won by Goldwater, blue denotes states won by Johnson. Numbers indicate the electoral votes won by each candidate.

Senate elections
- Overall control: Democratic hold
- Seats contested: 35 of 100 seats (33 Class 1 seats + 3 special elections)
- Net seat change: Democratic +2
- 1964 Senate results Democratic gain Democratic hold Republican gain Republican hold

House elections
- Overall control: Democratic hold
- Seats contested: All 435 voting members
- Popular vote margin: Democratic +14.7%
- Net seat change: Democratic +38
- 1964 House of Representatives results Democratic gain Democratic hold Republican gain Republican hold

Gubernatorial elections
- Seats contested: 25
- Net seat change: Republican +1
- 1964 gubernatorial election results Democratic gain Democratic hold Republican gain Republican hold

Elections were held in the United States on November 3, 1964, to elect the President of the United States and members of the 89th United States Congress. The elections were held during the Civil Rights Movement and the escalation of the Vietnam War. President Lyndon B. Johnson defeated Senator Barry Goldwater of Arizona in the presidential election, and Johnson's Democratic Party added to their majorities in both chambers of Congress. This was the first presidential election after the ratification of the 23rd Amendment, which granted electoral votes to Washington, D.C.

Democratic incumbent President Lyndon B. Johnson (who took office on November 22, 1963, upon the death of his predecessor, John F. Kennedy) won a full term, defeating Republican Senator Barry Goldwater from Arizona. Johnson won every state except for Arizona and the Deep South. Johnson won 61% of the popular vote, the largest share of the popular vote since 1820. This share of the popular vote has not been exceeded since, as of 2024. Goldwater won the Republican nomination on the first ballot, defeating Governor William Scranton of Pennsylvania and Governor Nelson Rockefeller of New York.

The Democratic Party picked up 37 seats in the House and two seats in the Senate, thereby capturing veto-proof supermajorities in both chambers. In the gubernatorial elections, the Republican Party won a net gain of one seat. This was the first time since 1948 that a Democratic presidential candidate had coattails in both houses of Congress, which would not occur again until 2008.

As of 2026, this is the most recent presidential election year in which the Democratic Party successfully defended a federal government trifecta and is the only presidential election year where the party did so since 1944. The only time this feat has been replicated in a presidential election year by either party since was when the Republican Party successfully defended a trifecta at the federal level in 2004. It was the last election cycle until 2008 in which a Democratic victory in the presidency had triggered a coattail effect down the ballot.

== See also ==
- 1964 United States presidential election
- 1964 United States House of Representatives elections
- 1964 United States Senate elections
- 1964 United States gubernatorial elections
