= 1964 West Virginia gubernatorial election =

- November 3, 1964
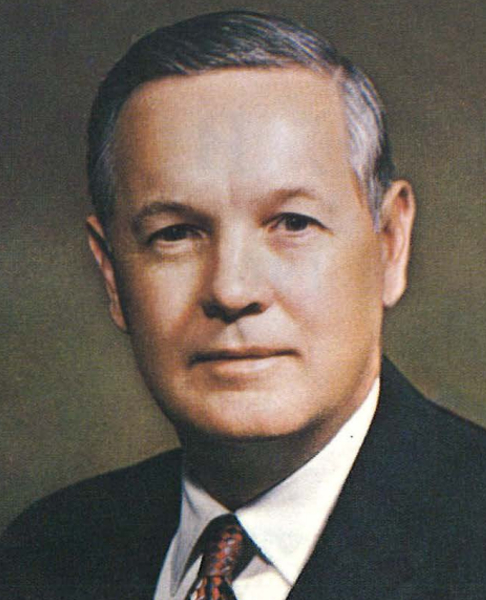

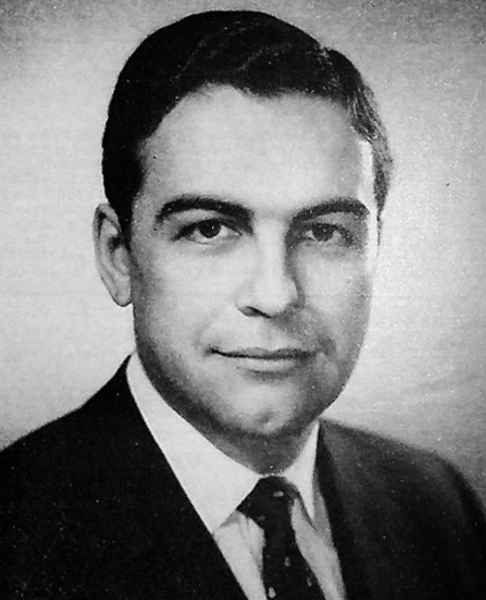
Nominee	Hulett C. Smith	Cecil H. Underwood
Party	Democratic	Republican
Popular vote	433,023	355,559
Percentage	54.91%	45.09%
- County results Smith: 50–60% 60–70% 70–80% Underwood: 50–60% 60–70% 70–80%
Governor before election
Wally Barron
Democratic
Elected Governor
Hulett C. Smith
Democratic

The 1964 West Virginia gubernatorial election took place on November 3, 1964, to elect the governor of West Virginia.

West Virginia at the time was a solidly Democratic state, and the 1964 election year was a strong year for the Democrats nationally with Lyndon Johnson scoring a landslide win over the Republican Barry Goldwater.

The Democrats from a field of four including Julius Singleton, the speaker of the House of Delegates and Harold Cutright who would seek the 1966 Senate nomination as a Republican. The Democrats nominated Hulett Smith recent chair of the West Virginia Democratic Party and son of former Sixth District Representative Joe Smith.

The Republicans overwhelmingly chose the popular former governor Cecil Underwood.

== Results ==
=== Democratic primary ===
West Virginia Democratic gubernatorial primary, 1964
Party	Candidate	Votes	%
Democratic	Hulett C. Smith	186,273	53.26
Democratic	Bonn Brown	85,527	24.45
Democratic	Julius W. Singleton	47,845	13.68
Democratic	Harold G. Cutright	30,119	8.61
Total votes		349,764	100.00

=== Republican primary ===
West Virginia Republican gubernatorial primary, 1964
Party	Candidate	Votes	%
Republican	Cecil H. Underwood	152,573	89.74
Republican	Harry H. Cupp	11,325	6.66
Republican	Freda P. Cavendish	6,114	3.60
Total votes		170,012	100.00

=== General election ===
West Virginia gubernatorial election, 1964
Party	Candidate	Votes	%
Democratic	Hulett C. Smith	433,023	54.91
Republican	Cecil H. Underwood	355,559	45.09
Total votes		788,582	100.00
Democratic hold			

==== Results by county ====
County	Hulett Carlson Smith Democratic		Cecil Harland Underwood Republican		Margin		Total votes cast
County	#	%	#	%	#	%	Total votes cast
Barbour	3,930	53.24%	3,452	46.76%	478	6.48%	7,382
Berkeley	7,079	50.65%	6,897	49.35%	182	1.30%	13,976
Boone	7,366	66.47%	3,716	33.53%	3,650	32.94%	11,082
Braxton	4,000	60.28%	2,636	39.72%	1,364	20.55%	6,636
Brooke	7,169	54.91%	5,888	45.09%	1,281	9.81%	13,057
Cabell	20,991	46.30%	24,343	53.70%	-3,352	-7.39%	45,334
Calhoun	2,030	52.71%	1,821	47.29%	209	5.43%	3,851
Clay	2,732	60.03%	1,819	39.97%	913	20.06%	4,551
Doddridge	1,228	38.73%	1,943	61.27%	-715	-22.55%	3,171
Fayette	17,232	72.24%	6,622	27.76%	10,610	44.48%	23,854
Gilmer	2,124	53.94%	1,814	46.06%	310	7.87%	3,938
Grant	1,111	28.18%	2,832	71.82%	-1,721	-43.65%	3,943
Greenbrier	7,910	54.05%	6,724	45.95%	1,186	8.10%	14,634
Hampshire	2,813	59.55%	1,911	40.45%	902	19.09%	4,724
Hancock	10,998	58.73%	7,728	41.27%	3,270	17.46%	18,726
Hardy	2,333	54.41%	1,955	45.59%	378	8.82%	4,288
Harrison	18,575	51.96%	17,173	48.04%	1,402	3.92%	35,748
Jackson	3,799	40.51%	5,580	59.49%	-1,781	-18.99%	9,379
Jefferson	4,201	63.67%	2,397	36.33%	1,804	27.34%	6,598
Kanawha	54,050	50.14%	53,757	49.86%	293	0.27%	107,807
Lewis	4,043	49.16%	4,182	50.84%	-139	-1.69%	8,225
Lincoln	5,136	54.37%	4,311	45.63%	825	8.73%	9,447
Logan	15,072	72.65%	5,674	27.35%	9,398	45.30%	20,746
Marion	18,122	61.00%	11,584	39.00%	6,538	22.01%	29,706
Marshall	9,704	54.48%	8,107	45.52%	1,597	8.97%	17,811
Mason	5,240	47.70%	5,745	52.30%	-505	-4.60%	10,985
McDowell	16,696	77.98%	4,714	22.02%	11,982	55.96%	21,410
Mercer	16,682	61.58%	10,409	38.42%	6,273	23.16%	27,091
Mineral	5,131	51.40%	4,852	48.60%	279	2.79%	9,983
Mingo	10,855	70.32%	4,581	29.68%	6,274	40.65%	15,436
Monongalia	12,937	54.67%	10,727	45.33%	2,210	9.34%	23,664
Monroe	3,008	51.76%	2,803	48.24%	205	3.53%	5,811
Morgan	1,435	39.13%	2,232	60.87%	-797	-21.73%	3,667
Nicholas	5,378	56.59%	4,125	43.41%	1,253	13.19%	9,503
Ohio	17,104	51.94%	15,824	48.06%	1,280	3.89%	32,928
Pendleton	2,147	57.03%	1,618	42.97%	529	14.05%	3,765
Pleasants	1,854	50.85%	1,792	49.15%	62	1.70%	3,646
Pocahontas	2,652	54.11%	2,249	45.89%	403	8.22%	4,901
Preston	4,987	48.77%	5,238	51.23%	-251	-2.45%	10,225
Putnam	5,525	49.72%	5,587	50.28%	-62	-0.56%	11,112
Raleigh	19,519	63.81%	11,068	36.19%	8,451	27.63%	30,587
Randolph	6,763	61.67%	4,204	38.33%	2,559	23.33%	10,967
Ritchie	1,644	33.07%	3,327	66.93%	-1,683	-33.86%	4,971
Roane	3,037	42.35%	4,134	57.65%	-1,097	-15.30%	7,171
Summers	4,301	61.10%	2,738	38.90%	1,563	22.20%	7,039
Taylor	3,521	52.22%	3,222	47.78%	299	4.43%	6,743
Tucker	2,271	56.93%	1,718	43.07%	553	13.86%	3,989
Tyler	1,516	31.14%	3,352	68.86%	-1,836	-37.72%	4,868
Upshur	2,798	37.99%	4,567	62.01%	-1,769	-24.02%	7,365
Wayne	8,813	51.96%	8,148	48.04%	665	3.92%	16,961
Webster	3,024	66.08%	1,552	33.92%	1,472	32.17%	4,576
Wetzel	4,523	47.86%	4,927	52.14%	-404	-4.28%	9,450
Wirt	1,102	49.64%	1,118	50.36%	-16	-0.72%	2,220
Wood	16,901	46.49%	19,452	53.51%	-2,551	-7.02%	36,353
Wyoming	7,911	62.88%	4,670	37.12%	3,241	25.76%	12,581
Totals	433,023	54.91%	355,559	45.09%	77,464	9.82%	788,582
