= Bob Mollohan =

American politician

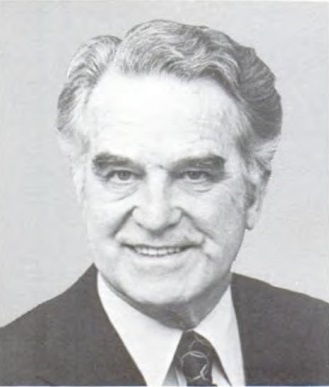

Member of the U.S. House of Representatives from West Virginia's 1st district
- In office January 3, 1969 – January 3, 1983
- Preceded by: Arch A. Moore Jr.
- Succeeded by: Alan Mollohan
- In office January 3, 1953 – January 3, 1957
- Preceded by: Robert L. Ramsay
- Succeeded by: Arch A. Moore Jr.

Personal details
- Born: September 18, 1909 Grantsville, West Virginia, U.S.
- Died: August 3, 1999 (aged 89) Fairmont, West Virginia, U.S.
- Party: Democratic
- Spouse: Helen Holt
- Children: Alan Mollohan
- Education: Glenville State College (BS)

Robert Homer Mollohan (September 18, 1909 – August 3, 1999) was an American politician who served member of the United States House of Representatives from 1953 to 1957 and again from 1969 to 1983. A Democrat from West Virginia, Mollohan was succeeded in Congress by his son, Alan.

== Early life and education ==
Mollohan was born in Grantsville, West Virginia. He attended Glenville State College, graduating with a Bachelor of Science degree in accounting.

== Career ==
After finishing his education, Mollohan was hired by the city of Parkersburg, West Virginia as a tax collector. In 1935, he was promoted to the rank of chief of the miscellaneous tax division. In 1939, the city reassigned Mollohan's duties, making him the local director of the Works Progress Administration. In 1940, he briefly worked for the United States Census Bureau.

For eight years, beginning in 1941, Mollohan was director of the West Virginia Industrial School for Boys in Pruntytown. He left this position in 1949 to become a clerk for the United States Senate. He was elected to the U.S. House of Representatives for West Virginia's 1st congressional district in 1953. Mollohan did not sign the 1956 Southern Manifesto.

After just two terms in Congress, however, Mollohan decided to run for governor of West Virginia in the 1956 West Virginia gubernatorial election. He lost the general election to state house minority leader Cecil Underwood. A week before the election, Mollohan's candidacy was derailed when it emerged that he had received $20,000 and two cars from a coal operator on a strip mine at the Industrial School for Boys while Mollohan was superintendent of the institution.

In 1958, Mollohan decided to run for his old seat, which was then held by Arch A. Moore Jr., a Republican, but was defeated. He temporarily retired from politics and established an insurance agency.

In 1968, Mollohan again sought his old congressional seat after Moore decided to run for governor. Despite his long absence from Congress, Mollohan won the first of seven terms. While in the House for a second time, Mollohan served on the Armed Services Committee and became known for his ability to gain large sums for local 'pork barrel' projects. Mollohan retired from the House in 1983 and was succeeded by his son, Alan, who held the seat until 2011.

Party political offices
Preceded by William C. Marland	Democratic nominee for Governor of West Virginia; 1956	Succeeded by Wally Barron
