= 1956 West Virginia gubernatorial election =

- November 6, 1956
- Turnout: 75.1% (of registered voters)
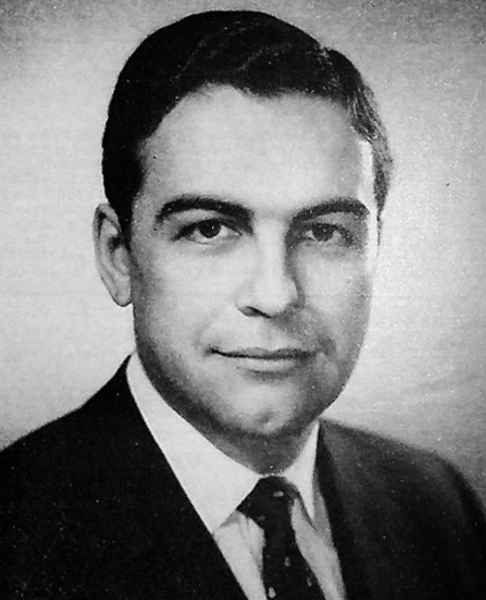

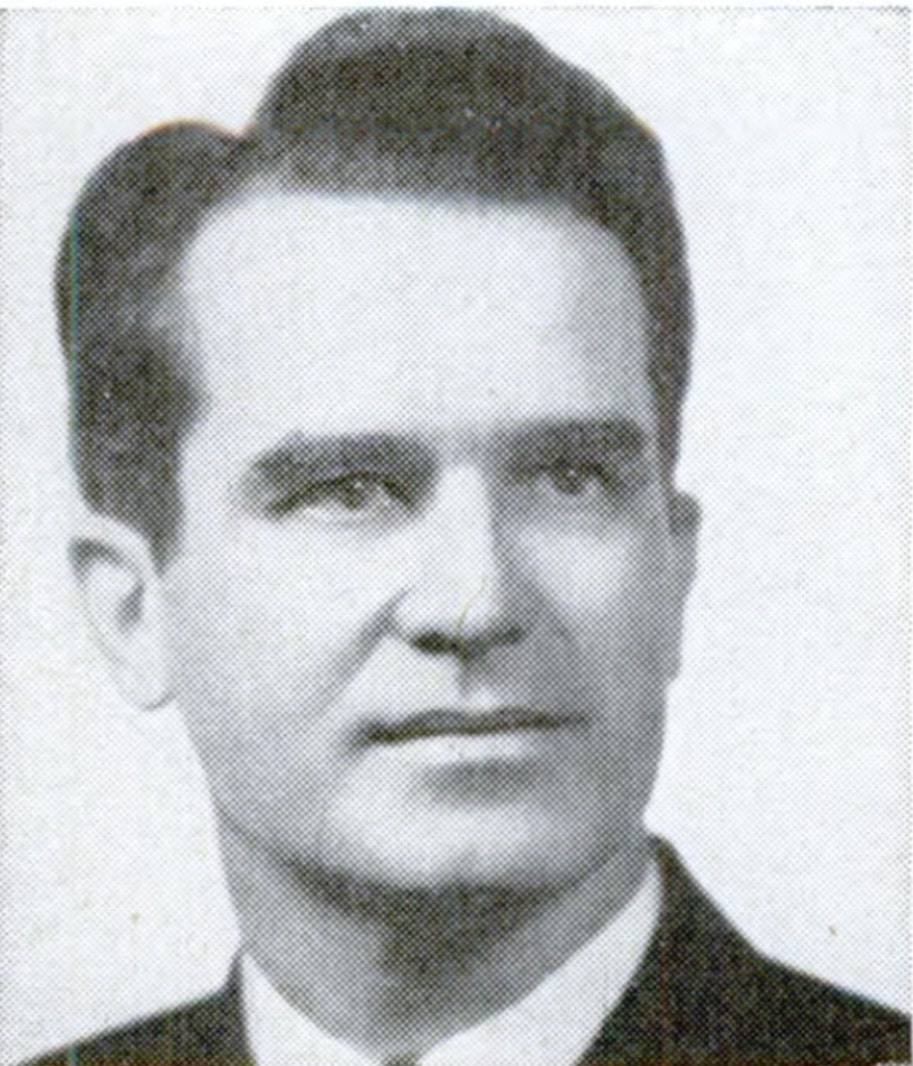
Nominee	Cecil H. Underwood	Bob Mollohan
Party	Republican	Democratic
Popular vote	440,502	377,121
Percentage	53.88%	46.12%
- County results Underwood: 50–60% 60–70% 70–80% 80–90% Mollohan: 50–60% 60–70%
Governor before election
William C. Marland
Democratic
Elected Governor
Cecil H. Underwood
Republican

The 1956 West Virginia gubernatorial election was held on November 6, 1956 to elect the governor of West Virginia. Republican state delegate Cecil H. Underwood won the election over Democratic U.S. representative Bob Mollohan; he was the first Republican elected as governor of West Virginia since 1928 and one of the youngest elected governors in United States history at 34 years old.

Primary elections were held on August 5. In the Democratic primary, Mollohan defeated a divided field led by tax commissioner Milton J. Ferguson and West Virginia Senate clerk J. Howard Myers. In the Republican primary, Underwood narrowly defeated Charleston mayor John T. Coperhaver Sr.

Underwood's campaign was boosted only a week prior to the general election, when it was reported that Mollohan had accepted gifts from a coal operator on a stripe mine while Mollohan was a state prison superintendent at Pruntytown Correctional Center. Underwood won the general election by a surprisingly wide margin.

== Democratic primary ==
=== Candidates ===
- Joe F. Burdett, president of the West Virginia Board of Control
- Milton J. Ferguson, commissioner of the West Virginia Tax Division since 1953 and former state delegate from Wayne
- J. Howard Myers, clerk of the West Virginia Senate
- Bob Mollohan, U.S. representative from Fairmont
- Albert D. Viller

=== Results ===
1956 Democratic gubernatorial primary
Party	Candidate	Votes	%
Democratic	Bob Mollohan	148,557	42.58%
Democratic	Milton J. Ferguson	95,869	27.48%
Democratic	J. Howard Myers	75,606	21.67%
Democratic	Joe F. Burdett	24,913	7.14%
Democratic	Albert D. Viller	3,969	1.14%
Total votes		194,668	100.00%

== Republican primary ==
=== Candidates ===
- John T. Coperhaver Sr., mayor of Charleston
- Millard A. Holliday Sr.
- Cecil H. Underwood, state delegate from Sistersville

=== Results ===
1956 Republican gubernatorial primary
Party	Candidate	Votes	%
Republican	Cecil H. Underwood	98,344	50.52%
Republican	John T. Copenhaver	91,088	46.79%
Republican	Millard A. Holliday Sr.	5,236	2.69%
Total votes		194,668	100.00%

== General election ==
=== Candidates ===
- Bob Mollohan, U.S. representative from Fairmont (Democratic)
- Cecil H. Underwood, state delegate from St. Marys (Republican)

=== Campaign ===
Although in the wake of the United States Supreme Court decision in Brown v. Board of Education, educational desegregation was a live issue across much of the south and the border areas in 1956, it was less salient in West Virginia because Mollohan had not signed the Southern Manifesto and Underwood campaigned on continuing his William C. Marland's policy of desegregation of West Virginia schools and support of civil rights legislation.

=== Results ===
1956 West Virginia gubernatorial election
Party	Candidate	Votes	%
Republican	Cecil H. Underwood	440,502	53.88
Democratic	Bob Mollohan	377,121	46.12
Total votes		817,633	100.00
Republican gain from Democratic			

=== Results by county ===
County	Cecil Harland Underwood Republican		Robert Homer Mollohan Democratic		Margin		Total votes cast
County	#	%	#	%	#	%	Total votes cast
Barbour	4,398	54.49%	3,673	45.51%	725	8.98%	8,071
Berkeley	8,646	59.82%	5,807	40.18%	2,839	19.64%	14,453
Boone	5,390	44.65%	6,681	55.35%	-1,291	-10.70%	12,071
Braxton	3,466	47.77%	3,790	52.23%	-324	-4.47%	7,256
Brooke	5,550	43.42%	7,233	56.58%	-1,683	-13.17%	12,783
Cabell	28,872	61.99%	17,707	38.01%	11,165	23.97%	46,579
Calhoun	2,014	48.95%	2,100	51.05%	-86	-2.09%	4,114
Clay	2,846	52.79%	2,545	47.21%	301	5.58%	5,391
Doddridge	2,637	75.04%	877	24.96%	1,760	50.09%	3,514
Fayette	10,906	41.70%	15,249	58.30%	-4,343	-16.60%	26,155
Gilmer	1,813	48.46%	1,928	51.54%	-115	-3.07%	3,741
Grant	3,321	84.10%	628	15.90%	2,693	68.19%	3,949
Greenbrier	7,975	56.05%	6,254	43.95%	1,721	12.10%	14,229
Hampshire	2,242	46.36%	2,594	53.64%	-352	-7.28%	4,836
Hancock	7,764	43.81%	9,956	56.19%	-2,192	-12.37%	17,720
Hardy	2,169	50.31%	2,142	49.69%	27	0.63%	4,311
Harrison	21,763	56.19%	16,969	43.81%	4,794	12.38%	38,732
Jackson	4,997	66.41%	2,527	33.59%	2,470	32.83%	7,524
Jefferson	3,073	47.97%	3,333	52.03%	-260	-4.06%	6,406
Kanawha	62,142	57.75%	45,455	42.25%	16,687	15.51%	107,597
Lewis	6,143	66.22%	3,133	33.78%	3,010	32.45%	9,276
Lincoln	4,877	49.49%	4,978	50.51%	-101	-1.02%	9,855
Logan	10,476	41.68%	14,658	58.32%	-4,182	-16.64%	25,134
Marion	15,168	47.49%	16,769	52.51%	-1,601	-5.01%	31,937
Marshall	8,464	50.75%	8,215	49.25%	249	1.49%	16,679
Mason	6,272	63.24%	3,646	36.76%	2,626	26.48%	9,918
McDowell	10,264	37.29%	17,258	62.71%	-6,994	-25.41%	27,522
Mercer	13,715	50.01%	13,711	49.99%	4	0.01%	27,426
Mineral	5,768	59.02%	4,005	40.98%	1,763	18.04%	9,773
Mingo	7,476	42.32%	10,191	57.68%	-2,715	-15.37%	17,667
Monongalia	13,594	55.03%	11,111	44.97%	2,483	10.05%	24,705
Monroe	3,547	56.72%	2,707	43.28%	840	13.43%	6,254
Morgan	2,792	70.65%	1,160	29.35%	1,632	41.30%	3,952
Nicholas	5,413	54.39%	4,539	45.61%	874	8.78%	9,952
Ohio	18,964	54.20%	16,024	45.80%	2,940	8.40%	34,988
Pendleton	2,025	52.02%	1,868	47.98%	157	4.03%	3,893
Pleasants	2,194	59.20%	1,512	40.80%	682	18.40%	3,706
Pocahontas	3,008	55.50%	2,412	44.50%	596	11.00%	5,420
Preston	7,535	68.18%	3,517	31.82%	4,018	36.36%	11,052
Putnam	5,809	57.03%	4,376	42.97%	1,433	14.07%	10,185
Raleigh	16,167	50.28%	15,984	49.72%	183	0.57%	32,151
Randolph	5,676	51.48%	5,349	48.52%	327	2.97%	11,025
Ritchie	4,174	74.98%	1,393	25.02%	2,781	49.96%	5,567
Roane	4,701	60.64%	3,051	39.36%	1,650	21.28%	7,752
Summers	3,781	50.78%	3,665	49.22%	116	1.56%	7,446
Taylor	4,516	58.35%	3,223	41.65%	1,293	16.71%	7,739
Tucker	2,386	54.03%	2,030	45.97%	356	8.06%	4,416
Tyler	3,675	74.11%	1,284	25.89%	2,391	48.22%	4,959
Upshur	5,632	73.95%	1,984	26.05%	3,648	47.90%	7,616
Wayne	8,207	52.05%	7,561	47.95%	646	4.10%	15,768
Webster	2,372	44.25%	2,989	55.75%	-617	-11.51%	5,361
Wetzel	4,652	53.37%	4,065	46.63%	587	6.73%	8,717
Wirt	1,413	56.63%	1,082	43.37%	331	13.27%	2,495
Wood	21,000	61.80%	12,978	38.20%	8,022	23.61%	33,978
Wyoming	6,662	47.90%	7,245	52.10%	-583	-4.19%	13,907
Totals	440,502	377,131	53.88%	46.12%	63,371	7.75%	817,633

== Aftermath ==
Underwood's first act as governor was to go on television (a relatively new medium for political communication) and inform every state employee that they were fired. He argued that this was the only way to destroy the corrupt "machine" system. He later advocated an organized civil service and retirement pension system and provided temporary employment relief for low-income families.
