= William Avery =

William Avery may refer to:

- William Avery (Massachusetts politician) (c. 1622–1686), a signatory of the Dedham Covenant
- Bill Avery (born 1942), Nebraska politician and professor
- William Avery (aviator) (died 1942), who piloted glider aircraft of Octave Chanute
- William Avery (basketball) (born 1979), American professional basketball player
- William Avery, co-founder of W & T Avery Ltd.
- Sir William Beilby Avery (1854–1908), philatelist, son of William Avery, and senior partner of W & T Avery Ltd.
- William H. Avery (politician) (1911–2009), governor of Kansas
- William H. Avery (engineer) (1912–2004), American aeronautics engineer
- William Tecumsah Avery (1819–1880), former member of the United States House of Representatives
- William Waightstill Avery (1816–1864), member of the Congress of the Confederate States from North Carolina
- William B. Avery (1840–1894), American soldier and Medal of Honor recipient
