= 1960 Colombian parliamentary election =

Parliamentary elections were held in Colombia on 20 March 1960 to elect the Chamber of Representatives. Under the National Front agreement, only the Conservative Party and the Liberal Party were able to contest the elections, with 50% of the seats in both houses allocated to each party. As a result, the main contest at the elections was between factions within each party.

== Results ==
Party and faction		Votes	%	Seats	+/–
Colombian; Liberal; Party	Oficialistas	1,106,678	43.61	58	–
Colombian; Liberal; Party	Liberal Revolutionary Movement	354,560	13.97	18	–
Colombian; Liberal; Party	Others	17,165	0.68	0	–
Colombian; Liberal; Party	Total	1,478,403	58.26	76	+2
Colombian; Conservative; Party	Alzaospinistas	567,087	22.35	37	New
Colombian; Conservative; Party	Doctrinarios	446,393	17.59	38	–11
Colombian; Conservative; Party	Leyvistas	37,020	1.46	1	New
Colombian; Conservative; Party	Others	8,870	0.35	0	–
Colombian; Conservative; Party	Total	1,059,370	41.74	76	+2
Total		2,537,773	100.00	152	+4
Valid votes		2,537,773	99.81		
Invalid/blank votes		4,878	0.19		
Total votes		2,542,651	100.00		
Registered voters/turnout		4,397,541	57.82		
Source: Nohlen
