= 1964 Florida gubernatorial election =

- November 3, 1964
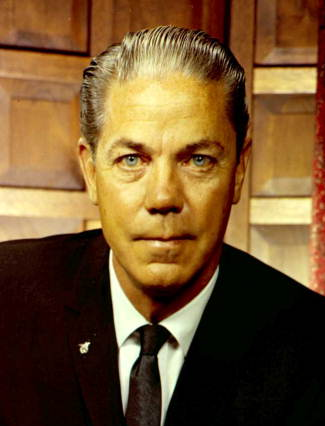

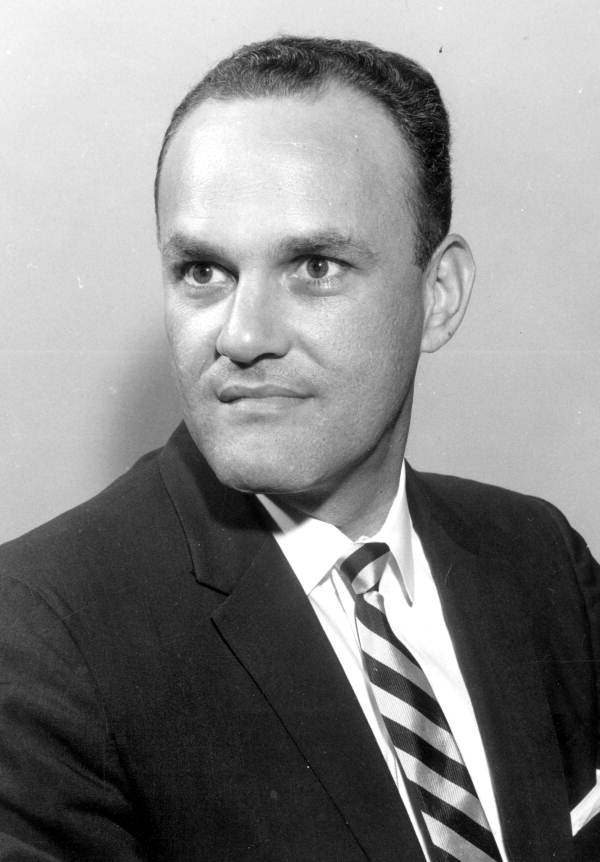
Nominee	W. Haydon Burns	Charles R. Holley
Party	Democratic	Republican
Popular vote	933,554	686,297
Percentage	56.12%	41.26%
- County results Burns: 50–60% 60–70% 70–80% 80–90% Holley: 50–60%
Governor before election
C. Farris Bryant
Democratic
Elected Governor
W. Haydon Burns
Democratic

The 1964 Florida gubernatorial election was held on November 3, 1964. Incumbent Democratic governor C. Farris Bryant was ineligible for a second consecutive full term under the 1885 State Constitution. Democratic nominee W. Haydon Burns defeated Republican nominee Charles R. Holley with 56.12% of the vote.

== Primary elections ==
Primary elections were held on May 5 and 26, 1964.

=== Democratic primary ===
33.4% of the voting age population participated in the Democratic primary.

==== Results ====
Democratic Primary Runoff by county Burns: 50–60%; 60–70%; 70–80%; 80–90%; >90%; High: 50–60%; 60–70%

Democratic primary results
Party	Candidate	Votes	%
Democratic	W. Haydon Burns	312,453	27.51
Democratic	Robert King High	207,280	18.25
Democratic	Scott Kelly	205,078	18.06
Democratic	Fred Bud Dickinson	184,865	16.28
Democratic	John E. Mathews	140,210	12.34
Democratic	Frederick B. Karl	85,953	7.57
Total votes		1,135,839	100.00

Democratic primary runoff results
Party	Candidate	Votes	%
Democratic	W. Haydon Burns	648,093	58.20
Democratic	Robert King High	465,547	41.80
Total votes		1,113,640	100.00

=== Republican primary ===
4% of the voting age population participated in the Republican primary.

==== Results ====
Republican primary results
Party	Candidate	Votes	%
Republican	Charles R. Holley	70,573	53.89
Republican	H. B. (Bob) Foster	33,563	25.63
Republican	Ken Folks	26,815	20.48
Total votes		130,951	100.00

== General election ==
=== Candidates ===
- W. Haydon Burns, Democratic
- Charles R. Holley, Republican

=== Results ===
1964 Florida gubernatorial election
Party	Candidate	Votes	%
Democratic	W. Haydon Burns	933,554	56.12%
Republican	Charles R. Holley	686,297	41.26%
Write-in		43,630	2.62%
Majority		247,257	14.86%
Turnout		1,663,481	100.00
Democratic hold			

== Works cited ==
- Morris, Allen (1965). The Florida Handbook, 1965-66. Tallahassee, FL: The Peninsular Publishing Company.
- Steed, Robert; Moreland, Laurence; Baker, Tod, eds. (1980). Party Politics in the South. Praeger Publishers. ISBN 0030565863.
