= Cecil H. Underwood =

American politician (1922–2008)

Cecil Underwood
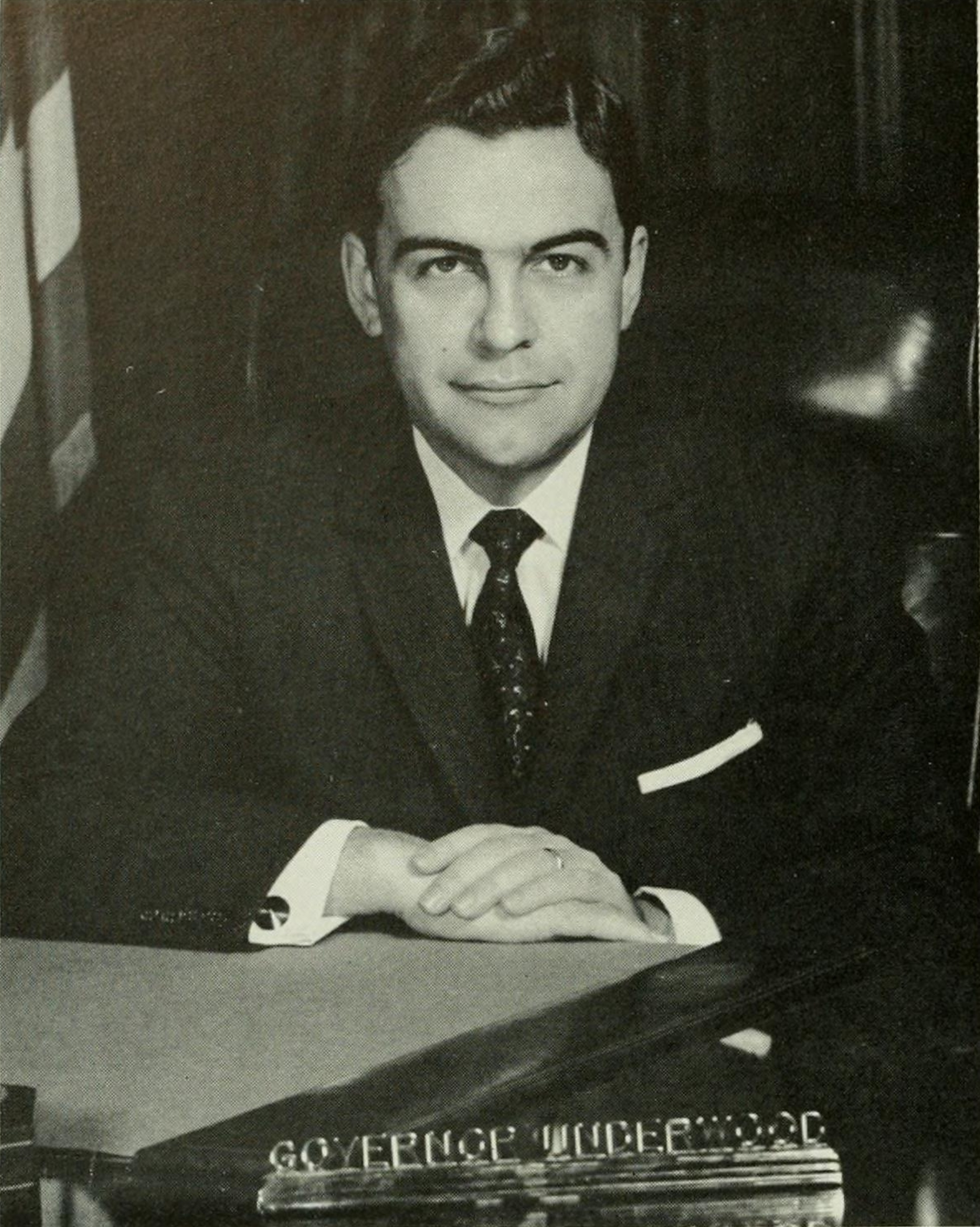
- Underwood from The Monticola (1959)

25th & 32nd Governor of West Virginia
- In office January 13, 1997 – January 15, 2001
- Lieutenant (Note: Title of Lieutenant Governor first established in 2000.): Earl Ray Tomblin
- Preceded by: Gaston Caperton
- Succeeded by: Bob Wise
- In office January 14, 1957 – January 16, 1961
- Preceded by: William C. Marland
- Succeeded by: Wally Barron

Member of the West Virginia House of Delegates from Tyler County
- In office December 1, 1944 – December 1, 1956
- Preceded by: Cecil Nichols
- Succeeded by: Sprigg Smith

Personal details
- Born: Cecil Harland Underwood; November 5, 1922 Josephs Mills, West Virginia, U.S.
- Died: November 24, 2008 (aged 86) Charleston, West Virginia, U.S.
- Resting place: Spring Hill Cemetery; Tyler, West Virginia
- Party: Republican
- Spouse: Hovah Hall (m. 1948; died 2004)
- Children: 3
- Profession: Educator

Military service
- Allegiance: United States
- Branch/service: United States Army
- Unit: Reserves
- Battles/wars: World War II

Cecil Harland Underwood (November 5, 1922 – November 24, 2008) was an American politician who served as the 25th and 32nd governor of West Virginia from 1957 to 1961, and again from 1997 to 2001. A member of the Republican Party, he was the youngest governor in the state's history when first elected in 1956 at age 34 and later became the oldest when elected to a non-consecutive second term in 1996 at age 74. His career spanned more than five decades, including multiple gubernatorial bids, legislative service, and roles in academia and business. Underwood was known for his work in civil rights, economic development, and tax reform.

== Early life and education ==
Underwood was born in Josephs Mills, West Virginia, to Della N. (née Forrester) and Silas Henry Underwood. Growing up during the Great Depression, he worked on farms to support his family.[6]

He graduated from Tyler Consolidated High School in 1939 and later enrolled at Salem University in Harrison County, where he was student body president and a member of Sigma Phi Epsilon fraternity. He earned his bachelor's degree in 1943.

During World War II, he served as an Army Reservist before returning to teach high school biology in St. Marys, West Virginia (1943–1946). He later pursued a master's degree from West Virginia University, which he completed in 1965.

== Early political career ==
At just 22 years old, Underwood launched his political career by winning a seat in the West Virginia House of Delegates in 1944. He served six consecutive terms (1944–1956) and became House Minority Leader in 1949, 1951, 1953, and 1955.

In addition to his political work, he was a college professor and administrator, teaching at Marietta College (1946–1950) and later serving as vice president of Salem College (1950–1956).

== First term as governor (1957–1961) ==
Underwood's 1956 election as Governor of West Virginia marked the first election of a Republican to the office since 1928. He had defeated Charleston Mayor John T. Copenhaver by only 7,200 votes in the primary, and enjoyed a decisive victory against Democratic U.S. Representative Robert Mollohan in the general election by 63,000 votes. Only a week prior to the election, it was discovered that Mollohan had received $20,000 and two cars from a coal operator on a strip mine at a male reformatory in Pruntytown while Mollohan was superintendent of the institution. Underwood had turned 34 years old only one day before the election, making him one of the youngest U.S. governors to have ever been elected.

Following the lead of Governor William C. Marland, the Democrat who preceded him in office, Underwood continued the desegregation of West Virginia schools without violent confrontation at all levels and was a supporter of civil rights legislation.

The previous governors since 1932 had all been Democrats. His first act as governor was to go on the new medium of television and inform every state employee that they were fired. He stated that this was the only way to destroy the corrupt "machine" system. He later advocated an organized civil service and retirement pension system, and provided temporary employment relief for low-income families.

Underwood was instrumental in the creation of the West Virginia Mental Health Department, and oversaw creation of the interstate highway in the state, He oversaw the last three executions in the state, all in 1959.

== Between governorships (1961–1996) ==
Because West Virginia's constitution prohibited governors from serving consecutive terms at that time, Underwood ran for the United States Senate in 1960, but was defeated by incumbent Democrat Jennings Randolph. He was nominated again for governor in 1964 but was defeated by Hulett C. Smith, and then lost the Republican primary for governor to Arch A. Moore Jr. in 1968. He was nominated again for governor in 1976, losing to Democrat Jay Rockefeller by 250,000 votes, which would become his largest defeat.

During the 1960s, he was named temporary chairman of the Republican National Convention and was once considered for the office of Vice President under Richard Nixon. Two weeks after losing the Senate race in 1960, Underwood went to work for the Island Creek Coal Company and Monsanto Chemical Company as well as forming his own land development company.

He was associated as well with the Software Valley Corporation in Morgantown, West Virginia. He continued his academic career by serving as President of Bethany College and instructor of political science at Marshall University. He also served as president of the National Association of State Councils on Vocational Education.

== Second term as governor (1997–2001) ==
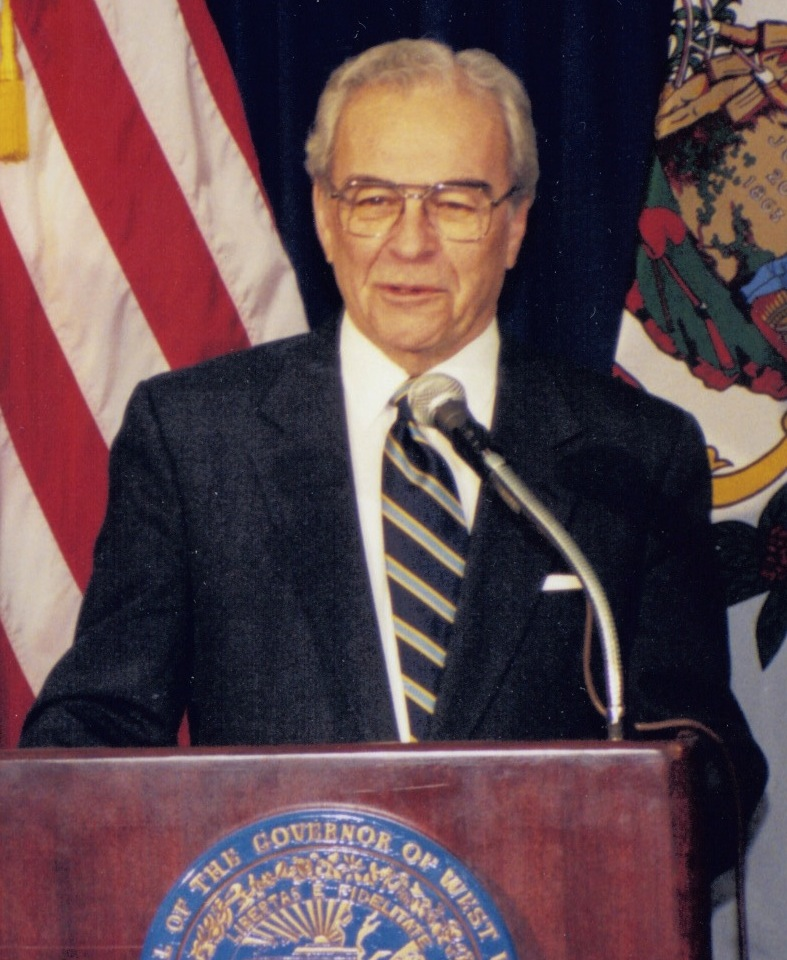
Underwood in 1998, during his second term as Governor

Underwood was again elected Governor of West Virginia in 1996 under the banner "Better Government, not Bigger Government", carrying 38 of the state's 55 counties and defeating astronaut Jon McBride and future congressman David McKinley.

During his governorship, he enabled the Governor's Commission of Fair Taxation, which was a thorough review of the state's tax structure. The Commission made numerous recommendations for improvement. He streamlined administrative costs from education and other government sectors.

In October 1999, Underwood was selected by the governors of the Appalachian states to serve as West Virginia's co-chairman for the Appalachian Regional Commission for 2000.

Underwood was the only sitting Republican governor defeated for re-election in 2000, narrowly losing to Democrat Bob Wise.

== Later years and death ==
After leaving office, Underwood largely withdrew from public life. His wife, Hovah, died in 2004 from complications of a stroke.

In March 2006, he suffered a minor stroke, followed by a major stroke in 2008, which left him unable to speak. He developed a severe blood infection later that year and was admitted to a nursing facility before returning home to Charleston.

On November 23, 2008, he was hospitalized with chest congestion and minor brain bleeding. He died the next day at Charleston Area Medical Center at age 86. His body was donated to Marshall University's Joan C. Edwards School of Medicine.

== Personal life ==
Underwood married Hovah Hall on July 25, 1948, at Knotts Methodist Church in Grantsville, West Virginia. The couple met while attending Salem College, where Hovah's sisters were Underwood’s classmates.

They had one son, two daughters, and six grandchildren.

Underwood was a lifelong Methodist.

== Notes ==
Political offices
Preceded by William C. Marland	Governor of West Virginia; 1957–1961	Succeeded by William Wallace Barron
Preceded by Gaston Caperton	Governor of West Virginia; 1997–2001	Succeeded by Bob Wise
Party political offices
Preceded by Rush D. Holt	Republican Party nominee for Governor of West Virginia; 1956	Succeeded by Harold E. Neely
Preceded by John D. Hoblitzell Jr.	Republican Party nominee for U.S. Senator from West Virginia (Class 2); 1960	Succeeded by Francis J. Love
Preceded by Harold E. Neely	Republican Party nominee for Governor of West Virginia; 1964	Succeeded by Arch A. Moore Jr.
Preceded by Arch A. Moore Jr.	Republican Party nominee for Governor of West Virginia; 1976	Succeeded by Arch A. Moore Jr.
Preceded by Cleve Benedict	Republican Party nominee for Governor of West Virginia; 1996, 2000	Succeeded by Monty Warner
