= 1960 Texas lieutenant gubernatorial election =

- November 8, 1960
Nominee	Ben Ramsey	Gilbert N. Harrison
Party	Democratic	Republican
Popular vote	1,615,506	573,585
Percentage	73.12%	25.96%
Lieutenant Governor before election
Ben Ramsey
Democratic
Elected Lieutenant Governor
Ben Ramsey
Democratic

The 1960 Texas lieutenant gubernatorial election was held on November 8, 1960, in order to elect the lieutenant governor of Texas. Incumbent Democratic lieutenant governor Ben Ramsey defeated Republican nominee Gilbert N. Harrison and Constitution nominee Philip Lee Eubank.

== General election ==
On election day, November 8, 1960, incumbent Democratic lieutenant governor Ben Ramsey won re-election by a margin of 1,041,921 votes against his foremost opponent Republican nominee Gilbert N. Harrison, thereby retaining Democratic control over the office of lieutenant governor. Ramsey was sworn in for his sixth term on January 17, 1961.

=== Results ===
Texas lieutenant gubernatorial election, 1960
Party	Candidate	Votes	%
Democratic	Ben Ramsey (incumbent)	1,615,506	73.12
Republican	Gilbert N. Harrison	573,585	25.96
Constitution	Philip Lee Eubank	20,439	0.92
Total votes		2,209,530	100.00
Democratic hold			
