= 1960 United States Senate election in West Virginia =

- November 8, 1960
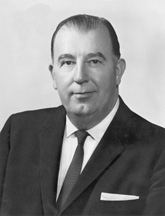

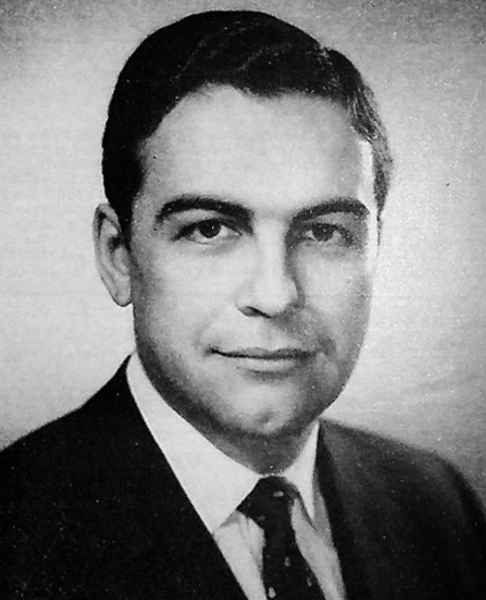
Nominee	Jennings Randolph	Cecil H. Underwood
Party	Democratic	Republican
Popular vote	458,355	369,935
Percentage	55.34%	44.66%
- County results Randolph: 50–60% 60–70% 70–80% 80–90% Underwood: 50–60% 60–70% 70–80%
U.S. senator before election
Jennings Randolph
Democratic
Elected U.S. Senator
Jennings Randolph
Democratic

The 1960 United States Senate election in West Virginia was held on November 8, 1960. Incumbent Democratic U.S. Senator Jennings Randolph won re-election to a full term, defeating Republican Governor Cecil H. Underwood in a landslide.

== Primary elections ==
Primary elections were held on May 10, 1960.

=== Democratic primary ===
==== Candidate ====
- Jennings Randolph, incumbent U.S. Senator

==== Results ====
Democratic Party primary results
Party	Candidate	Votes	%
Democratic	Jennings Randolph (incumbent)	275,064	100.00%
Total votes		275,064	100.00%

=== Republican primary ===
==== Candidate ====
- Cecil H. Underwood, incumbent Governor

==== Results ====
Republican Party primary results
Party	Candidate	Votes	%
Republican	Cecil H. Underwood	160,106	100.00%
Total votes		160,106	100.00%

== General election ==
=== Result ===
United States Senate election in West Virginia, 1960
Party	Candidate	Votes	%	±%
Democratic	Jennings Randolph (incumbent)	458,355	55.34%	
Republican	Cecil H. Underwood	369,935	44.66%	
Write-ins		2	0.00%	
Total votes		828,292	100.00%	
Democratic hold				

== See also ==
- 1960 United States Senate elections

== Bibliography ==
- Congressional Elections, 1946-1996. Washington, D.C.: Congressional Quarterly Inc. 1998. ISBN 1-56802-248-4.
