= Charles R. Holley =

American politician (1924–1981)

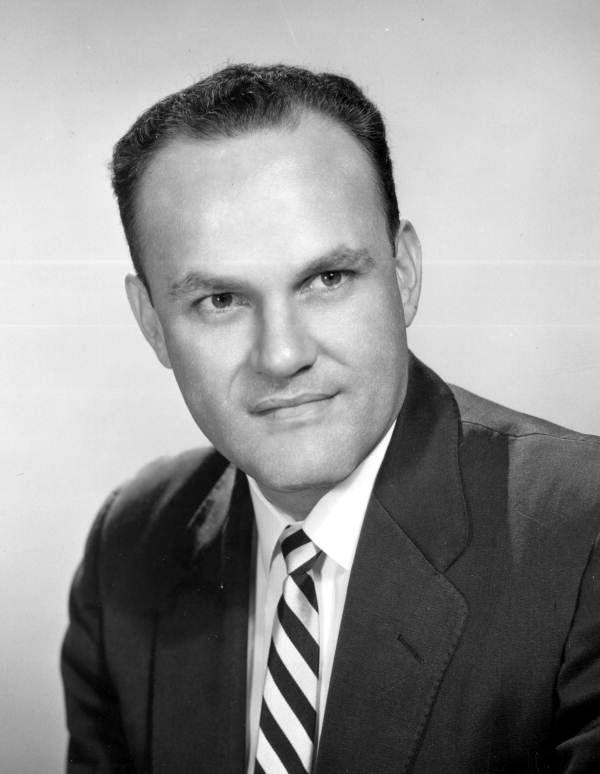
- Holley in 1963

Member of the Florida House of Representatives from the Pinellas County district
- In office 1960–1964

Personal details
- Born: November 11, 1924 Jacksonville, Florida, U.S.
- Died: March 15, 1981 (aged 56) Naples, Florida, U.S.
- Party: Republican
- Education: Duke University; University of Florida

Charles Richard Holley Sr. (November 11, 1924 – March 15, 1981) was an American lawyer, state legislator, and circuit court judge in the state of Florida. He was the Republican candidate for governor in 1964. He represented Pinellas County in the Florida House of Representatives from 1960 to 1964 and served as minority leader during part of that time.

== Early life ==
Holley was born on November 11, 1924, in Jacksonville, Florida. He attended Duke University where he received a bachelor's degree. He later attended the University of Florida, graduating with a law degree in 1950. He was admitted to the Florida Bar on June 6, 1950.

== Career ==
In 1962, he announced his candidacy for the chair of the Florida Republican Party. He challenged the constitutionality of a Florida law requiring candidates for elected political office to not be serving in an elected office that would have an overlapping term with the new office if they won.

He died on March 15, 1981, in Naples, Florida, aged 56.

Party political offices
| Preceded by George C. Petersen | Republican nominee for Governor of Florida; 1964 | Succeeded by Claude R. Kirk Jr. |
