= Wally Barron =

American politician (1911–2002)

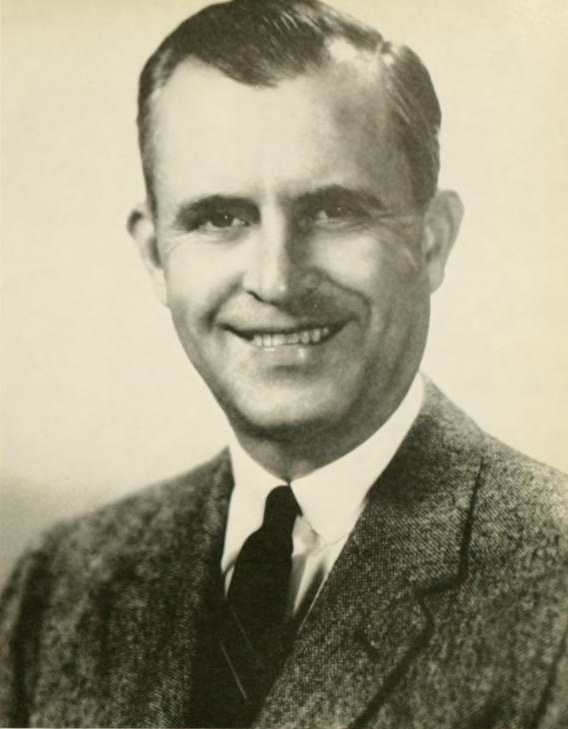

26th Governor of West Virginia
- In office January 16, 1961 – January 18, 1965
- Preceded by: Cecil H. Underwood
- Succeeded by: Hulett C. Smith

27th Attorney General of West Virginia
- In office January 14, 1957 – January 16, 1961
- Governor: Cecil H. Underwood
- Preceded by: John Fox
- Succeeded by: Donald Robertson

Personal details
- Born: William Wallace Barron; December 8, 1911 Elkins, West Virginia, U.S.
- Died: November 12, 2002 (aged 90) Charlotte, North Carolina, U.S.
- Party: Democratic
- Spouse: Opal Wilcox
- Education: Washington and Lee University (BA); West Virginia University (LLB)

Military service
- Allegiance: United States
- Branch/service: United States Army
- Rank: Sergeant
- Battles/wars: World War II

William Wallace "Wally" Barron (December 8, 1911 – November 12, 2002) was an American Democratic politician in West Virginia. He was the state's 26th governor of West Virginia from 1961 to 1965, serving one term.

== Life and career ==
He was born in Elkins, West Virginia. He attended Washington and Lee University and the West Virginia University Law School. During World War II, he served in the United States Army. In 1949, he was elected mayor of Elkins. He became a member of the West Virginia House of Delegates in 1950 and was re-elected in 1952. He resigned his seat when appointed as Liquor Control Commissioner by Governor William C. Marland subsequent to the 1952 election. He was nominated to Attorney General in 1956.

In 1960, he was elected governor of West Virginia and continued the clean government and civil rights reforms that had been instituted by his predecessor, Cecil H. Underwood.

He died on November 12, 2002, in Charlotte, North Carolina.

== Corruption trial and prison ==
On August 30, 1968, Barron was acquitted of federal charges concerning alleged money kickbacks and rigged state contract schemes in which he and several of his associates were involved. It was later realized that Barron and his wife, Opal Barron, had bribed the jury foreman. Barron was indicted, pleaded guilty and was sentenced to 25 years in prison, albeit this was reduced to 12 years. He served four years of his sentence.

== See also ==
- Virginia Mae Brown

Legal offices
Preceded by John Fox	Attorney General of West Virginia; 1957–1961	Succeeded by Donald Robertson
Party political offices
Preceded by John G. Fox	Democratic nominee for West Virginia Attorney General; 1956	Succeeded by C. Donald Robertson
Preceded by Bob Mollohan	Democratic nominee for Governor of West Virginia; 1960	Succeeded by Hulett C. Smith
Political offices
Preceded by Cecil H. Underwood	Governor of West Virginia; 1961–1965	Succeeded by Hulett C. Smith
