= Hulett C. Smith =

American politician (1918–2012)

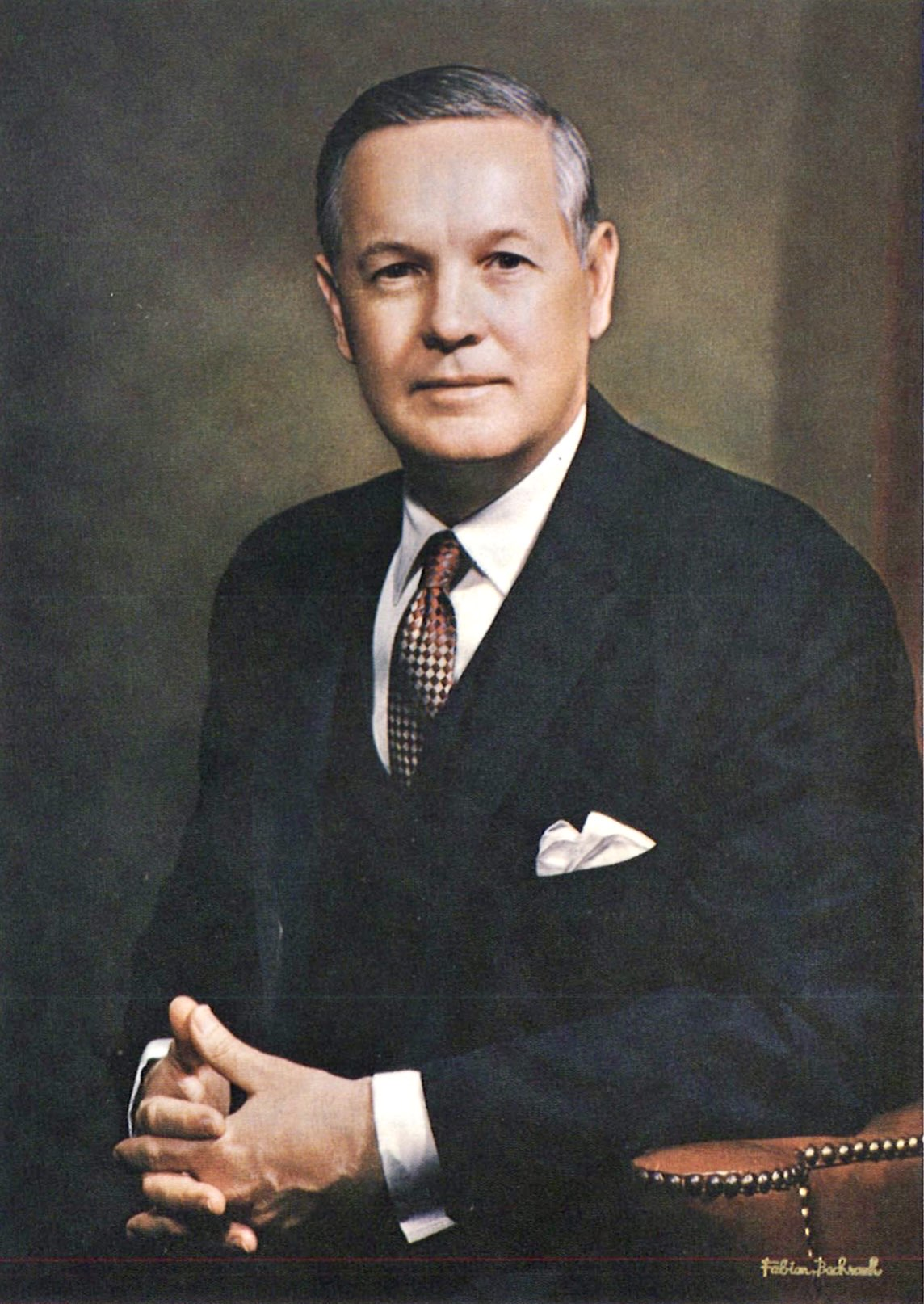
- Official portrait, 1965

27th Governor of West Virginia
- In office January 18, 1965 – January 13, 1969
- Preceded by: Wally Barron
- Succeeded by: Arch Moore

Chair of the West Virginia Democratic Party
- In office June 9, 1956 – October 11, 1961
- Preceded by: J. Howard Myers
- Succeeded by: Robert McDonough

Personal details
- Born: Hulett Carlson Smith; October 21, 1918 Beckley, West Virginia, U.S.
- Died: January 15, 2012 (aged 93) Scottsdale, Arizona, U.S.
- Party: Democratic
- Spouses: Mary Alice Tieche; Nancy Pat Smith
- Children: Paul; Mark; Hulett Jr.; Carolyn; Christy; Suzaine
- Parent: Joe L. Smith (father)

Military service
- Allegiance: United States
- Branch/service: United States Navy
- Rank: Lieutenant
- Battles/wars: World War II

Hulett Carlson Smith (October 21, 1918 – January 15, 2012) was an American politician who served as the 27th governor of West Virginia from 1965 to 1969.

== Biography ==
The son of West Virginia Congressman Joe L. Smith, Hulett C. Smith was born in Beckley, West Virginia. Smith attended public schools in Raleigh County, and graduated with honors from the University of Pennsylvania's Wharton School of Finance and Administration, where he majored in economics. Following his graduation from the Wharton School, Smith worked in the insurance business and at his family's radio station. During World War II he served in the U.S. Navy, rising to the rank of lieutenant, and ultimately became a lieutenant commander in the U.S. Naval Reserve.

Active in community service and civic affairs, he served as president of The West Virginia Junior Chamber of Commerce (1949–1950). He was the chairman of the West Virginia Democratic Party from 1956 to 1961. During this time Smith co-founded Bald Knob Ski Slopes, the predecessor to Winterplace Ski Resort. He was elected governor in 1964 and served for one term. Due to term limits in place at that time, he was unable to run for a second term in 1968. After his term as governor, Smith served as a Presidential elector in 1992; he was also on the slate of George McGovern's electors in 1972.

In 1968, Smith responded to the bombing of the gymnasium at Bluefield State College by offering a $5,000 reward for information leading to conviction of the culprits.

Smith died in Scottsdale, Arizona aged 93.

Party political offices
Preceded by Wally Barron	Democratic nominee for Governor of West Virginia; 1964	Succeeded by James Sprouse
Political offices
Preceded by Wally Barron	Governor of West Virginia; 1965–1969	Succeeded by Arch Moore
