= 1950 Rhode Island Senate election =

- November 7, 1950

All 44 seats in the Rhode Island Senate 23 seats needed for a majority
	Majority party	Minority party
Party	Democratic	Republican
Seats after	22	22
Popular vote	176,942	122,275
Percentage	58.95%	40.74%
- Democratic: 70–80% 60–70% 50–60% 40–50% Republican: 60–70% 50–60%

The 1950 Rhode Island Senate election took place on Tuesday, November 7, 1950, to elect 44 representatives to serve two-year terms in the Rhode Island Senate. The Democratic Party primaries were held on September 18, 1950, and the Republican Party primaries were held on September 27, 1950. Nearly every municipality elected one senator, save for Pawtucket and Providence, which elected two and five respectively due to their higher populations.

The election took place in tandem with elections for the governor, lieutenant governor, U.S. House, state house, and a U.S. Senate special election.

Until 2003, the presiding officer of the Senate was the lieutenant governor, when the office of the President of the Rhode Island Senate was established. The incumbent Democratic lieutenant governor, John S. McKiernan, was re-elected in the stimultaneous lieutenant gubernatorial election with 54.09% of the vote.

== General election summary ==
Source for general election results:

=== Results by county ===
County	Democrats			Republicans			Independents			Votes		Seats	
County	Votes	%	Seats	Votes	%	Seats	Vote	%	Seats	#	%	#	%
Bristol	6,927	57.54	2	5,112	42.46	1	—	—	—	12,039	4.01	3	6.82
Kent	15,877	51.32	2	15,056	48.66	3	6	0.02	0	30,939	10.31	5	11.36
Newport	9,237	53.91	1	7,896	46.09	5	—	—	—	17,133	5.71	6	13.64
Providence	137,771	61.60	15	85,896	38.40	6	—	—	—	223,667	74.52	21	47.73
Washington	7,130	43.52	2	8,315	50.75	7	938	5.73	0	16,383	5.46	9	20.46
Total	176,942	58.95	22	122,275	40.74	22	944	0.31	0	300,161	100%	44	100%

=== Results by municipality ===
Municipality	Democrats			Republicans			Independents			Total		
Municipality	Candidate	Votes	%	Candidate	Votes	%	Candidate	Votes	%	Votes	Maj.	Mrg.
Barrington	Migliaccio	1,636	42.53	Kingsley	2,211	57.47	—	—	—	3,847	−575	−14.95
Bristol	Coggeshall	3,109	65.22	McKenna	1,658	34.78	—	—	—	4,767	+1,451	+30.44
Burrillville	Griffin	1,546	40.69	McGuinness	2,253	59.31	—	—	—	3,799	−707	−18.61
Central Falls	Caouette	6,353	67.96	LaPierre	2,995	32.04	—	—	—	9,348	+3,358	+35.92
Charlestown	Cavanaugh Jr.	312	43.76	Wilson	401	56.24	—	—	—	713	−89	−12.48
Coventry	Roche	2,259	52.28	Anderson	2,062	47.72	—	—	—	4,321	+197	+4.56
Cranston	Kennedy	10,276	48.06	Brower	11,106	51.94	—	—	—	21,382	−830	−3.88
Cumberland	Brady	3,854	68.15	Shunney	1,801	31.85	—	—	—	5,655	+2,053	+36.30
East Greenwich	Reed	1,063	49.56	Proctor	1,082	50.44	—	—	—	2,145	−19	−0.89
East Providence	Coffey	7,463	52.45	Shippee	6,767	47.55	—	—	—	14,230	+696	+4.89
Exeter	Pratt	196	42.98	Kenyon	260	57.02	—	—	—	456	−64	−14.04
Foster	Harrington	266	37.62	Knight	441	62.38	—	—	—	707	−175	−24.75
Glocester	Mason	744	48.88	Greenhalgh	778	51.12	—	—	—	1,522	−34	−2.23
Hopkinton	Murphy	552	37.78	Maine	909	62.22	—	—	—	1,461	−357	−24.44
Jamestown	Lyons	542	46.13	Head Jr.	633	53.87	—	—	—	1,175	−91	−7.74
Johnston	Pezzullo	3,322	65.94	Constantino	1,716	34.06	—	—	—	5,038	+1,606	+31.88
Lincoln	Davies	2,623	52.85	Smart	2,340	47.15	—	—	—	4,963	+283	+5.70
Little Compton	Chaves	182	31.71	Sylvia	392	68.29	—	—	—	574	−210	−36.59
Middletown	Arruda	583	39.05	Plummer	910	60.95	—	—	—	1,493	−327	−21.90
Narragansett	Maine	426	39.37	Westlake	656	60.63	—	—	—	1,082	−230	−21.26
Newport	Murray	6,217	61.15	Andrews Jr.	3,949	38.85	—	—	—	10,166	+2,268	+22.31
New Shoreham	Sprague	209	43.00	Lewis	263	54.12	Sprague	14	2.88	486	−54	−11.11
North Kingstown	Orme	1,155	38.58	Donnelly	1,839	61.42	—	—	—	2,994	−684	−22.85
North Providence	Sgambato	4,118	66.56	Ponton	2,069	33.44	—	—	—	6,187	+2,049	+33.12
North Smithfield	Dyndur	855	37.97	Kilroy	1,397	62.03	—	—	—	2,252	−542	−24.07
Pawtucket 1	Beaucage	10,169	60.23	Evans	6,714	39.77	—	—	—	16,883	+3,455	+20.46
Pawtucket 2	McCaughey	10,501	65.01	Marchand	5,651	34.99	—	—	—	16,152	+4,850	+30.03
Portsmouth	Levesque	914	49.11	Sherman	947	50.89	—	—	—	1,861	−33	−1.77
Providence 1	Lioht	10,391	58.16	Adler	7,475	41.84	—	—	—	17,866	+2,916	+16.32
Providence 2	Iacobucci	16,006	78.46	Mallinson	4,395	21.54	—	—	—	20,401	+11,611	+56.91
Providence 3	Luongo	12,427	57.16	DiLuglio	9,315	42.84	—	—	—	21,742	+3,112	+14.31
Providence 4	McWeeney	10,954	72.74	Lyman	4,106	27.26	—	—	—	15,060	+6,848	+45.47
Providence 5	McCabe	11,576	64.12	Mullaney	6,479	35.88	—	—	—	18,055	+5,097	+28.23
Richmond	Burdick	306	39.43	Perreault	470	60.57	—	—	—	776	−164	−21.13
Scituate	Moan Jr.	431	40.36	Hall	637	59.64	—	—	—	1,068	−206	−19.29
Smithfield	Harris	1,495	54.38	Gaisford	1,254	45.62	—	—	—	2,749	+241	+8.77
South Kingstown	Carr	1,744	53.27	Cirwein	1,530	46.73	—	—	—	3,274	+214	+6.54
Tiverton	Raftery	799	42.86	Douglas	1,065	57.14	—	—	—	1,864	−266	−14.27
Warren	Smith	2,182	63.71	Mondina	1,243	36.29	—	—	—	3,425	+939	+27.42
Warwick	Dunn	7,463	44.96	Sweeney	9,138	55.04	—	—	—	16,601	−1,675	−10.09
West Greenwich	Hoxsie	192	46.72	Brown	213	51.82	Hoxsie	6	1.46	411	−21	−5.11
West Warwick	Archambault	4,900	65.67	Smith	2,561	34.33	—	—	—	7,461	+2,339	+31.35
Westerly	Santoro	2,230	43.38	Lenihan	1,987	38.65	Macomber	924	17.97	5,141	+243	+4.73
Woonsocket	Smith	12,401	66.64	Leduc	6,207	33.36	—	—	—	18,608	+6,194	+33.29
