= General Holland =

General Holland may refer to:

- Arthur Holland (British Army officer) (1862–1927), British Army lieutenant general
- Charles R. Holland (born 1946), U.S. Air Force general
- Diana M. Holland (fl. 1990s–2020s), U.S. Army major general
- Leonard Holland (1916–1999), U.S. Army major general
