= Joseph A. Doorley Jr. =

American politician (1930–2022)

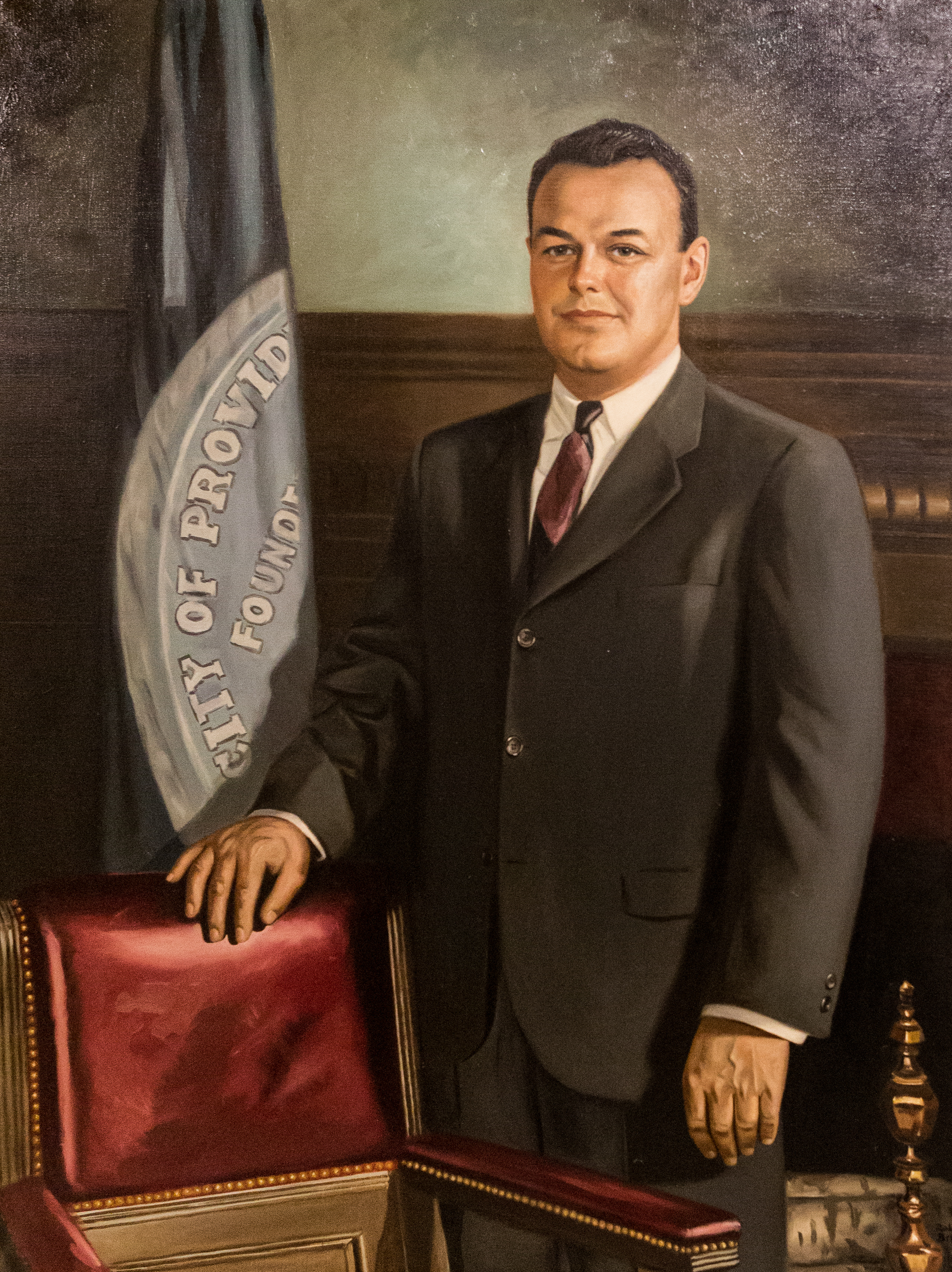

31st Mayor of Providence
- In office January 5, 1965 – January 6, 1975
- Preceded by: Walter H. Reynolds
- Succeeded by: Vincent A. Cianci Jr.

Member of the Providence City Council
- In office January 1963 – January 5, 1965

Personal details
- Born: Joseph Aloysius Doorley Jr. October 12, 1930 Providence, Rhode Island, U.S.
- Died: July 31, 2022 (aged 91) Narragansett, Rhode Island, U.S.
- Party: Democratic
- Spouse: Claire Walsh (m. 1953, divorced) Marilyn Joan Donnelly (died 2010)
- Children: 6
- Education: University of Notre Dame (AB); Boston College (JD)

Joseph Aloysius Doorley Jr. (October 12, 1930 – July 31, 2022) was an American lawyer and politician who served as mayor of Providence, Rhode Island, from 1965 to 1975. At the time of his election, he was the youngest mayor in the city's history. Doorley served as mayor during a time of economic decline and civil unrest.

== Early life ==
Joseph Aloysius Doorley, Jr., was born in the Mount Pleasant section of Providence, Rhode Island, on October 12, 1930, to Joseph A. Doorley, Sr., and Nora Cannon Doorley. Doorley's father was a Providence city fireman, and Roman Catholic. Joseph Jr. attended the parish school of Blessed Sacrament Church and was a member of the boys choir there. His mother died in March 1936.

Doorley graduated from LaSalle Academy in 1949 and graduated 'cum laude' from University of Notre Dame. From 1953 to 1955, Doorley taught civics, algebra, and English full-time at his alma mater, LaSalle Academy. Starting in 1955, he taught days at LaSalle while commuting to Boston College Law School to take night classes.

Shortly after opening his law practice, Doorley served on the staff of Governor John A. Notte Jr. Doorley served on the Providence City Council starting in 1962.

== Mayor of Providence ==
Doorley came into the mayorship after Rhode Island's Democratic political machine broke with mayor Walter H. Reynolds and put its support behind the young councilman and lawyer. Doorley beat Republican opponent Charles A. Kilvert by a wide margin. At the time he was inaugurated on January 4, 1965, he was the youngest mayor in the history of the city of Providence.

Doorley was a rising star in the Democratic Party and in 1970 he ran for national party chairman. Providence under Doorley early years office was one of the first cities to join the federal Model Cities Program and integrate its schools. Doorley became known for his frugal management style. Doorley's cost-cutting measures earned him the nickname "No Dough Joe". He was widely expected to run for higher office.

However, Doorley's time as mayor was also marked by desperate economic troubles. Following World War II, the city's population fell from 248,000 to 179,000 as people moved from Providence to the suburbs. Many large downtown department stores closed, and urban renewal money from President Lyndon Johnson's Great Society program eventually ran out.

Some of Doorley's accomplishments as mayor included:

- Constructed four high-rise towers for the Providence Housing Authority
- Pushed for fair-housing laws and antipoverty programs.
- Built a 30-story Hospital Trust Tower
- Built a $28 million Ambulatory Patient Care building for Rhode Island Hospital

In 1969, after a concert by Sly and the Family Stone at the Rhode Island Auditorium was followed by a riot, Doorley banned all rock concerts in Providence; the ban only lasted for a few months. Ironically, after the Civic Center was built a few years later, Doorley needed to encourage rock concerts to come to Providence.

=== Civic Center ===
The signature achievement of Doorley's tenure was the Providence Civic Center. After voters refused a statewide bond issue in 1968 to pay for a civic center, Doorley pushed for a special referendum in Providence in 1969, which passed. When more money was needed, Dooley pushed for another referendum in 1971. The Civic Center was so closely associated with Doorley that the press called it "Doorley's Dream". The Center became a focus of a corruption investigation in 1973. The director of the Center was convicted of soliciting a $1,000 bribe from a concert promoter. The lead investigator for this case was assistant attorney general Vincent "Buddy" Cianci, who used the case as a platform to run for mayor against Doorley on an anti-corruption platform.

By 1973, Doorley had lost favor with the state Democratic Party leaders, as the Democratic City Committee refused to endorse his 1974 bid for re-election. Doorley faced three Democratic challengers in the primary, winning by about 2,000 votes. Many of the dissatisfied anti-Doorley Democrats defected to support Republican Cianci, helping him win the 1974 mayoral election.

== Later life ==
In 1978, Doorley ran for Governor of Rhode Island as an independent, challenging incumbent Democrat J. Joseph Garrahy. Doorley would receive just over 6% of the vote as Garrahy would be re-elected in a landslide.

Later in life, Doorley moved to Pompano Beach, Florida, but subsequently returned to Rhode Island, living in Narragansett. He was married to Marilyn Joan Donnelly until her death in 2010. He had six children from a former marriage with Claire Walsh.

June 11, 2012, was declared "Joe Doorley Day" by the Rhode Island General Assembly and a municipal complex at 444 Westminster Street was named in his honor.

Doorley died at his home in Narrgansett on July 31, 2022, at the age of 91.
