= 1960 Rhode Island gubernatorial election =

- November 8, 1960
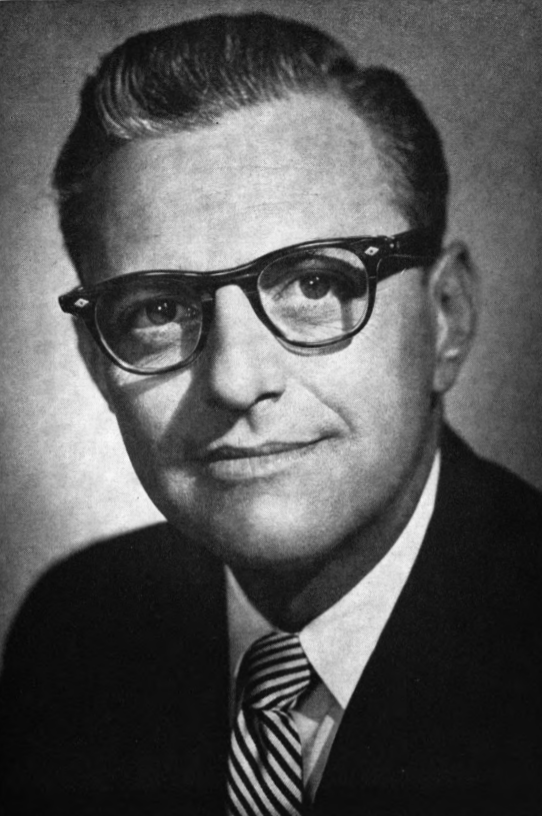

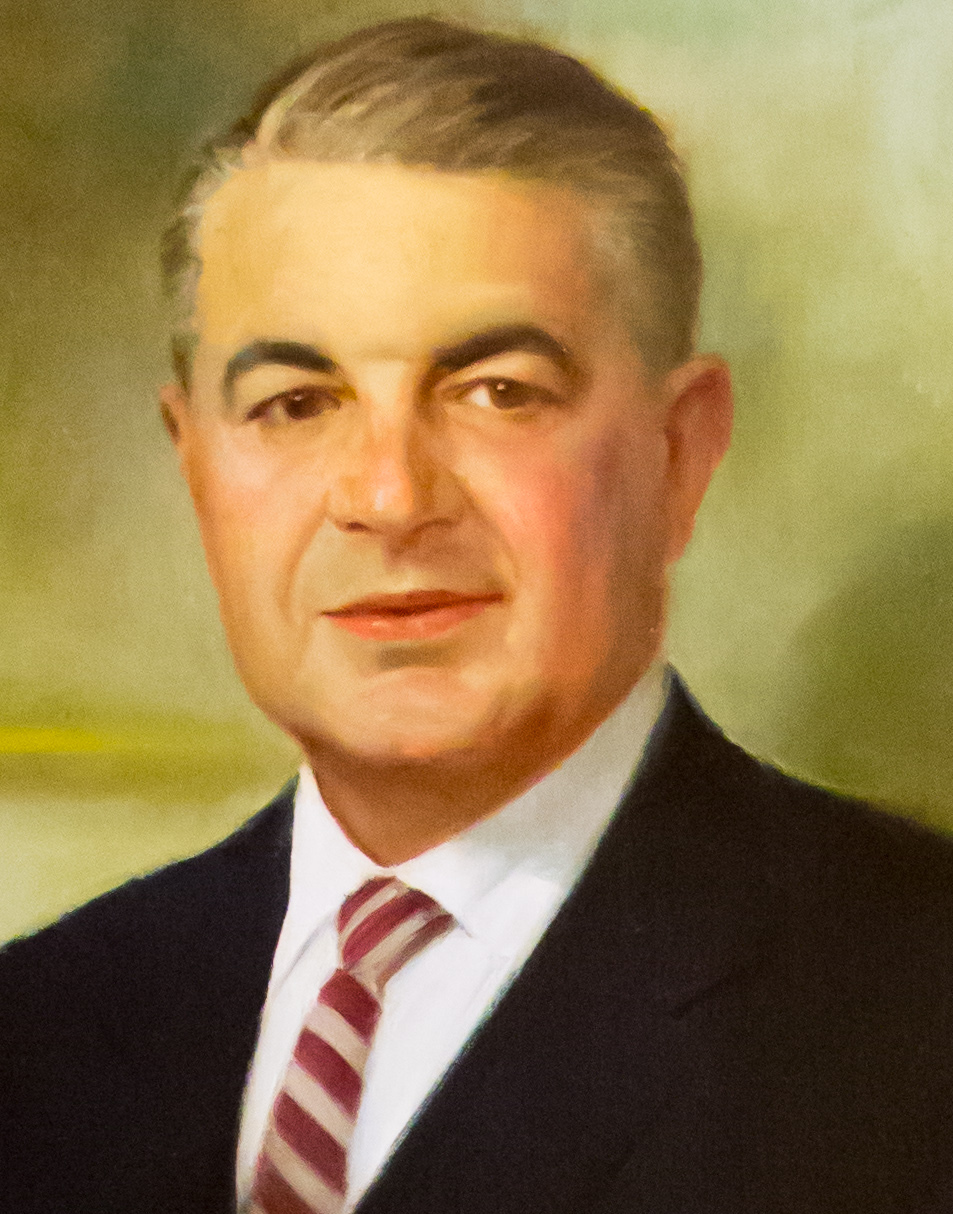
Nominee	John A. Notte Jr.	Christopher Del Sesto
Party	Democratic	Republican
Popular vote	227,318	174,044
Percentage	56.64%	43.36%
- Notte: 50–60% 60–70% 70–80% Del Sesto: 50–60% 60–70%
Governor before election
Christopher Del Sesto
Republican
Elected Governor
John A. Notte Jr.
Democratic

The 1960 Rhode Island gubernatorial election was held on November 8, 1960. Democratic nominee John A. Notte Jr. defeated incumbent Republican Christopher Del Sesto with 56.64% of the vote.

== Primary elections ==
Primary elections were held on September 28, 1960.

=== Democratic primary ===
==== Candidates ====
- John A. Notte Jr., incumbent lieutenant governor
- Armand H. Cote, former lieutenant governor

==== Results ====
Democratic primary results
Party	Candidate	Votes	%
Democratic	John A. Notte Jr.	73,607	56.27
Democratic	Armand H. Cote	57,200	43.73
Total votes		130,807	100.00

== General election ==
=== Candidates ===
- John A. Notte Jr., Democratic
- Christopher Del Sesto, Republican

=== Results ===
1960 Rhode Island gubernatorial election
Party	Candidate	Votes	%	±%
Democratic	John A. Notte Jr.	227,318	56.64%	
Republican	Christopher Del Sesto (incumbent)	174,044	43.36%	
Majority		53,274		
Turnout		401,362		
Democratic gain from Republican		Swing		

==== By county ====
	John Notte Democratic		Christopher Del Sesto Republican		Others	
County	Votes	%	Votes	%	Votes	%
Bristol	9,432	51.0%	9,048	49.0%	0	0.0%
Kent	27,322	50.2%	27,083	49.8%	0	0.0%
Newport	15,207	56.0%	11,928	44.0%	0	0.0%
Providence	164,021	59.2%	113,270	40.8%	0	0.0%
Washington	11,336	47.1%	12,715	52.9%	1	0.01%

Counties that flipped from Republican to Democratic

- Bristol
- Kent
- Newport
