= 1958 Rhode Island gubernatorial election =

- November 4, 1958
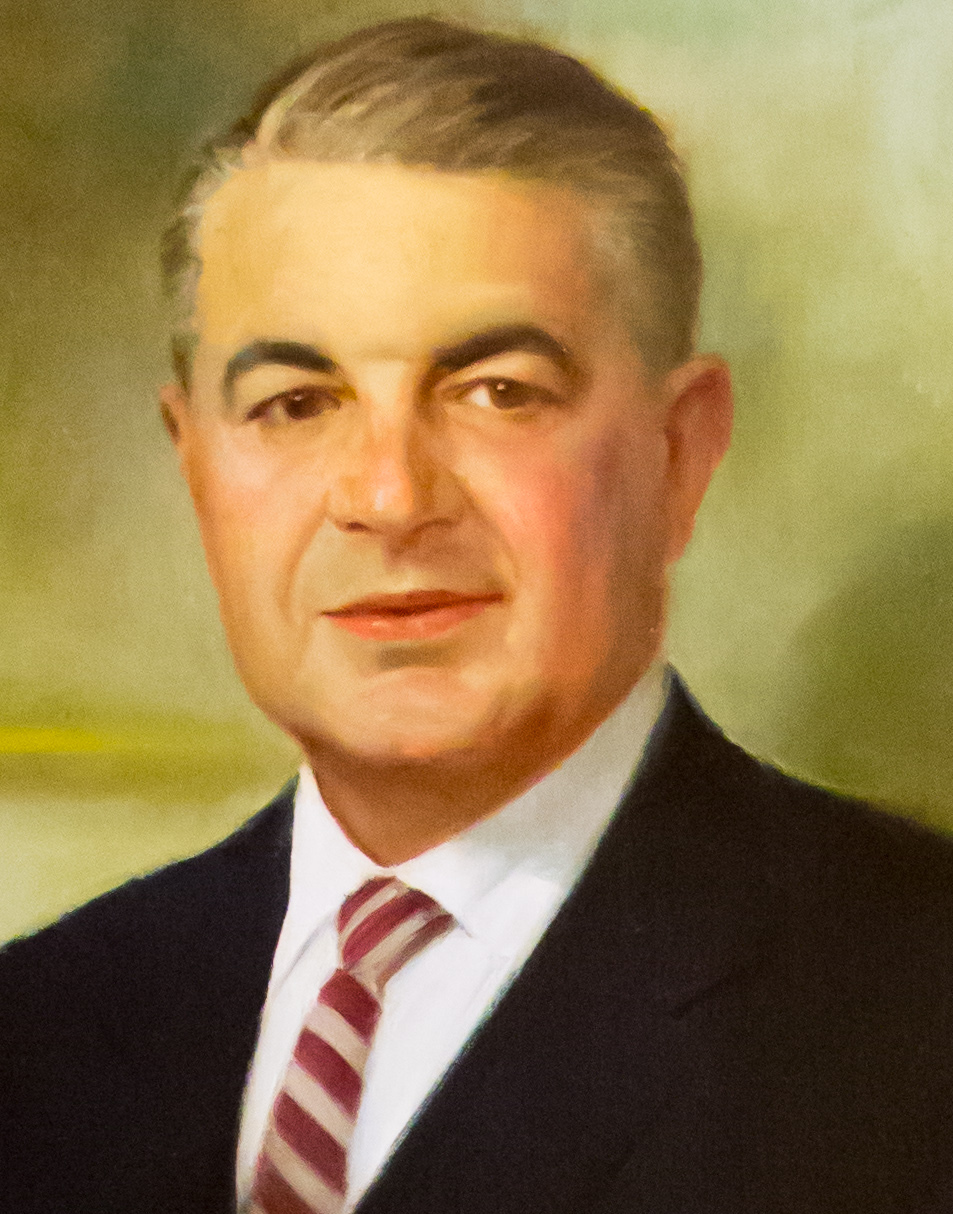

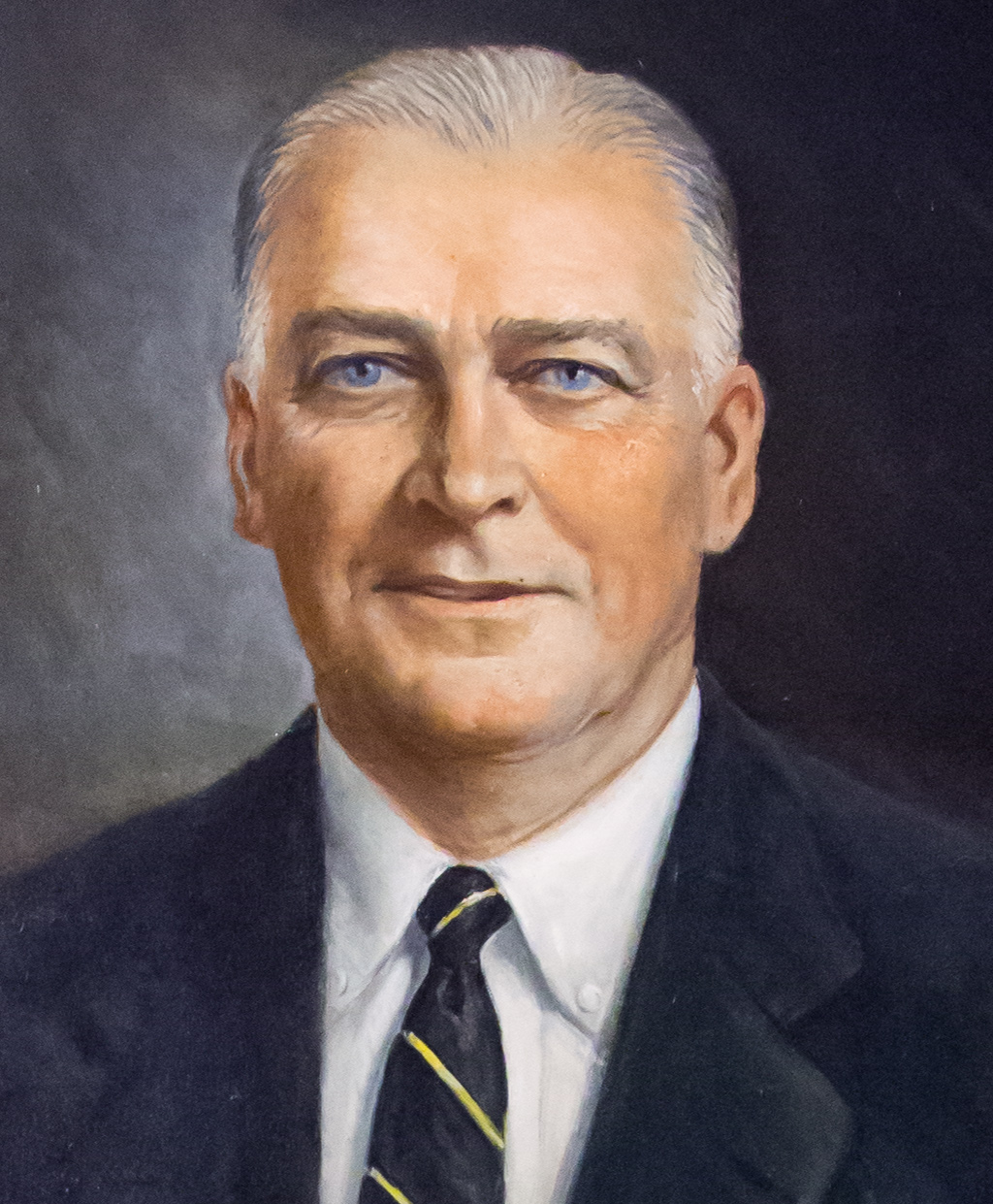
| Nominee | Christopher Del Sesto | Dennis J. Roberts |
| Party | Republican | Democratic |
| Popular vote | 176,505 | 170,275 |
| Percentage | 50.90% | 49.10% |
- Del Sesto: 50–60% 60–70% 70–80% Roberts: 50–60% 60–70%
Governor before election
Dennis J. Roberts
Democratic
Elected Governor
Christopher Del Sesto
Republican

The 1958 Rhode Island gubernatorial election was held on November 4, 1958. In a rematch of the controversially decided 1956 election, Republican nominee Christopher Del Sesto defeated Democratic incumbent Dennis J. Roberts with 50.90% of the vote.

Primary elections were held on September 17, 1958. Roberts survived a primary challenge from Lieutenant Governor Armand H. Cote with 56.1% of the vote.

== Democratic primary ==
=== Candidates ===
- Dennis J. Roberts, incumbent Governor since 1951
- Armand H. Cote, Lieutenant Governor of Rhode Island

=== Results ===
Democratic primary results
| Party | Candidate | Votes | % |
|---|---|---|---|
| Democratic | Dennis J. Roberts (incumbent) | 53,121 | 56.12 |
| Democratic | Armand H. Cote | 41,536 | 43.88 |
| Total votes | | 94,657 | 100.00 |

== General election ==
=== Candidates ===
- Christopher Del Sesto, former director of the state Office of Price Administration and nominee for Governor in 1956 (Republican)
- Dennis J. Roberts, incumbent Governor since 1951 (Democratic)

=== Results ===
1958 Rhode Island gubernatorial election
| Party | Candidate | Votes | % | ±% |
|---|---|---|---|---|
| Republican | Christopher Del Sesto | 176,505 | 50.90% | |
| Democratic | Dennis J. Roberts (incumbent) | 170,275 | 49.10% | |
| Majority | | 6,230 | | |
| Turnout | | 346,780 | | |
| Republican gain from Democratic | | Swing | | |
