= Walter H. Reynolds =

Mayor of Providence, Rhode Island, US

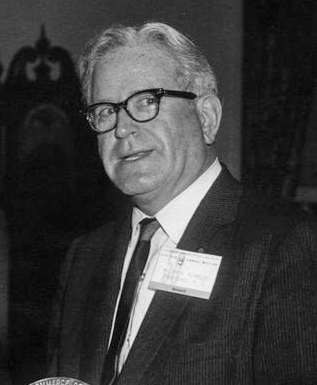
- Reynolds in 1962

30th Mayor of Providence
- In office January 1951 – January 1965
- Preceded by: Dennis J. Roberts
- Succeeded by: Joseph A. Doorley Jr.

Personal details
- Born: January 22, 1901 Providence, Rhode Island, U.S.
- Died: April 7, 1987 (aged 86) Westerly, Rhode Island, U.S.
- Resting place: St. Ann's Cemetery, Cranston
- Party: Democratic

Walter H. "Barney" Reynolds (January 22, 1901 – April 7, 1987), was an American politician who served seven consecutive terms as 30th Mayor of Providence, Rhode Island, totaling fourteen years of service. He served from 1951 until 1965.

== Early life ==
Reynolds was born in the "Irish End" of Providence's Federal Hill neighborhood, to Bernard and Catherine Reynolds. He attended St. Mary's Elementary School, the old English High School, and later the former St. Mary's Commercial High School. He worked for the Western Electric Company from 1922 to 1933. He never married.

== Political career ==
Reynolds served as administrative assistant to Mayor Dennis J. Roberts. He became budget officer in 1943, and finance director in 1947. When Roberts ran for governor in 1950, Reynolds entered the mayor's race against Republican Robert E. Burns. Despite never having held elective office before, Reynolds won the election with 56,092 votes to Burns' 23,395. Reynolds was elected to office a total of seven consecutive terms.

His accomplishments as mayor included:

- The three-man Bureau of Police and Fire was replaced with a Public Safety Commissioner
- Olneyville Expressway was completed
- A system to prevent parking fraud for state workers
- A new zoning code was developed
- West River Industrial Park was built
- New fire stations were built in 1953
- A new central library was dedicated in 1954
- Expanded street construction relieved traffic congestion
- Stricter housing codes were enforced
- Construction of the Fox Point Hurricane Barrier was begun after Hurricane Carol struck the area in 1954; the barrier was not completed until 1966.
- Financial aid to public schools was increased
- Six new elementary schools were built
- A master plan for the development of downtown was prepared, but it was not implemented
- The Providence Human Relations Commission was established

In 1964, Reynolds lost favor with Democratic city chairman Lawrence P. McGarry, Rhode Island's most influential party boss. McGarry backed the young city councilman Joseph A. Doorley Jr. in the 1964 Mayoral election, and Reynolds' political career was over.

== Honors and legacy ==
He was inducted into the Rhode Island Heritage Hall of Fame in 1985. Reynolds received honorary degrees from Brown University and Bryant College.

In 1977, the Fox Point Hurricane Barrier was named in Reynolds's honor.

Political offices
Preceded by Dennis J. Roberts	Mayor of Providence; 1951–1965	Succeeded by Joseph A. Doorley Jr.
