= Christopher Del Sesto =

American politician

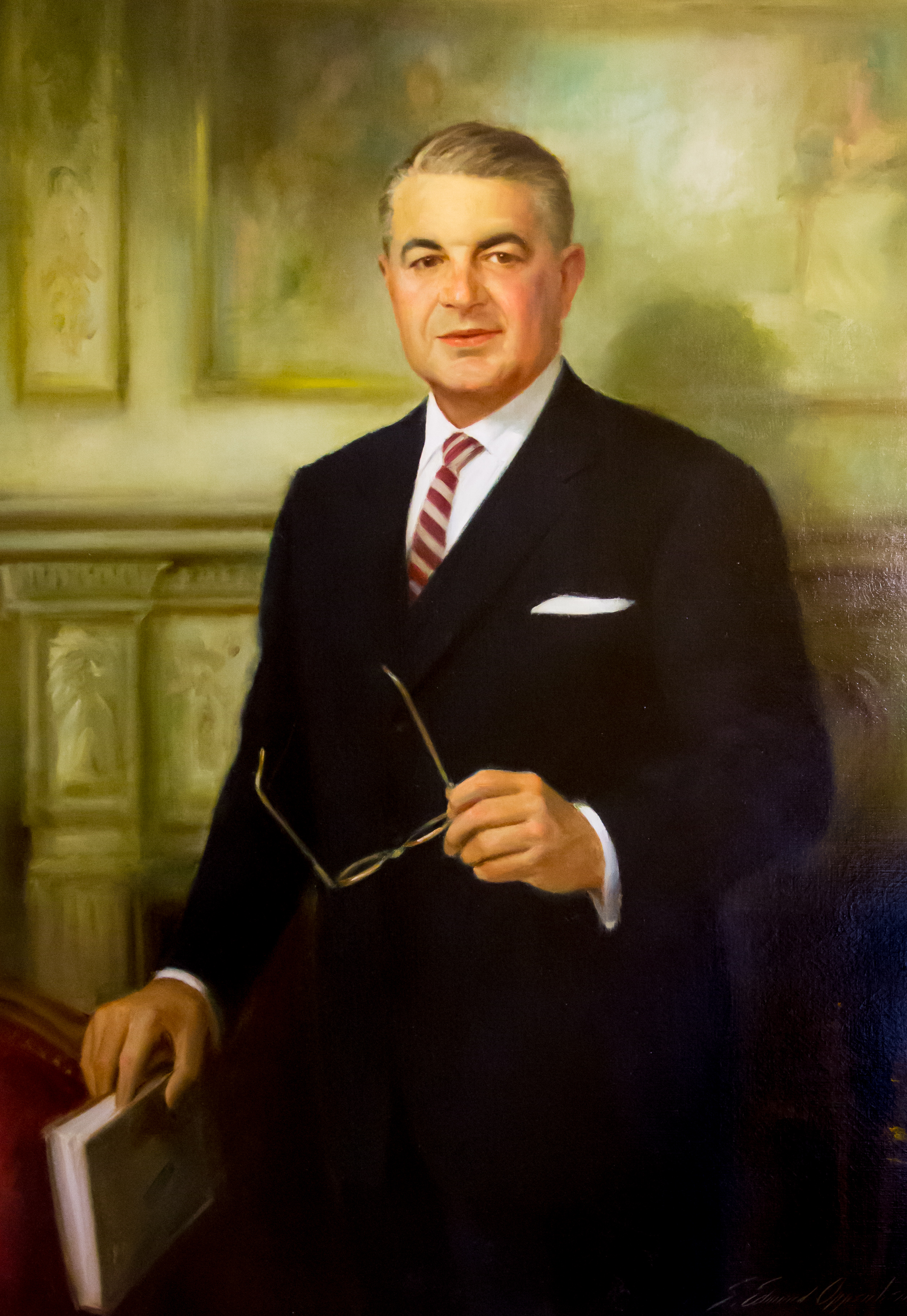

64th Governor of Rhode Island
- In office January 6, 1959 – January 3, 1961
- Lieutenant: John A. Notte, Jr.
- Preceded by: Dennis Roberts
- Succeeded by: John A. Notte Jr.

Personal details
- Born: March 10, 1907 Providence, Rhode Island, U.S.
- Died: December 27, 1973 (aged 66) Providence, Rhode Island, U.S.
- Party: Republican
- Spouse: Lola Elda Faraone (m. 1933)
- Children: 3
- Profession: Lawyer, Certified Public Accountant

Christopher Del Sesto (March 10, 1907 – December 23, 1973) was an American attorney, politician and a member of the Republican Party, who served as 64th governor of Rhode Island. When he became governor in 1959, Del Sesto was the first Republican chief executive to be chosen by Rhode Island voters in 20 years.

== Early life ==
Born in Providence, Rhode Island, Del Sesto graduated from Boston University and Georgetown University Law School, and later he did advanced studies in taxation at New York University and the University of Miami, becoming a certified public accountant and practicing attorney in Providence specializing in taxation and finance. He also worked as an academic teacher at both Boston University and Northeastern University in the late 1930s.

== Early political career ==
Del Sesto first held public office under the Democratic administration of Governor Theodore F. Green serving as a chief clerk in the office of the general treasurer from 1933 to 1935. In January, 1935, he was named assistant to Thomas P. McCoy of Pawtucket, state budget officer. But four months later, Governor Green ousted McCoy and Del Sesto became the budget officer. Later he went to become a special assistant to the U.S. Attorney handling cases associated with milk industry monopolies from 1938 to 1940, director of the Rhode Island Finance Department from 1940 to 1942, and a director of the state Office of Price Administration from 1942 to 1945.

== 1956 gubernatorial bid ==
Del Sesto was nominated by the Republicans as their candidate for governor for the first time in 1956. This was a highly disputed race. His Democratic opponent was incumbent governor Dennis Roberts.

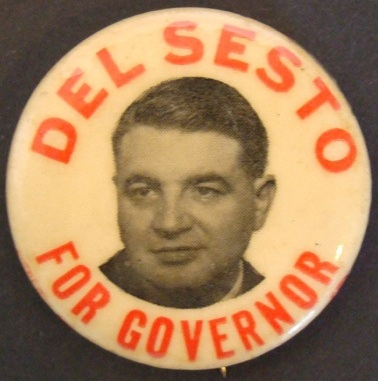
campaign button

Although Del Sesto won a plurality, he didn't become Governor that year. The Board of Elections completed its count on December 18, 1956; Del Sesto was the apparent winner by 427 votes. But in what was known as the "long count," the Rhode Island Supreme Court invalidated 5,000 civilian, absentee and shut-in ballots cast prior to election day on the grounds that a constitutional amendment required such votes to be cast on, rather than prior to, election day. The decision, released on New Year's Day, 1957, resulted in Roberts remaining in office by a plurality of 711 votes. The incumbent Governor's brother was on the Court and recused himself from the decision, but "two of the four judges hearing the case, Chief Justice Edmund W. Flynn and Justice Francis B. Condon, both Democrats, were elected to the Supreme Court" under dubious circumstances "during Rhode Island's infamous 'Bloodless Revolution of 1935'."

== Governorship 1959-1961 ==
Del Sesto ran again in 1958 and this time he defeated Roberts by 6,230 votes. He served as governor for one two-year term, from January 6, 1959, to January 3, 1961.

During his first year in office, Del Sesto set a record by vetoing ninety-eight pieces of legislation passed by a Democratic-controlled state legislature. Also during his administration, an accelerated program of highway construction was implemented, state aid for education to cities and towns was liberalized, and a state scholarship program was established.

He ran for re-election in 1960, but lost to Democratic lieutenant governor, John A. Notte, Jr. by 53,274 votes that year, Del Sesto had been a delegate to the Republican National Convention and made one of the speeches seconding the presidential nomination of Vice President Richard Nixon.

== Later life and death ==
After his defeat, Del Sesto was named in 1966 to the Rhode Island Superior Court by Governor John Chafee. He held this position until his death.

He was married to Lola Elda Faraone and had three children.

== Notes ==
Party political offices
Preceded by Dean J. Lewis	Republican nominee for Governor of Rhode Island; 1956, 1958, 1960	Succeeded by John Chafee
Political offices
Preceded by Dennis J. Roberts	Governor of Rhode Island; 1959–1961	Succeeded by John A. Notte, Jr.
