= 1954 Rhode Island gubernatorial election =

- November 2, 1954
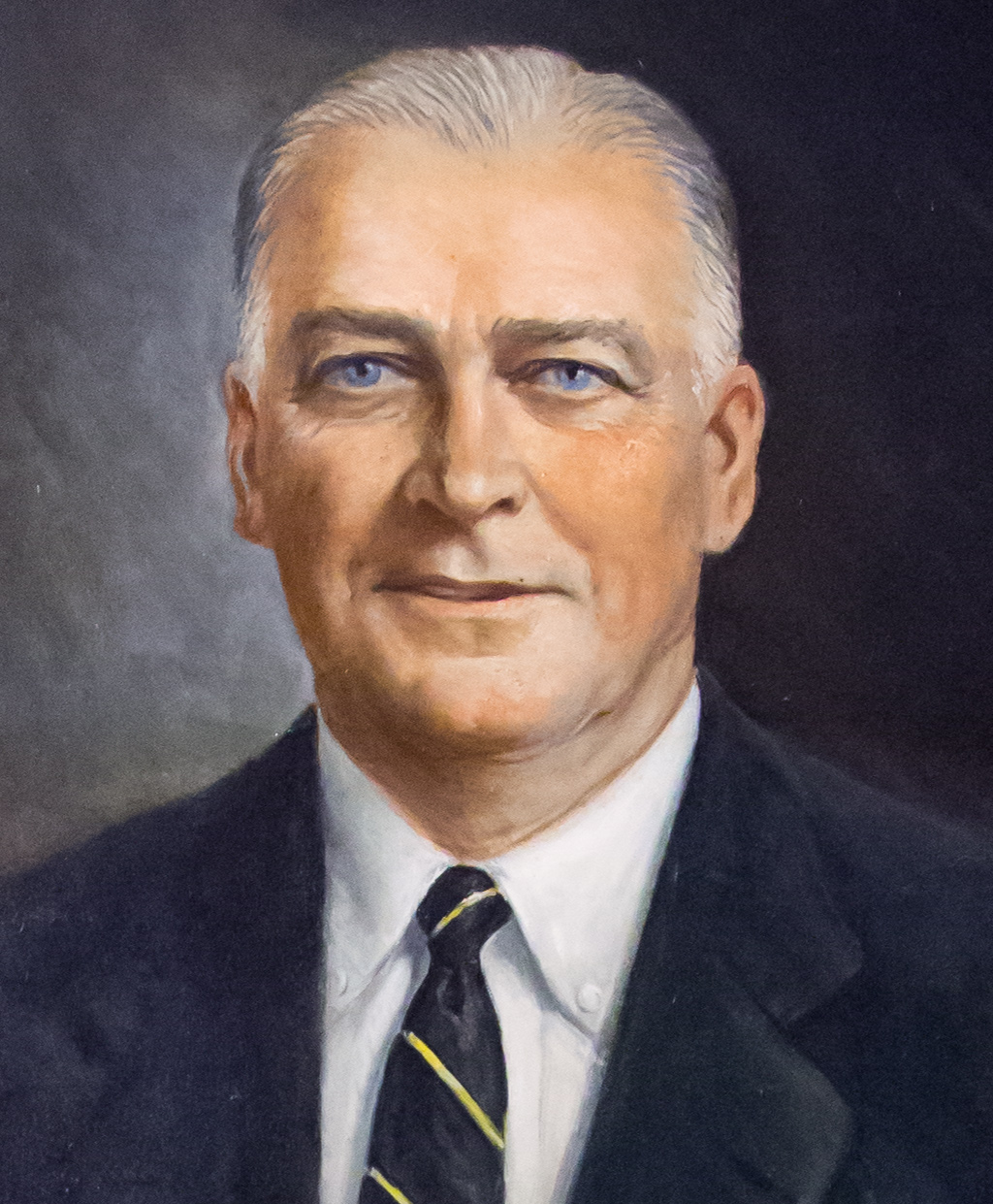

Nominee	Dennis J. Roberts	Dean J. Lewis
Party	Democratic	Republican
Popular vote	189,595	137,131
Percentage	57.69%	41.72%
- Roberts: 50–60% 60–70% Lewis: 50–60% 60–70%
Governor before election
Dennis J. Roberts
Democratic
Elected Governor
Dennis J. Roberts
Democratic

The 1954 Rhode Island gubernatorial election was held on November 2, 1954. Incumbent Democrat Dennis J. Roberts defeated Republican nominee Dean J. Lewis with 57.69% of the vote.

== General election ==
=== Candidates ===
- Dean J. Lewis (Republican)
- Arthur E. Marley, candidate for governor in 1952 (Independent)
- Dennis J. Roberts, incumbent Governor since 1951 (Democratic)

=== Results ===
1954 Rhode Island gubernatorial election
Party	Candidate	Votes	%	±%
Democratic	Dennis J. Roberts (incumbent)	189,595	57.69%	
Republican	Dean J. Lewis	137,131	41.72%	
Independent	Arthur E. Marley	1,944	0.59%	
Majority		52,464		
Turnout		328,670		
Democratic hold		Swing		
