= 1962 Rhode Island gubernatorial election =

- November 6, 1962
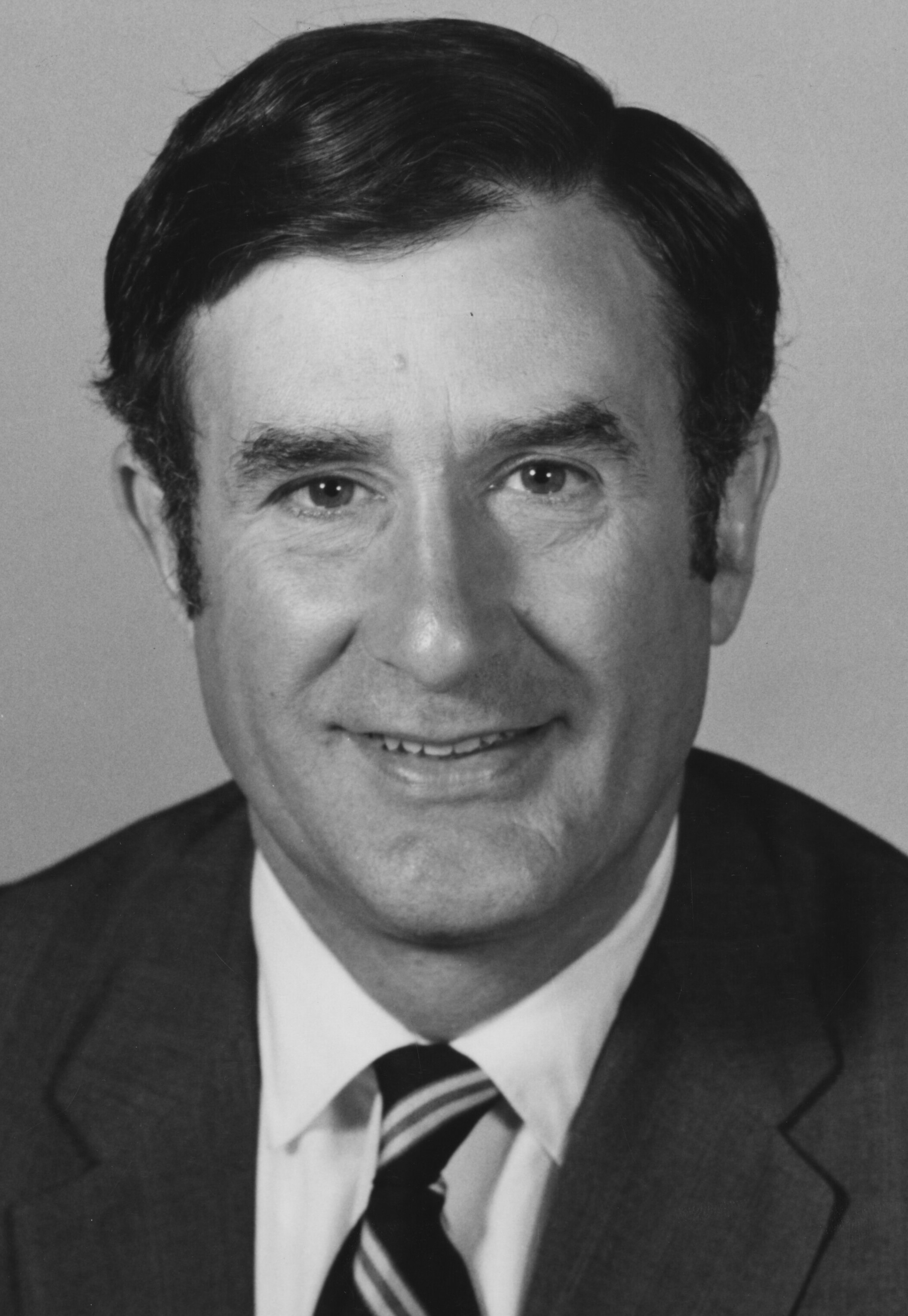

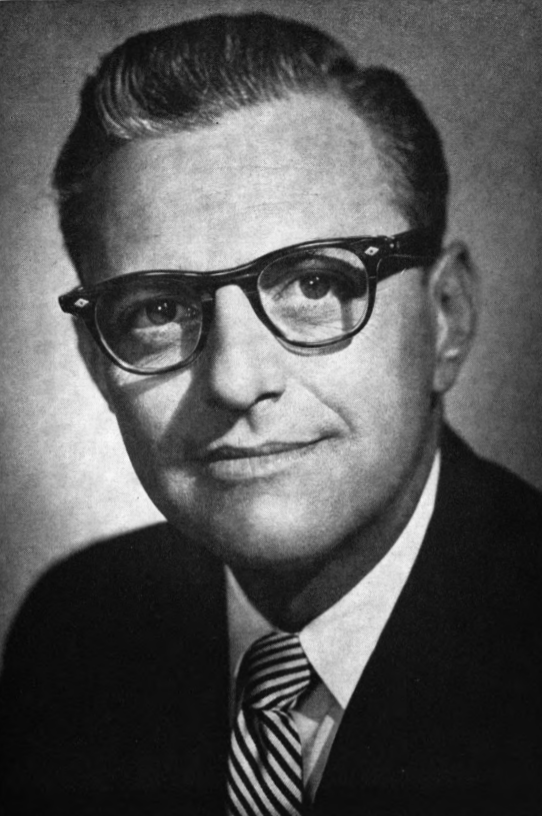
Nominee	John Chafee	John A. Notte Jr.
Party	Republican	Democratic
Popular vote	163,952	163,554
Percentage	50.06%	49.94%
- Chafee: 50–60% 60–70% 70–80% Notte: 50–60% 60–70%
Governor before election
John A. Notte Jr.
Democratic
Elected Governor
John Chafee
Republican

The 1962 Rhode Island gubernatorial election was held on November 6, 1962. Republican nominee John Chafee defeated Democratic incumbent John A. Notte Jr. with 50.06% of the vote, a margin of just 398 votes.

== Primary elections ==
Primary elections were held on September 11, 1962.

=== Democratic primary ===
==== Candidates ====
- John A. Notte Jr., incumbent governor
- Kevin K. Coleman, Mayor of Woonsocket
- Francis A. Manzi

==== Results ====
Democratic primary results
Party	Candidate	Votes	%
Democratic	John A. Notte Jr. (incumbent)	49,204	53.14
Democratic	Kevin K. Coleman	41,658	44.99
Democratic	Francis A. Manzi	1,733	1.87
Total votes		92,595	100.00

=== Republican primary ===
==== Candidates ====
- John Chafee, State Representative
- Louis V. Jackvony, former attorney general of Rhode Island
- Raymond W. Monaco

==== Results ====
Republican primary results
Party	Candidate	Votes	%
Republican	John Chafee	17,756	62.46
Republican	Louis V. Jackvony	10,459	36.79
Republican	Raymond W. Monaco	214	0.75
Total votes		28,429	100.00

== General election ==
=== Candidates ===
- John Chafee, Republican
- John A. Notte Jr., Democratic

=== Results ===
1962 Rhode Island gubernatorial election
Party	Candidate	Votes	%	±%
Republican	John Chafee	163,952	50.06%	
Democratic	John A. Notte Jr. (incumbent)	163,554	49.94%	
Majority		398		
Turnout		327,506		
Republican gain from Democratic		Swing		

==== By county ====
	John Chafee Republican		John Notte Democratic	
County	Votes	%	Votes	%
Bristol	9,345	58.8%	6,535	41.2%
Kent	27,614	58.7%	19,430	41.3%
Newport	11,736	51.9%	10,860	48.1%
Providence	103,007	46.5%	118,727	53.5%
Washington	12,250	60.5%	8,002	39.5%

Counties that flipped from Democratic to Republican

- Kent
- Bristol
- Newport
