= 1956 Rhode Island gubernatorial election =

- November 6, 1956
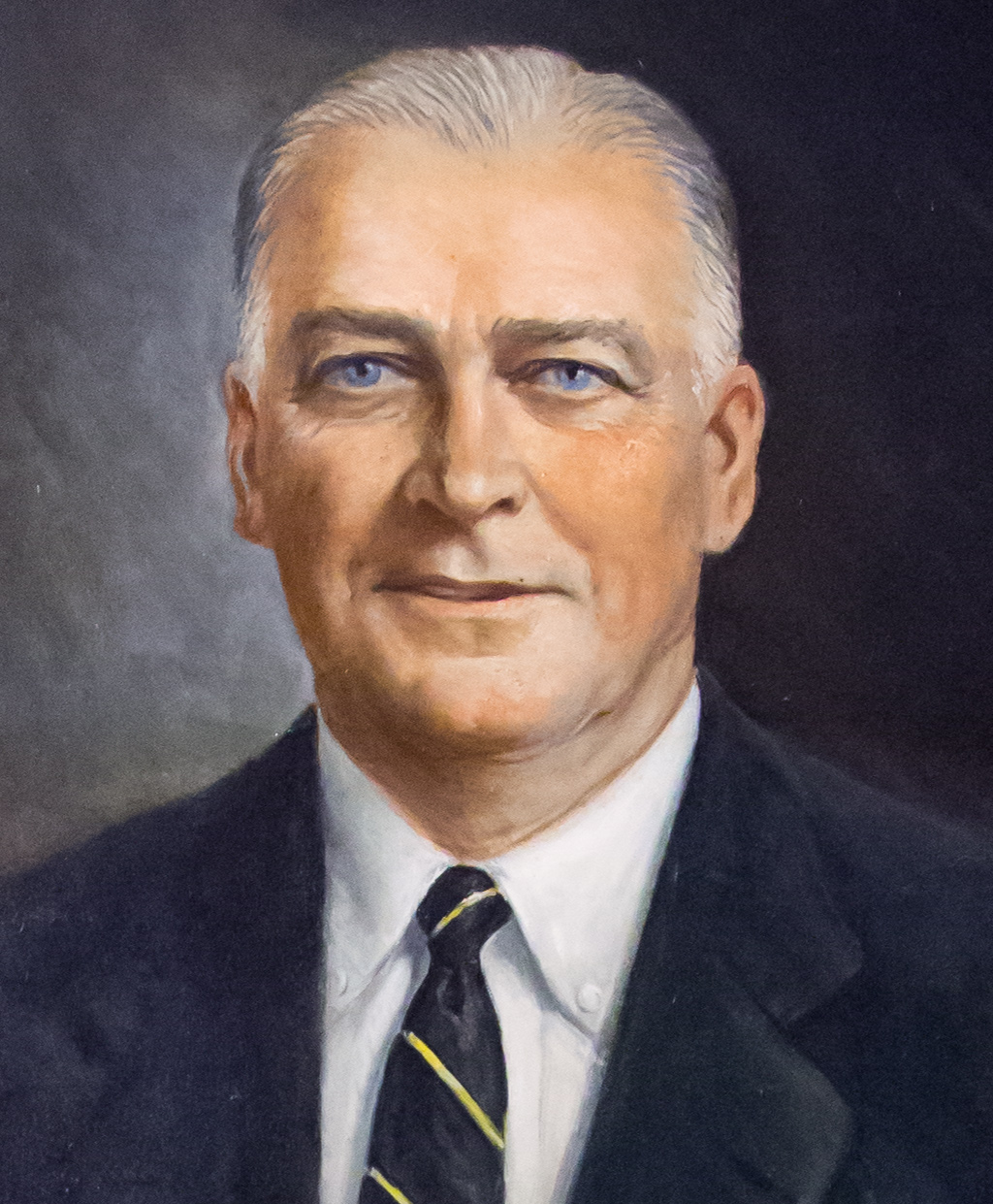

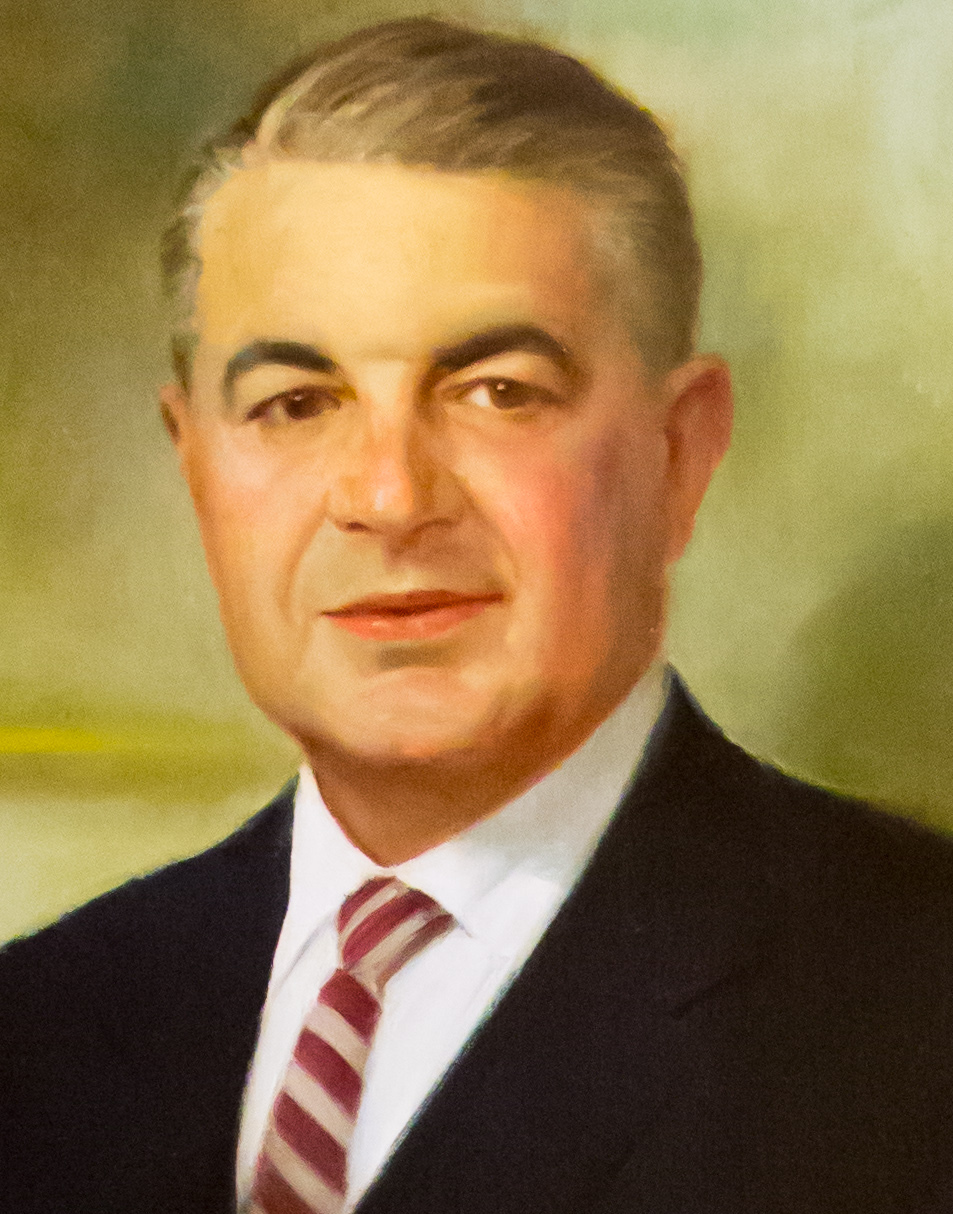
Nominee	Dennis J. Roberts	Christopher Del Sesto
Party	Democratic	Republican
Popular vote	192,315	191,604
Percentage	50.09%	49.91%
- Roberts: 50–60% 60–70% Del Sesto: 50–60% 60–70% 70–80%
Governor before election
Dennis J. Roberts
Democratic
Elected Governor
Dennis J. Roberts
Democratic

The 1956 Rhode Island gubernatorial election was held on November 6, 1956. Incumbent Democratic governor Dennis J. Roberts defeated Republican Christopher Del Sesto narrowly after five thousand ballots were invalidated by the Rhode Island Supreme Court.

== General election ==
=== Candidates ===
- Christopher Del Sesto, former director of the state Office of Price Administration (Republican)
- Dennis J. Roberts, incumbent Governor since 1951 (Democratic)

=== Results ===
Although Del Sesto won a plurality, he did not become Governor that year. The Board of Elections completed its count on December 18, 1956; Del Sesto was the apparent winner by 427 votes. But in what was known as the "long count," the Rhode Island Supreme Court invalidated 5,000 civilian, absentee and shut-in ballots cast prior to election day on the grounds that a constitutional amendment required such votes to be cast on, rather than prior to, election day. The decision, released on January 1, 1957, resulted in Roberts remaining in office by a plurality of 711 votes. The incumbent Governor's brother was on the Court and recused himself from the decision, but "two of the four judges hearing the case, Chief Justice Edmund W. Flynn and Justice Francis B. Condon, both Democrats, were elected to the Supreme Court" under dubious circumstances "during Rhode Island's infamous 'Bloodless Revolution of 1935'."

1956 Rhode Island gubernatorial election
Party	Candidate	Votes	%	±%
Democratic	Dennis J. Roberts (incumbent)	192,315	50.09%	
Republican	Christopher Del Sesto	191,604	49.91%	
Majority		711		
Turnout		383,919		
Democratic hold		Swing		

== Aftermath ==
Del Sesto ran again in 1958 and this time he defeated Roberts by 6,237 votes.
