= Dennis J. Roberts =

Governor of Rhode Island, US

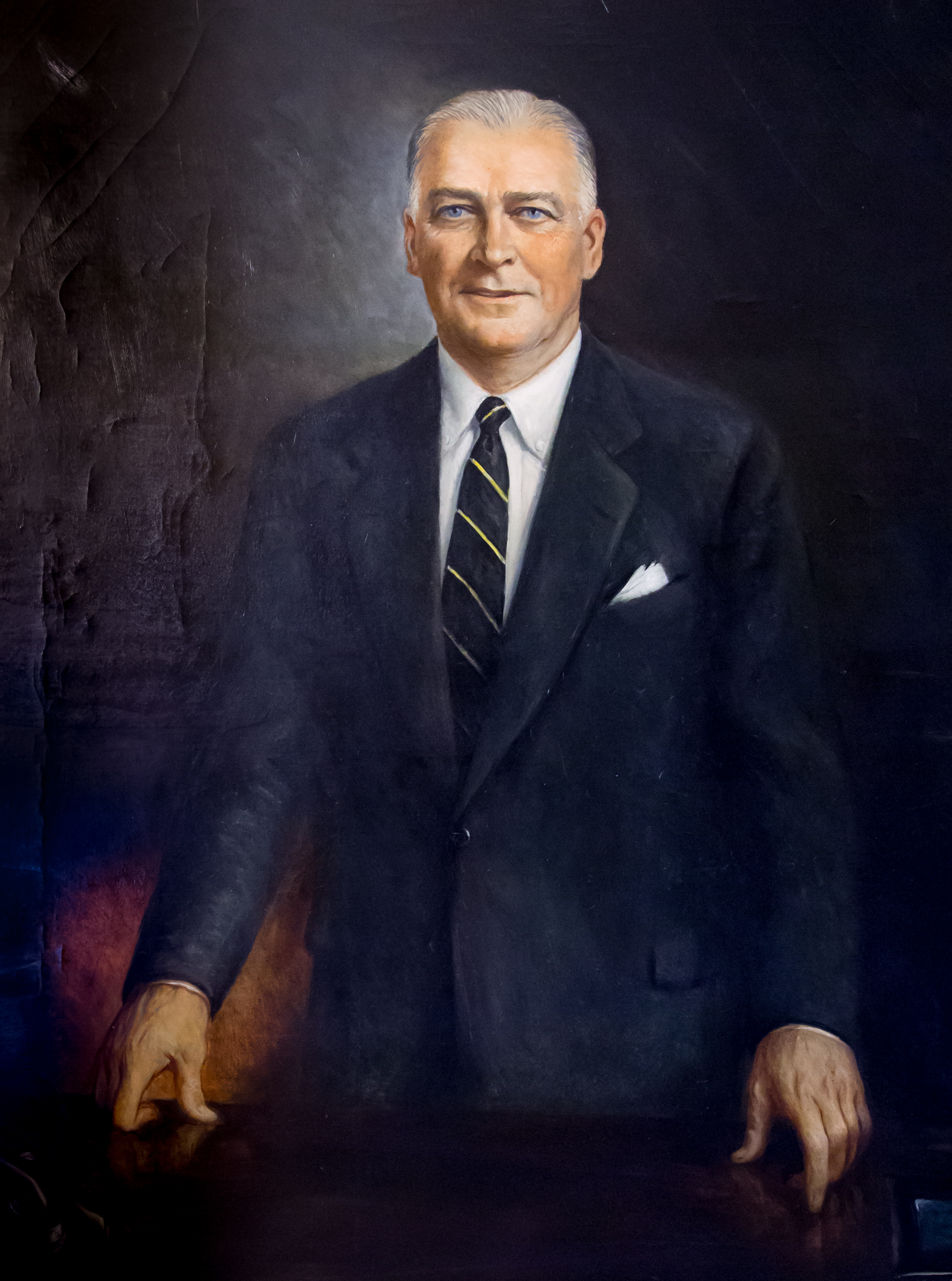

63rd Governor of Rhode Island
- In office January 2, 1951 – January 6, 1959
- Lieutenant: John S. McKiernan; Armand H. Cote
- Preceded by: John S. McKiernan
- Succeeded by: Christopher Del Sesto

29th Mayor of Providence
- In office January 1941 – January 1951
- Preceded by: John F. Collins
- Succeeded by: Walter H. Reynolds

Member of the Rhode Island Senate
- In office 1935–1939

Personal details
- Born: Dennis Joseph Roberts; April 8, 1903 Providence, Rhode Island, U.S.
- Died: June 30, 1994 (aged 91) Providence, Rhode Island, U.S.
- Party: Democratic
- Relatives: Thomas H. Roberts (brother); Dennis J. Roberts II (nephew)
- Profession: Lawyer

Military service
- Allegiance: United States
- Branch/service: United States Navy
- Years of service: 1941 – 1945
- Rank: Lieutenant commander
- Battles/wars: World War II

Dennis Joseph Roberts (April 8, 1903 – June 30, 1994) was an American politician and member of the Democratic Party who served as the 63rd governor of Rhode Island.

== Biography ==
Born in Rhode Island's capital city, Providence, Roberts graduated La Salle Academy in 1923. He was a graduate of Fordham University in 1927 and Boston University Law School in 1930, following which he practiced law in Providence.

His political career began in 1935 when he was elected to the State Senate, where he served until 1939. He became chairman of the State Democratic Party in 1938. He was a delegate to the 1936, 1940, 1948 and 1960 Democratic National Conventions (first time as an alternate delegate).

Roberts was elected Mayor of Providence in 1940, and served until 1951, except when he served in the United States Navy during World War II. He rose to rank of lieutenant commander. He is mentioned by title in Arthur Miller's 1949 play Death of a Salesman, as the Mayor of Providence.

== Governor ==
He was elected Governor of Rhode Island in 1950 and was re-elected three times, serving four two-year terms, holding the office from January 2, 1951 to January 6, 1959. While governor, he established a Department of Administration as a housekeeping agency for finance and other problems, as well as a Development Council to promote economic development in Rhode Island. He also reorganized the Department of Social Welfare to improve its administration. During the 1956 Gubernatorial election he lost in plurality votes to Republican Christopher Del Sesto, but the Rhode Island Supreme Court invalidated 5,000 civilian absentee and shut-in ballots cast prior to election day on the ground that a constitutional amendment required such votes to be cast on, rather than prior to, election day. This left Roberts the winner. He was defeated by Del Sesto two years later.

In 1960, former Governor Roberts sought the Democratic nomination for a U.S. Senate seat but was defeated by Claiborne Pell, who won and served in the Senate until 1997. He later went on to chair the Rhode Island Constitutional Convention, where he recommended a unicameral state legislature.

Roberts died while in surgery for a ruptured aneurysm in Rhode Island Hospital in Providence. He was a Catholic.

Party political offices
| Preceded by John Pastore | Democratic nominee for Governor of Rhode Island; 1950, 1952, 1954, 1956, 1958 | Succeeded by John A. Notte Jr. |
Political offices
| Preceded by John F. Collins | Mayor of Providence; 1941–1951 | Succeeded by Walter H. Reynolds |
| Preceded by John S. McKiernan | Governor of Rhode Island; 1951–1959 | Succeeded by Christopher Del Sesto |
