= 1978 Rhode Island gubernatorial election =

- November 7, 1978
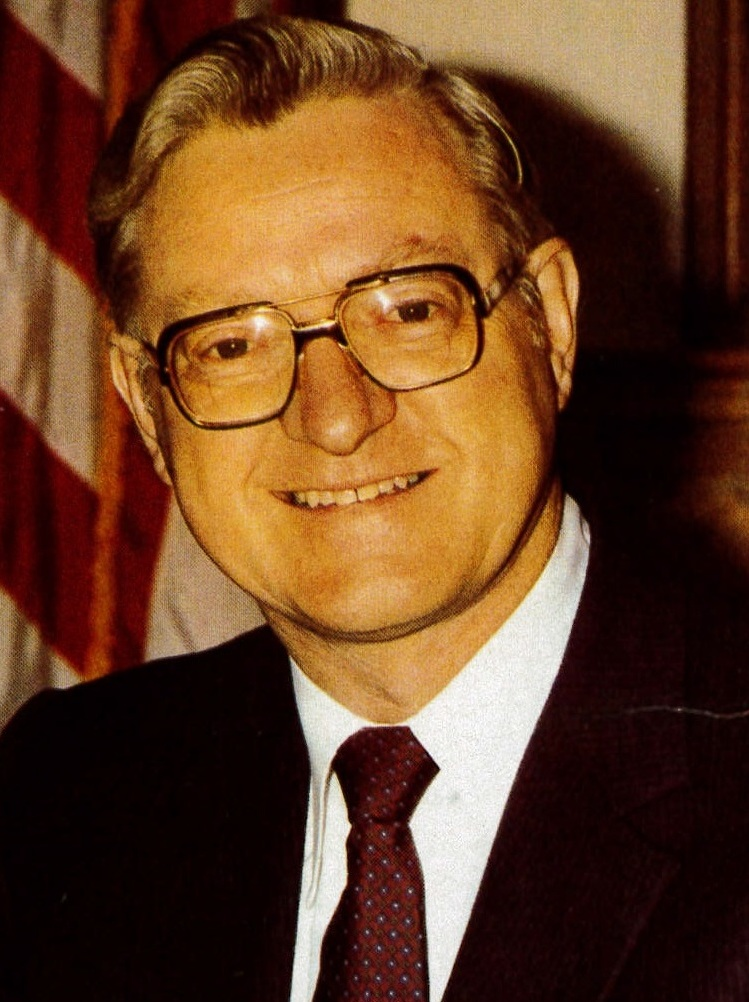

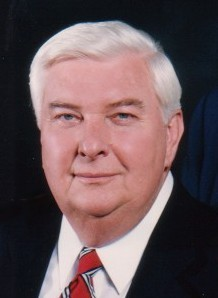

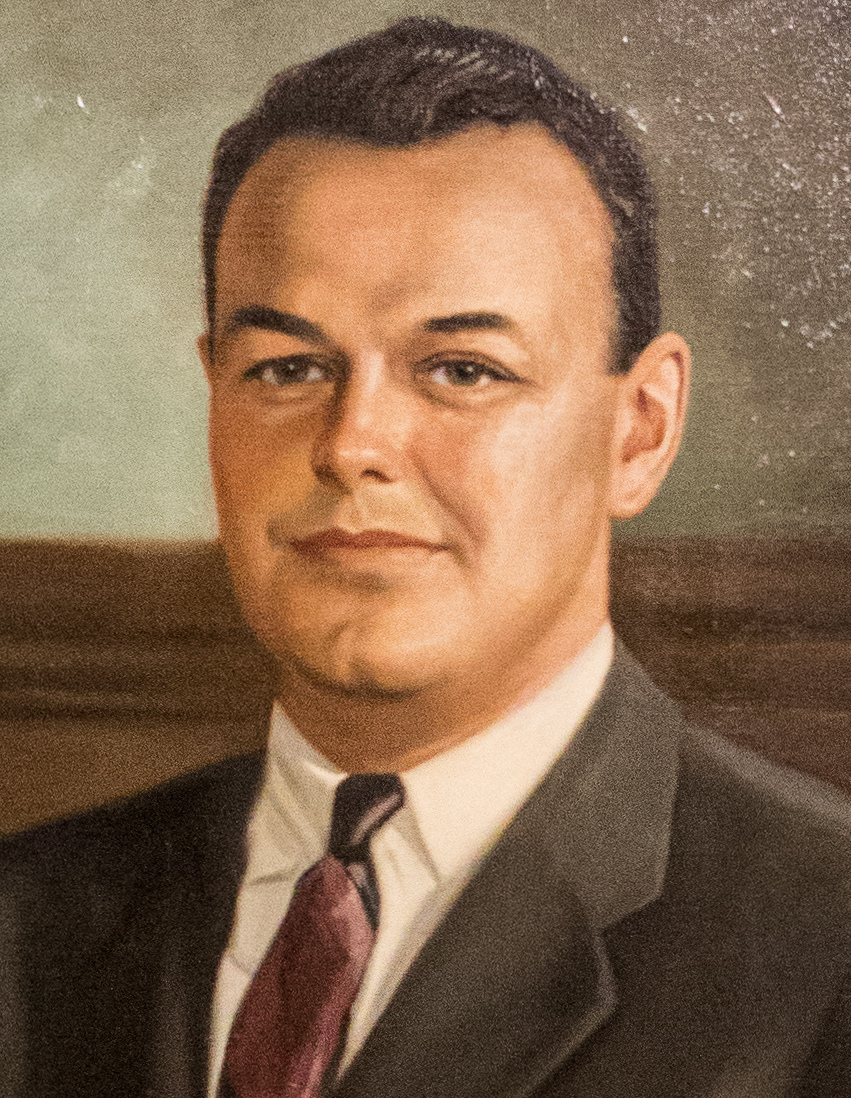
Nominee	J. Joseph Garrahy	Lincoln Almond	Joseph A. Doorley Jr.
Party	Democratic	Republican	Independent
Popular vote	197,386	96,596	20,381
Percentage	62.79%	30.73%	6.48%
- Garrahy: 40–50% 50–60% 60–70% 70–80% Almond: 50–60%
Governor before election
J. Joseph Garrahy
Democratic
Elected Governor
J. Joseph Garrahy
Democratic

The 1978 Rhode Island gubernatorial election was held on November 7, 1978. Incumbent Democrat J. Joseph Garrahy defeated Republican nominee and future governor Lincoln Almond with 62.79% of the vote.

== General election ==
=== Candidates ===
- Lincoln Almond, U.S Attorney for the District of Rhode Island (Republican)
- Joseph A. Doorley Jr., former mayor of Providence (Independent)
- J. Joseph Garrahy, incumbent governor (Democratic)

=== Results ===
1978 Rhode Island gubernatorial election
Party	Candidate	Votes	%	±%
Democratic	J. Joseph Garrahy (incumbent)	197,386	62.79%	
Republican	Lincoln Almond	96,596	30.73%	
Independent	Joseph A. Doorley Jr.	20,381	6.48%	
Majority		100,790		
Turnout		314,363		
Democratic hold		Swing		

==== By county ====
	Joseph Garrahy Democratic		Lincoln Almond Republican		Joseph Dooley Independent	
County	Votes	%	Votes	%	Votes	%
Bristol	95,13	60.2%	5,657	35.8%	643	4.1%
Kent	32,710	61.5%	16,999	32.0%	3,442	6.5%
Newport	15,140	64.4%	6,996	29.7%	1,385	5.9%
Providence	124,394	64.1%	56,798	29.3%	12,922	6.7%
Washington	15,629	56.3%	10,146	36.5%	1,989	7.2%

Counties that flipped from Republican to Democratic

- Kent
- Washington
