= 1952 Rhode Island gubernatorial election =

- November 4, 1952
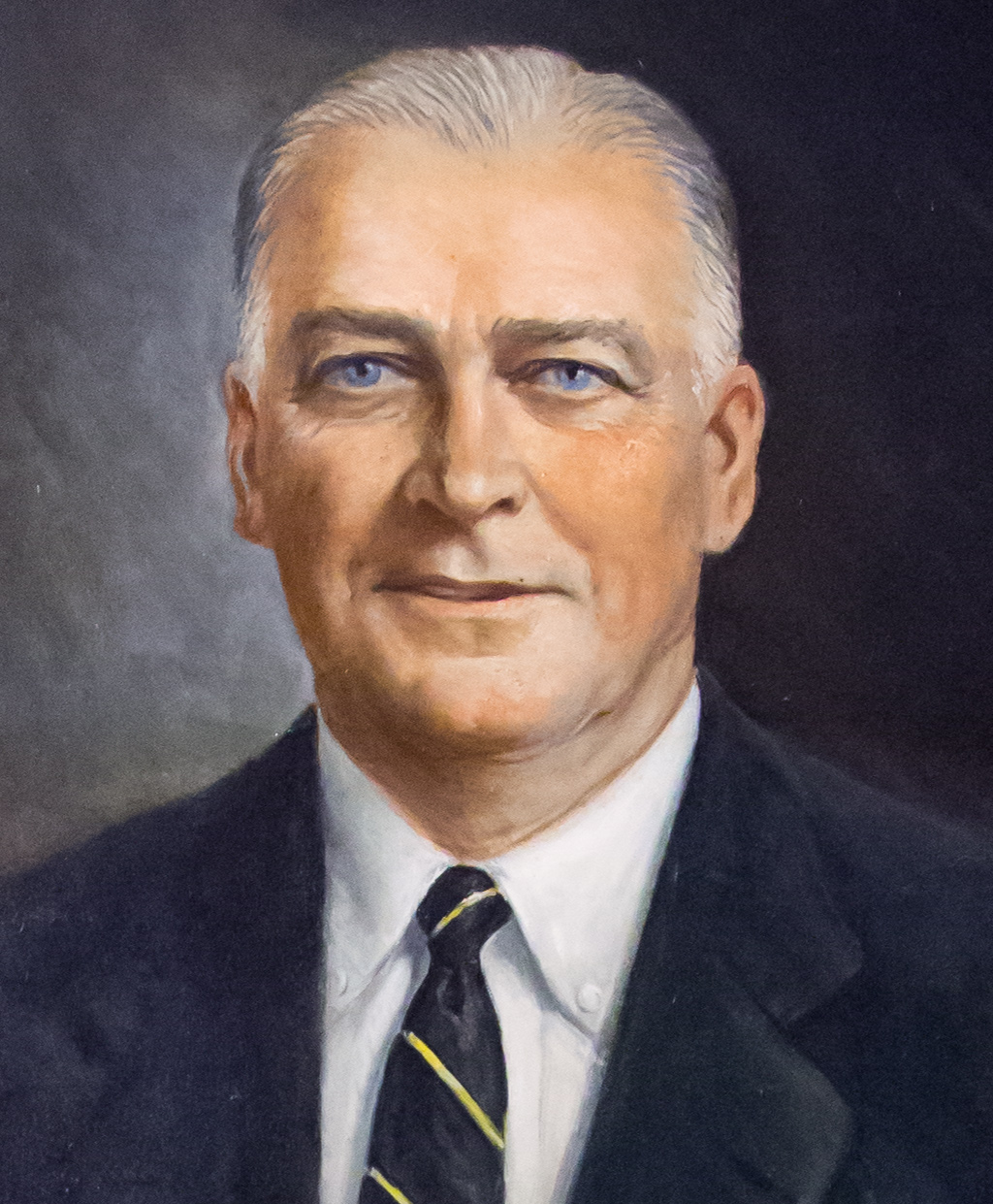

Nominee	Dennis J. Roberts	Raoul Archambault Jr.
Party	Democratic	Republican
Popular vote	215,587	194,102
Percentage	52.62%	47.38%
- Roberts: 50–60% 60–70% Archambault: 50–60% 60–70% 70–80%
Governor before election
Dennis J. Roberts
Democratic
Elected Governor
Dennis J. Roberts
Democratic

The 1952 Rhode Island gubernatorial election was held on November 4, 1952. Incumbent Democrat Dennis J. Roberts defeated Republican nominee Raoul Archambault Jr. with 52.62% of the vote.

Primary elections were held on September 24, 1952.

== Democratic primary ==
=== Candidates ===
- Dennis J. Roberts, incumbent Governor since 1951
- Arthur E. Marley

==== Results ====
Democratic primary results
Party	Candidate	Votes	%
Democratic	Dennis J. Roberts (incumbent)	35,490	91.06
Democratic	Arthur E. Marley	3,483	8.94
Total votes		38,973	100.00

== General election ==
=== Candidates ===
- Raoul Archambault Jr. (Republican)
- Dennis J. Roberts, incumbent Governor since 1951 (Democratic)

=== Results ===
1952 Rhode Island gubernatorial election
Party	Candidate	Votes	%	±%
Democratic	Dennis J. Roberts (incumbent)	215,587	52.62%	
Republican	Raoul Archambault Jr.	194,102	47.38%	
Majority		21,485		
Turnout		409,689		
Democratic hold		Swing		
