= Leonard Holland =

American military officer (1916–1999)

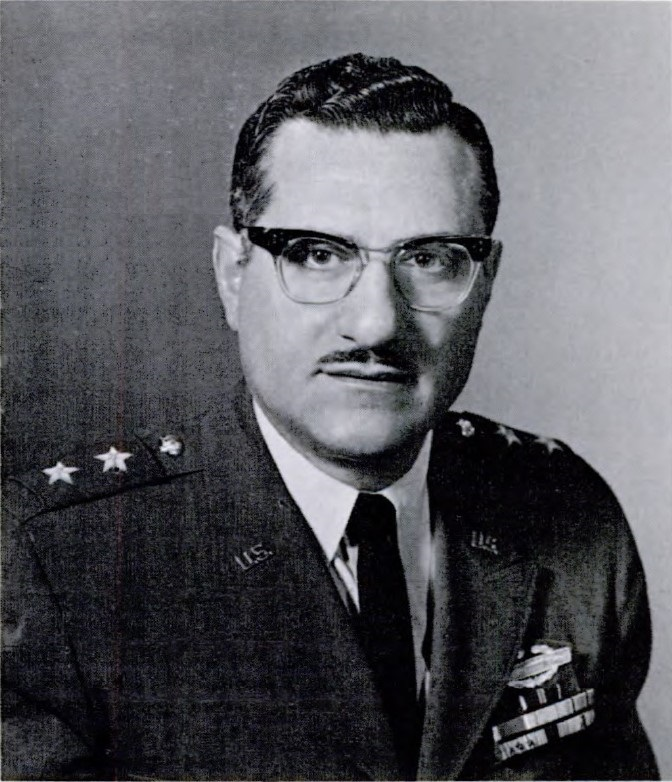
Maj. Gen. Leonard Holland circa 1966

Major General Leonard Holland (April 9, 1916 – August 16, 1999) was an American military officer from Rhode Island. He served as the Adjutant General of Rhode Island for 22 years from 1961 to 1983, longer than anyone else.

== Biography ==
Leonard Holland was born in Providence, Rhode Island on April 9, 1916.

=== World War II ===
He enlisted in the United States Army on April 16, 1941, eight months before the Japanese attack on Pearl Harbor. During World War II he served in the Pacific Theater with the 43rd Infantry Division in the Solomon Islands and New Guinea and received the Combat Infantryman Badge, Bronze Star Medal and the Purple Heart.

He was commissioned a second lieutenant in the Infantry branch on August 6, 1942. He rose through the ranks and was promoted to major on February 12, 1946, shortly before being discharged from active duty.

After the war, Holland became an officer in the Officers Reserve Corps (i.e., Army Reserve). As a lieutenant colonel, he served as commander of the 1st Battalion, 385th Infantry Regiment. Holland received a state promotion to colonel in January 1959. He also graduated from the United States Army Command and General Staff College and the Infantry Officers Advanced Course in 1959.

=== Adjutant General of Rhode Island ===
Late in 1960 he was selected by Rhode Island Governor elect John A. Notte to become Adjutant General of Rhode Island in command of the Rhode Island National Guard. Holland received federal recognition as a colonel on January 2, 1961, and then as a major general on March 16, 1961, shortly before his forty-fifth birthday. Although Notte was defeated for re-election, Holland went on to serve under four more governors before he retired.

During Holland's tenure as Adjutant General, two units of the Rhode Island National Guard were called to federal active duty. They were the 115th Military Police Company which was assigned to the United States Military Academy at West Point, New York and the 107th Signal Company which was deployed to Vietnam from 1967 to 1968. The 107th was one of only eight National Guard units to be deployed to Vietnam. General Holland went to Vietnam to visit the soldiers of the 107th, making him one of the few Adjutants General of Rhode Island to visit an active combat theater.

In February 1978 Rhode Island was buried in over three feet of snow in the Blizzard of 1978. This led to the Rhode Island National Guard being mobilized to deal with emergency situations and return the state to a more normal condition. General Holland oversaw the operations of over 3,000 Guardsmen which rendered invaluable assistance in the weeks following the blizzard.

In 1981 General Holland was inducted into the Rhode Island Heritage Hall of Fame.

In 2018 General Holland was inducted into the Pawtucket Hall of Fame.

=== Retirement ===
General Holland retired from the Army in August 1983 and was awarded the Distinguished Service Medal and the rarely awarded Rhode Island Cross, Rhode Island's highest military decoration. He was succeeded by Major General John W. Kiely, a veteran of World War II, Korea and Vietnam.

After retirement, Holland split his time between homes in Pawtucket, Rhode Island and West Beach, Florida. In 1996, he became disabled after falling and fracturing his skull.

He died on August 16, 1999 at a nursing facility in Atlanta, Georgia near the homes of two of his sons, after suffering a stroke. He is buried in Lincoln Park Cemetery in Warwick, Rhode Island.

== Legacy ==
After General Holland's retirement, the Rhode Island General Assembly passed a law that Adjutants General of Rhode Island would be limited to two five-year terms in office.

== Awards ==
- Combat Infantryman Badge
- Distinguished Service Medal
- Legion of Merit
- Bronze Star Medal
- Army Commendation Medal
- Purple Heart
- Army Reserve Components Achievement Medal with oak leaf cluster
- American Defense Service Medal
- American Campaign Medal
- Asiatic-Pacific Campaign Medal with campaign star
- Army of Occupation Medal
- National Defense Service Medal with star
- Humanitarian Service Medal
- Armed Forces Reserve Medal with three hourglass devices
- Rhode Island Cross
- Rhode Island National Guard Service Medal
- Rhode Island Emergency Service Ribbon with Pendant
