= 1950 Rhode Island gubernatorial election =

- November 7, 1950
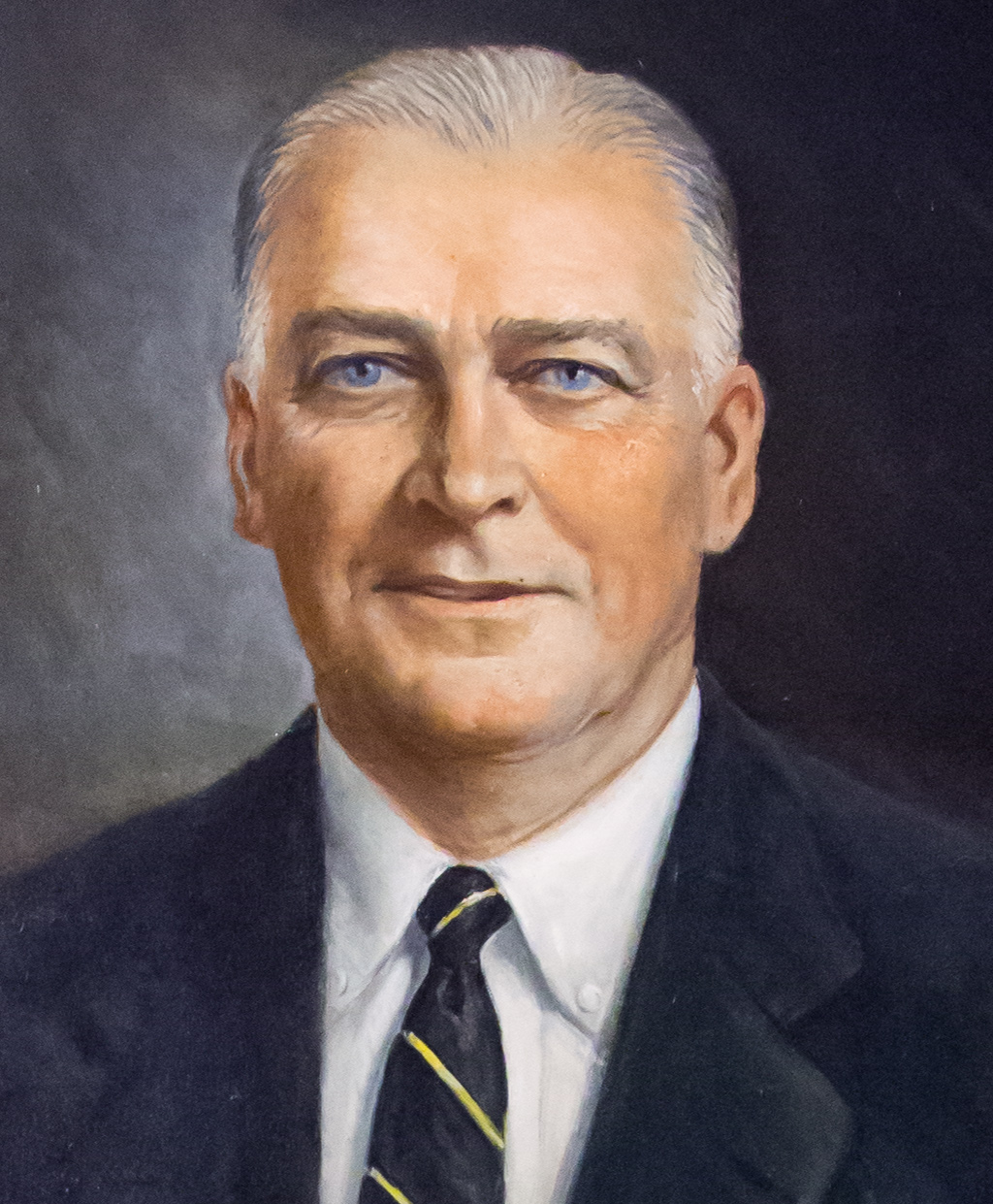

Nominee	Dennis J. Roberts	Eugene J. Lachapelle
Party	Democratic	Republican
Popular vote	176,125	120,683
Percentage	59.34%	40.66%
- Roberts: 50–60% 60–70% Lachapelle: 50–60% 60–70% 70–80%
Governor before election
John Pastore
Democratic
Elected Governor
Dennis J. Roberts
Democratic

The 1950 Rhode Island gubernatorial election was held on November 7, 1950. Democratic nominee Dennis J. Roberts defeated Republican nominee Eugene J. Lachapelle with 59.34% of the vote.

== General election ==
=== Candidates ===
- Dennis J. Roberts, mayor of Providence (Democratic)
- Eugene J. Lachapelle (Republican)

=== Results ===
1950 Rhode Island gubernatorial election
Party	Candidate	Votes	%	±%
Democratic	Dennis J. Roberts	176,125	59.34%	
Republican	Eugene J. Lachapelle	120,683	40.66%	
Majority		55,442		
Turnout		296,808		
Democratic hold		Swing		
