= John A. Notte Jr. =

American politician

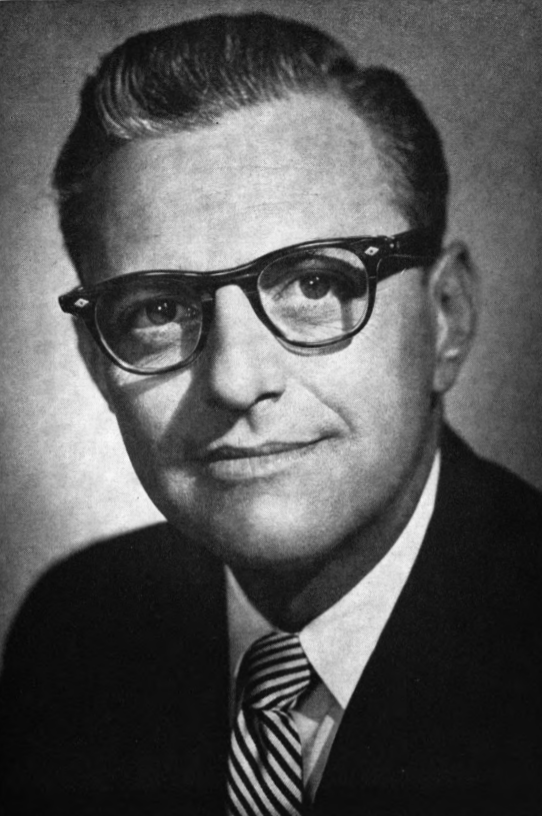
- Official portrait, 1961

65th Governor of Rhode Island
- In office January 3, 1961 – January 1, 1963
- Lieutenant: Edward P. Gallogly
- Preceded by: Christopher Del Sesto
- Succeeded by: John Chafee

57th Lieutenant Governor of Rhode Island
- In office January 6, 1959 – January 3, 1961
- Governor: Christopher Del Sesto
- Preceded by: Armand H. Cote
- Succeeded by: Edward P. Gallogly

Secretary of State of Rhode Island
- In office 1957–1959
- Governor: Dennis J. Roberts
- Preceded by: Armand H. Cote
- Succeeded by: August P. LaFrance

Personal details
- Born: May 3, 1909 Providence, Rhode Island, U.S.
- Died: March 7, 1983 (aged 73) Smithfield, Rhode Island, U.S.
- Party: Democratic
- Spouse: Marie J. Huerth (m. 1936; died 1980)
- Education: Providence College; Boston University
- Profession: Lawyer

John Anthony Notte Jr. (May 3, 1909 – March 7, 1983) was an American lawyer and politician who was the 65th governor of Rhode Island from 1961 to 1963. A member of the Democratic Party, he was the 57th lieutenant governor from 1959 to 1961.

== Biography ==
A son of John Anthony Notte and Eva Theresa (Rondina) Notte, he was born in Providence, Rhode Island. He was married to Marie J. Huerth in 1934. The couple had two children together.

Notte graduated from the Boston University Law School in 1935. He went on to practice law and served as town solicitor in North Providence in 1937. During his undergraduate years, Notte joined Alpha Phi Delta.

During World War II he served in the United States Navy and rose to the rank of lieutenant. Just after return to home he was elected Chairman of the Rhode Island Veterans' Bonus Board. From 1949 to 1950 he served as State Commander of the Rhode Island Department of the Veterans of Foreign Wars.

He later served as a member of staff of Senator Theodore F. Green from 1948 to 1956, and as Chairman of the North Providence Democratic town committee.

Notte resigned from Green's staff after he was elected Secretary of State, a post he held from 1957 to 1958. He was a delegate to the 1960 Democratic National Convention and became the 57th Lieutenant Governor of Rhode Island in 1959 and served until 1961 under Republican Christopher Del Sesto (Rhode Island Governor and his deputy are elected at the separate ballots).

== Governorship ==
Notte was elected Governor in 1960, defeating Del Sesto, and held this post from January 3, 1961 to January 1, 1963 – one single two-year term.

Under his administration, a family court was established and Rhode Island held its first one-day, one-place Democratic and Republican primaries.

He appointed Leonard Holland as state Adjutant General early in his term. Holland would lead the Rhode Island National Guard for the next 22 years.

He was defeated for re-election by Republican John Chafee in the state's tightest gubernatorial race ever – a margin of 398 votes. His defeat coincided with a lack of support from labor unions (he was the first Democratic Governor running without labor support), because of a withdrawal of support for a state income tax.

== Later life ==
After he left office, he returned to his law practice and sought the Democratic nomination in the special election to the United States House of Representatives in 1967 but lost the primary.

Notte died on March 7, 1983, at the age of 73 and was buried in St. Francis Cemetery in Pawtucket, Rhode Island.

== Legacy ==
Governor Notte Park in North Providence is named after him.

Party political offices
Preceded by Armand H. Cote	Democratic nominee for Secretary of State of Rhode Island; 1956	Succeeded by August P. LaFrance
Preceded by Armand H. Cote	Democratic nominee for Lieutenant Governor of Rhode Island; 1958	Succeeded by Edward P. Gallogly
Preceded by Dennis J. Roberts	Democratic nominee for Governor of Rhode Island; 1960, 1962	Succeeded by Edward P. Gallogly
Political offices
Preceded by Armand H. Cote	Secretary of State of Rhode Island; 1957–1959	Succeeded by August P. LaFrance
Preceded by Armand H. Cote	Lieutenant Governor of Rhode Island; 1959–1961	Succeeded by Edward P. Gallogly
Preceded by Christopher Del Sesto	Governor of Rhode Island; 1961–1963	Succeeded by John Chafee
