= Armand H. Cote =

American politician

Armand Horace Cote (April 19, 1909– April 28, 1980) was a politician from Rhode Island. He served as the state's secretary of state and as its lieutenant governor.

== Biography ==
Cote was born in Central Falls, Rhode Island on April 19, 1909. He was a lifelong Democrat.

In 1940 he was elected as Secretary of State of Rhode Island, and served eight two year terms from January 1941 to January 1957.

He was a delegate to the Democratic National Convention from Rhode Island in 1948, 1952 (alternate) and in 1960.

In 1956 he was elected Lieutenant Governor of Rhode Island and served under Governor Dennis J. Roberts from January 1957 to January 1959.

He was a candidate for the Democratic nomination for governor of Rhode Island in 1958 and 1960 but was defeated in the primary election both times.

He was of French Canadian ancestry and was a Roman Catholic. He was married to Estelle Pauline Beauregard (1906-2000).

Lieutenant Governor Cote died in April 1980.

Party political offices
Preceded by Louis W. Cappelli	Democratic nominee for Secretary of State of Rhode Island; 1940, 1942, 1944, 1946, 1948, 1950, 1952, 1954	Succeeded by John A. Notte Jr.
Preceded by John S. McKiernan	Democratic nominee for Lieutenant Governor of Rhode Island; 1956	Succeeded by John A. Notte Jr.
Political offices
Preceded by J. Hector Paquin	Secretary of State of Rhode Island; 1941–1957	Succeeded by John A. Notte, Jr.
Preceded by John S. McKiernan	Lieutenant Governor of Rhode Island; 1957–1959	Succeeded by John A. Notte, Jr.
