= Robert D. Fulton =

American politician (1929–2024)

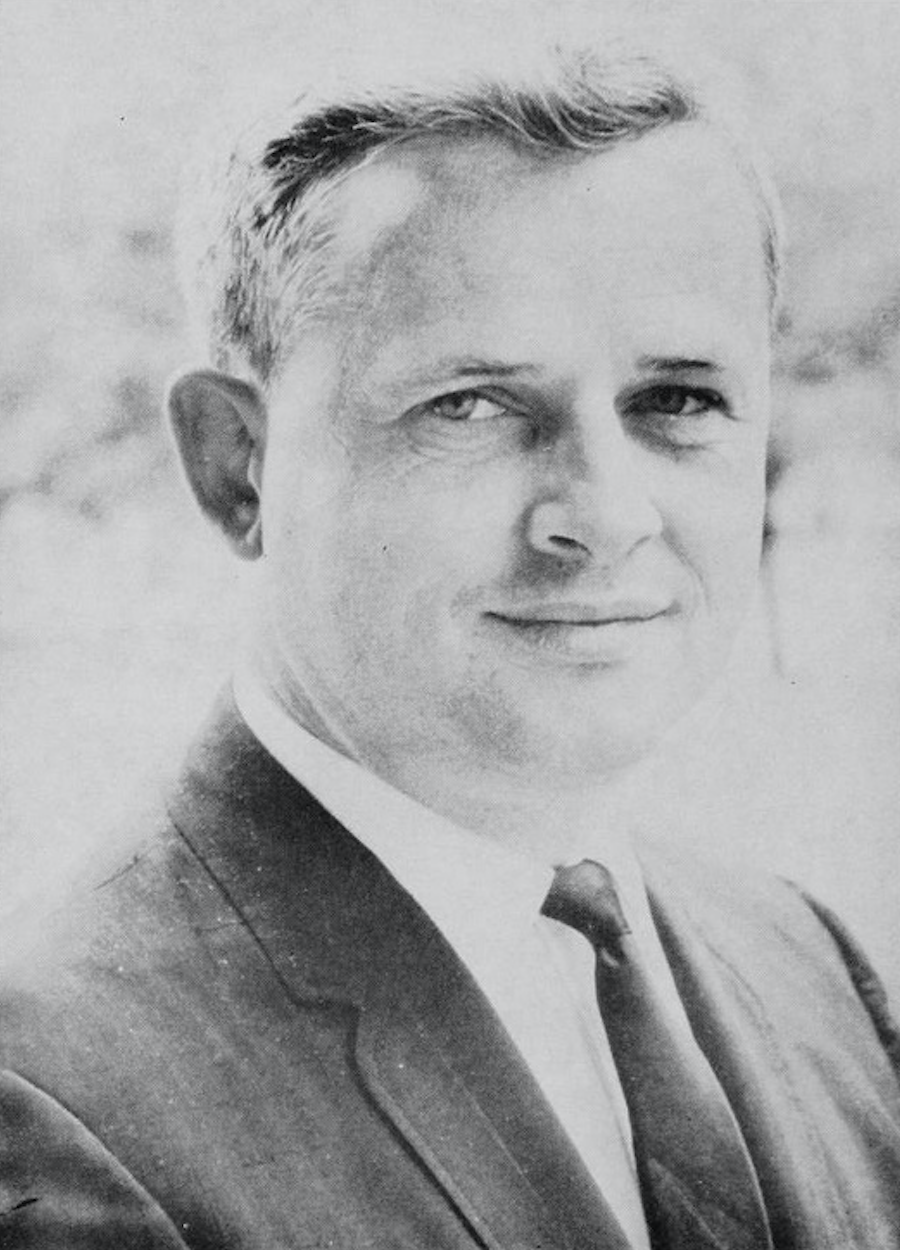
- Fulton in 1967

37th Governor of Iowa
- In office January 1, 1969 – January 16, 1969
- Preceded by: Harold Hughes
- Succeeded by: Robert Ray

37th Lieutenant Governor of Iowa
- In office January 17, 1965 – January 1, 1969
- Governor: Harold Hughes
- Preceded by: W. L. Mooty
- Succeeded by: Roger Jepsen

Member of the Iowa Senate
- In office January 14, 1963 – January 10, 1965
- Constituency: 34th District

Member of the Iowa House of Representatives
- In office January 12, 1959 – January 8, 1961
- Constituency: 66th District

Personal details
- Born: May 13, 1929 Waterloo, Iowa, U.S.
- Died: February 21, 2024 (aged 94) Minneapolis, Minnesota, U.S.
- Party: Democratic
- Spouse: Rachel Breault (m. 1955; died 2015)
- Children: 4
- Education: Waterloo East High School; Iowa State Teachers College (BS); University of Iowa (JD)

Military service
- Branch: United States Air Force
- Service years: 1953-1955

Robert David Fulton (May 13, 1929 – February 21, 2024) was an American politician who briefly served as the 37th governor of Iowa during the first 16 days of 1969, making him the shortest-serving governor of Iowa. He also served as the lieutenant governor of Iowa from 1965 to 1969.

== Early life and education ==
Fulton was born in Waterloo, Iowa, to Lester and Fern Fulton. He graduated from Waterloo East High School, then earned a Bachelor of Science degree from the Iowa State Teachers College in 1952 and a Juris Doctor from the State University of Iowa College of Law in 1958.

He served from 1953 to 1955 in the Air Force.

== Career ==
Fulton served as a member of the Iowa House of Representatives from 1958 to 1960, and in the Iowa Senate from 1962 to 1964. He then ran for and won the office of lieutenant governor, serving in that role from January 17, 1965 to January 1, 1969. During his tenure as Lt. Governor, he helped to get capital punishment outlawed in Iowa.

He then served briefly as governor from January 1 to January 16, 1969, following Governor Harold Hughes' election to the United States Senate and subsequent resignation. Fulton was the last Democrat to serve as Governor of Iowa until the 1999 inauguration of Tom Vilsack.

Fulton was succeeded as governor by Robert D. Ray on January 16, 1969. Ray had won the gubernatorial election in November 1968, but, as per the state constitution, was not eligible to assume the role of governor until that day.

Fulton ran for a full term as governor in 1970. He narrowly won the Democratic primary, defeating state representative William J. Gannon with just 47% of the vote. He lost in the general election against Robert Ray, the incumbent governor and Fulton's own successor, by a margin of 51% to 47%.

After leaving the governor's office, Fulton served as a member of the Democratic National Committee, and was a delegate to the 1972 Democratic National Convention.

== Personal life and death ==
Fulton was married to Rachel Breault on September 10, 1955. They had four children. He met Rachel at Westover Air Reserve Base while attending an USO event. Rachel died on July 1, 2015, of Alzheimer's disease, aged 82.

For the last decade of his life, Fulton resided at Jones Harrison Senior Living in Minneapolis, Minnesota.

He died on February 21, 2024, in Minneapolis at age 94, of natural causes. At the time of his death, he was the last living former American governor who left office in the 1960s.

Party political offices
Preceded by Melvin H. Wolf	Democratic nominee for Lieutenant Governor of Iowa; 1964, 1968	Succeeded by Andrew G. Frommelt
Preceded by Paul Franzenburg	Democratic nominee for Governor of Iowa; 1970	Succeeded by Paul Franzenburg
Political offices
Preceded by Harold Hughes	Governor of Iowa; 1969	Succeeded by Robert D. Ray
Preceded by W. L. Mooty	Lieutenant Governor of Iowa; 1965–1969	Succeeded by Roger Jepsen
