= 1968 Iowa gubernatorial election =

- November 5, 1968
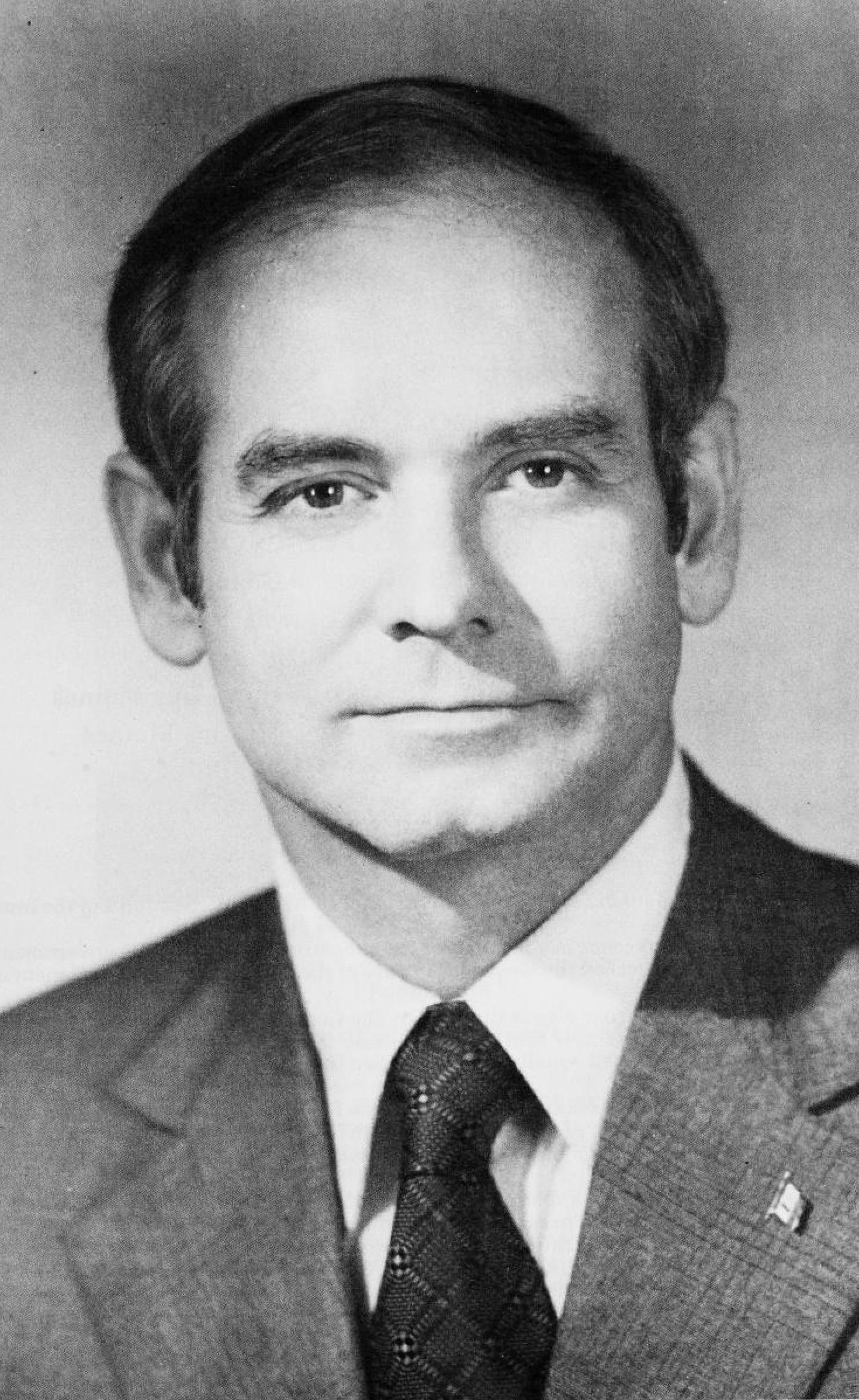

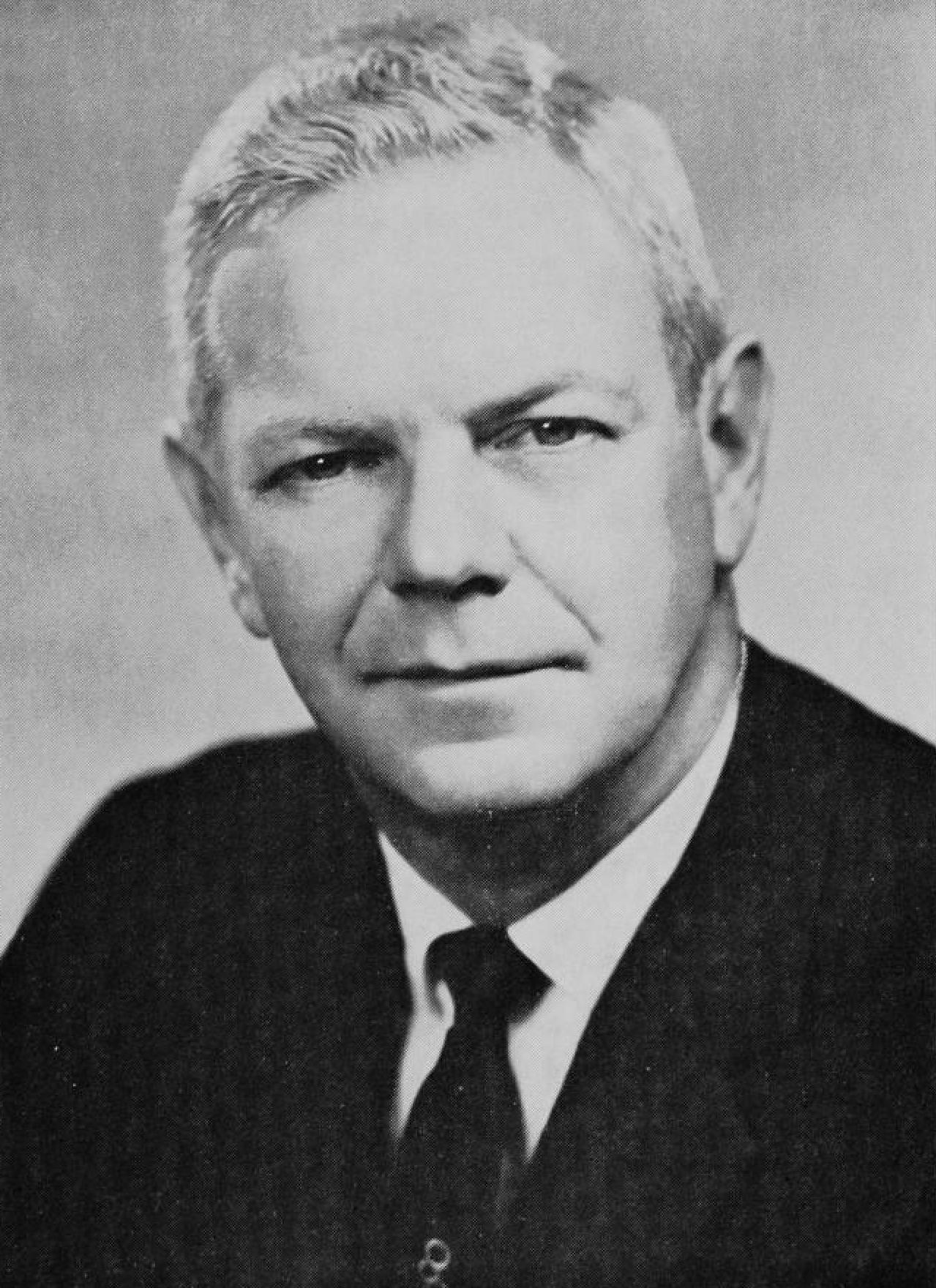
Nominee	Robert D. Ray	Paul Franzenburg
Party	Republican	Democratic
Popular vote	614,328	521,216
Percentage	54.06%	45.86%
- County results Ray: 50–60% 60–70% 70–80% Franzenburg: 50–60%
Governor before election
Harold Hughes
Democratic
Elected Governor
Robert D. Ray
Republican

The 1968 Iowa gubernatorial election was held on November 5, 1968. Incumbent Democrat Harold Hughes did not seek a fourth term, and instead ran successfully for the U.S. Senate. Republican nominee Robert D. Ray defeated Democratic nominee Paul Franzenburg with 54.06% of the vote. No Democrat would be elected Governor of Iowa until 1998.

== Primary elections ==
Primary elections were held on September 3, 1968.

=== Democratic primary ===
==== Candidates ====
- Paul Franzenburg, Treasurer of Iowa

==== Results ====
Democratic primary results
Party	Candidate	Votes	%
Democratic	Paul Franzenburg	101,274	100.00
Total votes		101,274	100.00

=== Republican primary ===
==== Candidates ====
- Robert D. Ray, former Chair of the Iowa Republican Party
- Donald E. Johnson, former Commander of the American Legion
- Robert K. Beck, former State Representative

==== Results ====
Republican primary results
Party	Candidate	Votes	%
Republican	Robert D. Ray	108,744	43.17
Republican	Donald E. Johnson	77,716	30.85
Republican	Robert K. Beck	65,439	25.98
Total votes		251,899	100.00

== General election ==
=== Candidates ===
Major party candidates

- Robert D. Ray, Republican
- Paul Franzenburg, Democratic

Other candidates

- Harry Miller, Prohibition

=== Results ===
1968 Iowa gubernatorial election
Party	Candidate	Votes	%	±%
Republican	Robert D. Ray	614,328	54.06%	
Democratic	Paul Franzenburg	521,216	45.86%	
Prohibition	Harry Miller	938	0.08%	
Majority		92,611		
Turnout		1,135,988		
Republican gain from Democratic		Swing		
