= 1970 Iowa gubernatorial election =

- November 3, 1970
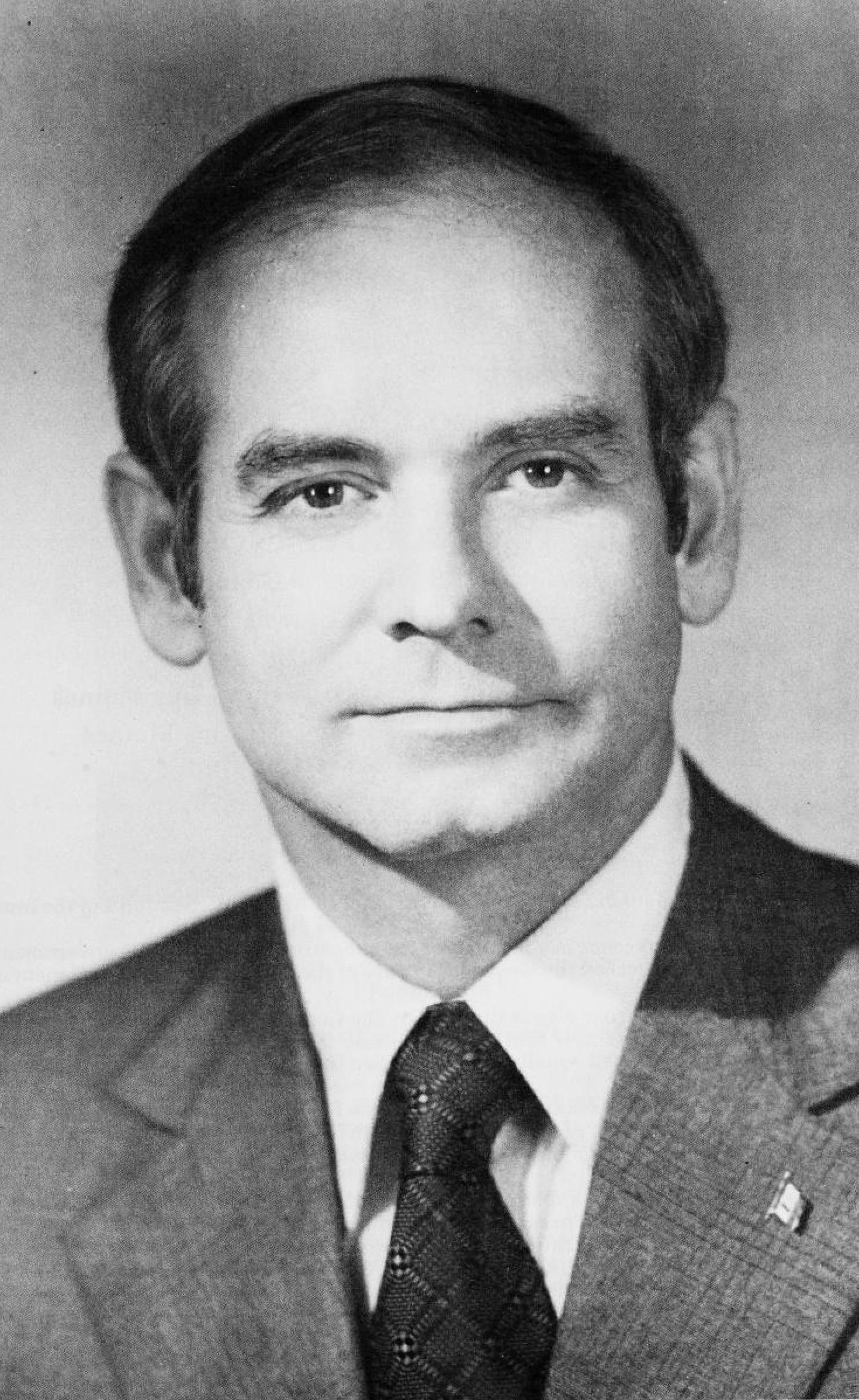

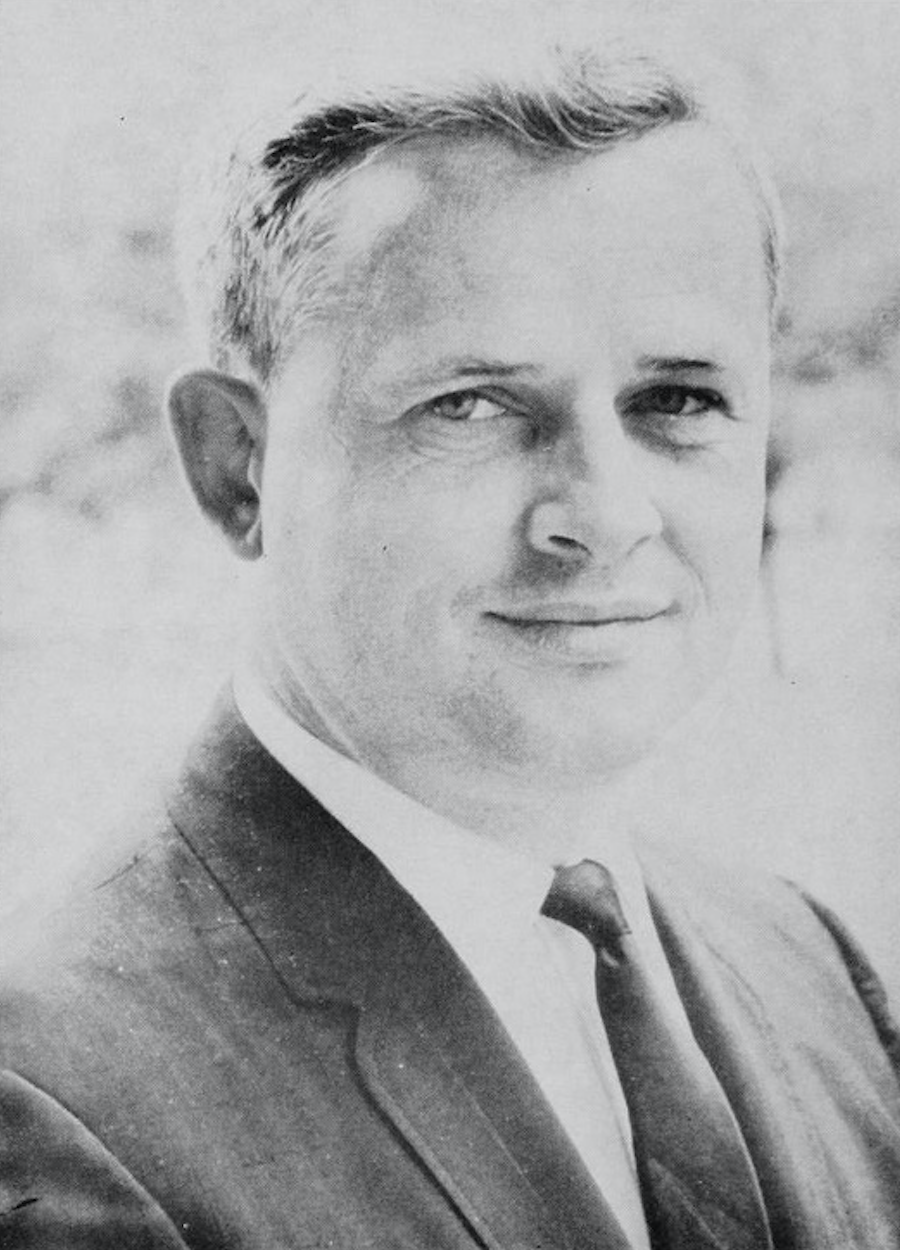
Nominee	Robert D. Ray	Robert D. Fulton
Party	Republican	Democratic
Popular vote	403,394	368,911
Percentage	50.98%	46.62%
- County results Ray: 40–50% 50–60% 60–70% Fulton: 40–50% 50–60%
Governor before election
Robert D. Ray
Republican
Elected Governor
Robert D. Ray
Republican

The 1970 Iowa gubernatorial election was held on November 3, 1970. Incumbent Republican Robert D. Ray narrowly defeated Democratic nominee Robert D. Fulton with 50.98% of the vote.

== Primary elections ==
Primary elections were held on June 2, 1970.

=== Democratic primary ===
==== Candidates ====
- Robert D. Fulton, former Governor
- William J. Gannon, State Representative
- Robert L. Nereim

==== Results ====
Democratic primary results
Party	Candidate	Votes	%
Democratic	Robert D. Fulton	48,459	46.69
Democratic	William J. Gannon	46,524	44.83
Democratic	Robert L. Nereim	8,796	8.48
Democratic	Write-ins	8	0.01
Total votes		103,787	100.00

=== Republican primary ===
==== Candidates ====
- Robert D. Ray, incumbent Governor

==== Results ====
Republican primary results
Party	Candidate	Votes	%
Republican	Robert D. Ray (incumbent)	144,635	99.98
Republican	Write-ins	35	0.02
Total votes		144,670	100.00

== General election ==
=== Candidates ===
Major party candidates

- Robert D. Ray, Republican
- Robert D. Fulton, Democratic

Other candidates

- Robert Dilley, American Independent

=== Results ===
1970 Iowa gubernatorial election
Party	Candidate	Votes	%	±%
Republican	Robert D. Ray (incumbent)	403,394	50.98%	
Democratic	Robert D. Fulton	368,911	46.62%	
American Independent	Robert Dilley	18,933	2.39%	
Write-ins		3	0.00%	
Majority		34,483	4.36%	
Turnout		791,241		
Republican hold		Swing		
