= Paul Franzenburg =

American politician (1916–2004)

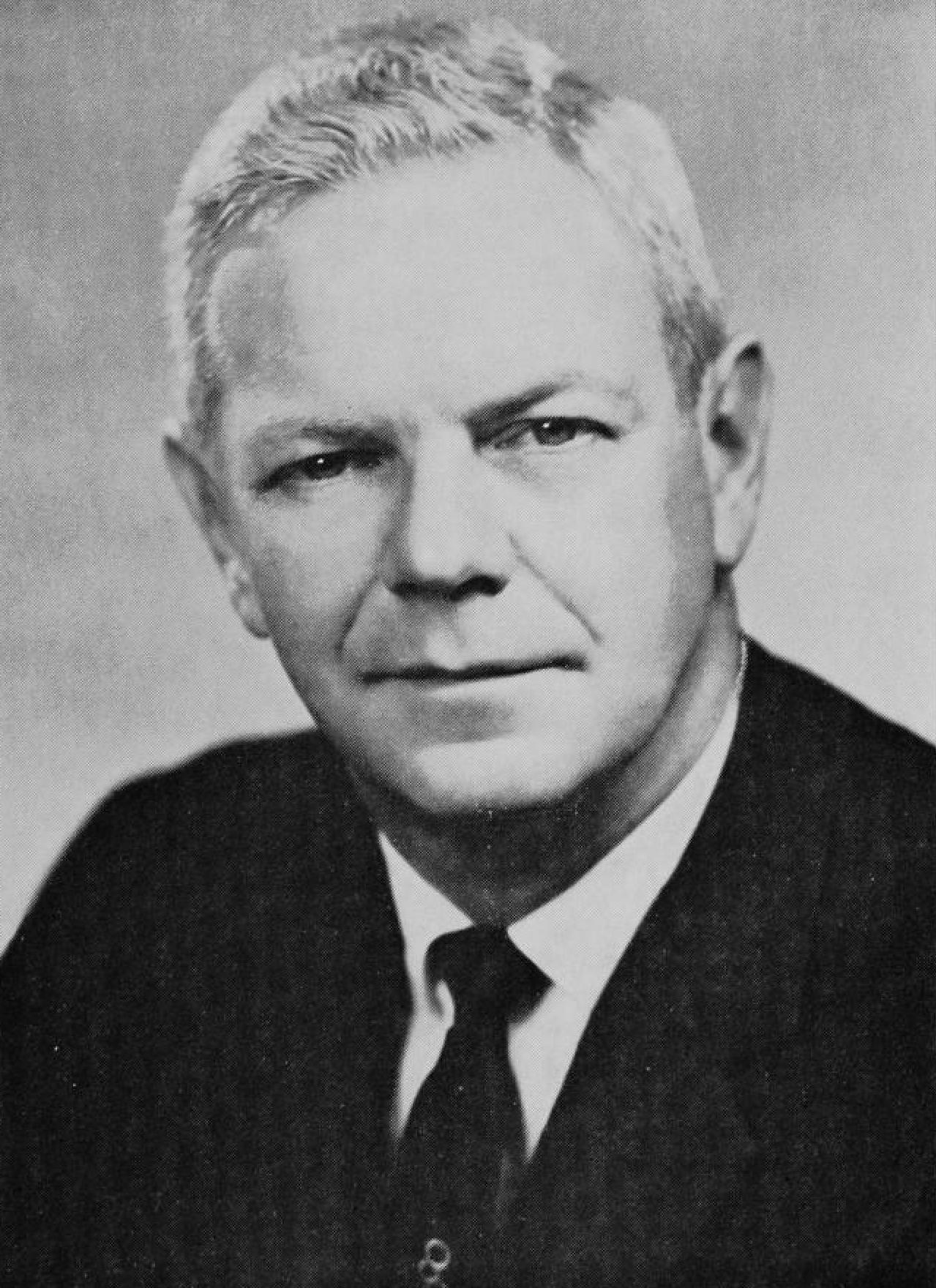

23rd Treasurer of Iowa
- In office 1965–1969
- Preceded by: M. L. Abrahamson
- Succeeded by: Maurice E. Baringer

Personal details
- Born: November 18, 1916 Conrad, Iowa, U.S.
- Died: October 31, 2004 (aged 87) Des Moines, Iowa, U.S.
- Party: Democratic
- Profession: Politician, businessman

Military service
- Allegiance: United States
- Branch/service: United States Army
- Battles/wars: World War II

Paul Franzenburg (November 18, 1916 – October 31, 2004) was an American politician and businessman.

== Biography ==
Franzenburg was born in Conrad, Iowa and graduated from Pierson High School. He help organized the school band. Franzenburg served in the United States Army during World War II. He was involved with the family business: The Franzenburg Provision Company, a meat processing business. Franzenburg served on the Conrad Board of Education and was a Democrat. He served as Treasurer of Iowa from 1965 to 1969. In 1968, he ran for Governor of Iowa, being defeated by incumbent Governor Robert D. Ray. He serve on the Iowa Utilities Board from 1983 until 1991. Franzenburg died at the Iowa Jewish Senior Life Center, in Des Moines, Iowa from heart failure and complications from hip replacement surgery.

== Notes ==
Party political offices
| Preceded by Roy R. Gillette | Democratic nominee for Treasurer of Iowa; 1964, 1966 | Succeeded by John H. Cruise |
| Preceded by Harold Hughes | Democratic nominee for Governor of Iowa; 1968 | Succeeded by Robert D. Fulton |
| Preceded by Robert D. Fulton | Democratic nominee for Governor of Iowa; 1972 | Succeeded by James Schaben |
