= David M. Stanley =

American politician

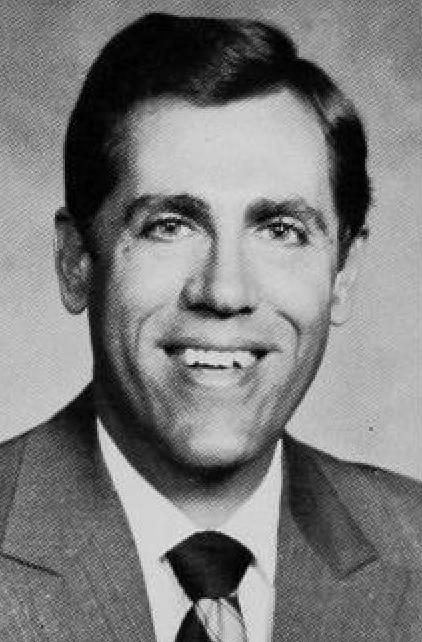

Member of the Iowa House of Representatives
- In office January 1973 – January 1975
- In office January 1959 – January 1965

Member of the Iowa Senate
- In office January 1965 – January 1969

Personal details
- Born: September 9, 1928 Dubuque, Iowa, U.S.
- Died: August 26, 2015 (aged 86) Muscatine, Iowa, U.S.
- Party: Republican
- Occupation: lawyer

David Maxwell Stanley (September 9, 1928 – August 26, 2015) was an American politician in the state of Iowa.

== Career ==
Stanley was born in Dubuque, Iowa in 1928, the son of C. Maxwell and Elizabeth Stanley. He attended the University of Iowa Law School and engaged in the practice of law.

Stanley worked as the Iowa field director for the United World Federalists.

Stanley served in the Iowa State Legislature from 1959 to 1969, when he resigned to run against Fred Schwengel. Stanley also served in the legislature from 1973 to 1975 as a Republican, first serving three terms in the state House, two in the Senate, and once again in the House. In 1974, Stanley ran to fill Harold E. Hughes senate seat but narrowly lost to John Culver.

Stanley also helped create Iowans for Tax Relief and served as its chairman for a time.

== Personal life ==
Stanley married Jean Leu in June 1948.

== Death ==
He died on August 26, 2015.

Party political offices
Preceded by Bourke B. Hickenlooper	Republican nominee for U.S. Senator from Iowa (Class 3); 1968, 1974	Succeeded by Chuck Grassley
