= John Culver =

American politician (1932–2018)

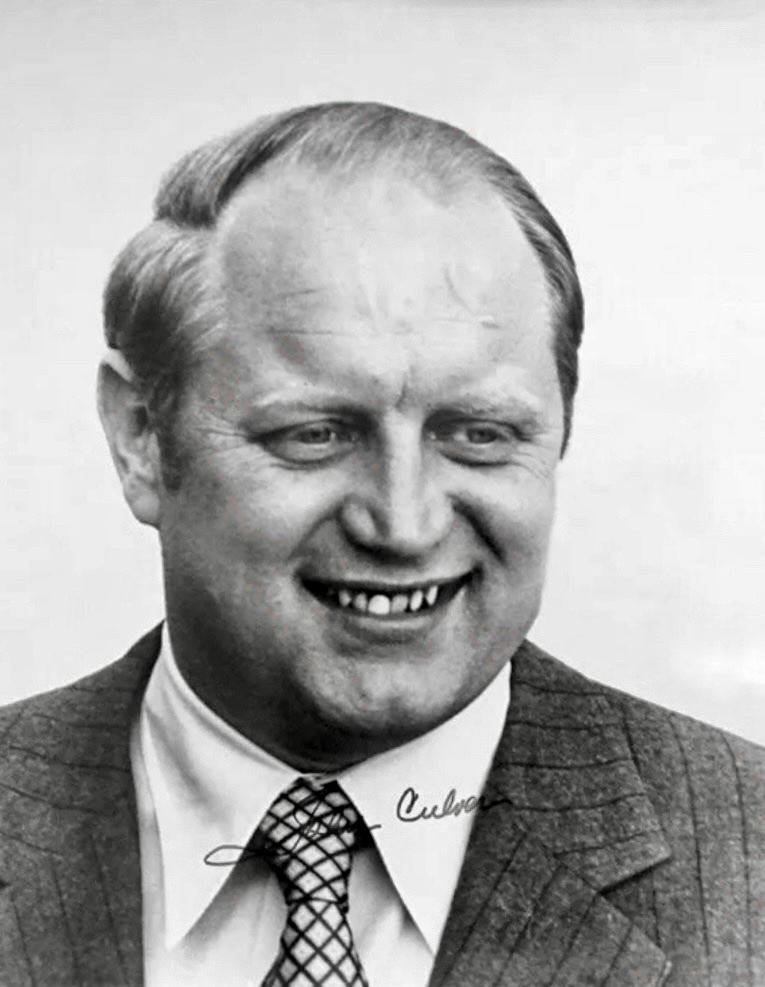

United States Senator from Iowa
- In office January 3, 1975 – January 3, 1981
- Preceded by: Harold Hughes
- Succeeded by: Chuck Grassley

Member of the U.S. House of Representatives from Iowa's 2nd district
- In office January 3, 1965 – January 3, 1975
- Preceded by: James E. Bromwell
- Succeeded by: Mike Blouin

Personal details
- Born: John Chester Culver; August 8, 1932 Rochester, Minnesota, U.S.
- Died: December 26, 2018 (aged 86) Washington, D.C., U.S.
- Party: Democratic
- Spouse(s): Ann Cooper (divorced) Mary Jane Checchi
- Children: 5, including Chet
- Education: Harvard University (BA, JD); Emmanuel College, Cambridge

Military service
- Allegiance: United States
- Branch/service: United States Marine Corps
- Years of service: 1955–1958
- Rank: Captain

John Chester Culver (August 8, 1932 – December 26, 2018) was an American politician, writer, and lawyer who was elected to both the United States House of Representatives (1965–1975) and United States Senate (1975–1981) from Iowa. He was a member of the Democratic Party. His son Chet Culver served as the 41st governor of Iowa (2007–2011).

== Early life and education ==
Culver was born in Rochester, Minnesota, on August 8, 1932, the son of Mary C. (Miller) and William C. Culver. He moved as a child with his family to Cedar Rapids, Iowa.

Culver graduated from both Harvard University and the Harvard Law School. As an undergraduate, he played fullback on the Harvard Crimson football team with future U.S. Senator Ted Kennedy. He was drafted by the Chicago Cardinals in the 27th round of the 1954 NFL draft. Rather than try out for professional football after graduating, Culver attended Emmanuel College, Cambridge, as the Lionel de Jersey Harvard Scholar.

After his return to the U.S., he served in the military as a captain in the United States Marine Corps from 1955 to 1958.

In 1978, Culver was inducted into the Harvard Football Hall of Fame.

== Career ==
Culver became active in politics, working as a legislative assistant for Senator Ted Kennedy, his former Harvard classmate, in 1962. He began his law practice in Iowa a year later. In 1964, he ran against Republican U.S. Representative James E. Bromwell. With President Lyndon B. Johnson's landslide victory, many Democrats, including Culver, were carried to victory.

In 1974, Culver ran for the U.S. Senate, narrowly defeating David M. Stanley with 52% of the vote for the seat left open by the retirement of Harold E. Hughes. Culver served one term in the U.S. Senate, from 1975 until 1981. With Ronald Reagan's national victory as president, Culver was defeated in 1980 by Republican Chuck Grassley, taking 46% of the vote to Grassley's 53%.

In 2000, Culver co-wrote American Dreamer, the first comprehensive biography of Henry A. Wallace.

Culver was a featured speaker at the August 28, 2009, memorial service for Ted Kennedy, speaking as his Harvard classmate and teammate, Senate colleague, and longtime friend.

Until January 31, 2011, Culver was the interim director of the Institute of Politics at the John F. Kennedy School of Government at Harvard University. He was succeeded by former Secretary of State Trey Grayson. Culver remained on the board of advisers as director emeritus.

== Personal life and death ==
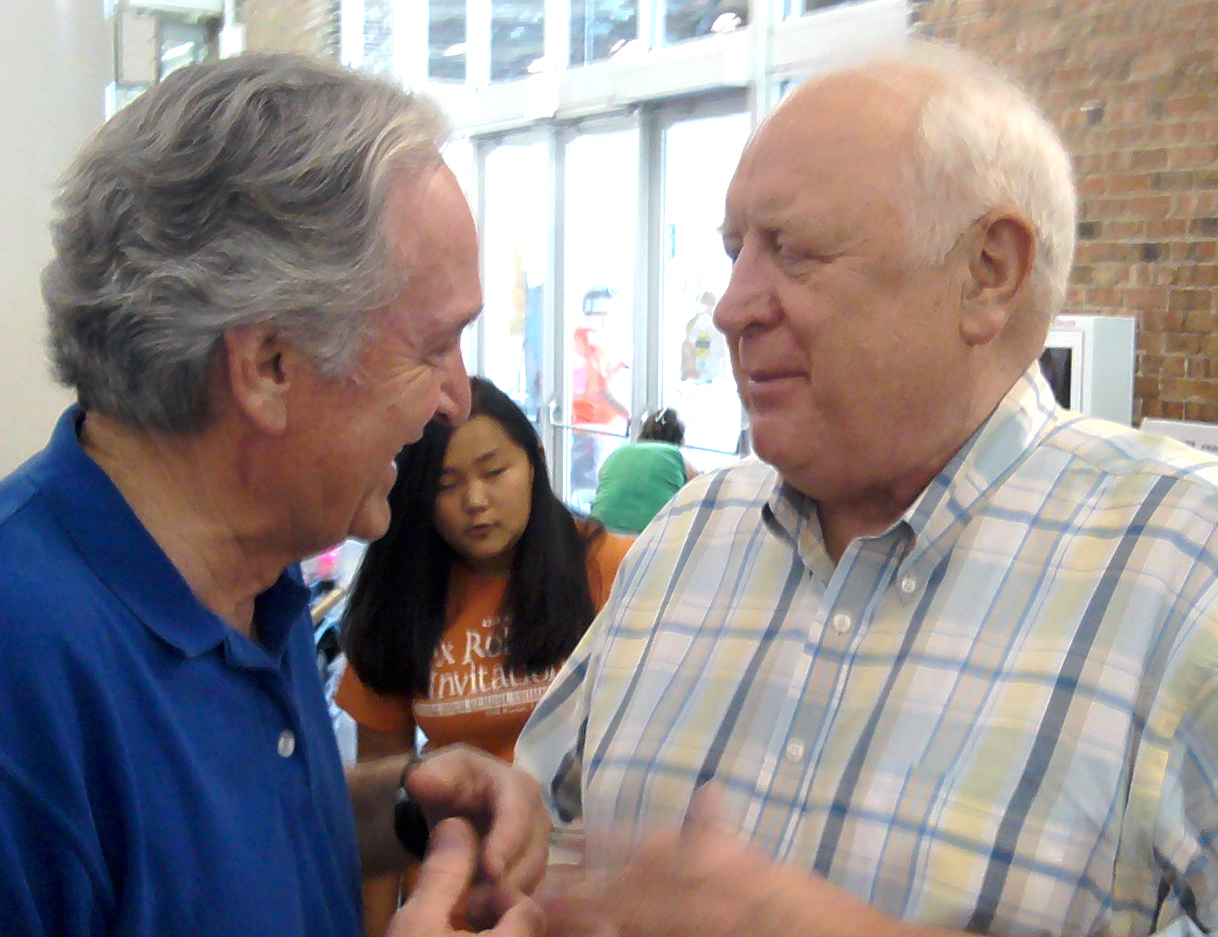
Culver with Tom Harkin in 2010

John Culver and his wife had five children, including Chet, who served as governor of Iowa from 2007 to 2011.

At the time of his death, Culver was recently retired from the firm of Arent Fox in Washington, D.C., where he had established the government affairs practice. After leaving the Senate, he lived and worked in the capital with his wife, Mary Jane Checchi.

Culver died on December 26, 2018, at age 86.

== See also ==
- List of members of the House Un-American Activities Committee

U.S. House of Representatives
Preceded by James E. Bromwell	Member of the U.S. House of Representatives from Iowa's 2nd congressional district 1965–1975	Succeeded by Mike Blouin
Party political offices
Preceded by Harold Hughes	Democratic nominee for U.S. Senator from Iowa (Class 1); 1974, 1980	Succeeded by John Roehrick
U.S. Senate
Preceded by Harold Hughes	U.S. Senator (Class 3) from Iowa; 1975–1981; Served alongside: Dick Clark, Roger Jepsen	Succeeded by Chuck Grassley
New office	Chair of the Senate Operations Commission; 1975–1976	Position abolished
