= 1974 United States Senate election in Iowa =

- November 5, 1974
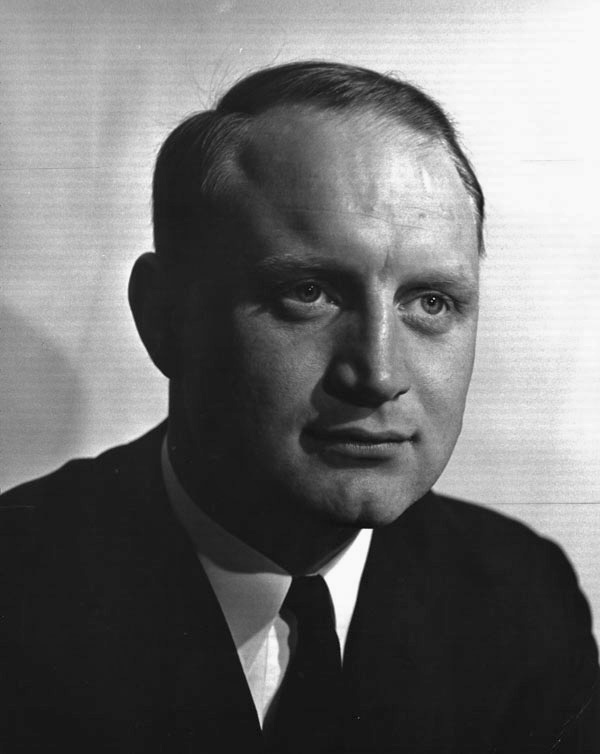

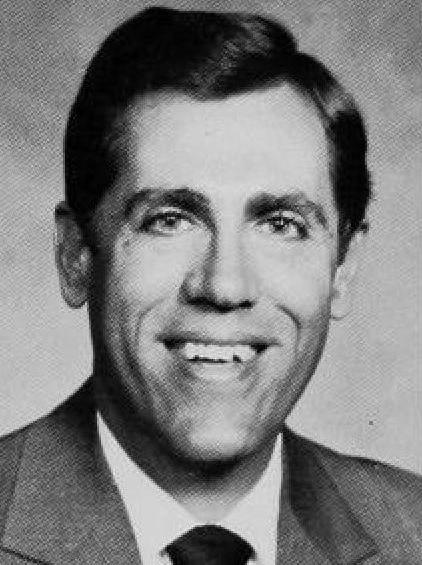
Nominee	John Culver	David M. Stanley
Party	Democratic	Republican
Popular vote	462,947	420,546
Percentage	52.04%	47.28%
- County results Culver: 40–50% 50–60% 60–70% Stanley: 40–50% 50–60% 60–70% 70–80%
U.S. senator before election
Harold Hughes
Democratic
Elected U.S. Senator
John C. Culver
Democratic

The 1974 United States Senate election in Iowa took place on November 5, 1974. Incumbent Democratic U.S. Senator Harold E. Hughes retired. The open seat was won by U.S. Representative John C. Culver, defeating Republican State Representative David M. Stanley. As of 2022, this was the most recent election in which a Democrat, or anyone other than Chuck Grassley, has won the Class 3 Senate seat in Iowa.

== Republican primary ==
=== Candidates ===
- George Milligan, state senator from Des Moines
- David M. Stanley, state representative from Muscatine and nominee for Senate in 1968

=== Results ===
Primary results by county: Stanley: 50–60%; 60–70%; 70–80%; 80–90%; Milligan: 50–60%

Republican primary results
Party	Candidate	Votes	%
Republican	David M. Stanley	87,464	66.93%
Republican	George Milligan	43,206	33.06%
Write-in	All others	6	0.01%
Total votes		130,676	100.00%

== General election ==
=== Results ===
1974 United States Senate election in Iowa
Party	Candidate	Votes	%	±%
Democratic	John C. Culver	462,947	52.04%	▲1.79
Republican	David M. Stanley	420,546	47.28%	▼2.41
American Independent	Lorin Oxley	6,028	0.68%	N/A
Write-ins		40	0.00%	N/A
Total votes		889,561	100.00%	
Democratic hold		Swing		

== See also ==
- 1974 United States Senate elections
