= 1966 Iowa gubernatorial election =

- November 8, 1966
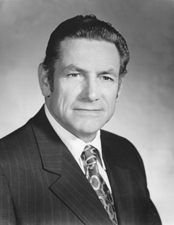

Nominee	Harold Hughes	William G. Murray
Party	Democratic	Republican
Popular vote	494,259	394,518
Percentage	55.34%	44.17%
- County results Hughes: 50–60% 60–70% 70–80% Murray: 40–50% 50–60% 60–70%
Governor before election
Harold Hughes
Democratic
Elected Governor
Harold Hughes
Democratic

The 1966 Iowa gubernatorial election was held on November 8, 1966. Incumbent Democrat Harold Hughes defeated Republican nominee William G. Murray with 55.34% of the vote. This was the last time a Democrat was elected governor of Iowa until 1998.

== Primary elections ==
Primary elections were held on September 6, 1966.

=== Democratic primary ===
==== Candidates ====
- Harold Hughes, incumbent Governor

==== Results ====
Democratic primary results
Party	Candidate	Votes	%
Democratic	Harold Hughes (incumbent)	80,198	100.00
Total votes		80,198	100.00

=== Republican primary ===
==== Candidates ====
- William G. Murray, Iowa State University Professor of Economics
- Robert K. Beck, former State Representative

==== Results ====
Republican primary results
Party	Candidate	Votes	%
Republican	William G. Murray	87,371	50.5
Republican	Robert K. Beck	85,733	49.5
Total votes		173,109	100.00

== General election ==
=== Candidates ===
Major party candidates

- Harold Hughes, Democratic
- William G. Murray, Republican

Other candidates

- David B. Quiner, Independent
- Charles Sloca, Independent

=== Results ===
1966 Iowa gubernatorial election
Party	Candidate	Votes	%	±%
Democratic	Harold Hughes (incumbent)	494,259	55.34%	
Republican	William G. Murray	394,518	44.17%	
Independent	David B. Quiner	3,680	0.41%	
Independent	Charles Sloca	715	0.08%	
Majority		99,741		
Turnout		893,175		
Democratic hold		Swing		
