= 1962 Iowa gubernatorial election =

- November 6, 1962
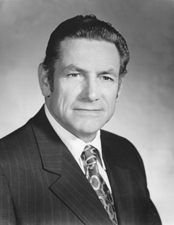

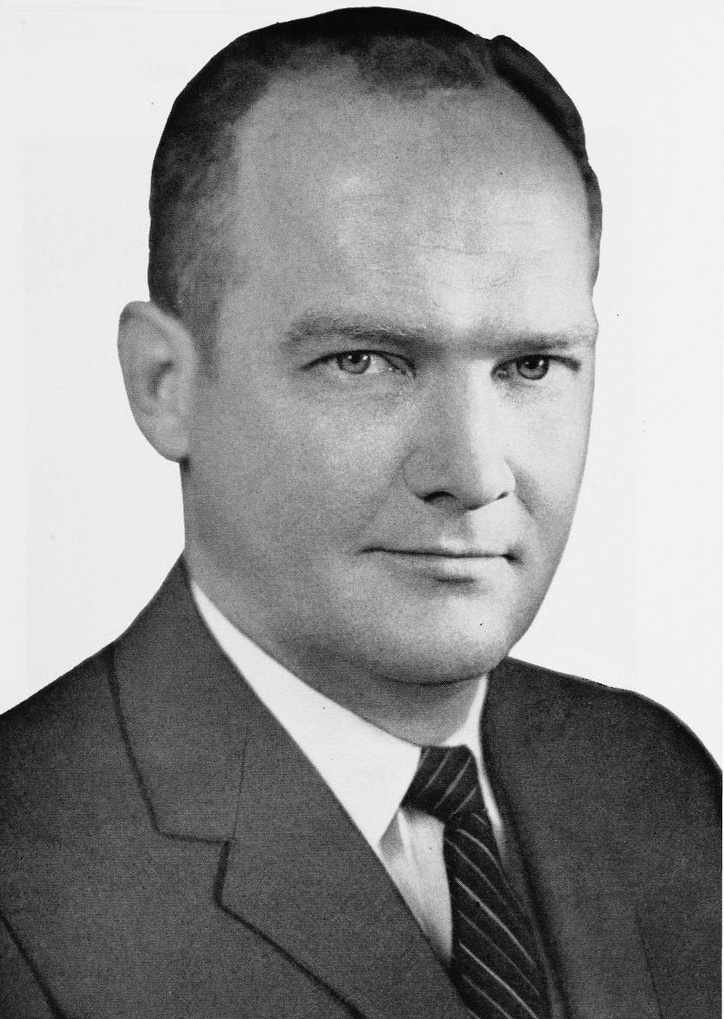
Nominee	Harold Hughes	Norman A. Erbe
Party	Democratic	Republican
Popular vote	430,899	388,955
Percentage	52.56%	47.44%
- County results Hughes: 50–60% 60–70% Erbe: 50–60% 60–70% 70–80%
Governor before election
Norman Erbe
Republican
Elected Governor
Harold Hughes
Democratic

The 1962 Iowa gubernatorial election was held on November 6, 1962. Democratic nominee Harold Hughes defeated incumbent Republican Norman A. Erbe with 52.56% of the vote.

== Primary elections ==
Primary elections were held on June 4, 1962.

=== Democratic primary ===
==== Candidates ====
- Harold Hughes, Chairman of the State Commerce Commission
- Lewis E. Lint

==== Results ====
Democratic primary results
Party	Candidate	Votes	%
Democratic	Harold Hughes	66,624	78.9
Democratic	Lewis E. Lint	17,770	21.1
Total votes		84,394	100.00

=== Republican primary ===
==== Candidates ====
- Norman A. Erbe, incumbent Governor
- William H. Nicholas, former Lieutenant Governor

==== Results ====
Republican primary results
Party	Candidate	Votes	%
Republican	Norman A. Erbe (incumbent)	134,010	67.7
Republican	William H. Nicholas	63,966	32.3
Total votes		197,976	100.00

== General election ==
=== Candidates ===
- Harold Hughes, Democratic
- Norman A. Erbe, Republican

=== Results ===
1962 Iowa gubernatorial election
Party	Candidate	Votes	%	±%
Democratic	Harold Hughes	430,899	52.56%	
Republican	Norman A. Erbe (incumbent)	388,955	47.44%	
Majority		41,944		
Turnout		819,854		
Democratic gain from Republican		Swing		
