= 1972 Iowa gubernatorial election =

- November 7, 1972
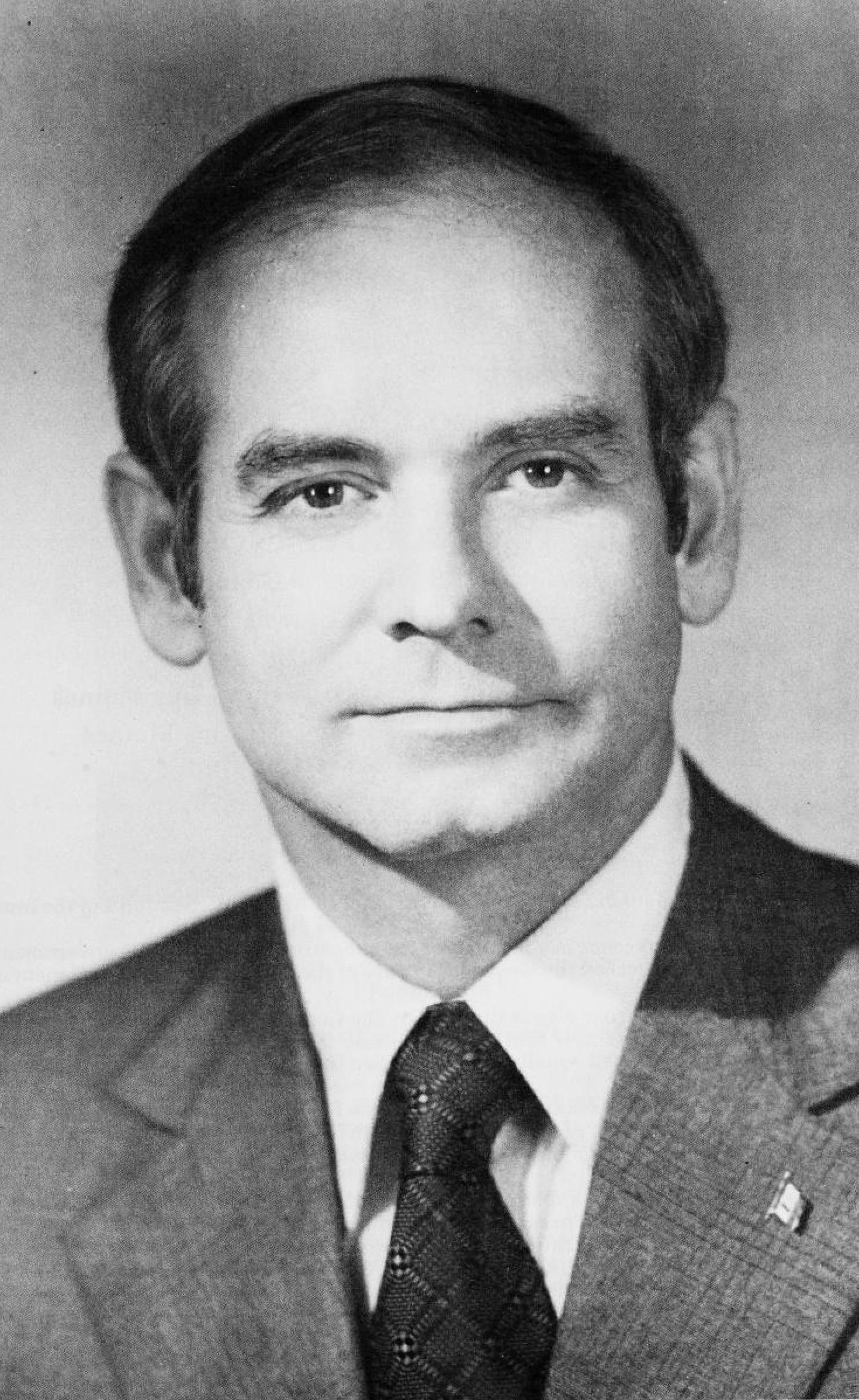

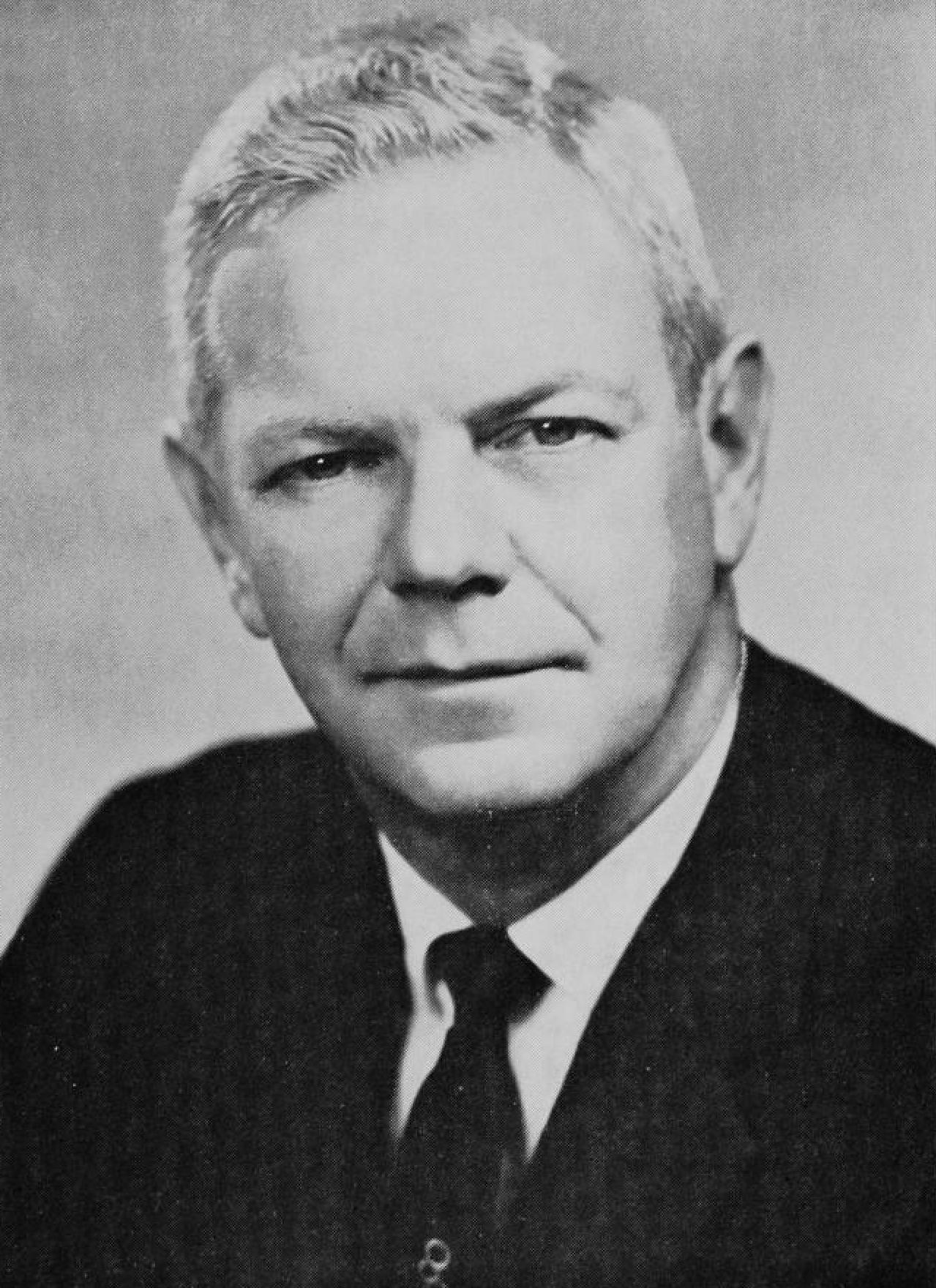
Nominee	Robert D. Ray	Paul Franzenburg
Party	Republican	Democratic
Popular vote	707,177	487,282
Percentage	58.43%	40.26%
- County results Ray: 40–50% 50–60% 60–70% 70–80%
Governor before election
Robert D. Ray
Republican
Elected Governor
Robert D. Ray
Republican

The 1972 Iowa gubernatorial election was held on November 7, 1972. Incumbent Republican Robert D. Ray defeated Democratic nominee Paul Franzenburg with 58.43% of the vote.

This was the last gubernatorial election in Iowa in which either party won every county. It was also the last election for a two-year term, with Iowa (alongside Arkansas, Kansas, Rhode Island, South Dakota, Texas and, as of date, Vermont and New Hampshire) being one of the last states to maintain two-year, as opposed to four-year gubernatorial terms.

== Primary elections ==
=== Republican primary ===
==== Candidates ====
- Robert D. Ray, incumbent Governor of Iowa

===== Withdrew =====
- Roger Jepsen, Lieutenant Governor of Iowa

== General election ==
=== Candidates ===
Major party candidates

- Paul Franzenburg, Democratic
- Robert D. Ray, Republican

Other candidates

- Robert Dilley, American Independent

=== Results ===
1972 Iowa gubernatorial election
Party	Candidate	Votes	%	±%
Republican	Robert D. Ray (incumbent)	707,177	58.43%	+7.45%
Democratic	Paul Franzenburg	487,282	40.26%	−6.36%
American Independent	Robert Dilley	15,715	1.30%	−1.09%
Write-ins		48	0.00%	
Majority		219,895	18.17%	
Turnout		1,210,222		
Republican hold		Swing		
