= Harold Hughes =

American politician (1922–1996)

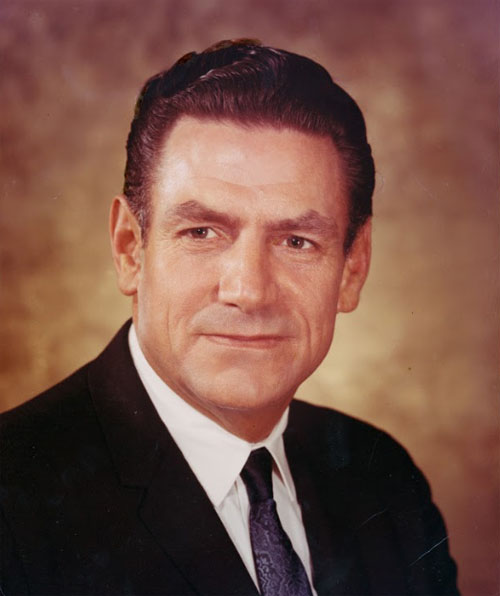
- Official portrait of Hughes as Governor

United States Senator from Iowa
- In office January 3, 1969 – January 3, 1975
- Preceded by: Bourke Hickenlooper
- Succeeded by: John Culver

36th Governor of Iowa
- In office January 17, 1963 – January 1, 1969
- Lieutenant: W. L. Mooty; Robert D. Fulton
- Preceded by: Norman A. Erbe
- Succeeded by: Robert D. Fulton

Personal details
- Born: Harold Everett Hughes; February 10, 1922 Ida Grove, Iowa, U.S.
- Died: October 23, 1996 (aged 74) Glendale, Arizona, U.S.
- Party: Republican (before 1960); Democratic (1960–1996)
- Spouses: Eva Mercer (m. 1941; div. 1987); Julianne Holm (m. 1987)
- Children: 3
- Education: University of Iowa (attended)

Military service
- Allegiance: United States
- Branch/service: United States Army
- Years of service: 1942–1945
- Rank: Private
- Unit: 16th InfantryRegiment, 1st Infantry Division
- Battles/wars: World War II; Algeria-French Morocco; Tunisia; Italian campaign; Operation Husky; Battle of Troina; Northern France; Operation Overlord; Operation Cobra; Rhineland; Battle of the Mons pocket; Battle of Aachen; Battle of Hürtgen Forest; Battle of the Bulge; Battle of Elsenborn Ridge; Central Europe; Operation Lumberjack; Battle of Remagen

Harold Everett Hughes (February 10, 1922 – October 23, 1996) was an American politician who served as the 36th governor of Iowa from 1963 until 1969, and as a U.S. senator from Iowa from 1969 until 1975. He began his political career as a Republican but changed his affiliation to the Democratic Party in 1960.

== Early years ==
Hughes was born in 1922 in Ida Grove, Iowa, to Lewis C. Hughes and Etta Estelle (Kelly) Hughes. He attended the University of Iowa on a football scholarship in 1940, but left after marrying Eva Mercer in August 1941. They had 3 daughters.

On June 1, 1942, his brother Jesse was killed in a car accident when their vehicle struck a concrete bridge and fell into a river 15 feet below. Jesse, along with Leroy Conrad, were going to be inducted into the Army the following week, due to Selective Service. Two girls, along with Leroy and Jesse, died in the crash as well. Jesse's death was attributed as a leading cause of Hughes's alcoholism and his renunciation of his Methodist faith.

=== Military ===
He was drafted in 1942.

He served in the United States Army, fighting in the North African campaign, and was court-martialed for assaulting an officer. The trial resulted in Hughes's being sent to fight, with the 16th Infantry of the 1st Division, in Sicily in 1943. He became ill and another soldier took his place on a landing craft at Anzio. The craft exploded, killing his replacement and many others. He was sent stateside for the rest of the war after contracting jaundice and malaria.

=== Marriages ===
Hughes and his first wife, Eva, divorced in 1987. Six weeks after the divorce, he married his former secretary, Julie Holm, with whom he had been living with for a year while he was separated from Eva. Hughes moved to Arizona and lived in a single-family home with his second wife, while his first wife lived in a one-bedroom apartment in Iowa.

Hughes and his former wife got into bitter alimony and child support battles in the late 1980s and early 1990s. Hughes's former wife claimed that he had completely cut off her annuities and health insurance, while Hughes claimed that he himself did not have money. Ultimately, Hughes was ordered to pay back over $10,000 to his former wife, which she successfully collected from his estate. Because of the Harold Hughes Center's declining fortunes, Hughes owed approximately $80,000 to creditors in the 1990s. Combined with increasing medical expenses and the court-ordered alimony payments, Hughes's debts increased dramatically during his last years, and he died virtually bankrupt.

== Political career ==
Hughes's interest in politics was stirred by involvement in the trucking industry. He became a manager of a local trucking business, and then began organizing independent truckers. Hughes started the Iowa Better Trucking Bureau and was eventually elected to the State Commerce Commission board, which he served from 1958 to 1962, including a term as its chairman.

In 1952, after years as an alcoholic, Hughes attempted suicide. He described in his book how he climbed into a bathtub (to make the mess easier to clean up) with a shotgun, ready to pull the trigger, when he cried out to God for help. He had a spiritual experience that changed the course of his life. He began to pray and study the Bible diligently, and even considered a career in the ministry. He also embraced the Alcoholics Anonymous program of recovery and started an AA group in Ida Grove in 1955.

== Governor of Iowa ==
=== 1960 gubernatorial campaign ===
Hughes grew up as a Republican in a heavily Republican area, but was persuaded to switch parties. His service on the State Commerce Commission also brought him in contact with the Interstate Commerce Commission and national politics.

He then ran for Governor of Iowa on the Democratic ticket in 1960 but lost the Democratic primary to Edward McManus by 28,448 votes. McManus then lost the general election to Norman A. Erbe.

=== 1962 gubernatorial campaign and first term ===
Hughes ran again for governor in 1962, beating Lewis E. Lint in the Democratic primary by 48,854 votes. Hughes ran again and defeated incumbent Republican Norman Erbe by 41,944 votes.

A major issue in that campaign was legalization of liquor-by-the-drink. Iowa allowed only beer to be consumed over the bar. Liquor and wine could be purchased only in state liquor stores and private clubs. Hughes became a proponent of liquor-by-the-drink. A short time after he was elected, the state adopted a new system of alcohol control.

Hughes served as governor from 1963 to 1969. During this time, he continued to reach out, as a Christian and an alcoholic in recovery, to people still suffering. He established a treatment program in the state and was an effective spokesman for a more enlightened view of the role of alcohol in society. The new treatment program was viewed as an alternative to the state mental hospitals. Hughes wrote that the goal was to reach alcoholics "before they reach rock bottom."

He played a role in the enactment of several amendments to the Iowa Constitution: two providing for legislative reapportionment and Iowa Supreme Court review of reapportionment, one initiating an annual session of the General Assembly, and finally another to give the governor a line item veto.

During Hughes's tenure, he oversaw the institution of a state scholarship program, issued an agricultural tax credit, created a state civil rights commission, and passed a property tax replacement bill. Hughes implemented an educational radio television system and helped improved workmen's and unemployment compensation laws. Hughes sanctioned additional state funding for school aid and authorized a consumer safeguard bill. Hughes also helped eliminate the death penalty in Iowa.

A death penalty opponent, Hughes reached out to President John F. Kennedy to request he commute the death sentence of Victor Feguer, who had been convicted on federal murder charges. The President was the only one who could commute the sentence, but Kennedy thought the crime was so brutal that he denied the request.

Meanwhile, Hughes's political career continued to gain strength. He made a speech seconding the nomination of Lyndon B. Johnson at the 1964 Democratic convention—a decision he would eventually regret—and gained national recognition as a liberal governor as well as a promising national figure in the Democratic Party. Trade missions abroad, and a tour of Vietnam with other governors, provided him with foreign policy experience.

=== 1964 gubernatorial election second term ===
In his 1964 bid for reelection as governor, Hughes's opponent, Evan Hultman, called attention to Hughes's brief relapse into alcoholism in 1954. In a debate, Hultman charged that Hughes's failure to acknowledge the relapse publicly showed that Hughes lacked integrity. Hughes responded, "I am an alcoholic and will be until the day I die.... But with God's help I'll never touch a drop of alcohol again. Now, can we talk about the issues of this campaign?" According to the Des Moines Register', "The reaction of the crowd was immediate and nearly unanimous." Later, the Register editorialized, "In our opinion, any man or woman who wins that battle and successfully puts the pieces of his or her life back together again deserves commendation, not censure." Hughes defeated Hultman in a landslide, winning all but two of the state's 99 counties.

=== 1966 Iowa gubernatorial election and third term ===
In 1966, Hughes won the Democratic primary without opposition. He then defeated William G. Murray in the general election by 99,741 votes.

He resigned as governor on January 1, 1969, just two days before being sworn in as U.S. Senator. He was succeeded by Lieutenant Governor Robert D. Fulton.

=== U.S. Senator from Iowa ===
==== Elections ====
In 1966, his friendship with Robert F. Kennedy started, and it was Kennedy who encouraged him to run for a Senate seat. The next years were difficult, in the wake of the 1968 assassinations of Kennedy and of Martin Luther King Jr., racial unrest in Iowa, and his increasing disappointment with American policy in Vietnam and the leadership of the Johnson administration.

At the 1968 Democratic National Convention, Hughes was giving a nominating speech for anti-war candidate Eugene McCarthy when violent demonstrations erupted on the streets of Chicago. In the general election in 1968, Hughes was a heavy favorite to defeat Republican candidate David M. Stanley, a state senator from Muscatine, for the U.S. Senate seat being vacated by Republican Bourke Hickenlooper. Hughes narrowly defeated Stanley, and took his seat on January 3, 1969.

===== Leader on alcoholism and narcotics addiction =====
As a U.S. Senator, Hughes persuaded the chairman of the Senate's Labor and Public Welfare Committee to establish a Special Sub-committee on Alcoholism and Narcotics, chaired by Hughes himself. This subcommittee, which gave unprecedented attention to the subject, held public hearings on July 23–25, 1969. A number of people in recovery testified, including Academy Award-winning actress Mercedes McCambridge, National Council on Alcoholism founder Marty Mann, and AA co-founder Bill W. In his autobiography, The Man from Ida Grove: A Senator's Personal Story, Hughes writes that he asked a dozen other well-known people in recovery to present public testimony, but all declined. The hearings were considered by some in AA a threat to anonymity and sobriety.

Hughes also talked about the need for treatment of drug addiction. He stated that "treatment is virtually nonexistent because addiction is not recognized as an illness." The hearings, and subsequent events related to alcoholism and addiction, were not given much press attention because the press was more interested in the Vietnam War, poverty, and other critical issues. Legislation creating the National Institute on Drug Abuse was not passed until 1974.

The goal of the Comprehensive Drug Abuse Prevention and Control Act of 1970, considered a "major milestone" in the nation's efforts to deal with alcohol abuse and alcoholism, was "to help millions of alcoholics recover and save thousands of lives on highways, reduce crime, decrease the welfare rolls, and cut down the appalling economic waste from alcoholism." It also established the National Institute on Alcohol Abuse and Alcoholism. He also created the Society of Americans for Recovery.

==== Touted as a presidential "dark horse" ====
In early 1970, Hughes began to get press recognition as a "dark horse candidate" for the 1972 presidential election. Columnist David Broder described him as "a very dark horse, but the only Democrat around who excites the kind of personal enthusiasm the Kennedys used to generate." In 1971, Hughes denounced Nixon's secret wiretapping, done through the FBI.

He seemed to observers to be an almost reluctant candidate, though, and a bit too much of a "mystic" for the Washington press corps. Columnist Mary McGrory wrote of him: "He hates small talk, he likes a heavy rap. He talks about religion, and about drugs and alcohol. He hated being trotted out to cajole financiers wanting to look him over before opening the checkbook. His staff had to prod him to call party chairmen. Hughes preferred a session with the kids at the local treatment centers." The Washington establishment was not too surprised when he dropped out of the race.

According to Hunter S. Thompson, Gary Hart suggested after the '72 campaign that Hughes might have been the only Democratic candidate who could have defeated Nixon.

He would then join Maine Senator Edmund Muskie's campaign as campaign manager.

==== Decision not to seek re-election ====
On September 5, 1973, Hughes announced that, after a long period of soul-searching, he would retire from the Senate when his term was completed. He said that, for "profoundly personal religious reasons" he would seek "a new kind of challenge and spiritual opportunity," and would "continue efforts in alcoholism and drug treatment fields, working for social causes and world peace." He said: "Rightly or wrongly, I believe that I can move more people through a spiritual approach more effectively than I have been able to achieve through the political approach."

In 1974, his last full year in the Senate, he succeeded in passing legislation that extended and expanded the original 1970 act. He was invited to the signing of the bill by President Nixon, but "couldn't bring myself to attend, since his administration had fought it every inch of the way." Democratic Congressman John Culver defeated Stanley, whom Hughes had defeated in 1968, to succeed Hughes in 1974.

== Post-Senate years and retirement ==
After he left the Senate, Hughes devoted himself to lay religious work for two foundations based in Washington and also founded a religious retreat at Cedar Point Farms in Maryland (owned by Hughes himself). He had been active in prayer groups while serving in the Senate, and the last few chapters of his autobiography gave this aspect of his life special prominence. Hughes partnered with former Nixon aide Charles Colson in his religious work, and even portrayed himself in the 1978 motion picture Born Again, starring Dean Jones as Colson. He also remained a strong advocate for services to chemically dependent people. For some years during the 1970s, Hughes served as the president of the Fellowship Foundation (also known informally in Washington as The Family). Hughes hosted prayer meetings for The Family at his Cedar Point Farms facility, even hosting President Jimmy Carter there in 1978.

After his retirement, Hughes served as a consultant to the Senate and the Senate Judiciary Committee for a year. He then started the Harold Hughes Foundation and opened the Harold Hughes Centers for Alcoholism and Drug Treatment.

After some time in Iowa, Hughes considered running in 1982 for governor, but did not due to a residency issue.

=== Legacy ===
The National Institute on Alcohol Abuse and Alcoholism (NIAAA) created an award named the Senator Harold Hughes Memorial Award in honor of Hughes's work on the Comprehensive Drug Abuse Prevention and Control Act of 1970, which helped to create the NIAAA.

In 1974, he was awarded Pacem in Terris Peace and Freedom Award. This is a Catholic award given for "to honor a person for their achievements in peace and justice, not only in their country but in the world". He was awarded for bringing "the message of the Gospel to the cause of equal education, civil rights and opposition to capital punishment."

=== Death ===
Hughes moved to a retirement community in Glendale, Arizona. He died in his sleep in Glendale in 1996, at the age of 74. His remains were returned to Iowa and buried in Ida Grove. Hughes's first wife, Eva Mercer, died in 2017. Hughes's second wife, Julianne, died in 2001 in Winterset, Iowa, aged 57, of cancer.

== See also ==
- Hughes–Ryan Act
- Fellowship Foundation
- National Prayer Breakfast
- Christian fundamentalism
- Christian right

Party political offices
Preceded by Edward J. McManus	Democratic nominee for Governor of Iowa; 1962, 1964, 1966	Succeeded by Paul Franzenburg
Preceded by John Connally	Chair of the Democratic Governors Association; 1966–1968	Succeeded by Robert Evander McNair
Preceded by Elbert B. Smith	Democratic nominee for U.S. Senator from Iowa (Class 3); 1968	Succeeded by John Culver
Political offices
Preceded by Norman A. Erbe	Governor of Iowa; 1963–1969	Succeeded by Robert D. Fulton
U.S. Senate
Preceded by Bourke B. Hickenlooper	U.S. Senator (Class 3) from Iowa; 1969–1975; Served alongside: Jack Miller, Dick Clark	Succeeded by John Culver
