= Robert D. Ray =

American politician (1928–2018)

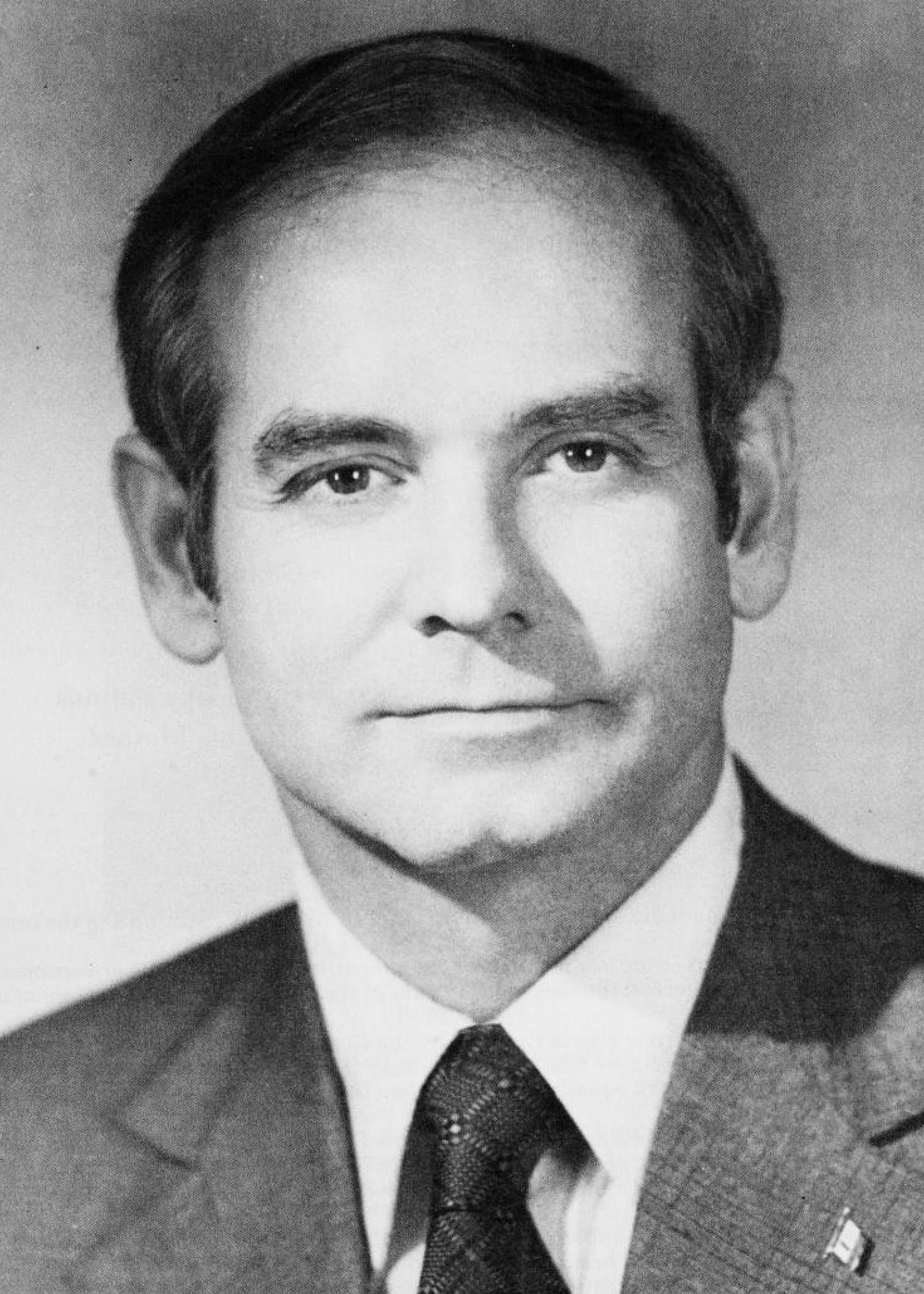
- Ray in 1977

38th Governor of Iowa
- In office January 16, 1969 – January 14, 1983
- Lieutenant Governor: Roger Jepsen; Arthur Neu; Terry Branstad
- Preceded by: Robert D. Fulton
- Succeeded by: Terry Branstad

President of Drake University (interim)
- In office 1998

Mayor of Des Moines
- Acting
- In office May 5, 1997 – November 3, 1997
- Preceded by: Arthur Davis
- Succeeded by: Preston Daniels

Chair of the National Governors Association
- In office June 8, 1975 – July 4, 1976
- Preceded by: Cal Rampton
- Succeeded by: Cecil Andrus

Personal details
- Born: Robert Dolph Ray; September 26, 1928 Des Moines, Iowa, U.S.
- Died: July 8, 2018 (aged 89) Des Moines, Iowa, U.S.
- Party: Republican
- Spouse: Billie Hornberger (m. 1951)
- Children: 3 daughters
- Education: Drake University (BA, LLB)

Military service
- Allegiance: United States
- Branch/service: United States Army
- Years of service: 1946-1948

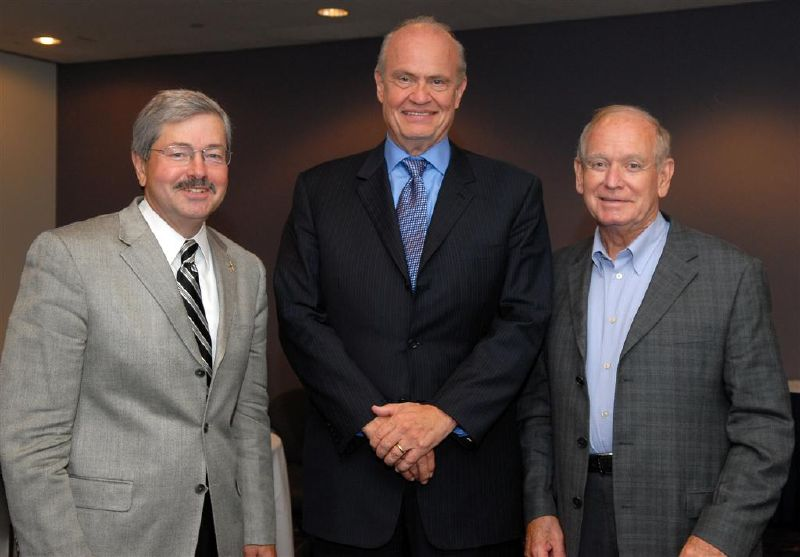
Ray (right) poses for a photograph in 2007 with fellow former Iowa governor Terry Branstad (left) and then-presidential candidate Fred Thompson (center)

Robert Dolph Ray (September 26, 1928 – July 8, 2018) was an American lawyer and politician. A member of the Republican Party, he served as the 38th governor of Iowa from January 16, 1969 to January 14, 1983.

During his tenure as governor, Ray served as chair of the National Governors Association from 1975 to 1976; led to the passage of the Iowa Burials Protection Act of 1976, which was the first legislative act in the United States that specifically protected American Indian remains; and accepted thousands of refugees into Iowa.

In his later years, Ray served as acting mayor of Des Moines from May 1997 to November 1997 and was interim president of Drake University in 1998.

== Early life and education ==
Ray was born in Des Moines, Iowa, in 1928, to Clark Ray and Mildred Helen Ray. He graduated from Theodore Roosevelt High School in 1946. Later in 1946, with the permission of his parents, he joined the United States Army and spent two years in Japan as part of the first wave of relief troops after World War II.

Ray received a Bachelor of Arts degree in business from Drake University in 1952, and a law degree in 1954. He then was a law and reading clerk for the Iowa State Senate. He also practiced law in Des Moines. On December 22, 1951, Ray married Billie Lee Hornberger, his highschool sweetheart and had three daughters.

== Political career ==
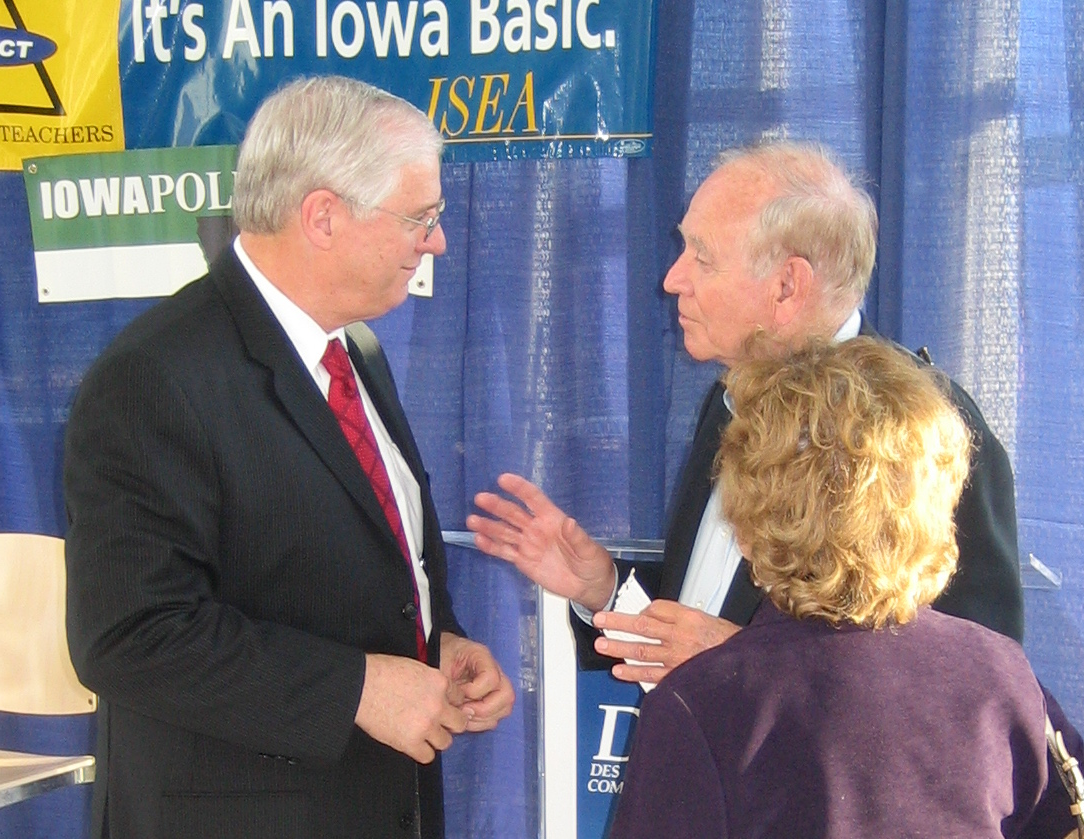
Ray, accompanied by his wife Billie, speaks in 2008 with National Education Association president Dennis Van Roekel (left)

=== Early career ===
Ray began his career as a trial lawyer. Following several years practicing law, Ray became chair of the Iowa Republican Party in 1963 until 1967. Ray supported Pennsylvania governor William Scranton in the 1964 Republican presidential primaries. He was named one of America’s young leaders by Time Magazine in 1974. He was on the short list to be Vice President on the Republican ticket in the 1976 Presidential Election. He was also offered, twice, to join President Gerald Ford's cabinet, but refused both offers.

=== Governor of Iowa ===
Ray in 1976

He was elected in the 1968 Iowa gubernatorial election and became the Governor of Iowa in 1969. During Ray's time in office, the Iowa Constitution was modified, increasing the governor's term of office from two years to four years. Ray served as chair of the National Governors Association from 1975 to 1976. He also served as chairman of the Republican Governors Association, the Midwestern Governors Association, the Education Commission of the States and was the president of the Council of State Governments. He would be re-elected in 1970, 1972, 1974, 1978.

==== Executive Orders ====
As governor, Ray issued executive orders promoting civil rights, energy conservation, and paperwork reduction as well as establishing the Governor's Economy Committee, the Iowa Council for Children, the Task Force on Government Ethics, the Science Advisory Council, the Iowa Department of Transportation, and the Iowa High Technology Commission. Ray signed legislation establishing the Iowa Commission on the Status of Women in 1974. In 1982, that commission named him the first recipient of the Cristine Wilson Medal for Equality and Justice. In 1976, Ray, along with his wife Billie Ray and three daughters, became the first governor of Iowa to occupy Terrace Hill, the official governor's mansion.

==== Taxes ====
Ray reduced property taxes and increased the income tax in order to fund the public schools of Iowa. The school foundation plan, which was passed by the legislature and signed by Ray in 1971, was crafted with the intention to lessen inequities among school districts. Arthur Neu, who served as State Senator and as Ray's lieutenant governor from 1973 to 1979, noted in an interview: "School funding was one of the most important pieces of legislation we worked on. It set Iowa schools on the path to being the best in the nation. It’s a plan a lot of other states copied."

Ray also signed into law bipartisan legislation that supported collective bargaining for public employees and removed sales taxes from groceries and prescription drugs. He opposed the death penalty and supported abortion for women in cases that risked women's health, and in cases of rape and incest. He also expanded an elderly tax credit.

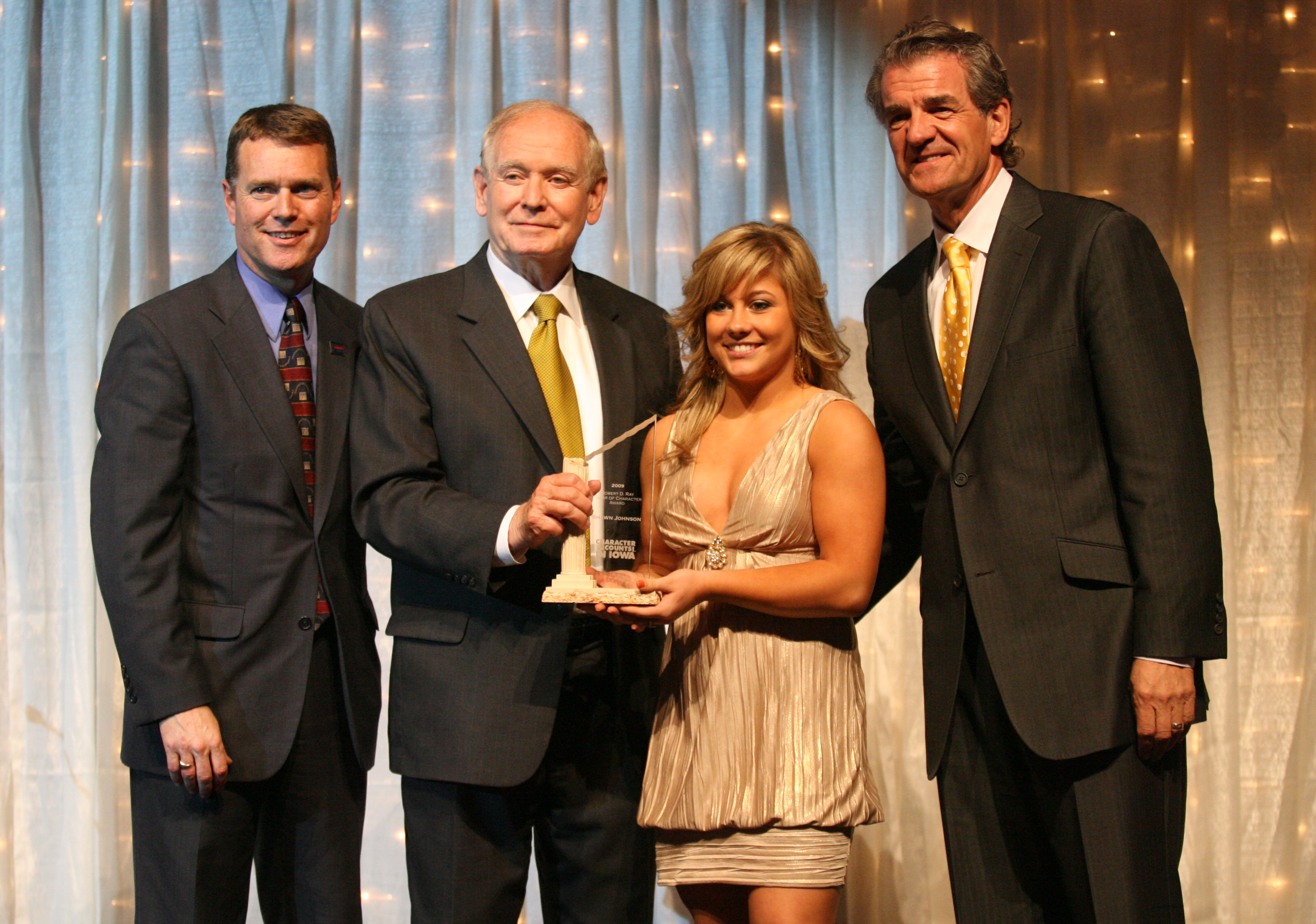
Ray (center left) presents an award to Olympic gymnast Shawn Johnson (center right) in 2009

==== Grounding Iowa National Guard ====
One of the defining moments in Ray's governorship was in April 1972, when as Commander in Chief of the Iowa National Guard, he ordered the grounding of more than a thousand vehicles and ninety planes, until the federal government paid for the damages to the McCarville and Tjernagel families, whose houses had been destroyed by crashing Air Force planes in 1968. The end result would be a pay out by the United States Air Force to the families ending a 4 year battle. Ray then ordered the Iowa National Guard's airplanes and vehicles were put back in service.

==== Can Deposit Bill ====
Ray was an advocate of the nickel deposit on aluminum cans. One of Ray's proudest achievements was signing a bottle bill into law. The bottle bill, which received opposition from labor unions and aluminium manufacturers but support from the Sierra Club, the Farm Bureau and the Boy Scouts of America, required Iowans to pay a 5-cent deposit on containers in order to encourage the practice of recycling and the reduction of litter on the roads of the state. Ray noted that "Americans are part of a throw-away society".

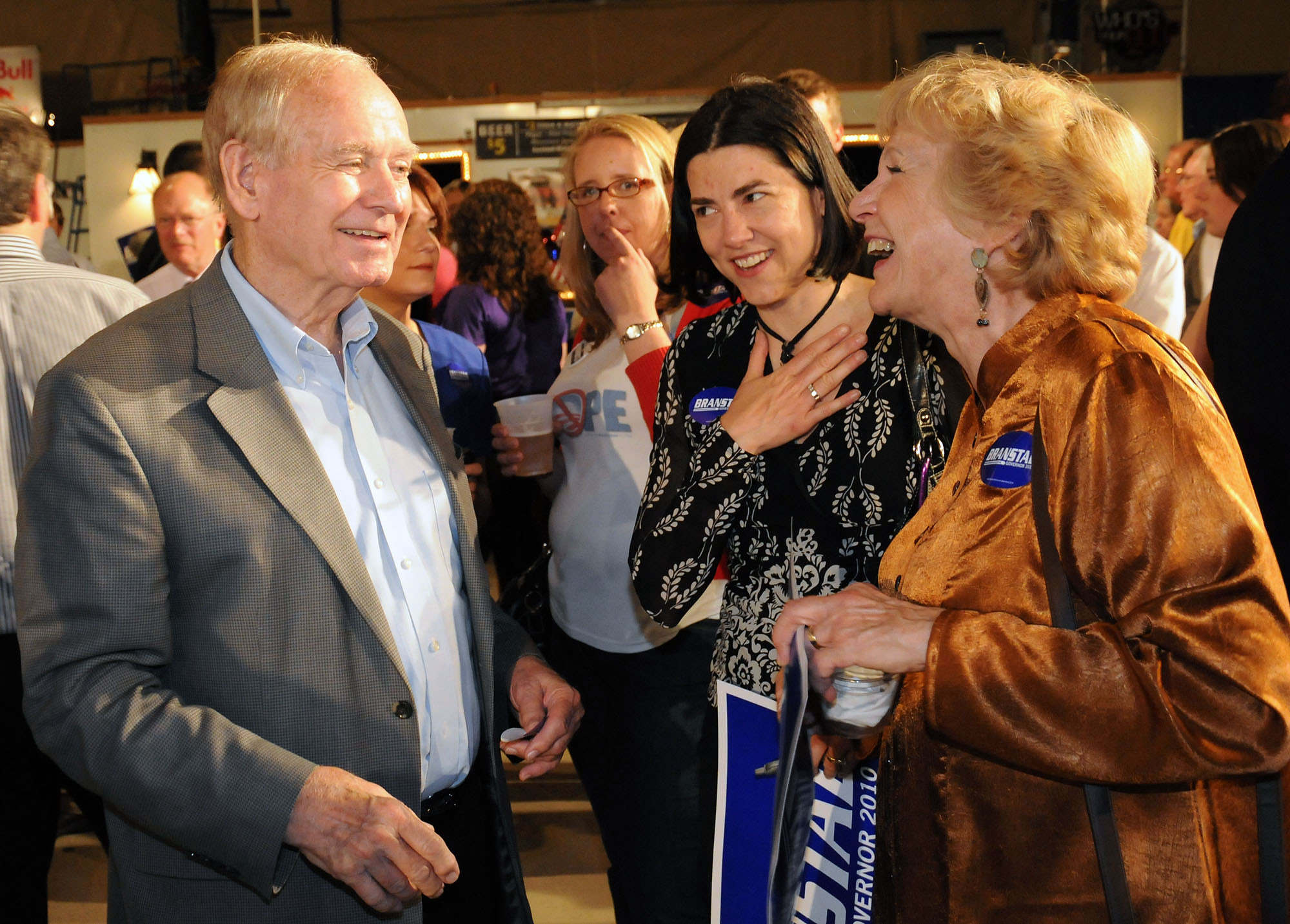
Ray (left) at the Republican primary election night party for Terry Branstad's 2010 gubernatorial campaign

==== Humanitarian Efforts ====
Ray served as a delegate to the United Nations Conference on Refugees in Geneva, Switzerland in 1979.

===== Tai Dam =====
Ray's tenure in office was notable for his humanitarianism on behalf of Southeast Asian Tai Dam refugees. Ray agreed to bring the group to the United States by creating his own refugee resettlement program. Ray announced that the state of Iowa would accept 1,500 more refugees in January 1979. Ray wrote letters to President Jimmy Carter and other governors asking them to support greater admissions of boat people. Opinion polls from the period demonstrated Ray's refugee resettlement and relief efforts were very controversial. Many feared competition for jobs, diversion of funds from needy native Iowans, and racial mixing. Ray said the following in regard to the refugees:

“I didn’t think we could just sit here idly and say, “Let these people die. We wouldn’t want the rest of the world to say that about us if we were in the same situation. Do unto others as you would have them do unto you.”

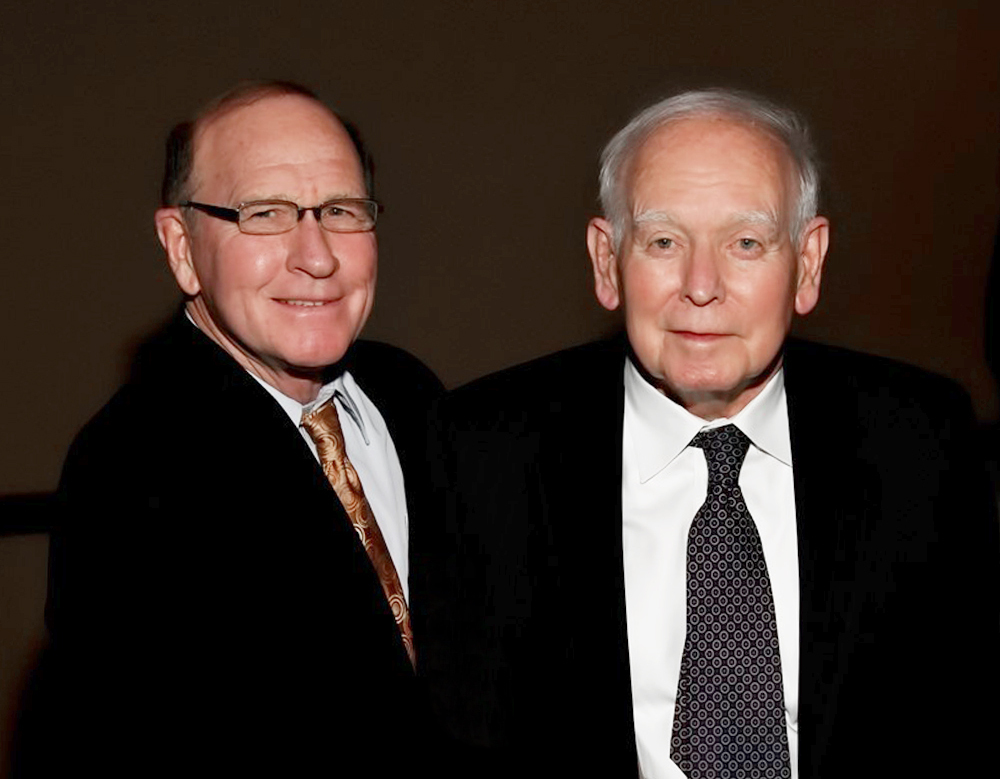
Ray (right) poses with retired Olympic wrestler Dan Gable in 2014

===== Native American Burials =====
Ray also enacted the first laws in the U.S. that protected American Indian graves. In the early 1970s, Maria Pearson was appalled that the skeletal remains of Native Americans were treated differently from those of caucasians. Pearson protested to Ray, finally gaining an audience with him after sitting outside his office in traditional attire. Ray cooperated with Pearson, and their work led to the passage of the Iowa Burials Protection Act of 1976, the first legislative act in the U.S. that specifically protected American Indian remains. This act was the state version of the federal Native American Graves Protection and Repatriation Act, that passed in 1990.

==== International Trips ====
Ray was invited, with several other governors, to tour China in 1974, then again to tour the Soviet Union in 1975. Ray also led 2 delegations to Japan, and witnessed the ceremony in 1975 to celebrate Papua New Guinea's independence from Australia.

==== Post Governorship ====
Ray was co-chair (along with Bob Edgar) of the bipartisan National Coalition on Health Care.

Ray served as interim mayor of Des Moines from May to November 1997. Ray supported Howard Baker in the 1980 Republican Party presidential primaries.

After leaving the governor's office in 1983, Ray became CEO of Life Investors Inc, an insurance company in Cedar Rapids. He then moved back to Des Moines to become CEO of Blue Cross Blue Shield. He also owned two radio stations, one named KILR in Estherville and another he co-owned WMT in Cedar Rapids.

In 1997, he helped form the Institute for Character Development at Drake University.Ray was the interim president of Drake University in 1998.

== Awards and Legacy ==
In 2005, Ray became the only governor or former governor to have received Iowa's highest civilian honor, the Iowa Award, by the Iowa Centennial Memorial Commission and presented by Governor Tom Vilsack.

The Robert D. Ray Asian Garden, in Downtown Des Moines, was named in his honor for his work saving Southeast Asian refugees. (Note: In August 2023 at the Des Moines Botanical Center, Robert Ray's grandson Jeffrey married Jasmine who is the daughter of a woman that was on the very first flight of Tai Dam refugees to Iowa.)

== Later life ==
In Ray's later years, he suffered from Parkinson's disease. On July 8, 2018, Ray died at a nursing home in Des Moines, at age 89.

== See also ==
- Vietnamese boat people

== Notes ==
Party political offices
Preceded by William G. Murray	Republican nominee Governor of Iowa; 1968, 1970, 1972, 1974, 1978	Succeeded by Terry Branstad
Preceded by Robert Bennett	Chair of the Republican Governors Association; 1977–1978	Succeeded by Otis R. Bowen
Political offices
Preceded by Robert D. Fulton	Governor of Iowa; 1969–1983	Succeeded by Terry Branstad
Preceded by Cal Rampton	Chair of the National Governors Association; 1975–1976	Succeeded by Cecil Andrus
Preceded by Arthur Davis	Mayor of Des Moines; Acting; 1997	Succeeded by Preston Daniels
Academic offices
Preceded by Michael Ferrari	President of Drake University; Acting; 1998–1999	Succeeded by David Maxwell
