= 1968 United States Senate election in Iowa =

- November 5, 1968
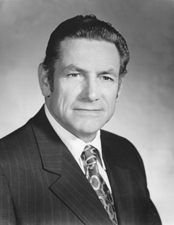

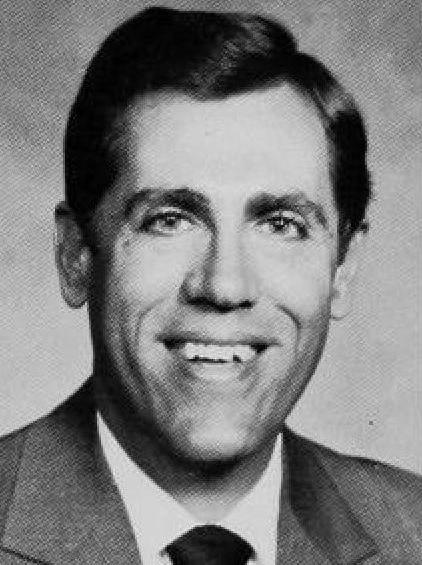
Nominee	Harold Hughes	David M. Stanley
Party	Democratic	Republican
Popular vote	574,884	568,469
Percentage	50.25%	49.69%
- County results Hughes: 50–60% 60–70% Stanley: 50–60% 60–70% 70–80%
U.S. senator before election
Bourke B. Hickenlooper
Republican
Elected U.S. Senator
Harold E. Hughes
Democratic

The 1968 United States Senate election in Iowa took place on November 5, 1968. Incumbent Republican U.S. Senator Bourke B. Hickenlooper retired. The open seat was won by Democratic Governor Harold E. Hughes, narrowly defeating Republican State Representative David M. Stanley.

== General election ==
=== Candidates ===
- Verne Higens (Prohibition)
- Harold E. Hughes, incumbent Governor of Iowa (Democratic)
- David M. Stanley, State Representative from Muscatine (Republican)

=== Results ===
1968 United States Senate election in Iowa
Party	Candidate	Votes	%	±%
Democratic	Harold E. Hughes	574,884	50.25%	▲3.64
Republican	David M. Stanley	568,469	49.69%	▼3.70
Prohibition	Verne Higens	727	0.06%	N/A
Total votes		1,143,353	100.00%	
Democratic gain from Republican		Swing		

== See also ==
- 1968 United States Senate elections
