= William J. Gannon =

American politician

Member of the Iowa House of Representatives
- In office 1965–1971

Personal details
- Born: July 9, 1937 (age 89) Mingo, Iowa, U.S.
- Party: Democratic
- Occupation: farmer

William J. Gannon (born July 9, 1937) was an American politician in the state of Iowa.

Gannon was born in Mingo, Iowa. He was a farmer. He served in the Iowa House of Representatives from 1965 to 1971 as a Democrat.

Party political offices
Preceded by Minnette Doderer	Democratic nominee for Lieutenant Governor of Iowa; 1972	Succeeded by Charles P. Miller
